= East Java =

Province in Java, Indonesia

East Java Jawa Timur
- Province
- Province of East Java; Provinsi Jawa Timur
- Coat of arms
- Nickname: Bumi Majapahit "Land of Majapahit"
- Motto: Jer Basuki Mawa Beya (Old Javanese) "Success Requires Sacrifice"
- East Java in Indonesia
- Interactive map of East Java
- Coordinates: 7.7°S 112.5°E
- Country: Indonesia
- Region: Java (Western Indonesia)
- Established: 25 February 1950
- Capital and largest city: Surabaya

Government
  - Body: East Java Provincial Government
  - Governor: Khofifah Indar Parawansa (PKB)
  - Vice Governor: Emil Dardak
  - Legislature: East Java Regional House of Representatives (DPRD)

Area
  - Total: 48,036.84 km^{2} (18,547.13 sq mi)
  - Rank: 14th in Indonesia
- Highest elevation (Mount Semeru): 3,676 m (12,060 ft)

Population (mid 2025 estimate)
  - Total: 42,089,271
  - Density: 876.1873/km^{2} (2,269.315/sq mi)

Demographics
  - Ethnic groups (2010): 80.69% Javanese; 17.53% Madurese; 0.66% Chinese; 1.12% others
  - Religion (2022): 97.26% Islam: 2.3% Christianity; 1.64% Protestantism; 0.66% Catholicism; 0.25% Hinduism; 0.17% Buddhism; 0.02% others (including Confucianism, Kejawèn, Kapitayan, etc.)
  - Languages and dialects: Indonesian (official); Javanese, Madurese, Osing, Kangean, Tenggerese, Bawean (native, regional)
- Time zone: UTC+7 (Indonesia Western Time)
- ISO 3166 code: ID-JI
- GDP (nominal): 2022
- Total: Rp 2,730.9 trillion (2nd); US$183.9 billion Int$573.9 billion (PPP)
- Per capita: Rp 66.37 million (11th); US$4,469; Int$13,946 (PPP)
- Growth: ▲5.34%
- HDI (2024): ▲0.754 (12th) – high
- Website: jatimprov.go.id

East Java (Indonesian: Jawa Timur, Javanese: ꦙꦮꦶꦮꦺꦠꦤ꧀, romanized: Jawi Wétan, Madurese: ꦗꦧꦠꦺꦩꦺꦴꦂ, romanized: Jhâbâ Tèmor) is a province of Indonesia located in the easternmost third of Java island. It has a land border only with the province of Central Java to the west; the Java Sea and the Indian Ocean border its northern and southern coasts, respectively, while the narrow Bali Strait to the east separates Java from Bali by around 2.29 kilometers (1.42 mi). Located in eastern Java, the province also includes the island of Madura (which is connected to Java by the longest bridge in Indonesia, the Suramadu Bridge), as well as the Kangean islands and other smaller island groups located further east (in the northern Bali Sea) and the Masalembu archipelago to the north. Its capital is Surabaya, the second largest city in Indonesia, a major industrial center and also a major business center. Banyuwangi is the largest regency in East Java and the largest on the island of Java.

The province covers a land area of 48,036.84 square kilometers (18,547.13 sq mi), and according to the 2010 Census, there were 37,476,757 people residing there, making it Indonesia's second-most-populous province; the 2020 Census showed an increase to 40,665,696 people, while the official estimate for mid 2025 was 42,089,271 (comprising 20,978,460 males and 21,110,830 females). Almost a quarter of the population lives inside the Greater Surabaya metropolitan area. East Java is inhabited by many different ethnic groups, such as the Javanese, Madurese and Chinese. Most of the people in East Java adhere to Islam, forming around 94% of the total population. Other religions are also practiced, such as Christianity, Buddhism and Confucianism which are mostly practiced by Tionghoa people and immigrants from Eastern Indonesia and North Sumatra, and also Hinduism which are practiced by the Tenggerese people in the Bromo Tengger Semeru National Park and the Balinese people inhabiting the easternmost part of the province bordering Bali as well as the dominant minority Indian Indonesians in Surabaya city.

The Indonesian language is the official language of the province as well as the whole nation, but Javanese and Madurese are most frequently used, especially the Surabaya dialect (Javanese: Suroboyoan or Surabayaan — the Javanese dialect of Surabaya) used mainly in the capital Surabaya. Indonesian is only used for inter-ethnic communication and official purposes.

East Java offers different types of tourist attractions. There are a variety of natural attractions, including mountains, beaches, caves, and waterfalls. Almost every regency or city in East Java has its own unique tourist destinations, such as the Ijen volcano in Banyuwangi, Baluran National Park in Situbondo, and Bromo Tengger Semeru National Park in Malang, Pasuruan, Lumajang, and Probolinggo.

== History ==
=== Prehistory ===
East Java has been inhabited by humans since prehistoric times. This was proven by the discovery of fossils remains of the Pithecanthropus mojokertensis in Kepuhlagen, Mojokerto; Pithecanthropus erectus on Trinil, Ngawi; and Homo wajakensis in Wajak, Tulungagung.

=== Hindu-Buddhist era ===
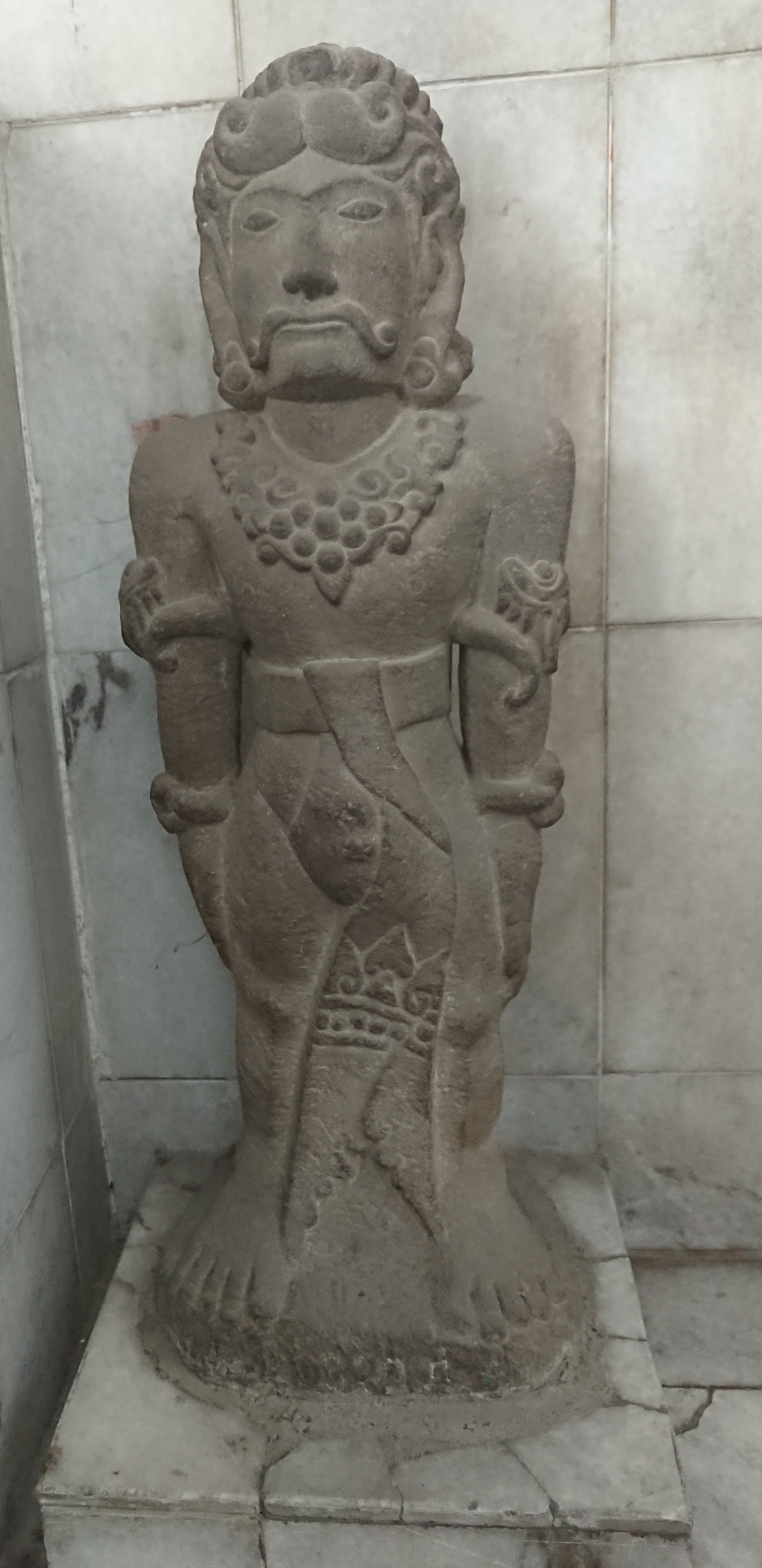
Gadjah Mada is a warlord and Mahapatih (Prime Minister) who was very influential during the Majapahit Empire.

The Dinoyo inscriptions found near the city of Malang are the oldest written sources in East Java, dating from 760 CE. It tells of many political and cultural events in the Kingdom of Kanjuruhan. The name Malang is thought to come from the name of a sacred building called Malangkuseswara. This name is contained in the Mantyasih inscription written in 907 CE.

In 1222, Ken Arok founded the Kingdom of Singhasari, which he ruled until 1227. Before coming to power, Ken Arok seized power in Tumapel (Kediri) from Tungul Ametung. Ken Arok's descendants became kings of Singhasari and Majapahit from the 13th until the 15th century.

In 1227, Anusapati killed Ken Arok, and later became king of Singhasari. Anusapati's power only lasted 20 years, before he was killed by Tohjaya. Three years later, Tohjaya was killed in an uprising led by Jaya Wisnuwardhana, son of Anusapati. In 1268, Wisnuwardhana died, and he was succeeded by Kertanegara (1268–1292). In 1292 Kertanegara was defeated by a rebel named Jayakatwang, ending the Singhasari.

In 1293, Kublai Khan, founder of the Yuan dynasty, sent a large invasion fleet to Java with 20,000 to 30,000 soldiers, beginning the Mongol invasion of Java. This was a punitive expedition against King Kertanegara of Singhasari, who had refused to pay tribute to the Yuan and maimed one of its ministers. However, it ended with failure for the Mongols.

In 1294, the Kingdom of Majapahit was founded by Raden Wijaya. The Majapahit reached its peak during the reign of Hayam Wuruk. He was accompanied by the Mahapatih Gajah Mada. Together they managed to unite the archipelago under the name Dwipantara. Majapahit developed to become one of the strongest empires in Southeast Asia.

In 1357, the Battle of Bubat occurred, starting a war between the Sunda Kingdom and the Majapahit. The event stemmed from the desire of king Hayam Wuruk to take a Sundanese princess. Dyah Pitaloka as queen. However, because of a misunderstanding about the procedure of marriage, leading to a battle in Bubat. Majapahit troops, under the command of Gajah Mada, captured and killed the present Members of the Royal Family of Pajajaran. In 1389, Hayam Wuruk died, and was succeeded by Wikramawardhana. This resulted in the beginning of the decline of the Majapahit Empire. As the Majapahit Empire went into decline in the late 1300s, Islam moved to fill the vacuum.

=== Islamic era ===
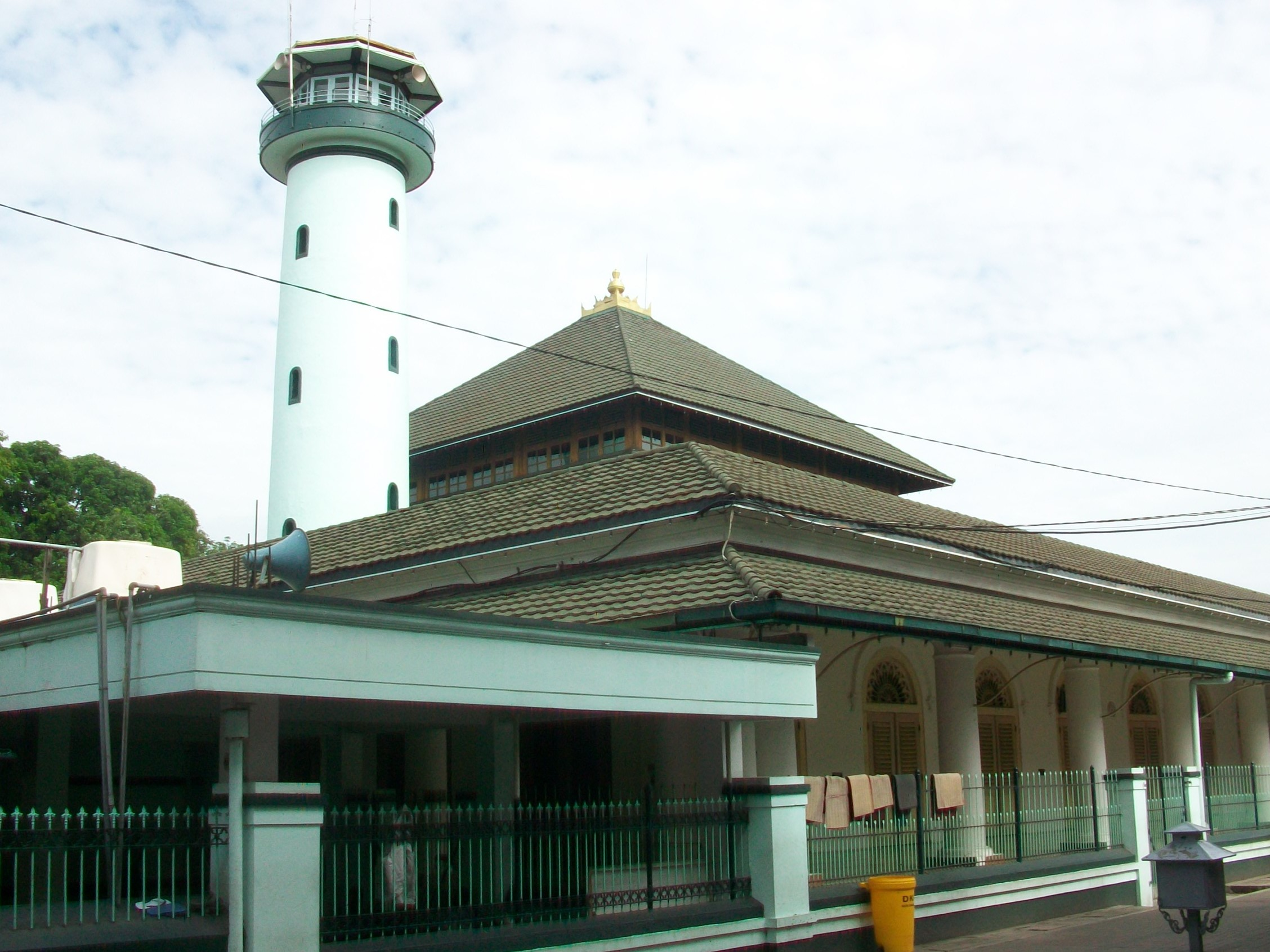
The Ampel Mosque in Surabaya, the oldest surviving mosque in Java and second oldest in Indonesia, was built in 1421

The precise date when Islam entered Java remains unclear. This is due to the absence of a definite source regarding the arrival of Islam in Java. However, according to some experts, it is estimated that Islam entered Java around the 11th century, with the tomb of Fatimah Binti Maimun in the village of Leran in Gresik Regency which dates from 475 AH (1085 AD). The tomb also shows that by the 11th century, the North coast of Java had been frequented by Arab traders from the Middle East. In addition, several Islamic tombs were discovered in Trowulan, located in what is now part of the Mojokerto Regency, near the site of the former Majapahit palace.

In the 15th century, a Chinese Hui voyager named Ma Huan visited East Java. He then wrote the book Yingya Shenglan, which tells the story of the countries he visited over the course of the Ming treasure voyages. He mentioned that at that time, there were three different peoples inhabiting Eastern Java: Arabs from the Middle East, the ancestor of the modern Arab Indonesians; Chinese Muslims originating from modern-day Guangdong province, and the native Javanese people.

By the 16th century, the Majapahit Empire was defeated by Islamic kingdoms in Java, resulting in the exile of many Majapahit aristocrats to the neighboring island of Bali. Those who remained in Java were forced to convert to Islam, while a small pocket of isolated people living in the Bromo Tengger Semeru National Park spread around Pasuruan, Probolinggo, Malang, and Lumajang Regencies remains adhered to Hinduism to this day. They are known as the Tenggerese people. Their population of roughly 100,000 is centered in 30 villages in the isolated Tengger mountains.

When Islamic sultanates started ruling Java, cities in the northern coast started developing, becoming thriving ports. One of them was the town of Tuban, which was a wealthy and important port with many Chinese settlers. Being a port of the Majapahit and the point of departure for the Moluccas, it exported an abundant supply of foodstuffs and imported a rich variety of products from the Moluccas. At the end of the 16th century, Islam had surpassed Hinduism and Buddhism as the dominant religion in Java. At first, the spread of Islam was very rapid and was accepted by ordinary people, until the da'wah entered and it was carried out by the rulers of the island.

=== European colonization ===
The relationship between the Javanese and European colonial powers began in 1522, with the signing of a treaty between the Sunda Kingdom and the Portuguese Empire in Malacca. After the failure of the treaty, the Portuguese presence was then limited to Malacca in the Malay Peninsula and the Maluku Islands. An expedition under the leadership of the Dutch explorer Cornelis de Houtman consisting of four ships in 1596 became the beginning of Dutch presence in the island. At the end of the 18th century, the Dutch had succeeded in expanding their influence on the Islamic sultanates in the interior of the island of Java.

At the onset of the Napoleonic Wars, the British conquered Java in 1811. Java briefly became part of the British Empire, with Sir Stamford Raffles as its Governor-General. In 1814, Britain returned Java to the Netherlands as stipulated in the Anglo-Dutch Treaty of 1814.

=== Japanese occupation and revolution ===
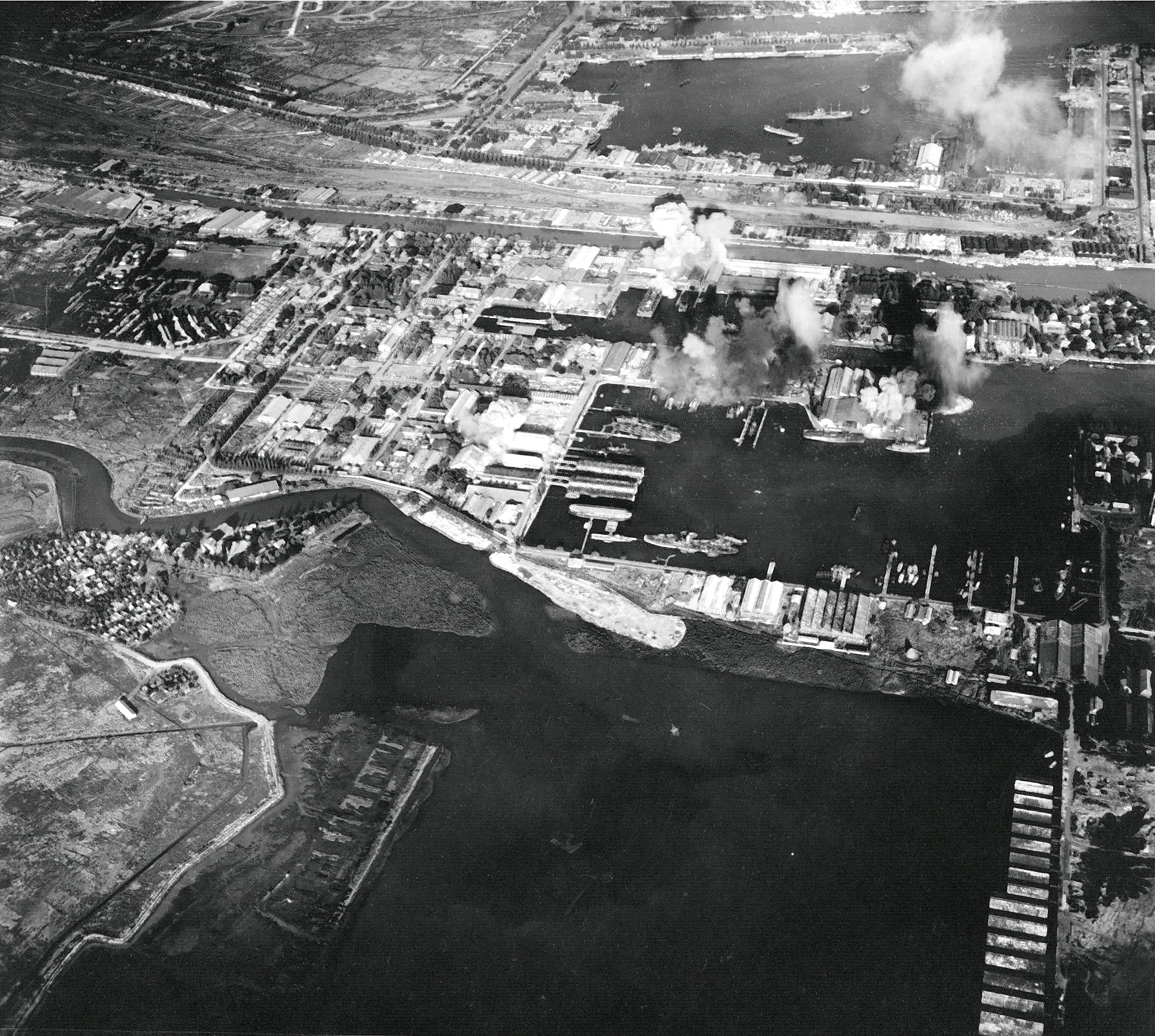
Operation Transom, destroyed Tanjung Perak in 1944

During the Japanese occupation of the Dutch East Indies, there was persistent resistance against the Japanese rule. In Blitar, an uprising by Pembela Tanah Air (PETA) led by Supriyadi, Moeradi, Halir Mangkudijoyo, and Soemarto occurred in early 1945, but it was crushed by the Japanese.

Two weeks after the proclamation of independence, Surabaya established its own government under, Raden Sudirman. The formation of government in Surabaya caused disputes between the republican forces and Japanese troops, resulting in various skirmishes across the city. This was because when the Japanese surrendered, they were obliged to remain in power until the allied forces arrived. The arrival of allied forces in Surabaya created tensions with the newly established government of Indonesia, reaching peak on 10 November 1945 where a major battle between the Surabayan residents led by Sutomo and allied forces.

The battle forced the governor, Suryo, on the advice of People's Security Army (TKR), to move the seat of the government to Mojokerto. A week later, the government retreated again to a more secure location in Kediri. However, security situation Kediri worsen until finally, in February 1947, the East Java provincial government fled to Malang. While the administration was based in Malang, Governor Soerjo was replaced by R.P. Suroso, who was in turn replaced again by Dr. Moerdjani. On 21 July 1947, although still bound by the Linggadjati Agreement, a ceasefire agreement in effect since 14 October 1946, the Dutch commenced a military action, Operation Product, which led to deteriorating security conditions in Malang. The East Java provincial government moved again to Blitar.

This military action ended after the Renville Agreement. However, this agreement reduced the territory controlled by the East Java provincial government. The Netherlands then turned the areas under its control into new federal states, the State of Madura and the State of East Java. Amid the difficulties faced by the government of Indonesia, a left-wing opposition group, Front Demokrasi Rakyat (FDR, People's Democratic Front) launched rebellion in Madiun on 18 September 1948. However, eventually this revolt was defeated by the Indonesian Army. On 19 December 1948, the Dutch launched Operation Kraai. Blitar, the seat of the East Java provincial government was attacked by the Dutch. Governor Moerdjani and his staff were forced to flee and joined the guerrillas on the slopes of Mount Wilis. Operation Kraai ended after the Roem–Van Roijen Agreement on 7 May 1949.

Following the Dutch–Indonesian Round Table Conference, at which the Netherlands agreed to transfer sovereignty to the United States of Indonesia, the Dutch withdrew its troops from East Java. East Java changed its status from a province into a state. However, on 25 February 1950, this was dissolved and became part of the territory of the Republic of Indonesia. The State of Madura also decided to join Indonesia.

=== Contemporary era ===
Along with rapid growth of urbanization in East Java, the governments could not satisfy the population's needs for affordable housing, which led to the building of shanty towns along the rivers and rail tracks. Today, the shanty towns still exist; although some have been transformed into "better" housing.

East Java has twice hosted the Indonesian National Games (Indonesian: Pekan Olahraga Nasional) (PON), the 7th (1969) and 15th PONs (2000), and became the overall champions in 2000 and 2008.

== Geography ==
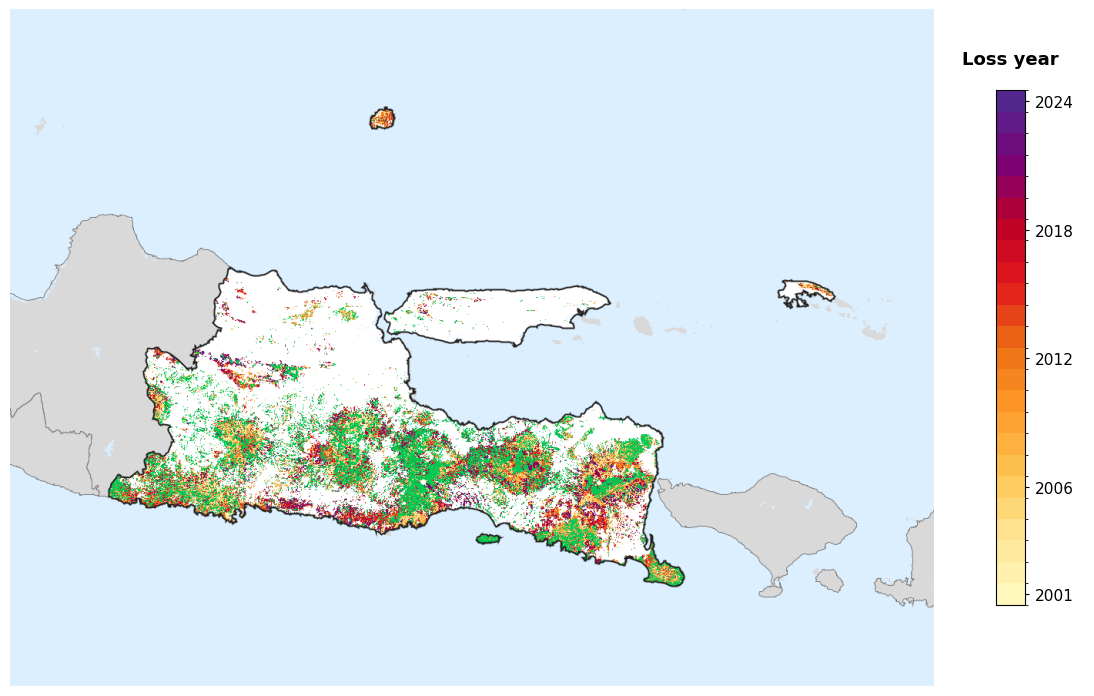
Tree-cover loss year in East Java, 2001-2024, from the Global Forest Change dataset.

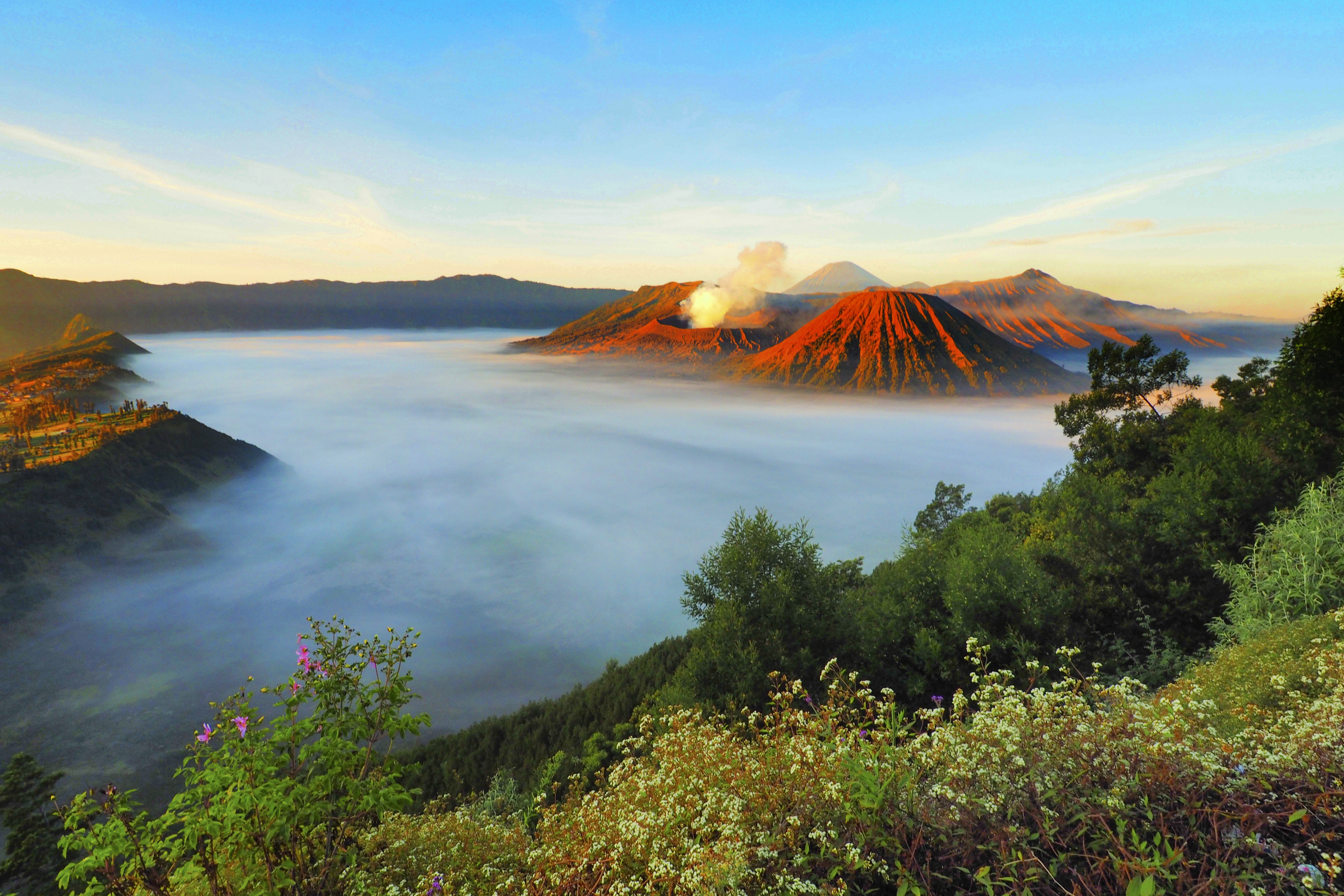
Eastern Salient of Java mountain range view from Bromo Tengger Semeru National Park at early morning

East Java province borders the Java Sea in the north, the Strait of Bali in the east, and the Indian Ocean in the south, as well as the Central Java province in the west. The length of the east–west stretch of about 400 km. The width of the stretch of the north–south in the west about 200 km, but in the eastern part of narrower by about 60 km. Madura is the largest island in East Java, separated from the mainland Java by the Strait of Madura. Bawean Island is located about 150 km north of Java. In the east of Madura there are clusters of islands, the easternmost are the Kangean Islands and the northernmost are the Masalembu Islands. Off the south coast of Java there are two small islands namely Nusa Barong and Sempu Island.

=== Geology ===
In physiographic of geology, East Java Province can be grouped into three zones: the southern zone (plato), the middle zone (volcanic), and the northern zone (folds). Lowlands and highlands in the middle (of Ngawi, Blitar, Malang, to Bondowoso) has a fairly fertile soil. In the northern part ( Bojonegoro, Tuban, Gresik, to Madura Island) lies the Kapur Utara mountains and the Kendeng mountains which are relatively barren.

In the middle of the province stretch mountain ranges and volcanoes: On the border with Central Java is Mount Lawu (3,265 meters). Southeast from Madiun is Mount Wilis (2,169 meters), and Mount Liman (2,563 meters). In the middle of the corridor lies the Anjasmoro mountains with peaks Mount Arjuno (3,339 meters), Mount Welirang (3,156 meters), Mount Anjasmoro (2,277 meters), Mount Kawi (2,551 meters), and Mount Kelud (1,731 meters); The mountains are located in most Kediri, Blitar, Malang, Pasuruan, Mojokerto and Jombang. The group has the peak of Mount Bromo Tengger (2,329 meters), and Mount Semeru (3,676 meters). Mount Semeru, which is also called Mahameru is the highest mountain in the island of Java. In the easternmost part if the province, there are two groups of mountains: the Iyang mountains with the peak Mount Argopuro (3,088 meters), the Ijen mountains with the peak Mount Raung (3344 meters) In the south there is a series of hills, that of the south coast of Pacitan, Trenggalek, Tulungagung, Blitar, Malang. the Kapur Selatan mountains is a continuation of a series of the Sewu mountains in Yogyakarta.

=== Water ===
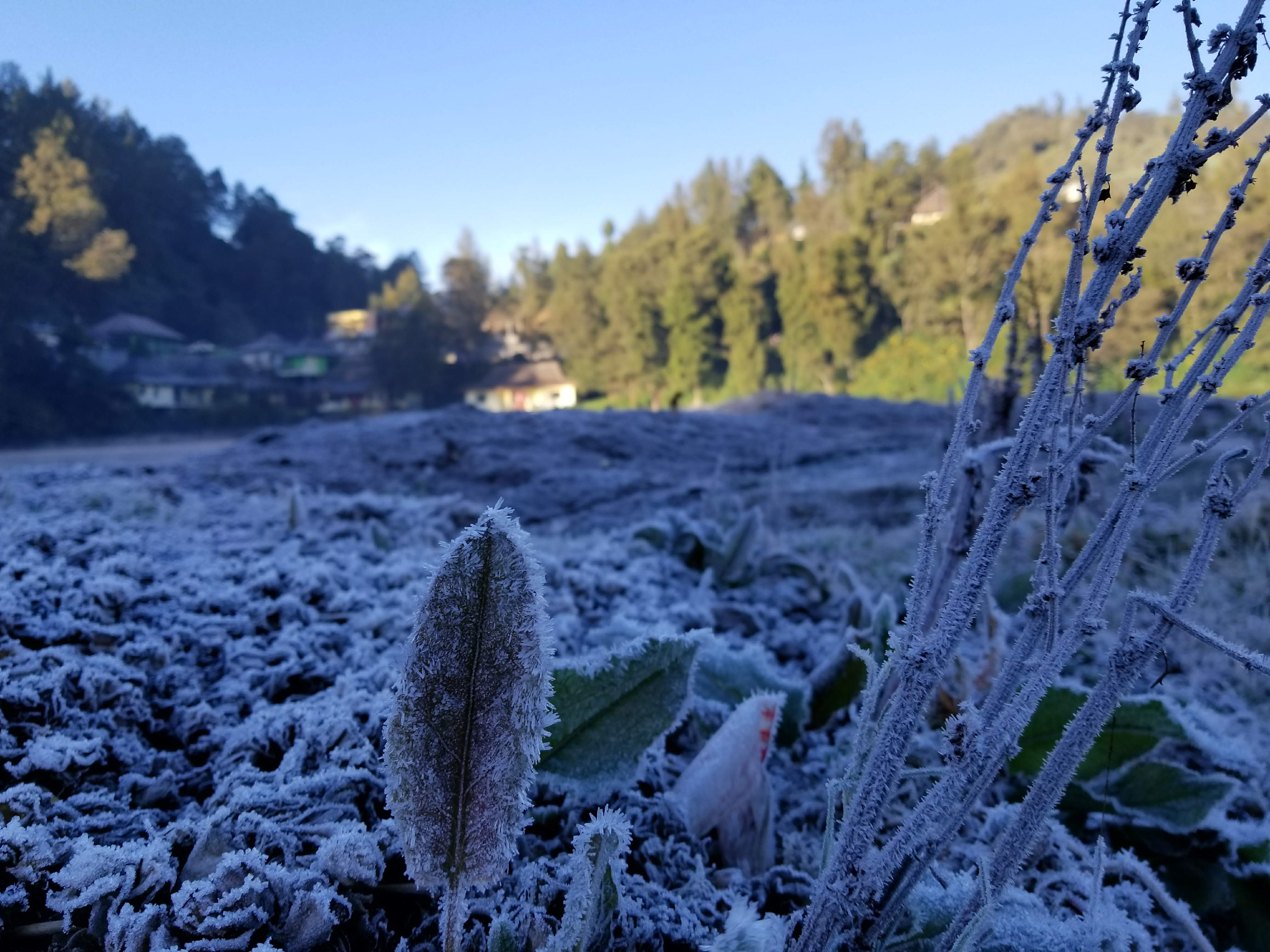
Light snow and frost are common at East Java highlands over 2,000 meters above sea level in middle of year during late night until morning

Two of the most important rivers in East Java are the Brantas River (290 kilometers), and the Solo River (548 kilometers). The Brantas River has headwaters on the slopes Mount Arjuno near Batu, and flows through most areas in East Java, like Malang, Blitar, Tulungagung, Kediri, Jombang and Mojokerto. In Mojokerto, the Brantas River split into two: Kali Mas, and Porong; both empty into the Madura Strait. The Solo River has headwaters on the slopes of Mount Lawu which lies on the border between East Java and Central Java, and flows through a portion of the eastern part of Central Java and East Java, which eventually empties into the sea at Gresik. The Brantas River and Bengawan Solo are managed by Perum Jasa Tirta I. On the slopes of Mount Lawu near the border with Central Java are Sarangan, a natural lake. The main dam in East Java, among others Ir. Sutami and Selorejo Dam, which is used for irrigation, fish farming and tourism.

=== Climate ===
East Java has a tropical monsoon and savanna climate at lower elevation and subtropical at higher elevation. Compared with the western part of Java Island, East Java in general has less rainfall. Average rainfall is 1,900 mm per year, with a rainy season during the 100 days. The average temperature ranges between 19–34 °C. Temperatures in the lower mountain areas, and even in areas Ranu Pani (slopes of Mount Semeru), temperatures can reach –4 °C, causing a frost and fall of light snow.

== Government and administrative divisions ==
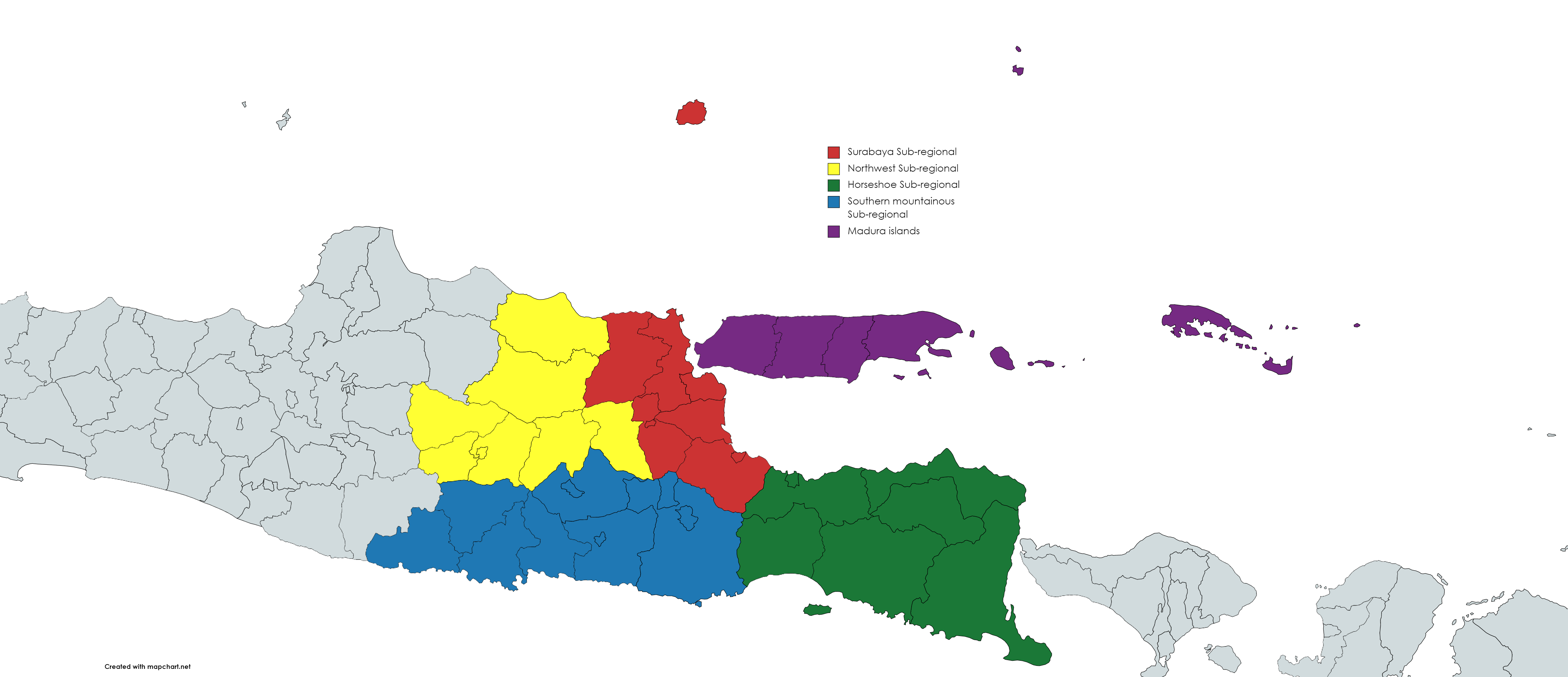
Sub-region of East Java

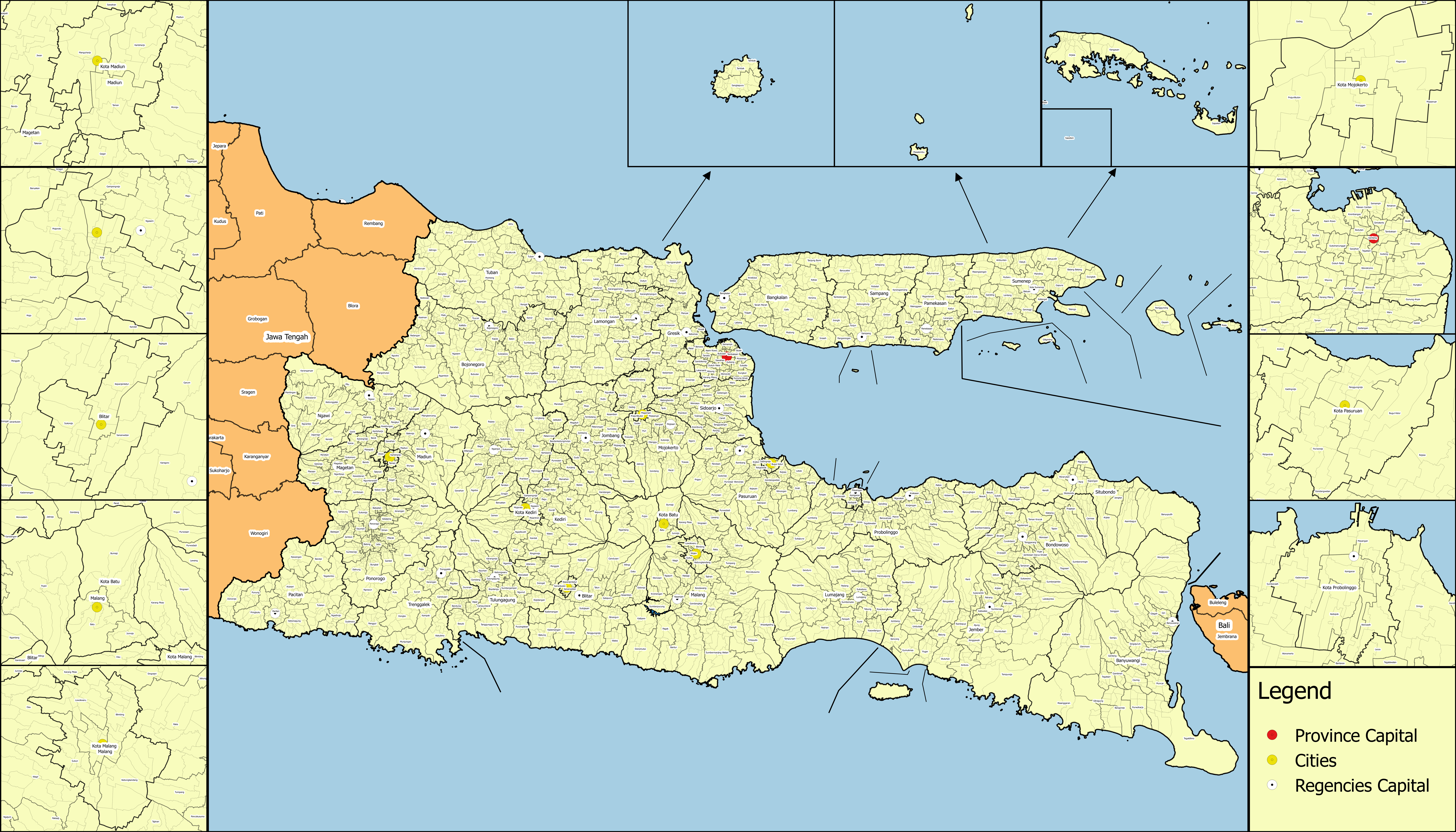
2nd-level Administrative map of East Java Province

East Java is divided into 29 kabupaten (or regencies), and 9 kotamadya (or cities). This division has remained unchanged since the creation of the province, except for the creation of the new city of Batu on 21 June 2001 (by separation from Malang Regency). These regencies and cities with their areas and populations at the 2000, 2010 and 2020 Censuses, together with the official estimates as at mid 2025, are listed below, grouped geographically into five (unofficial) sub-regions entirely for convenience of access. The sub-regions have no official status. These regencies and cities are divided as at 2023 into 666 districts (kecamatan) which are in turn composed of 8,494 administrative villages (rural desa and urban kelurahan):

Region Code	Name of City or Regency	Seat	Area (km^{2})	Pop'n 2000 Census	Pop'n 2010 Census	Pop'n 2020 Census	Pop'n mid 2025 Estimate
35.01	Pacitan Regency	Pacitan	1,433.59	525,758	540,881	586,110	589,034
35.02	Ponorogo Regency	Ponorogo	1,418.62	841,449	855,281	949,318	966,111
35.03	Trenggalek Regency	Trenggalek	1,249.23	649,883	674,411	731,125	747,614
35.04	Tulungagung Regency	Tulungagung	1,144.53	929,833	990,158	1,089,775	1,119,588
35.05	Blitar Regency	Kanigoro	1,745.16	1,064,643	1,116,639	1,223,745	1,273,451
35.06	Kediri Regency	Ngasem	1,523.56	1,408,353	1,499,768	1,635,294	1,702,262
35.07	Malang Regency	Kepanjen	3,473.44	2,412,570	2,446,218	2,654,448	2,755,438
35.71	Kediri City		67.23	244,519	268,507	286,796	301,202
35.72	Blitar City		33.20	119,372	131,968	149,149	156,330
35.73	Malang City		111.08	756,982	820,243	843,810	879,873
35.79	Batu City		194.17	^{(a)}	190,184	213,046	225,120
Southern region totals			12,393.81	8,953,362	9,534,258	10,362,616	10,716,023
35.08	Lumajang Regency	Lumajang	1,797.10	965,192	1,006,458	1,119,251	1,152,264
35.09	Jember Regency	Jember	3,313.46	2,187,657	2,332,726	2,536,729	2,620,135
35.10	Banyuwangi Regency	Banyuwangi	3,592.90	1,488,791	1,556,078	1,708,114	1,764,540
35.11	Bondowoso Regency	Bondowoso	1,554.99	688,651	736,772	776,151	796,300
35.12	Situbondo Regency	Situbondo	1,653.72	603,705	647,619	685,967	704,243
35.13	Probolinggo Regency	Kraksaan	1,724.51	1,004,967	1,096,244	1,152,537	1,193,272
35.74	Probolinggo City		54.68	191,522	217,062	239,649	252,085
Tapal Kuda ("horseshoe")/Eastern region totals			13,691.36	7,130,485	7,592,959	8,218,398	8,482,839
35.14	Pasuruan Regency	Bangil	1,493.29	1,366,605	1,512,468	1,605,969	1,669,400
35.15	Sidoarjo Regency	Sidoarjo	724.04	1,563,015	1,941,497	2,082,801	2,193,692
35.16	Mojokerto Regency	Mojosari	984.64	908,004	1,025,443	1,119,209	1,162,696
35.24	Lamongan Regency	Lamongan	1,752.71	1,181,660	1,179,059	1,344,165	1,386,390
35.25	Gresik Regency (includes Bawean Island)	Gresik	1,256.36	1,005,445	1,177,042	1,311,215	1,377,287
35.75	Pasuruan City		39.00	168,323	186,262	208,006	222,334
35.76	Mojokerto City		20.22	108,938	120,196	132,434	138,613
35.78	Surabaya City		350.6	2,599,796	2,765,487	2,874,314	2,931,611
Surabaya region totals			6,606.19	8,901,786	9,907,454	10,678,224	11,082,023
35.17	Jombang Regency	Jombang	1,109.84	1,126,930	1,202,407	1,318,062	1,373,793
35.18	Nganjuk Regency	Nganjuk	1,289.07	973,472	1,017,030	1,103,902	1,138,604
35.19	Madiun Regency	Caruban	1,113.63	639,825	662,278	744,350	760,948
35.20	Magetan Regency	Magetan	706.44	615,254	620,442	670,812	689,209
35.21	Ngawi Regency	Ngawi	1,395.80	813,228	817,765	870,057	887,172
35.22	Bojonegoro Regency	Bojonegoro	2,312.63	1,165,401	1,209,973	1,301,635	1,330,516
35.23	Tuban Regency	Tuban	1,973.50	1,051,999	1,118,464	1,198,012	1,231,374
35.77	Madiun City		36.13	163,956	170,964	195,175	203,552
Northwest region totals			9,937.04	6,550,065	6,819,323	7,402,005	7,615,168
East Java (excluding Madura) totals			42,628.39	31,535,693	33,853,994	36,661,132	37,896,053
35.26	Bangkalan Regency	Bangkalan	1,301.03	805,048	906,761	1,060,377	1,112,956
35.27	Sampang Regency	Sampang	1,228.25	750,046	877,772	969,694	1,027,538
35.28	Pamekasan Regency	Pamekasan	795.15	689,225	795,918	850,057	893,327
35.29	Sumenep Regency	Sumenep	2,084.02	985,981	1,042,312	1,124,436	1,159,397
Madura region totals			5,408.45	3,230,300	3,622,763	4,004,564	4,193,218
Total for all regions			48,036.84	34,765,993	37,476,757	40,665,696	42,089,271

Note: (a) the 2000 population of Batu City is included in the total for Malang Regency, from which it was separated on 21 June 2001.

The province comprises eleven of Indonesia's 84 national electoral districts to elect members to the People's Representative Council. The province's 87 elected members are comprised as follows:

- The East Java I Electoral District consists of the regency of Sidoarjo and the city of Surabaya, and elects 10 members to the People's Representative Council.
- The East Java II Electoral District consists of the regencies of Probolinggo and Pasuruan, together with the cities of Probolinggo and Pasuruan, and elects 7 members to the People's Representative Council.
- The East Java III Electoral District consists of the regencies of Banyuwangi, Bondowoso and Situbondo, and elects 7 members to the People's Representative Council.
- The East Java IV Electoral District consists of the regencies of Lumajang and Jember, and elects 8 members to the People's Representative Council.
- The East Java V Electoral District consists of the regency of Malang, together with the cities of Batu and Malang, and elects 8 members to the People's Representative Council.
- The East Java VI Electoral District consists of the regencies of Blitar, Kediri and Tulungagung, together with the cities of Blitar and Kediri, and elects 9 members to the People's Representative Council.
- The East Java VII Electoral District consists of the regencies of Pacitan, Ponorogo, Trenggalek, Magetan and Ngawi, and elects 8 members to the People's Representative Council.
- The East Java VIII Electoral District consists of the regencies of Mojokerto, Jombang, Nganjuk and Madiun, together with the cities of Madiun and Mojokerto, and elects 10 members to the People's Representative Council.
- The East Java IX Electoral District consists of the regencies of Bojonegoro and Tuban, and elects 6 members to the People's Representative Council.
- The East Java X Electoral District consists of the regencies of Gresik and Lamongan, and elects 6 members to the People's Representative Council.
- The East Java XI Electoral District consists of the regencies of Bangkalan, Pamekasan, Sampang and Sumenep (all on Madura Island), and elects 8 members to the People's Representative Council.

== Demographics ==
Historical population
Year	Pop.	±%
1971	25,516,999	—
1980	29,188,852	+14.4%
1990	32,503,991	+11.4%
1995	33,844,002	+4.1%
2000	34,783,640	+2.8%
2010	37,476,757	+7.7%
2015	38,828,061	+3.6%
2020	40,665,696	+4.7%
2024	41,814,499	+2.8%
Source: Badan Pusat Statistik 2011, 2021 and 2025.

According to the 2000 census, East Java had 34,765,993 people, which increased to 37,476,757 people at the 2010 Census, and to 40,665,595 at the 2020 Census, making it the second most populous Indonesian province after West Java. The official estimate as at mid 2024 was 41,814,499.

Akin to Central Java, the region's birth rates are not necessarily any lower than the rest of Java, however due to net population outflows, especially in times of calamity, not limited to volcanic eruptions or droughts, the region has varying rates of population growth that are generally lower than national average. Ethnic Javanese dominate the Java mainland as well as the total population of the province overall, while ethnic Madurese (include Bawean) inhabit Madura and the Kangean and Masalembu archipelagos, though centuries of migrations have led the Java mainland to have a larger proportion of Madurese people than Madura itself. Minorities include distinct Javanese ethnicities such as the Tengger people in the Mount Bromo region, the Samin in Bojonegoro near the Central Java border, and the Osing people in Banyuwangi. East Java also hosts a significant population of foreign ethnic groups, such as Chinese, Indians, and Arabs.

=== Ethnic and linguistic composition ===
Ethnic Groups in East Java
1. Javanese (80.7%)
2. Madurese (17.5%)
3. Chinese (0.66%)
4. Others (1.12%)

Besides the national language (Indonesian), the people of East Java predominantly use the Javanese in daily life. Javanese as spoken in the western part of East Java (Kulonan) is a similar dialect to the one spoken in Central Java, with its hierarchy of high, medium, and low registers. In the eastern part, such as Surabaya, Malang, and others, a more egalitarian version of Javanese is spoken, with less regard of hierarchy and a richer vocabulary for vulgarity. The dialect is notable for its roughness compared to other dialects spoken elsewhere in Java (especially the Mataraman dialect spoken around Surakarta and Yogyakarta, which is renowned for its smoothness) and contributes to the stereotype among Javanese people of East Javanese being "blunt" and "loud". Variants of Javanese are also used by Osing and Tengger minorities, the former utilizing a Balinese-influenced Javanese by virtue of its closeness with Bali island, and the latter speaking an archaic form of the language that retains many features now lost in other more-innovative Javanese dialects. Other than Javanese, minority language includes Madurese, spoken by around 4 million ethnic Madurese people inhabiting the Madura Islands, as well as the eastern salient of Java area; though they live practically next door with the Javanese, the language is actually closer genetically to Balinese and Sundanese.

=== Religion ===
A long time ago, Hinduism and Buddhism dominated the island until Islam gradually supplanted Hinduism in the 14th and 15th century. The last nobles and people of the fallen Majapahit fled to Bali. Islam spread from northern cities in Java where many Muslim traders from Gujarat, India stopped by. The eastern part of East Java, from Surabaya to Pasuruan, and the cities along the coast, and back to Banyuwangi to Jember, are known as the eastern salient, or "Kawasan Tapal Kuda" (the Horseshoe Region).

A remnant of Hindu tradition and syncretic abangan exists because of Islamic and Hinduism acculturation in Java.

Islamic Al-Akbar Mosque, Surabaya

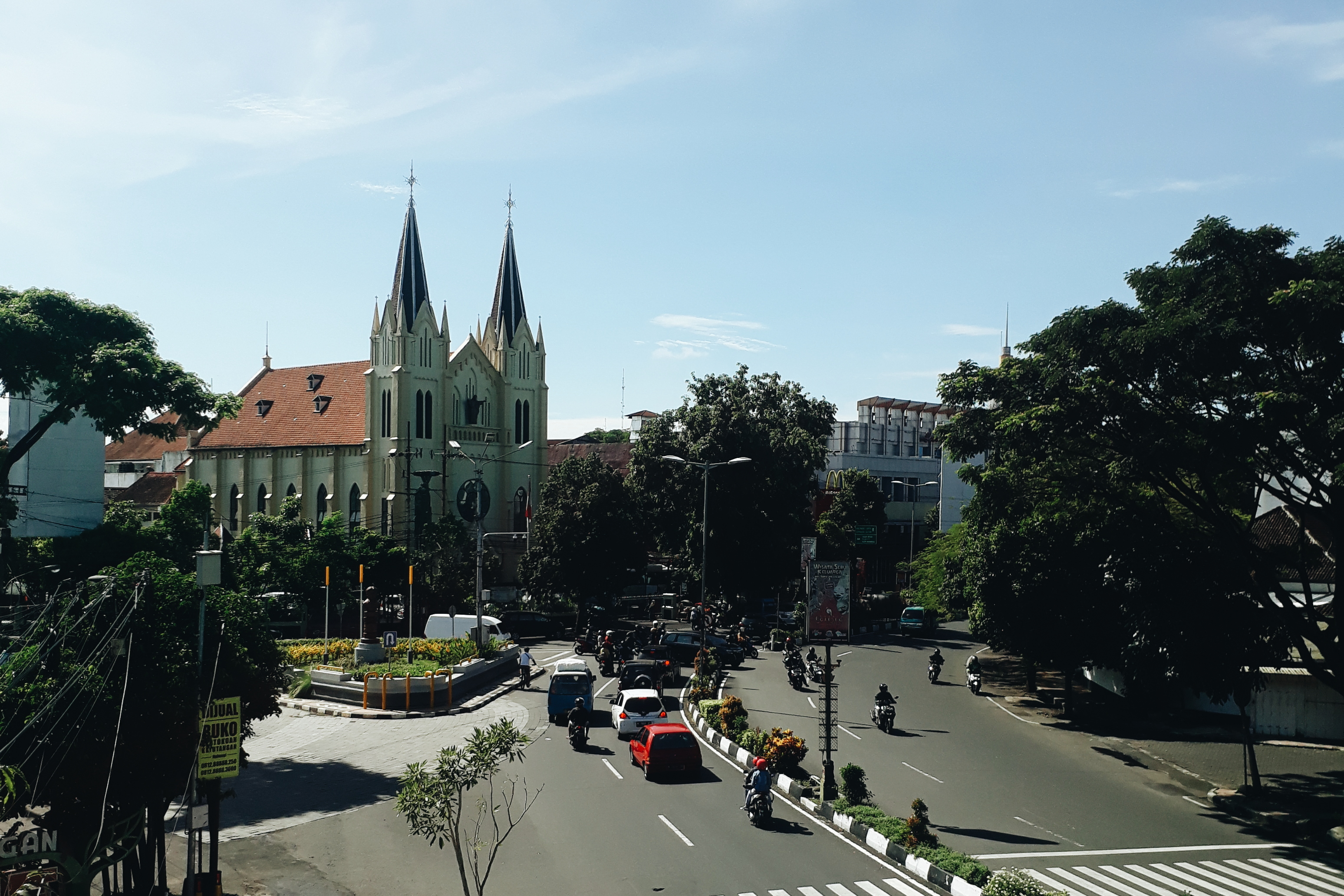
Kayutangan Catholic Church, Downtown Malang

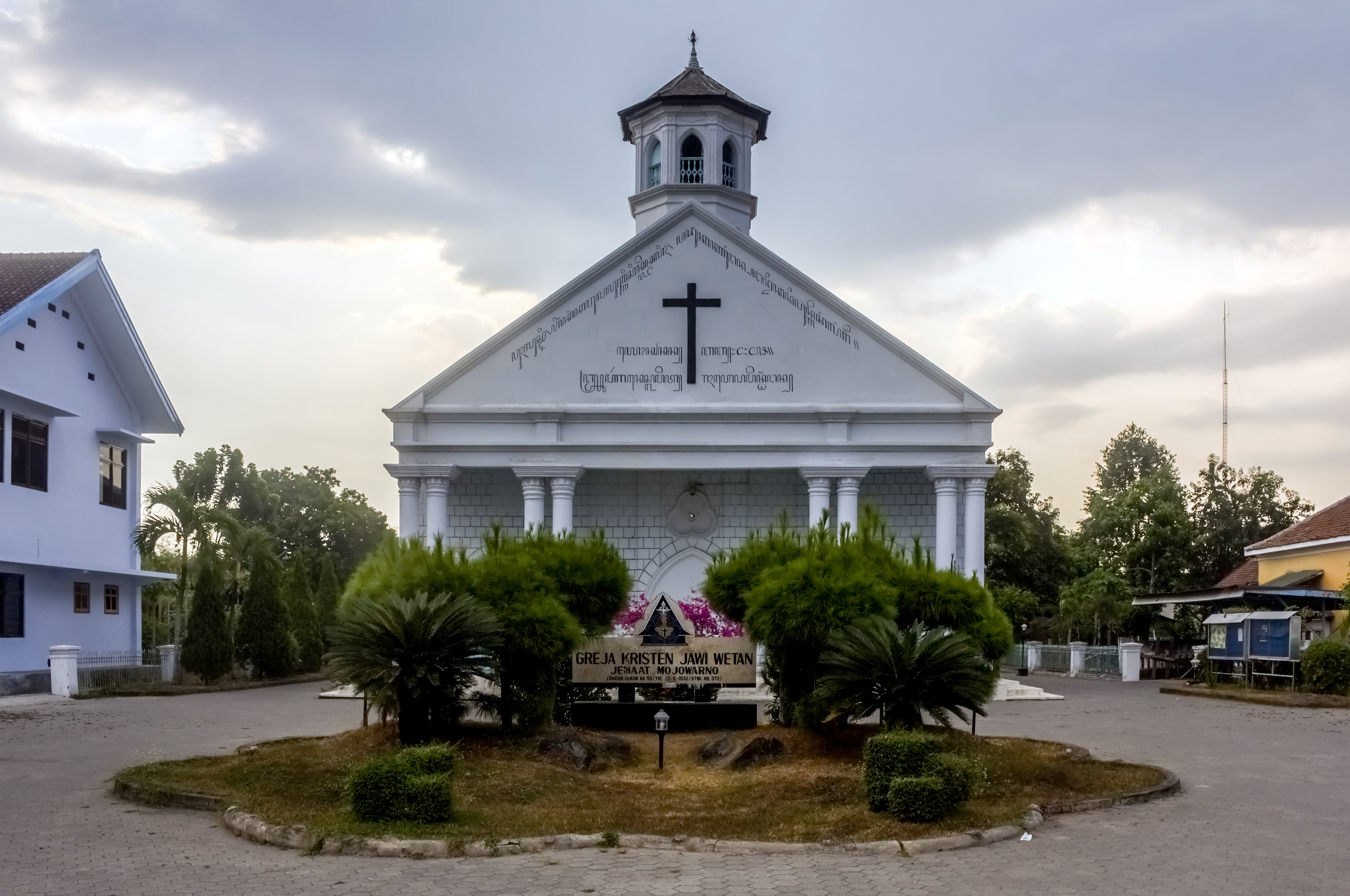
Traditional East Java Christian Church, Mojowarno, Jombang

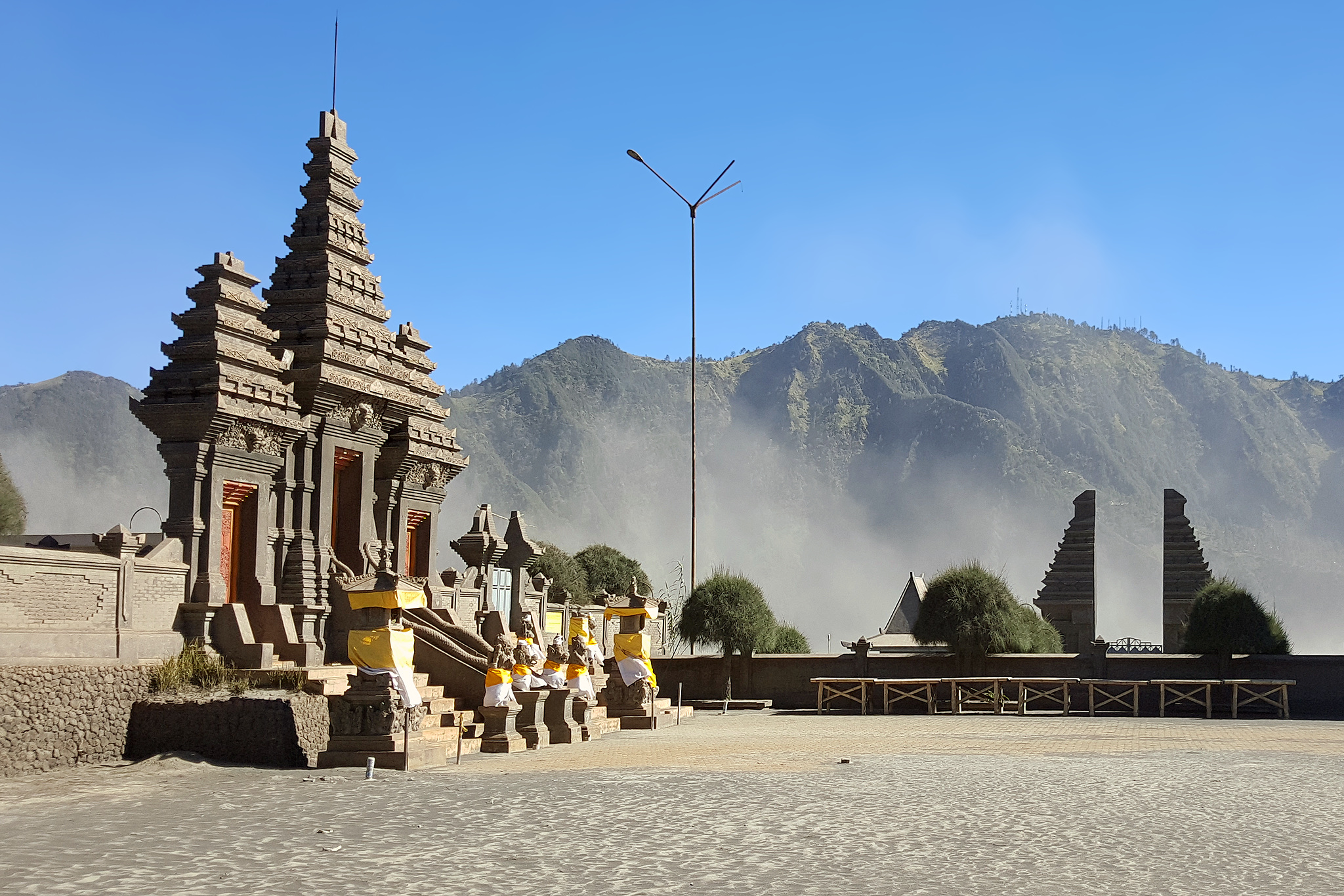
Tengger (Hindu temple) Pura Luhur Poten, near Bromo Crater

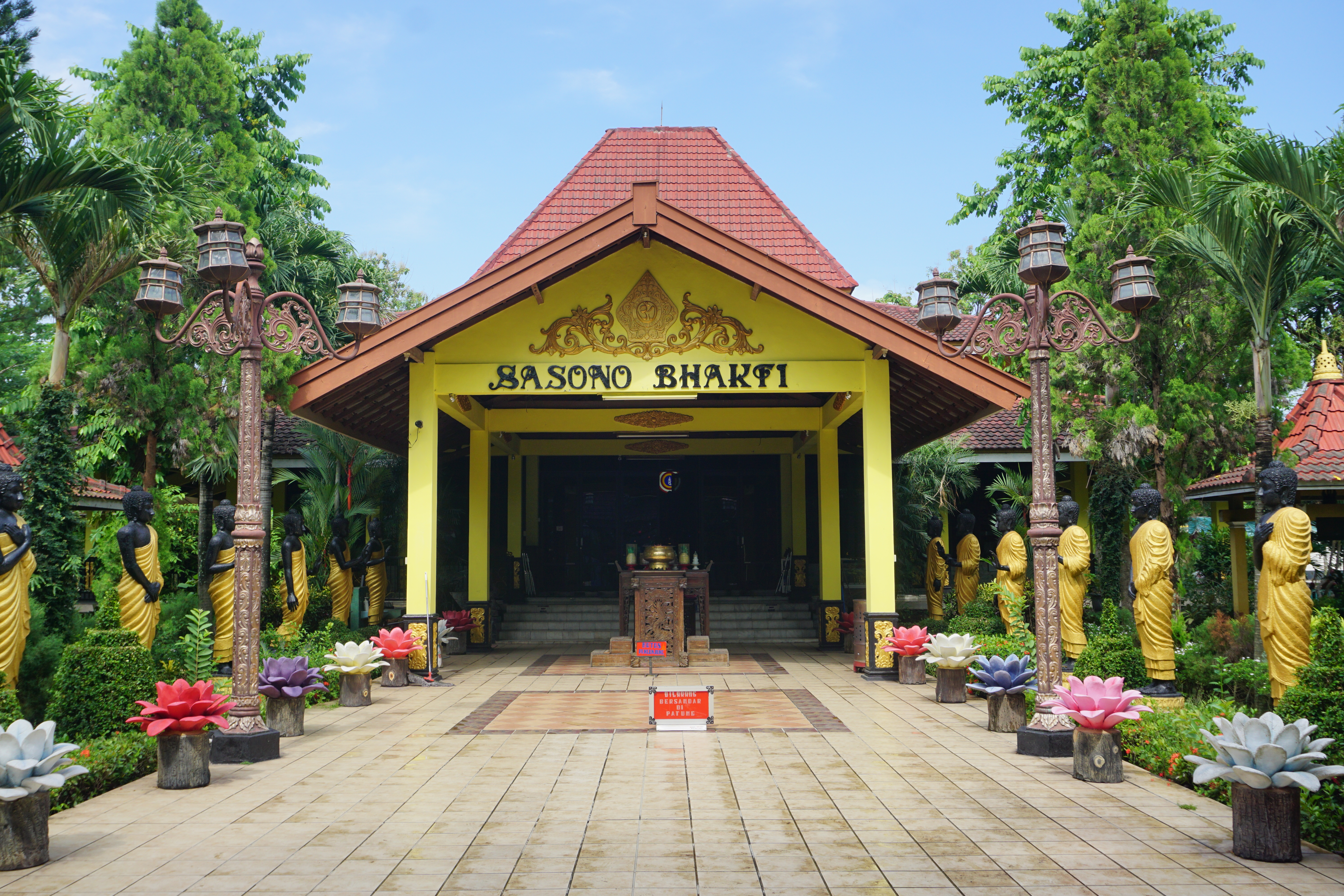
Buddhist Maha Vihara Mojopahit, Trowulan, Mojokerto

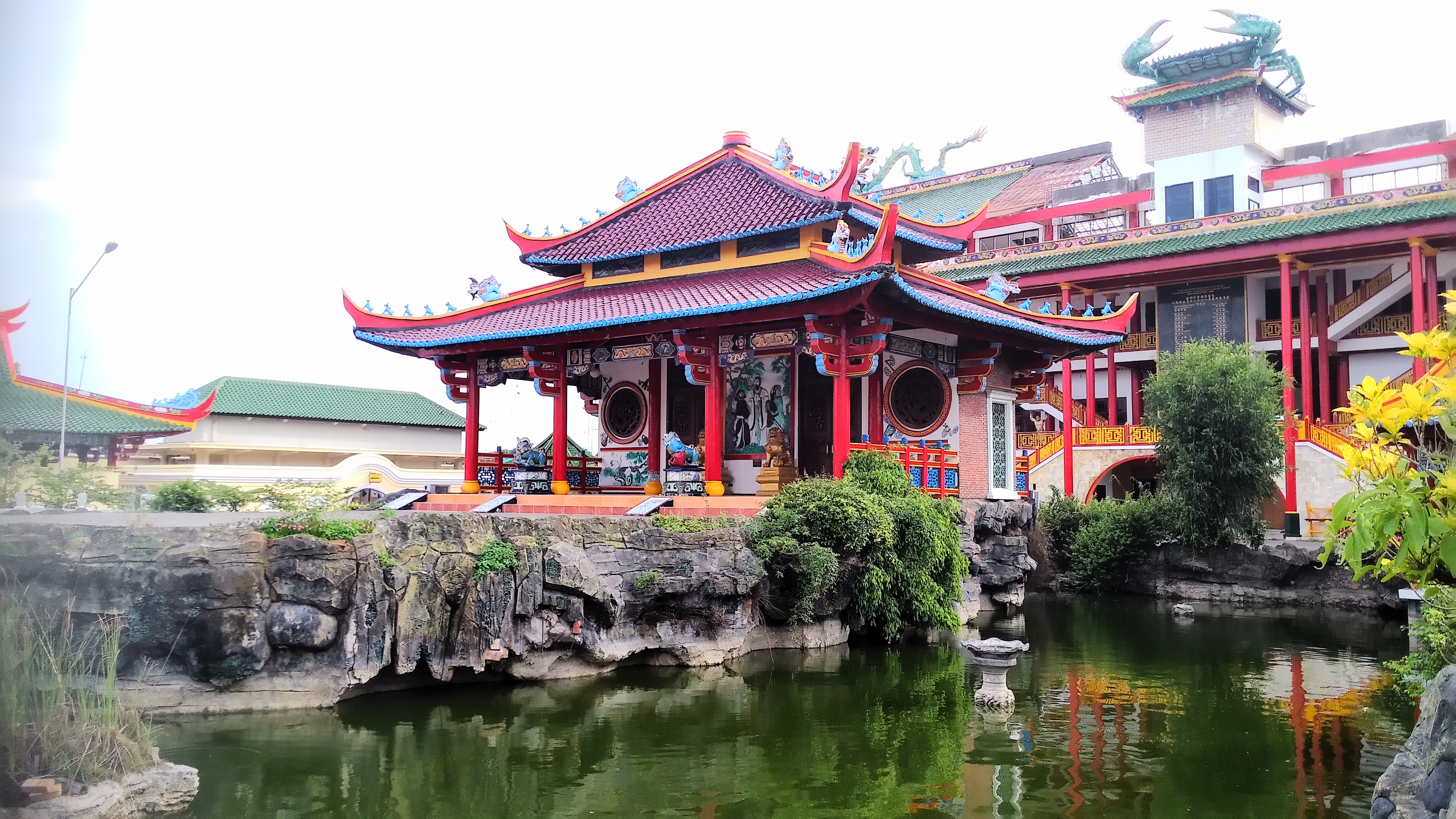
Kwan Sing Bio Chinese Temple, Tuban

== Economy ==
East Java GDP share by sector (2022)
1. Service (44.5%)
2. Manufacturing (30.6%)
3. Other Industrial (13.8%)
4. Agriculture (11.1%)

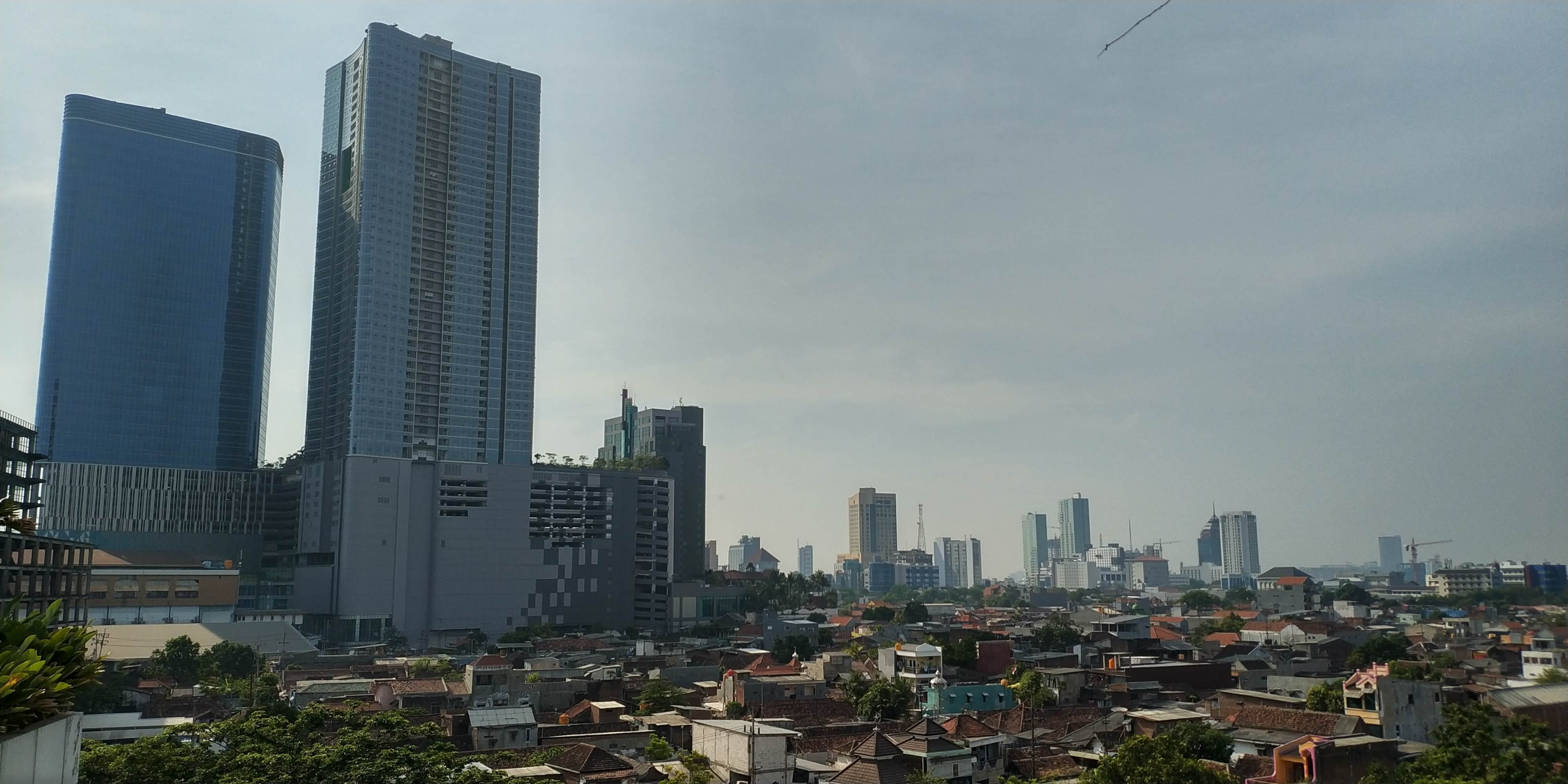
Surabaya is one of the industrial, transportational, commercial, and financial center of Indonesia.

East Java is known as the hub and center economy of Central and Eastern Indonesia, and has a high economic significance, which contributes over 15% to the Gross Domestic Product of Indonesia.

=== Industry ===
East Java has a number of large industries, including the largest shipbuilding shipyard in Indonesia, PT PAL in Surabaya, military industrial by Pindad in Southern Malang, largest railway industry in Southeast Asia, Industri Kereta Api (INKA) in Madiun, PT Tjiwi Kimia, a paper mill company based in Sidoarjo, Kertas Leces based in Probolinggo); cigarette factories (Wismilak in Surabaya, Gudang Garam in Kediri, Sampoerna in Surabaya and Bentoel in Malang). In Gresik there are Semen Gresik, and Petrokimia Gresik. In Tuban there are the largest cement factories in Indonesia, namely Semen Indonesia (ex-Semen Gresik), and Semen Holcim and the Petrochemical Refinery Area. The government has established 12 industrial estate companies, including Surabaya Industrial Estate Rungkut (SIER) in Surabaya, Pasuruan Industrial Estate Rembang (PIER) in Pasuruan Regency, Madiun Industrial Estate Balerejo (MIEB) in Madiun, Ngoro Industrial Park (NIP) in the Mojokerto Regency, Jabon Industrial Zone in Sidoarjo Regency, and Lamongan Integrated Shorebase (LIS) in Lamongan Regency. Small industrial centers are spread throughout the districts / cities, and some of them have penetrated exports; The leather craft industry in the form of bags and shoes at Tanggulangin, Sidoarjo is one of the very famous small industries.

=== Energy and power plant ===
The Cepu Block, one of the largest oil producers in Indonesia, is refined in Bojonegoro. The power plant in East Java is managed by PT Pembangkit Jawa Bali (PJB), which includes hydroelectricity power plant (Ir. Sutami, Selorejo, Bening), thermal power station in Paiton, Probolinggo Regency; which provides electricity to the Java-Bali system. Some regions develop micro hydro power plants, and solar energy.

== Transportation ==
=== Roads ===
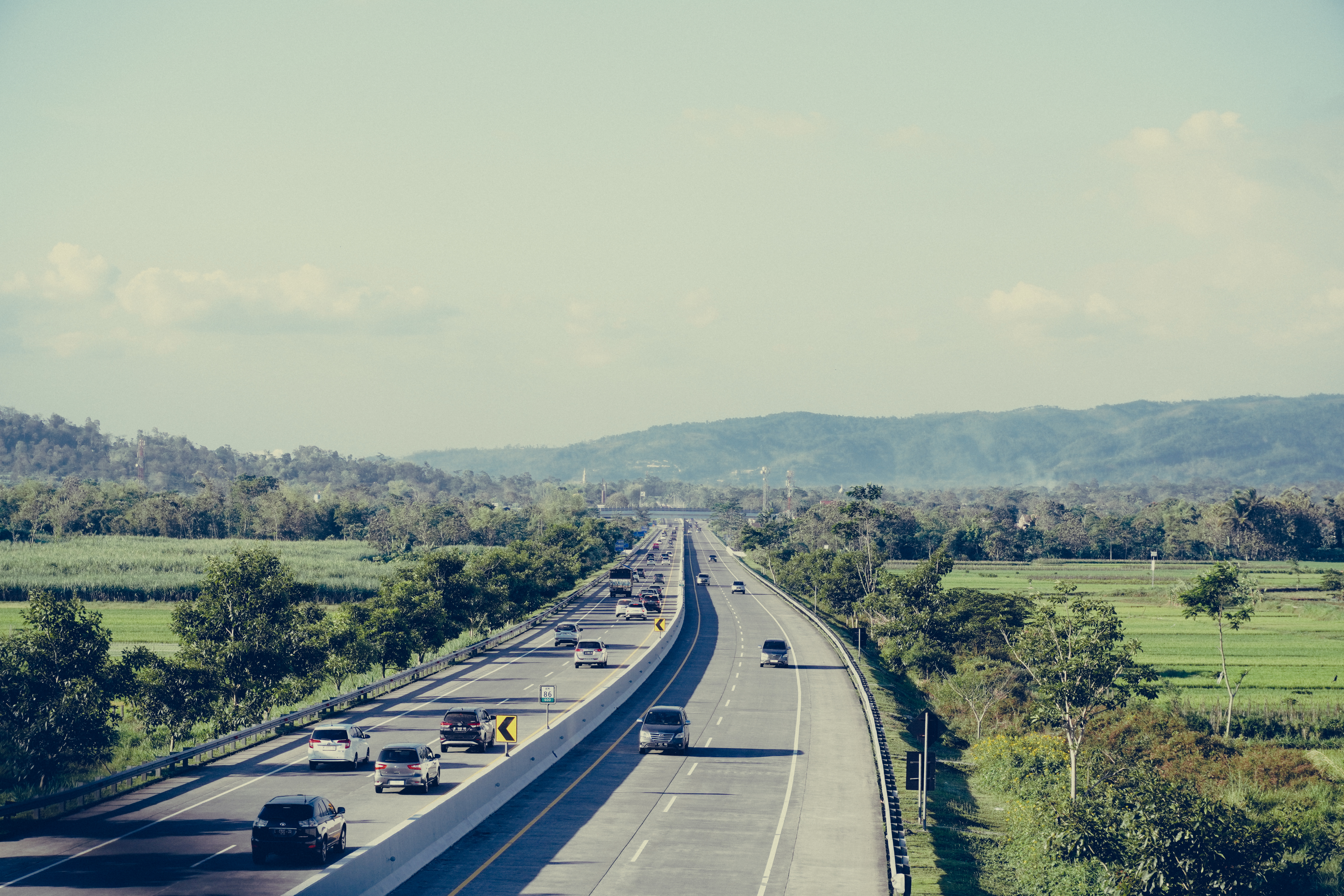
The Highway of Pandaan–Malang Toll Road

East Java is crossed by several national roads as primary arterial roads, including the northern coastal national road or locally known as pantura road (Anyer-Jakarta-Semarang-Surabaya-Banyuwangi), and inland national roads (Jakarta-Bandung-Yogyakarta-Surabaya). The expressway network in East Java covers the Surabaya-Gempol Toll Road; Gempol-Pandaan; Pandaan-Malang; Gempol-Pasuruan; and Pasuruan-Probolinggo which connects the northern and middle East Java regions with the southern and eastern salient (tapal kuda), the Surabaya-Gresik Toll Road and Krian-Manyar Toll Road that connects the middle and southern East Java to the north, and the Surabaya-Mojokerto Toll Road; Mojokerto-Kertosono; and Solo-Kertosono which connects Central Java. Suramadu Bridge that crosses the Madura Strait connects Surabaya and Madura Island. In the near future, the construction of the Probolinggo-Banyuwangi Toll Road will be realized, which is the final segment of the Trans Java Toll Road, the Krian-Legundi-Bunder-Manyar Toll Road that connects the industrial estates in the city of Surabaya; Sidoarjo Regency; and Gresik Regency, as well as plans for the Gresik-Tuban Toll Road that connects East Java with cities on the northern coast of Java.

=== Railways ===
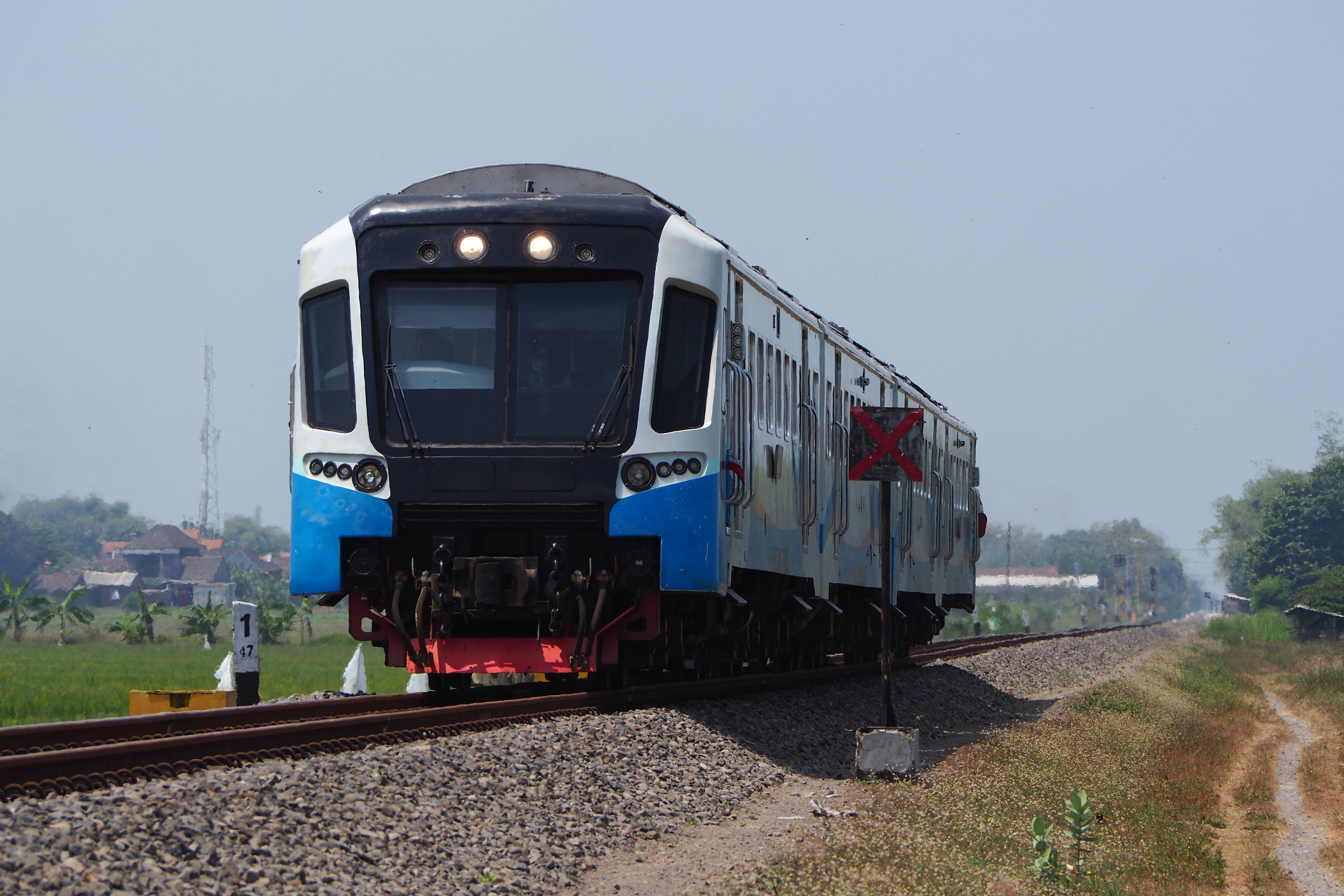
KA Jenggala train of Greater Surabaya Commuter Line passing by Sidoarjo station. This train serves the easternmost rail route in East Java specially in Greater Surabaya

The railway system in East Java has been built since the colonial era of the Dutch East Indies. The railway line in East Java consists Surabaya Commuterline of the northern line (Surabaya Pasar Turi-Semarang-Cirebon-Jakarta), the middle lane (Surabaya Gubeng-Yogyakarta-Bandung-Jakarta), the southern ring railway line (Surabaya Gubeng-Malang-Blitar-Kertosono-Surabaya), and east line (Surabaya Gubeng-Probolinggo-Jember-Ketapang). East Java also has a commuter train transportation system with Bojonegoro-Surabaya-Sidoarjo, Surabaya-Sidoarjo-Porong, Surabaya-Lamongan, Surabaya-Mojokerto, Surabaya-Malang, and Jember-Banyuwangi routes.

At present, the Surabaya Gubeng-Kertosono-Madiun line is being developed into a double track and is planned to be completed by the end of 2018 or early 2019 and ready for use in mid-2019.

=== Harbors ===
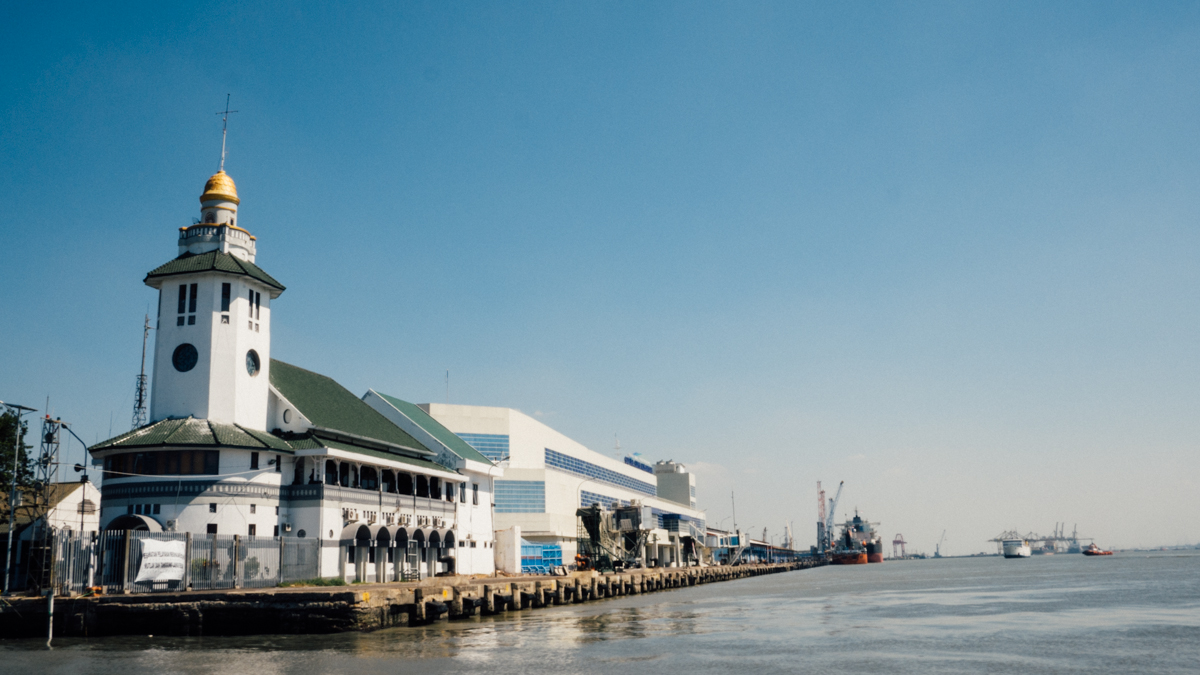
Tanjung Perak is the second busiest sea port in Indonesia after Tanjung Priok

Tanjung Perak International Port is Indonesia's main hub port in Northern Surabaya. Other international ports in East Java include Gresik Port and Java Integrated Industrial and Port Estate in Gresik Regency, Tanjung Tembaga Probolinggo Port and Banyuwangi Port. National ports are Bawean Port in Gresik Regency, Pasuruan Port in Pasuruan City, Sapudi Port in Sumenep Regency, Kalbut Port and Anchor Port in Situbondo Regency, Sapeken Port in Sumenep Regency, Kangean Port in Sumenep Regency, and Muncar Port in Banyuwangi Regency. East Java has a number of ferry ports, including Ujung Port (Surabaya), Kamal (Bangkalan, Madura) Port, Ketapang Port (Banyuwangi), Kalianget Port (Sumenep), and Jangkar Port (Situbondo). Ujung-Kamal route connects Java island (Surabaya) with Madura island, Ketapang Ferry Port connects Java Island with Bali, Jangkar-Kalianget Route connects Java (Situbondo) with Madura Island, and Kalianget also connects Madura Island with small islands in the Java Sea (Kangean and Masalembu).

=== Airports ===
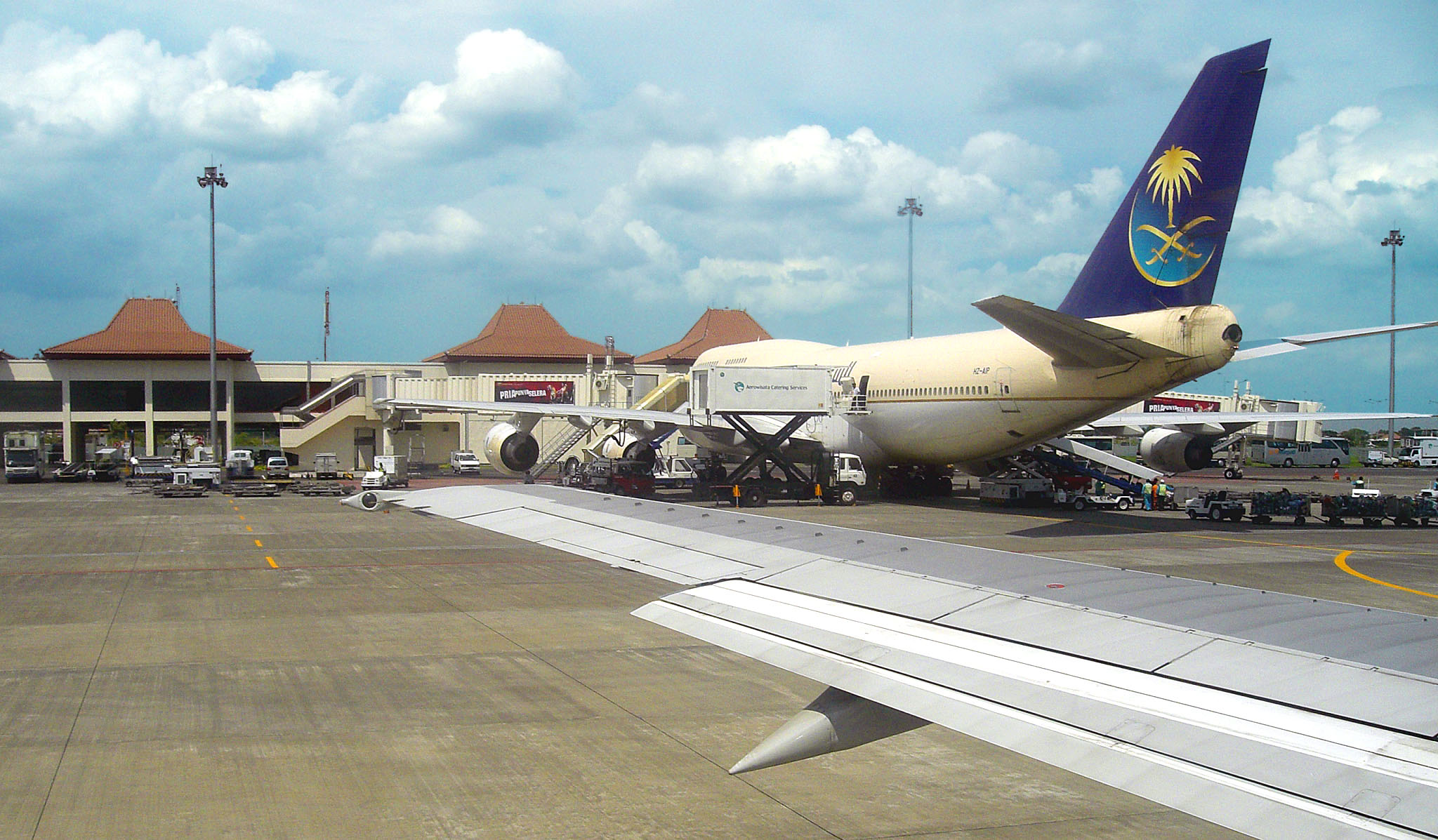
Terminal 1 of Juanda International Airport

Juanda International Airport in Sidoarjo Regency, located in the suburb of Surabaya and connects the city with major cities in Indonesia and most major cities outside Indonesia. Other international airport is Banyuwangi International Airport and Dhoho International Airport, which connects the city in Indonesia. In Malang, there is a regional airport that connects the city with Jakarta and Bali, namely Abdul Rachman Saleh Airport. In addition, there are other public airports in the province such as Notohadinegoro Airport in Jember Regency, Iswahyudi Air Force Base in Madiun Regency, Dhoho Airport in Kediri Regency, and Trunojoyo Airport in Sumenep Regency.

== Art and culture ==
=== Art ===
East Java has a number of distinctive art. Ludruk is one of the East Javanese art is quite well known, namely the art of the stage that generally all the players are male. Unlike the Ketoprak which tells the life of the palace, ludruk tells the daily life of ordinary people, often spiced with humor and social criticism, and generally opened with Dance Remo, and parikan. Currently traditional ludruk groups can be found in the area of Surabaya, Mojokerto and Jombang; although its presence increasingly defeated by modernization.

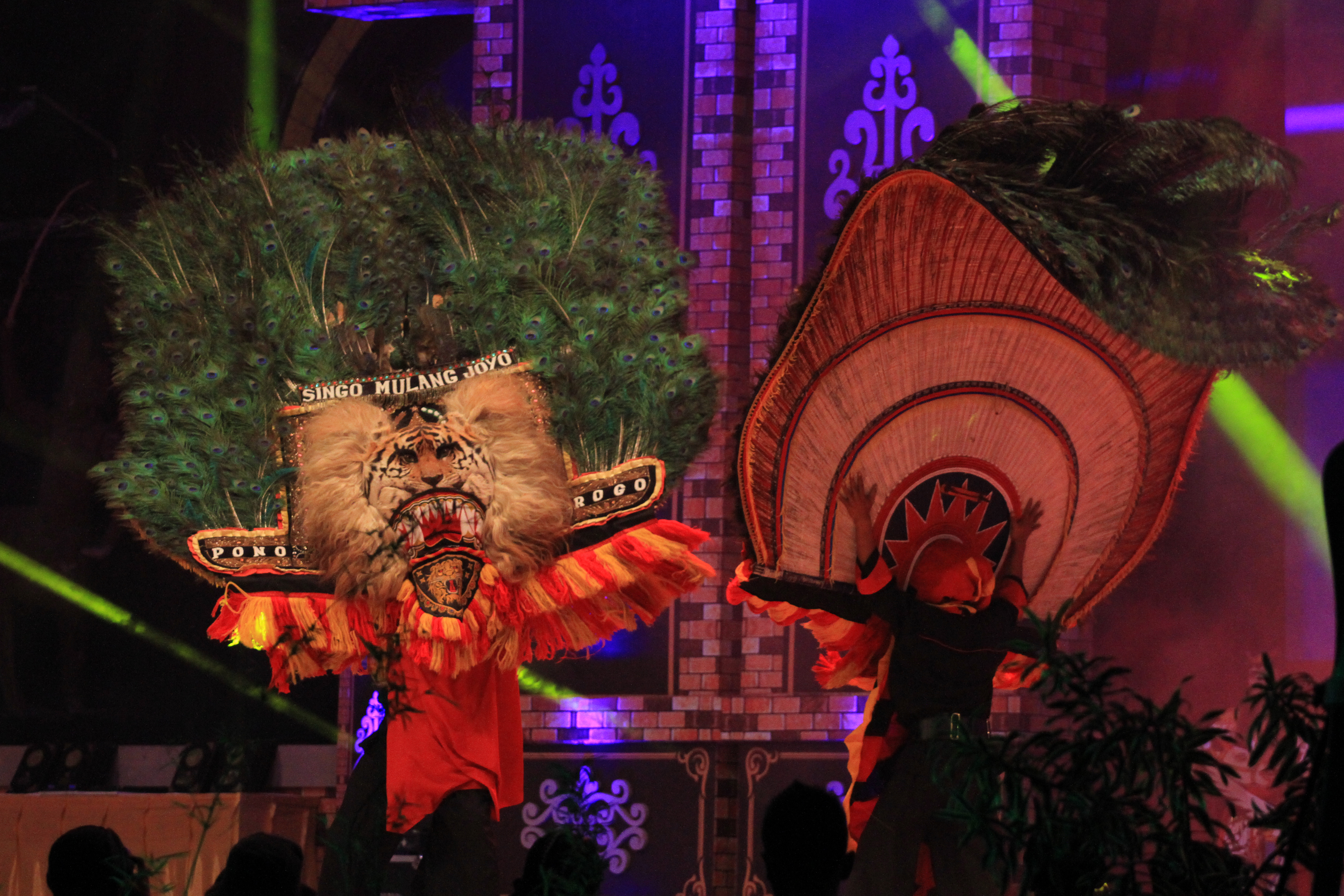
Reog Ponorogo is the famous traditional dance in East Java.

Reog from Ponorogo is a typical art that has been patented since 2001, and has now also become the icon of East Javanese art. Staging reog accompanied by horse braid (kuda lumping) are accompanied by elements of the occult. Famous arts of East Java include puppet purwa East Javanese style, mask mastermind in Madura, and made. In the area Mataraman Middle Javanese arts such as Ketoprak, and shadow puppets are quite popular. Famous legend of East Java, among others Damarwulan, Angling Darma, and Sarip Tambak-Oso.

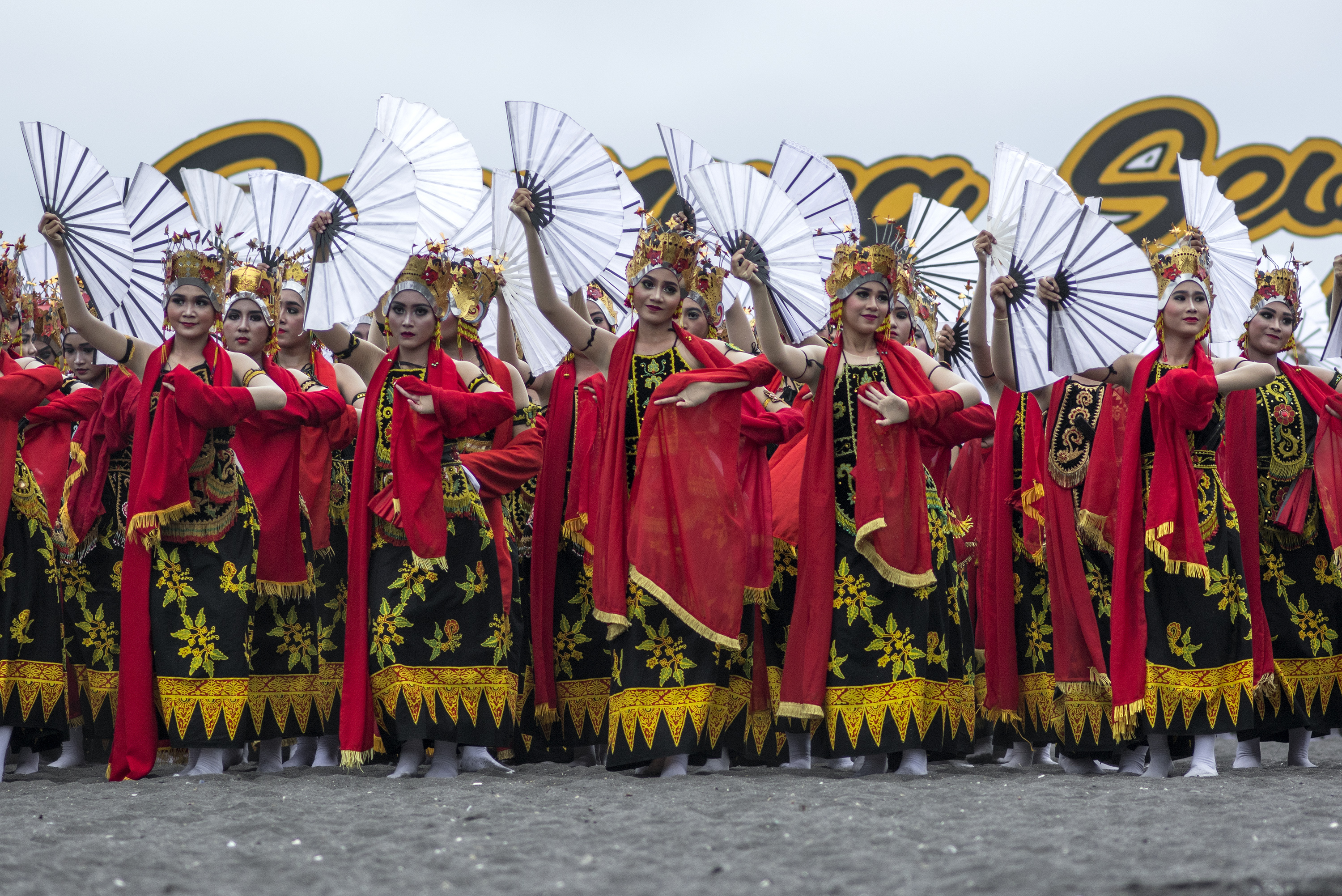
Gandrung, iconic dance in Banyuwangi.

Traditional dance in East Java can be generally grouped into Middle Javanese style, East Javanese style, Osing style and Madurese styles. Classical dances include gandrung, gambyong dance, dance srimpi, dance bondan, and wanderer. There is also a sort of lion dance culture in East Java. Art exists in two districts namely, Bondowoso, and Jember. Singo Wulung is a distinctive culture Bondowoso. While Jember have the tiger kadhuk. Both are art that is rarely encountered.

=== Culture ===
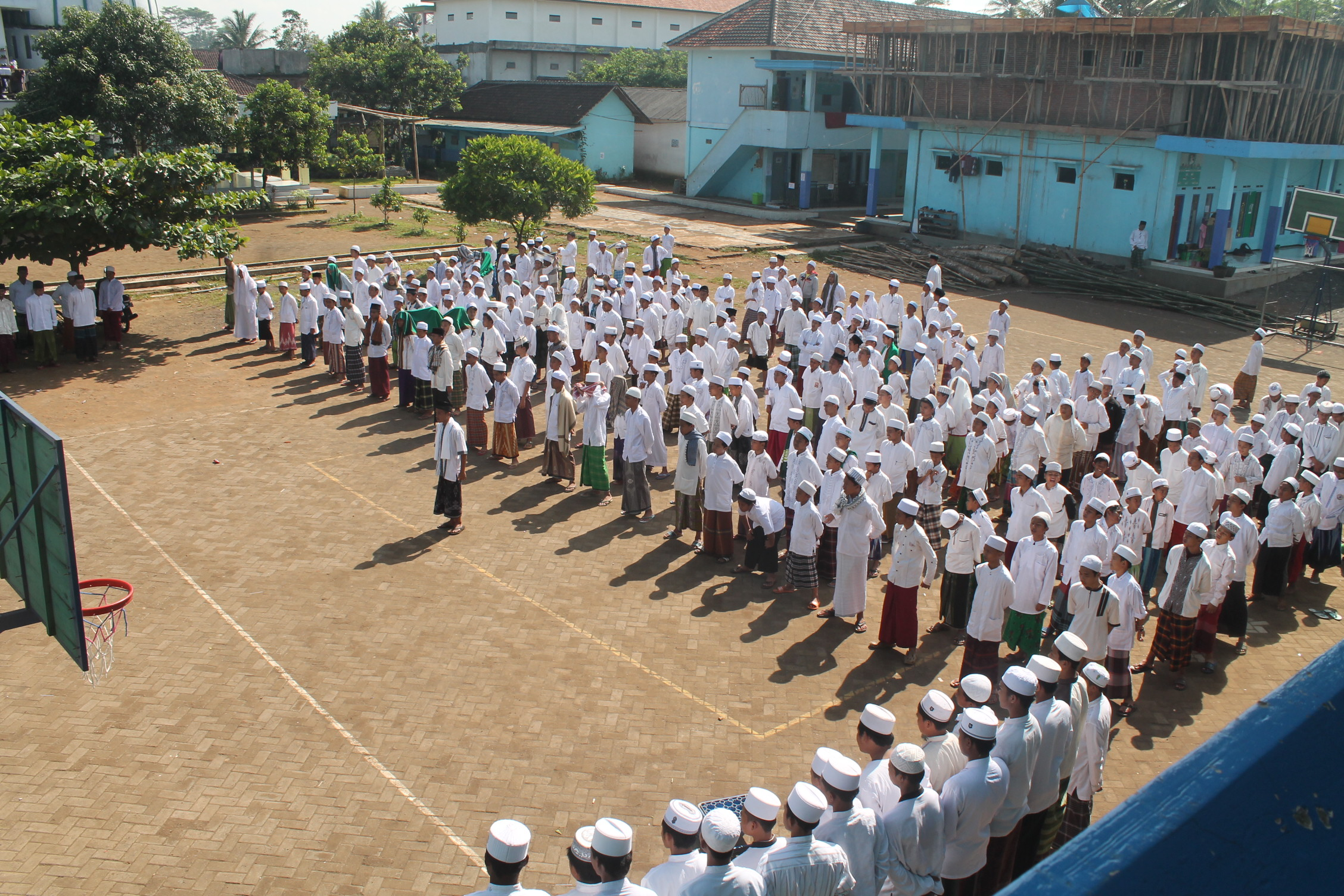
Islamic Santri students celebrate Santri day in Southern Malang

Culture and customs of Javanese in the western part of East Java received a lot of influence from the Middle Javanese, so this area is known as Mataraman, indicating that the area was once the territory of the Sultanate of Mataram. The area includes the former residency of Madiun (Madiun, Ngawi, Magetan, Ponorogo, Pacitan), ex-residency Kediri (Kediri, Tulungagung, Blitar, Trenggalek, Nganjuk), and part of Bojonegoro. As is the case in Central Java, wayang kulit, and Ketoprak quite popular in this region.

East Java's west coast region is heavily influenced by the Islamic culture. This area covers an area of Tuban, Lamongan and Gresik. In the past the north coast of East Java is the entry area, and the center of the development of Islam. Five of the nine members of the walisongo are buried in this area.

In the area of ex-residency of Surabaya (including Sidoarjo, Mojokerto and Jombang), and ex-residency Malang, had little cultural influence Mataraman, considering this region is an area arek (the term for offspring Kenarok), especially in the area of Malang that make this area difficult to be affected by Mataraman culture.

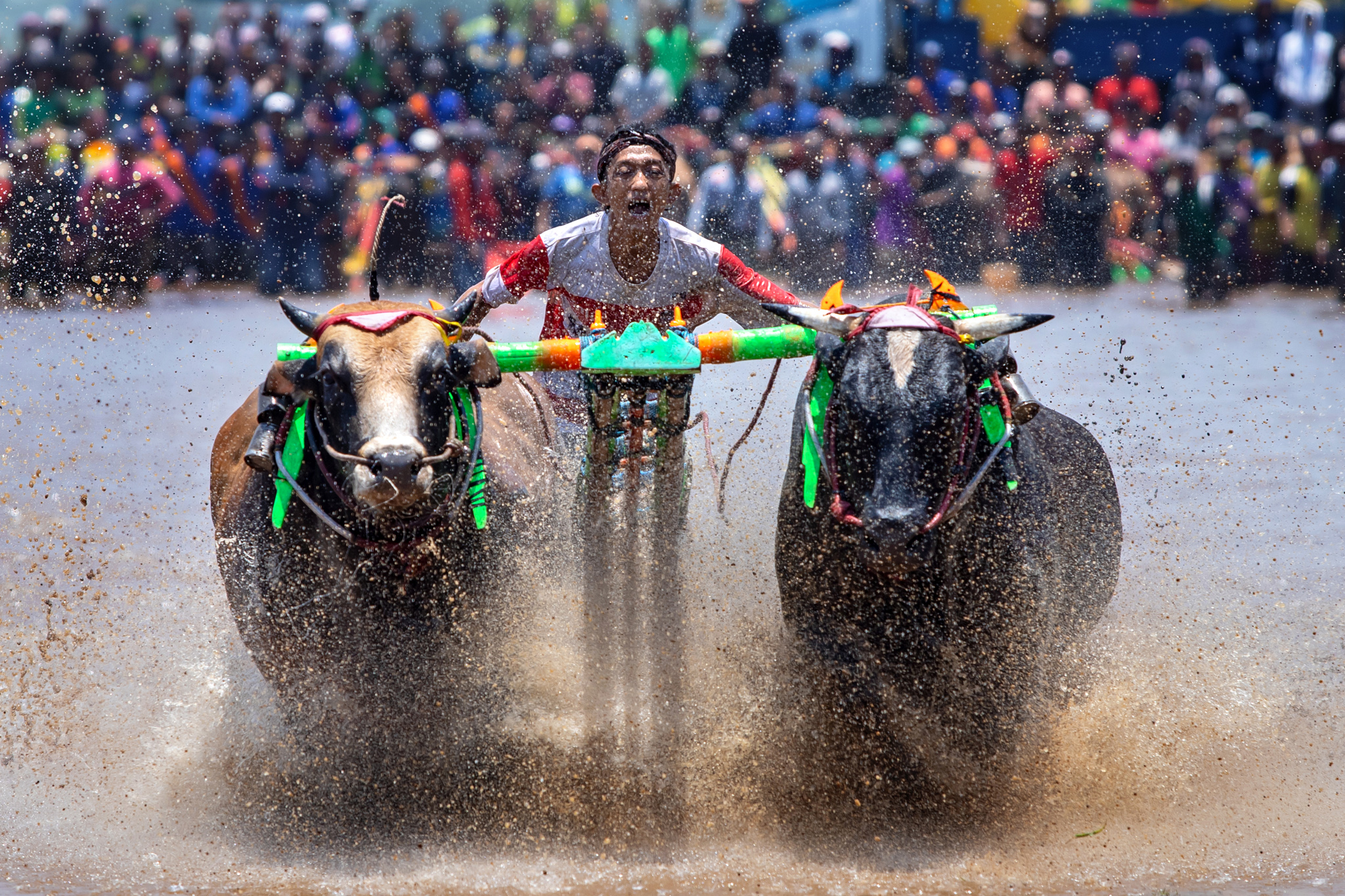
Karapan sapi is a Madurese traditional bull racing festival

Customs in horse hooves region heavily influenced by the culture of Madura, given the magnitude of Madura tribe population in the region like Karapan sapi a bull racing festival by Madurese. Osing social mores of the culture is a blend of Java. While the Tenggerese tribe is heavily influenced by Hindu culture.

Villagers in East Java, as well as in Central Java, has ties based on friendship, and territorial. Various ceremonies were held, among others: tingkepan (ceremony gestational age of seven months for the first child), babaran (ceremony before the birth of the baby), sepasaran (ceremony after the baby was five days), Pitonan (ceremony after the baby was seven months old), circumcision, fiancé.

East Java's population generally embraced monogamy. Prior to application, the men doing the show nako'ake (ask if the girl already had a husband), once that is done peningsetan (application). The wedding ceremony was preceded by a gathering or kepanggih. Communities on the west coast: Tuban, Lamongan, Gresik, even Bojonegoro has a habit of women's families applying common man (Ganjuran), different from the usual habits of other regions in Indonesia, where the men apply for women. And generally men will then be entered into the family of the woman.

To pray for the deceased person, usually a family party did send donga on day 1, 3rd, 7th, 40th, 100th, 1 year and 3 years after death.

== Education ==
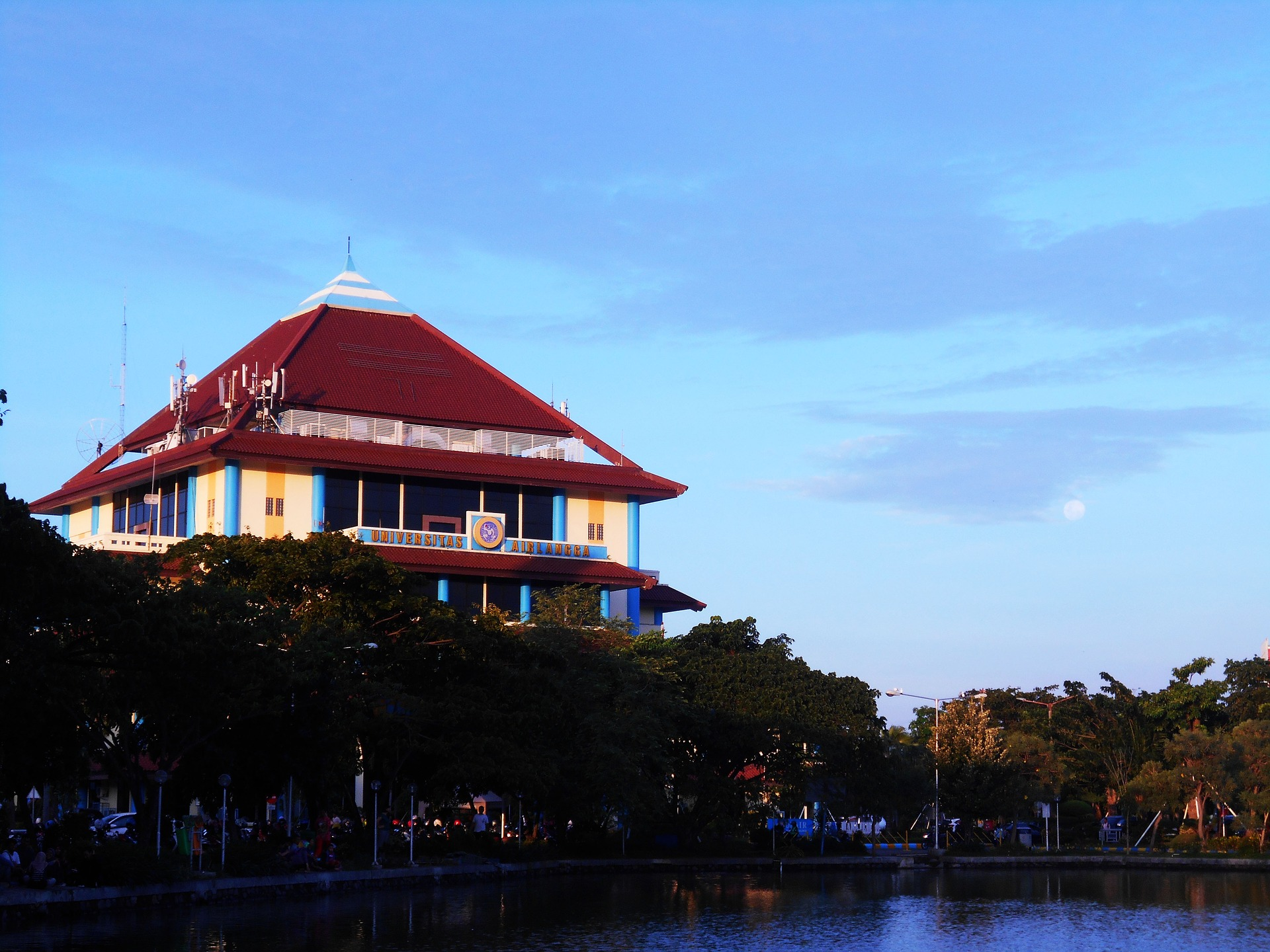
Airlangga University

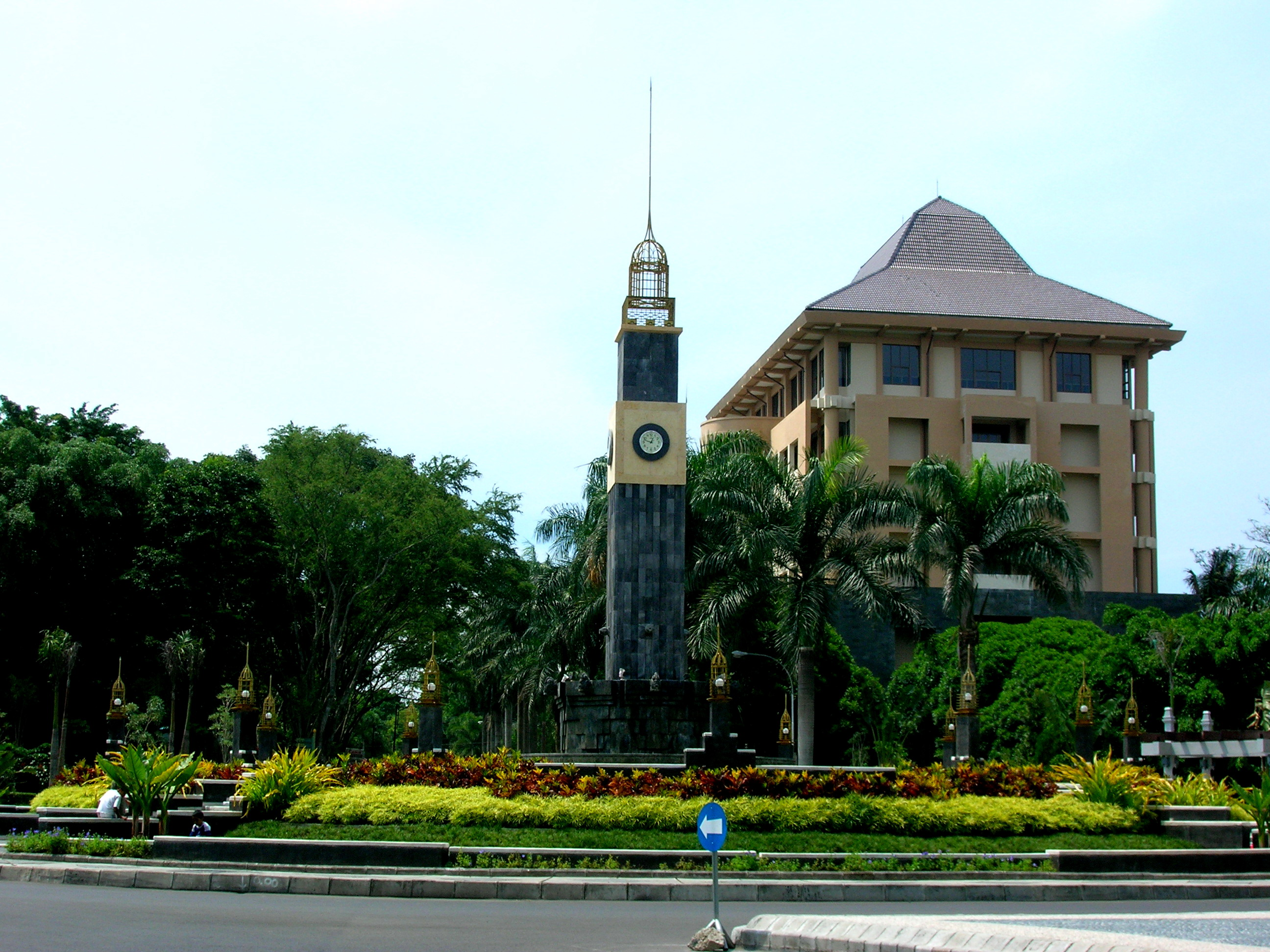
Brawijaya University

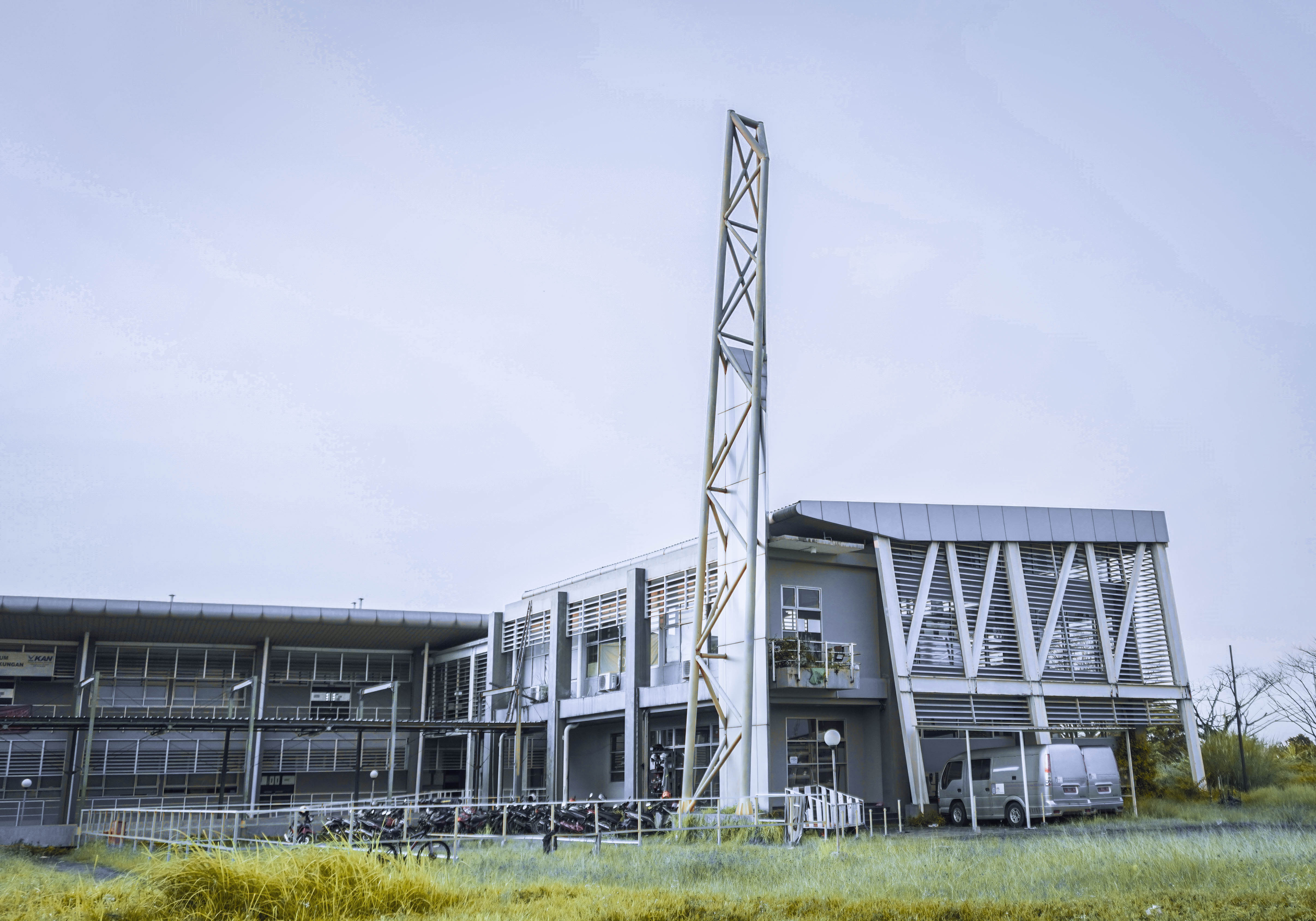
Sepuluh Nopember Institute of Technology

Major universities in East Java

East Java is the province with the highest number of public universities in Indonesia. Three major cities for universities are Surabaya, Malang, and Jember; there is also a university at Bangkalan on Madura island. Among them, notable university which are:

- Airlangga University
- Brawijaya University
- Sepuluh Nopember Institute of Technology
- State University of Surabaya
- State University of Malang
- Trunojoyo University
- University of Jember
- National Development University "Veteran" of East Java
- Sunan Ampel State Islamic University Surabaya
- Maulana Malik Ibrahim State Islamic University Malang
- University of Surabaya
- Petra Christian University
- Wijaya Kusuma University
- Widya Mandala Catholic University

Another important form of education that is available in most cities in East Java is the pesantren. This is a kind of socio-education organized by Islamic clerics, and associated with local or national Muslim organizations. Jombang and Ponorogo is a famous region for its pesantren. and the Indonesian Naval Academy (Akademi Angkatan Laut) located in Surabaya.

== Media ==
East Java supports several regional media outlets. Local newspapers with provincial news reach their readers earlier than their competitors from Jakarta. In the spirit of "providing more news from around readers", most newspapers even issue municipal sections which are different among their distribution areas. More startups media also develop for younger generation.

- Jawa Pos Group, one of the major newspaper groups in Indonesia, based in Surabaya
- Surya, newspaper based in Surabaya (owned by Kompas Group)
- Suara Surabaya (E100 FM), local radio and internet news in Surabaya and East Java
- IDN Times, multiplatform media for millennials and generation z people

== Tourism ==
Malang metropolitan region is a famous tourist destination in Indonesia with the City of Batu as its center.

East Java has a number of interesting sights. One of the tourist icon is Mount Bromo in East Java, which is inhabited by the Tengger tribe, where the ceremony is held every year Kasada. In the mountainous region of Tengger also there is a waterfall that is Madakaripura which is the last hermitage Mahapatih Gajah Mada before serving in the kingdom of Majapahit. Madakaripura Waterfall has a height of about 200 meters, which makes it the highest waterfall on the island of Java and the second highest in Indonesia. East Java also has some other mountainous tourist area of which is Malang Raya mountainous area known as the natural mountain tourist area that includes Malang and Batu. Tretes and Trawas mountainous areas, are also known to have characteristics such as Puncak area in West Java province. Other natural attractions in East Java is the National Park (4 of 12 National Parks in Java) and Taman Safari Indonesia II in Prigen.

East Java is also contained relics of history in the classical era. Trowulan sites in Mojokerto, once the center of the Majapahit Kingdom, there are dozens of temples and tombs of the kings of Majapahit. Other temples spread throughout much of East Java, including Penataran temple in Blitar. In Madura, Sumenep is the center of the kingdom of Madura, where there are Kraton Sumenep, museums, and the tombs of the kings of Madura (Asta Tinggi Sumenep).

East Java is known for its coastal scenery. On the south coast there is the Prigi Beach, Pelang Beach and Pasir Putih Beach in Trenggalek, Popoh Beach in Tulungagung, Ngliyep Beach, and tourism areas such as the Jatim Park, Museum Angkut, Batu Secret Zoo, Batu Night Spectacular, Eco Green Park in Batu, and the Watu Ulo Beach in Jember. East Java also has a beach that the waves is one of the best in the world, namely the Plengkung Beach located in Banyuwangi. In addition there Kenjeran Beach in Surabaya, and the White Sand Beach in Situbondo. Lake in East Java, among others Sarangan in Magetan, Ir. Sutami Dam in Malang, and Selorejo Dam in Blitar.

In the coastal area of the north there are a number of tombs of the saints, which are places of pilgrimage for Muslims. Five of the nine walisongo are buried in East Java: Sunan Ampel in Surabaya, Sunan Giri, and Maulana Malik Ibrahim in Gresik, Sunan Drajat in Paciran (Lamongan), and Sunan Bonang in Tuban. In the northern coastal region, there are a number of caves, including Maharani Cave in Lamongan and Tuban Akbar Cave and Cave Gong located in Pacitan. Other pilgrimage sites include the tomb of Indonesia's first president Sukarno, in Blitar, as well as the tomb of the fourth Indonesian president Abdurrahman Wahid, known as Gus Dur, in Jombang.

Malang Metropolitan Region is a leading tourist destination in Indonesia with the City of Batu as its center. Malang has various tourist areas including volcanoes to beaches, as well as man-made tour of the history of travel to an international-class theme park with the support of inter-provincial transportation via trains, buses, and airplanes are available in Malang. Surabaya is the center of government, entertainment, financial, and business center of East Java, where there are Tugu Pahlawan, the Museum MPU Tantular, Surabaya Zoo, Submarine Monument, Ampel Region, and the Downtown Tunjungan area.

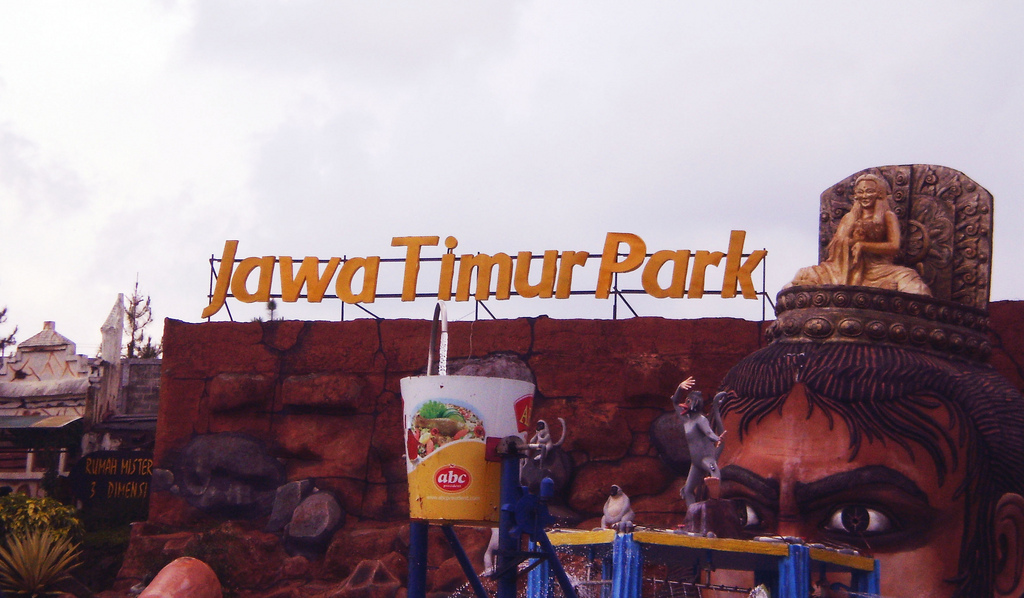
Jawa Timur Park in Batu

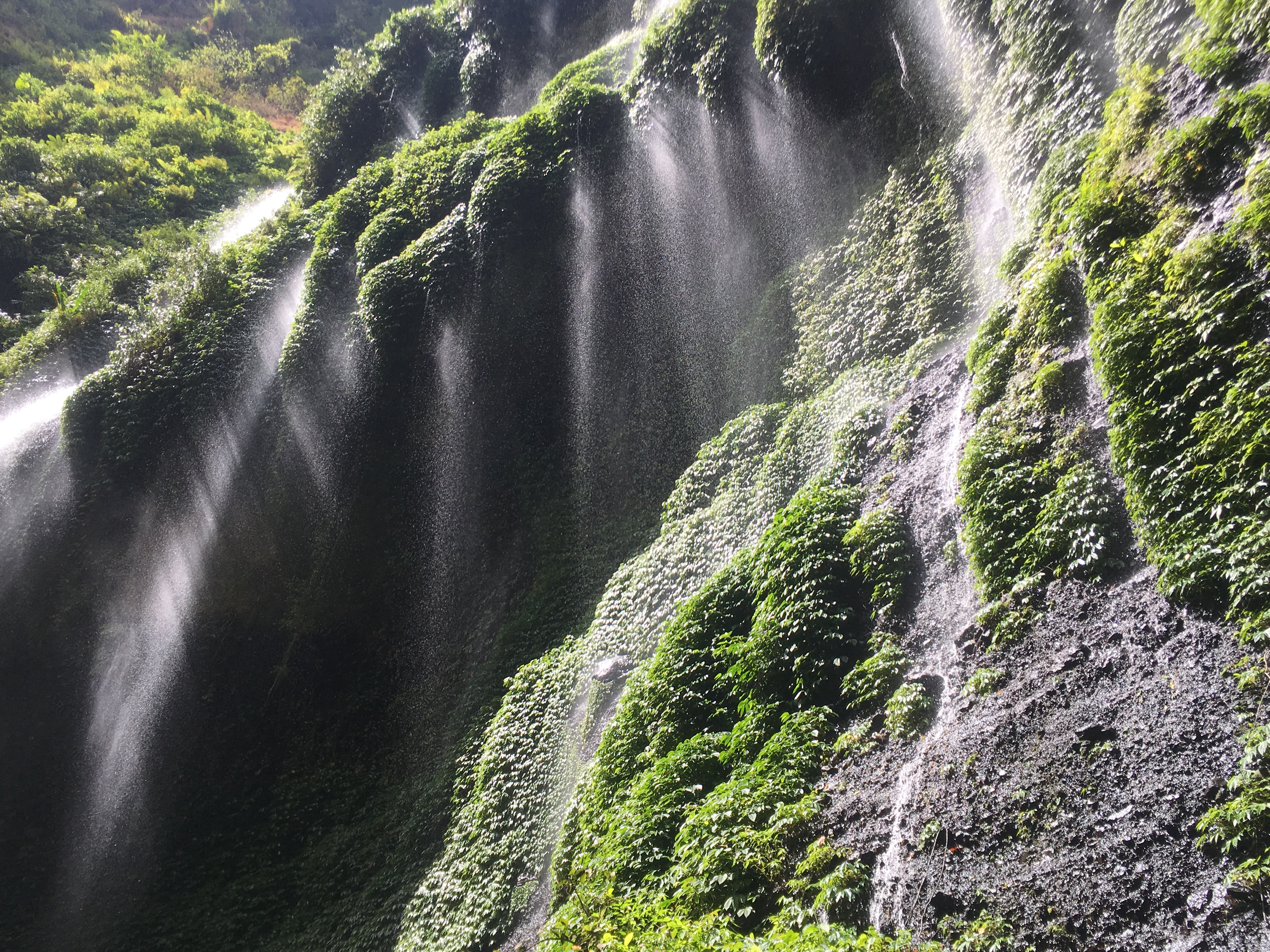
Madakaripura waterfall in Probolinggo

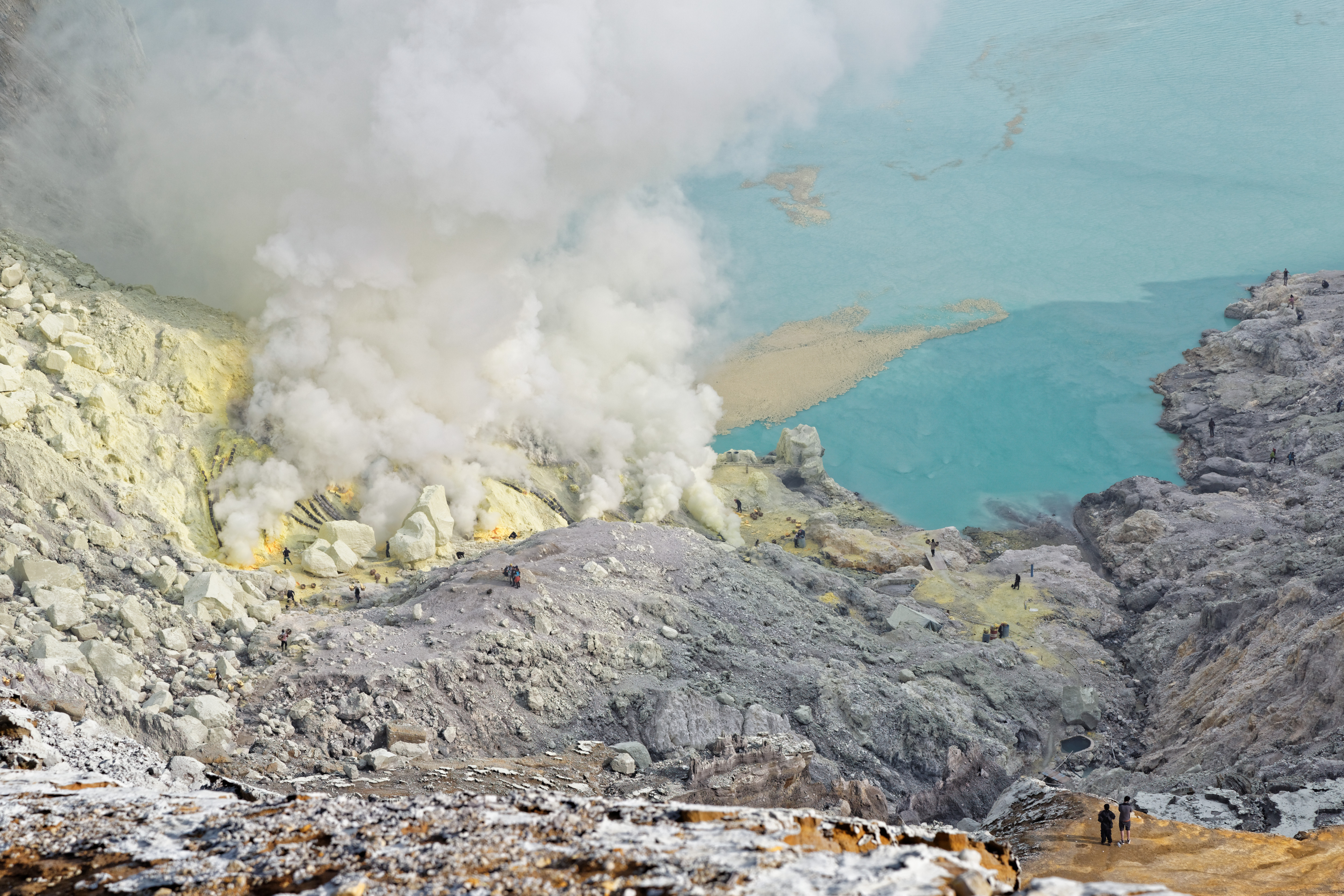
Ijen crater in Banyuwangi

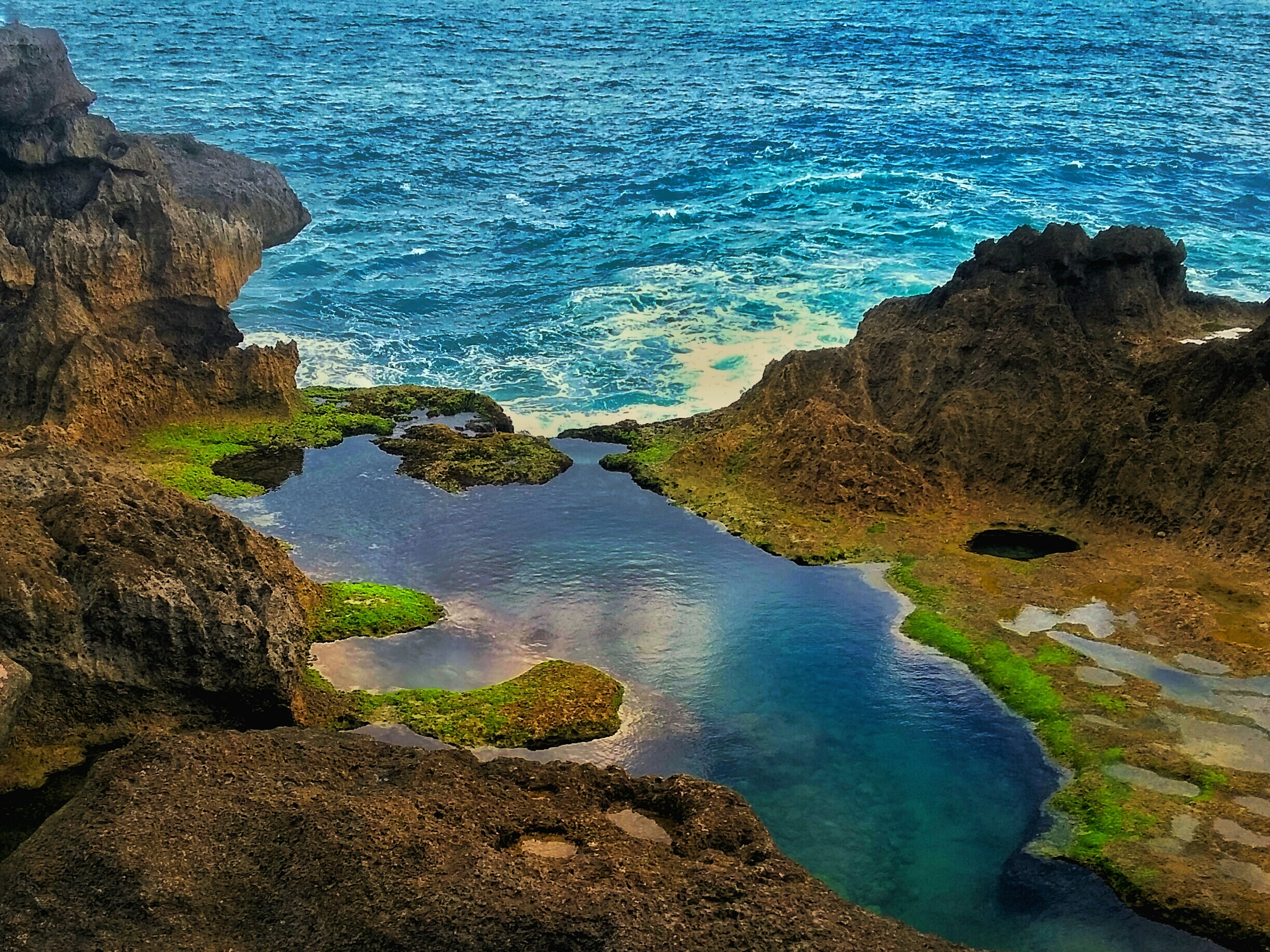
Kedung Tumpang beach in Tulungagung

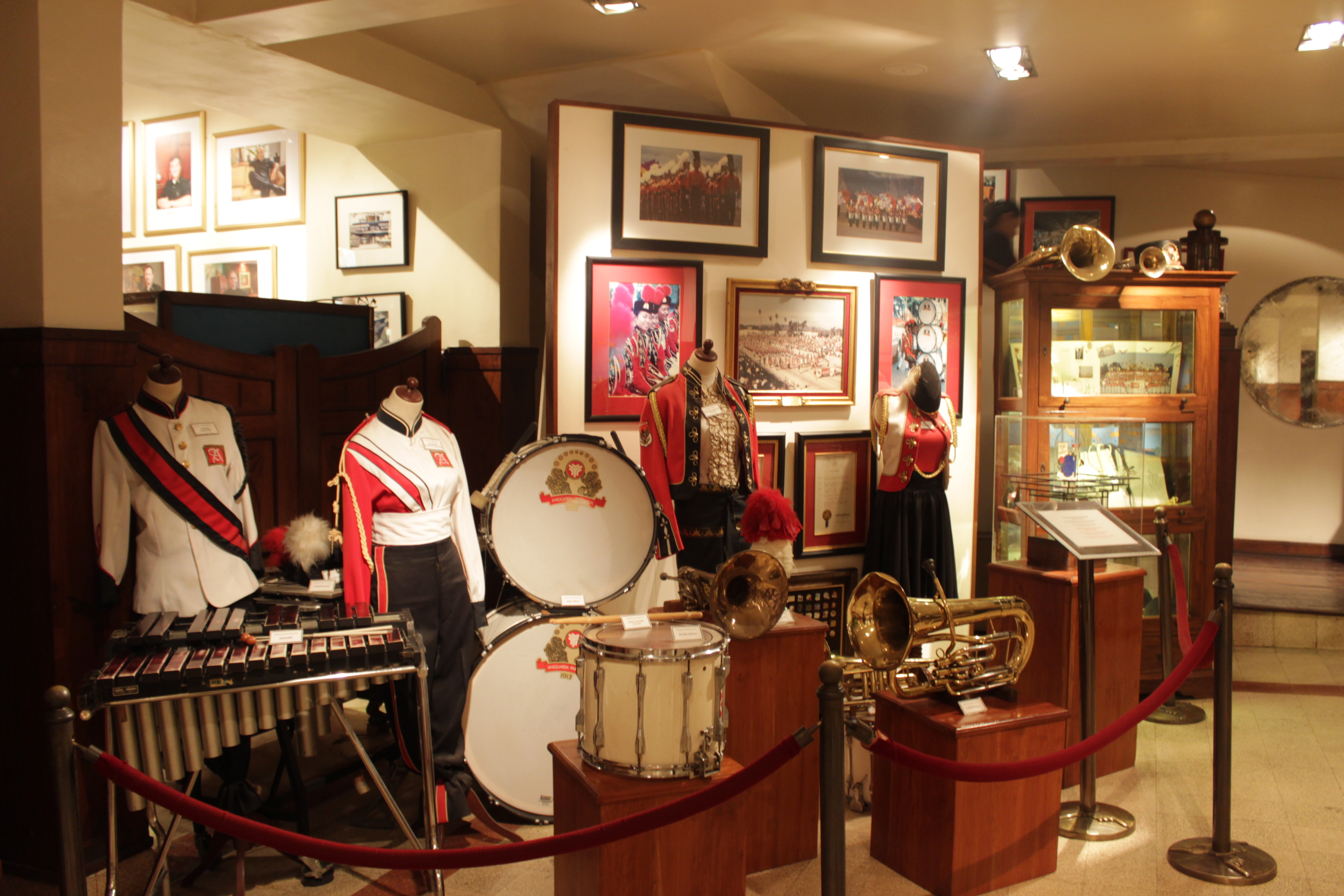
House of Sampoerna, Surabaya

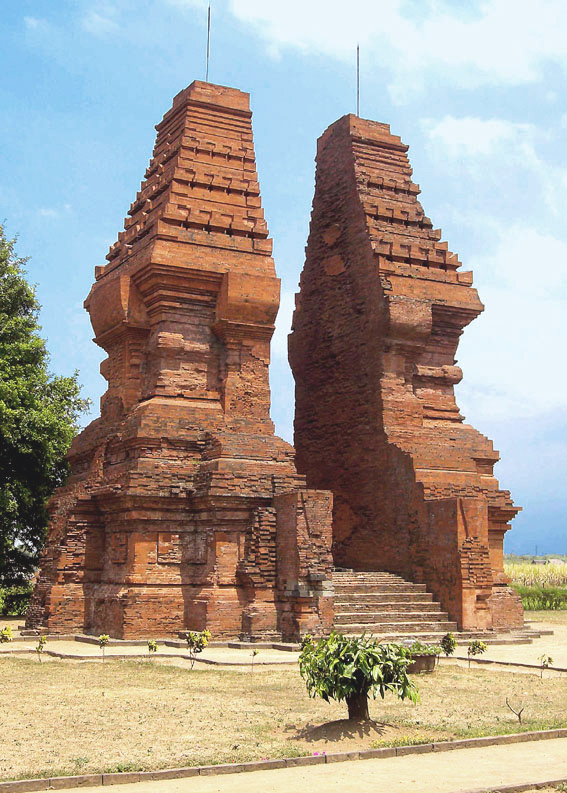
Trowulan, the capital of the Majapahit Empire, is one of the largest archaeological sites in East Java

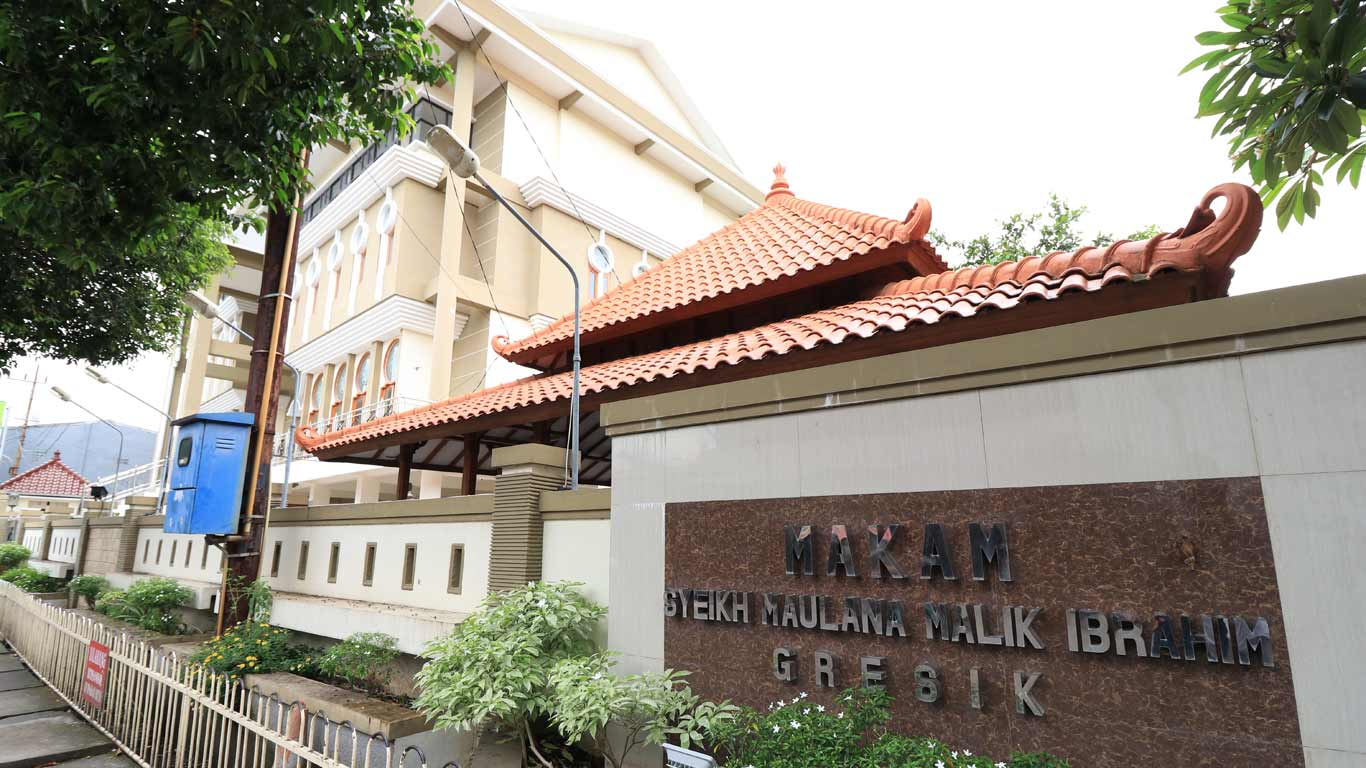
Maulana Malik Ibrahim tomb complex

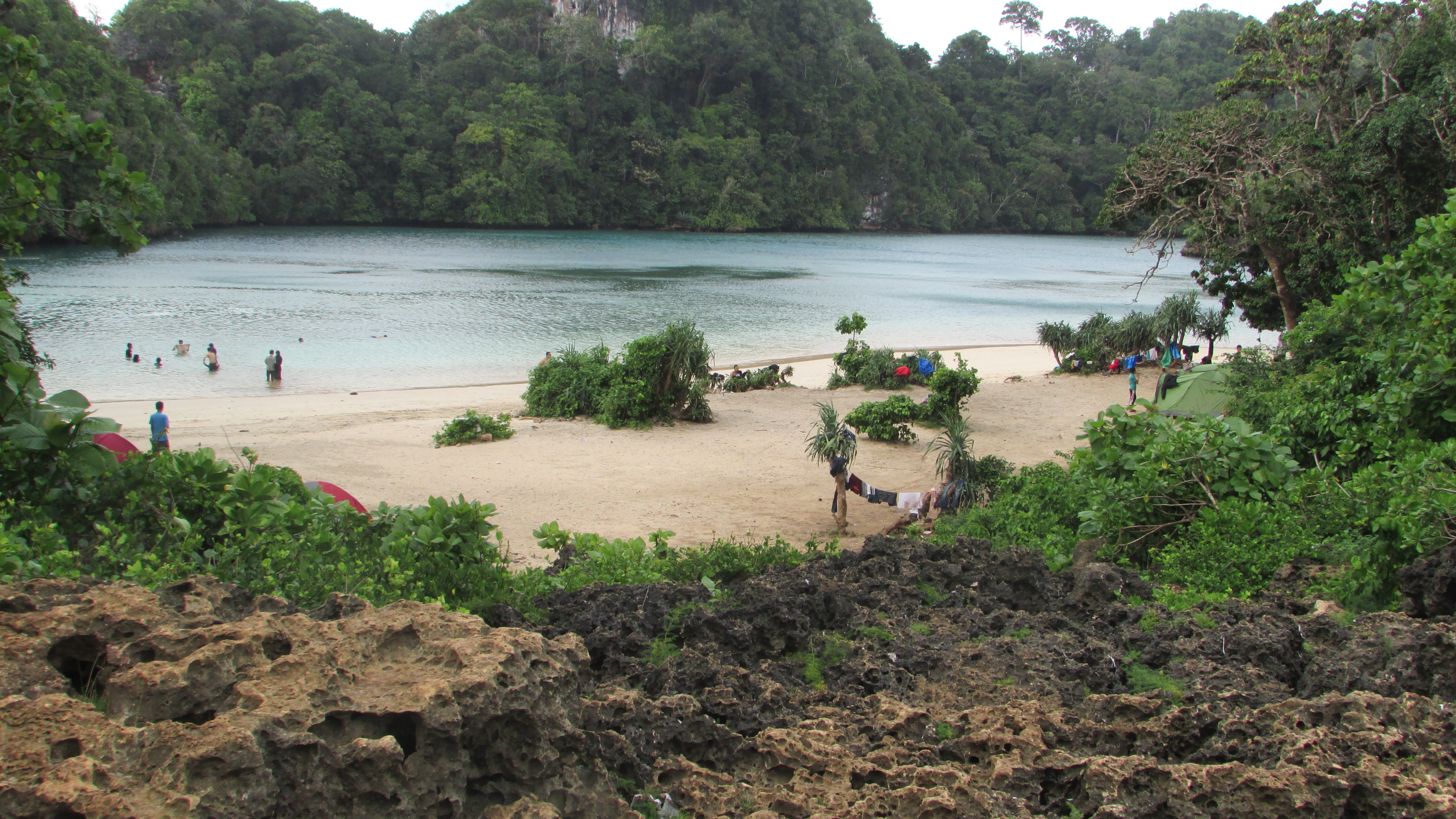
Sempu Island, a tourist island in Malang Regency

== National parks ==
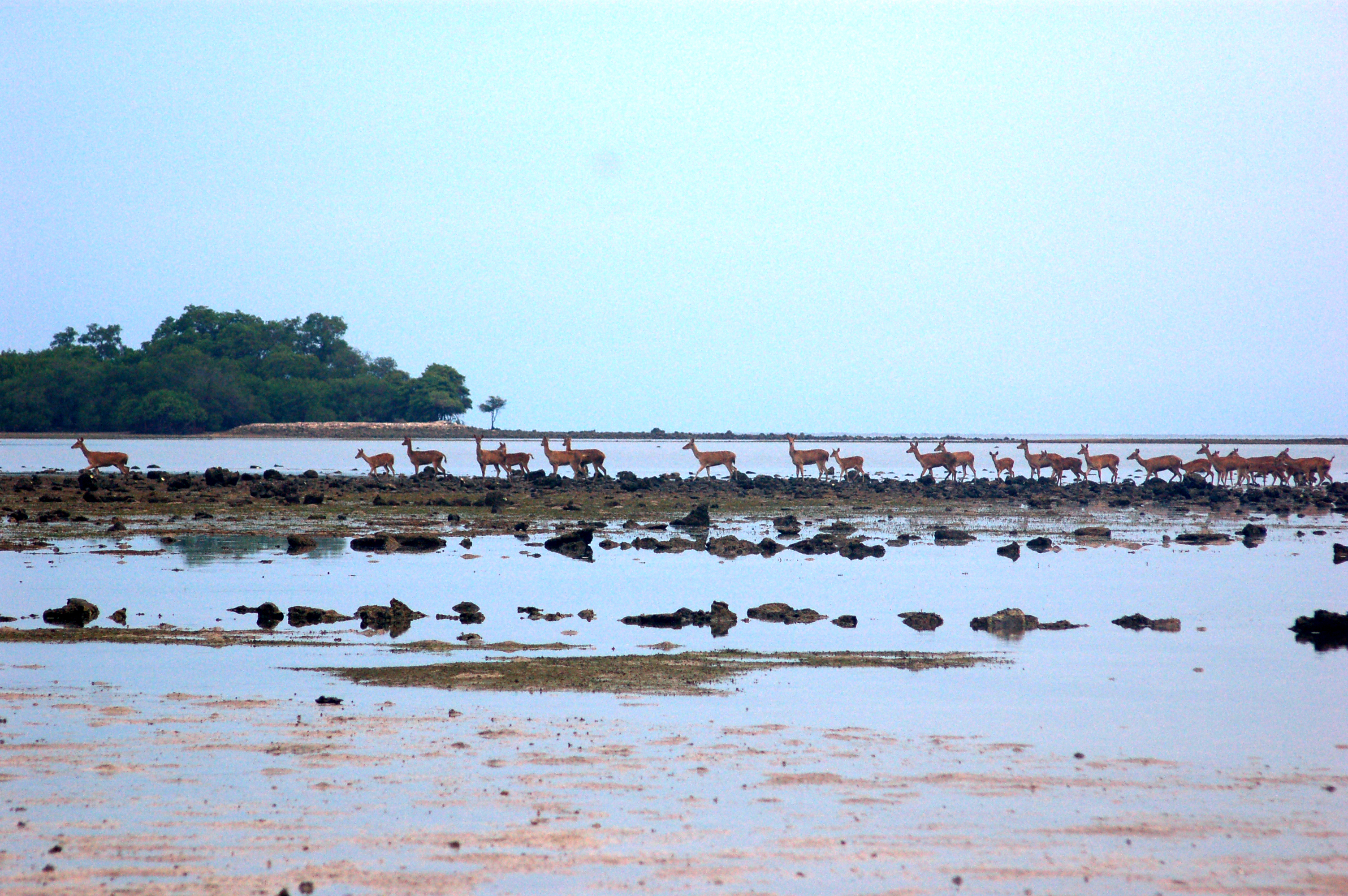
Deer in Baluran National Park

- Meru Betiri National Park – Between Jember and Banyuwangi districts, this park covers 580 km^{2} (224 sq mi). Hard to get to, it contains coastal rainforest and scenery and is home to abundant wildlife.
- Alas Purwo National Park – This 434 km^{2} (168 sq mi) park is formed by the Blambangan Peninsula (southeastern Java). Comprising mangrove, savanna, lowland monsoon forests and beaches, the park's name means First Forest in Javanese. Javanese legend says that the earth first emerged from the ocean here.
- Baluran National Park – This 250 km^{2} (97 sq mi) national park is located in northeastern Java, known as The Little Africa, formerly extensive savanna has been largely replaced by Acacia.
- Bromo Tengger Semeru National Park – Located in East Java at the region of Probolinggo and Pasuruan, 70 km (43 mi) from Surabaya the capital city of East Java province. Mount Bromo is one of the great hiking and trekking destinations for overseas tourists. The scenic view of Bromo also attracts hundreds of photo enthusiasts to see the views there.
- Raden Soerjo Grand Forest Park—This is located between Pasuruan, Mojokerto and Batu. Covered Mount Arjuna, Mount Welirang, Mount Penanggungan, Mount Anjasmoro, Mount Kawi, and Mt. Kelud.
- Purwodadi Botanical Garden is a research center in Pasuruan, East Java, Indonesia. It has an area of 85 hectares (210 acres) and more than 10,000 types of trees and many plant collections. Callus cultures of Agave amaniensis by Setia Dewi were taken in 1988.

== Cuisine ==
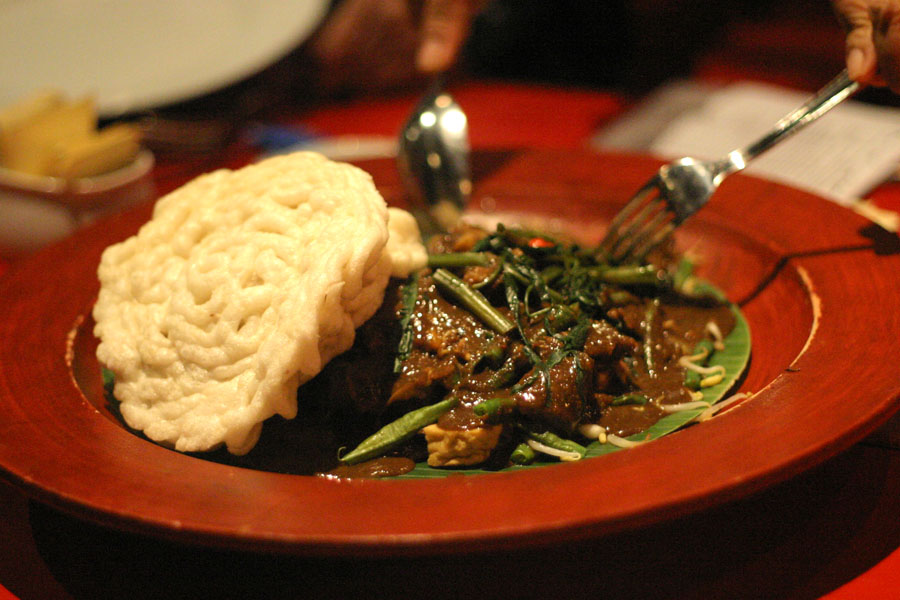
Rujak Cingur, traditional dish from East Java

Some typical East Javanese dishes include Bakso Malang, Rawon, and Tahu Campur Lamongan. Surabaya is famous for Rojak Cingur, Semanggi, Lontong Balap, clam satay, mussels, and rice cakes. Malang is popular for a variety of processed fruits (especially apples), tempeh crisps, Bakpao telo, Bakso Malang, rawon, and Cwie noodles. Kediri is famous for tahu takwa, tahu pong, tungku fried rice and getuk pisang. Madiun is known for pecel madiun, and as a producer of Brem. The subdistrict of Babat, Lamongan is famous as a producer of wingko. Bondowoso is also well known as a producer of tape. Gresik famous is for nasi krawu, otak-otak bandeng, and bonggolan. Sidoarjo is famous for shrimp crackers, shrimp paste, and petis. Ngawi is famous for tempeh chips, tahu tepo, and nasi lethok. Blitar has the typical food that is pecel. Rambutan is also native to Blitar. Banyuwangi is famous for sego tempong, salad soup, and pecel rawon. Jember have special food made of tape that is Suwar-suwir and tape proll that is very sweet. Corn is known as one of the staple food of the Madurese, while cassava is processed into gaplek, a staple food used to be a part of the population in Pacitan and Trenggalek. Tulungagung is famous for its lodho, goat satay and pati rice. Ponorogo is famous for Satay Ponorogo, Tiwul Goreng and Dawet Jabung, Probolinggo is famous for Ketan Kratok, Olok Crab, Glepungan Rice and Kraksaan Soto.

== Sports ==
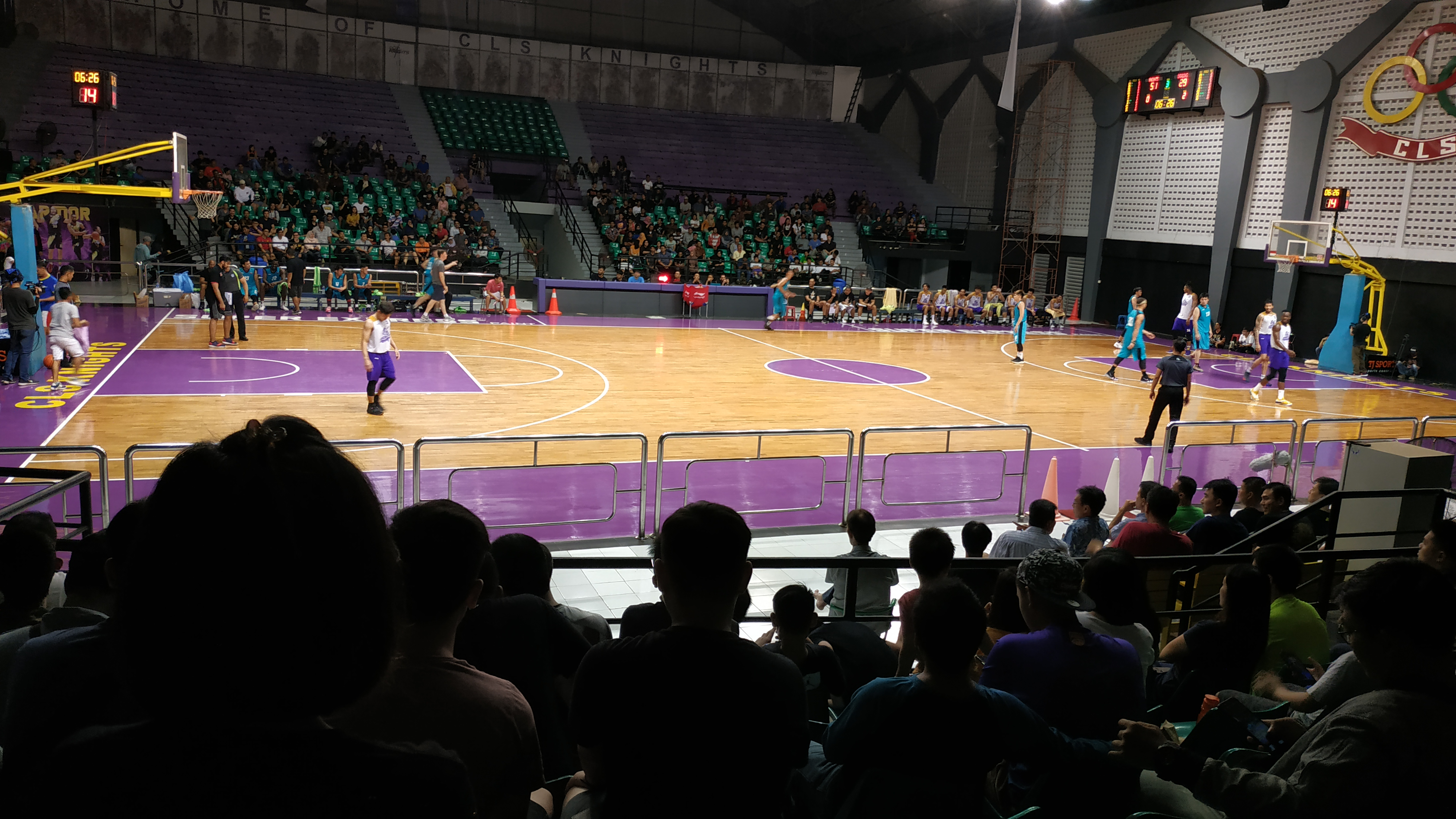
CLS Knights, most famous professional basketball club in Indonesia.

East Java is the province with the highest number of professional football clubs in Indonesia and also province with clubs in top division league. By 2023–24 Liga 1 (Indonesia), Indonesian First League clubs from East Java are Persik, Madura United, Arema, and Persebaya. Arema and Persebaya are football clubs from East Java who have become top teams in Indonesia by repeatedly winning championships and national competitions and often as representatives of Indonesia in AFC Champions League and AFC Cup between clubs in Asia.

East Java once hosted the Indonesian National Games (Indonesian: Pekan Olahraga Nasional), namely PON VII in 1969, and PON XV in 2000, and became the overall champion of PON in 2000, and 2008. Since 1996 the East Java Football Team always won medals gold was included in 2008, and was recorded as the fourth gold medal received consecutively.

East Java has several professional basketball clubs, mainly in Surabaya. The famous basketball clubs namely CLS Knights Indonesia and Pacific Cesar Surabaya. East Java is also the venue for several bicycle racing events namely Tour de East Java and Tour de Ijen.

Other sports such as volleyball in East Java also have superior clubs, namely Surabaya Samator and Gresik Petrokimia Pupuk Indonesia. Apart from that, in the futsal sport there are two well-known clubs, namely Bintang Timur Surabaya Futsal Club and Unggul Futsal Club. In badminton, there is the Surya Naga Surabaya club which also contributes a number of national badminton athletes.

== International relations ==
East Java is twinned with:

- Western Australia, Australia – 1993.
- Shanghai, China – 2006.

== See also ==
- Districts of East Java
