= Islam in East Java =

Religion in Indonesia

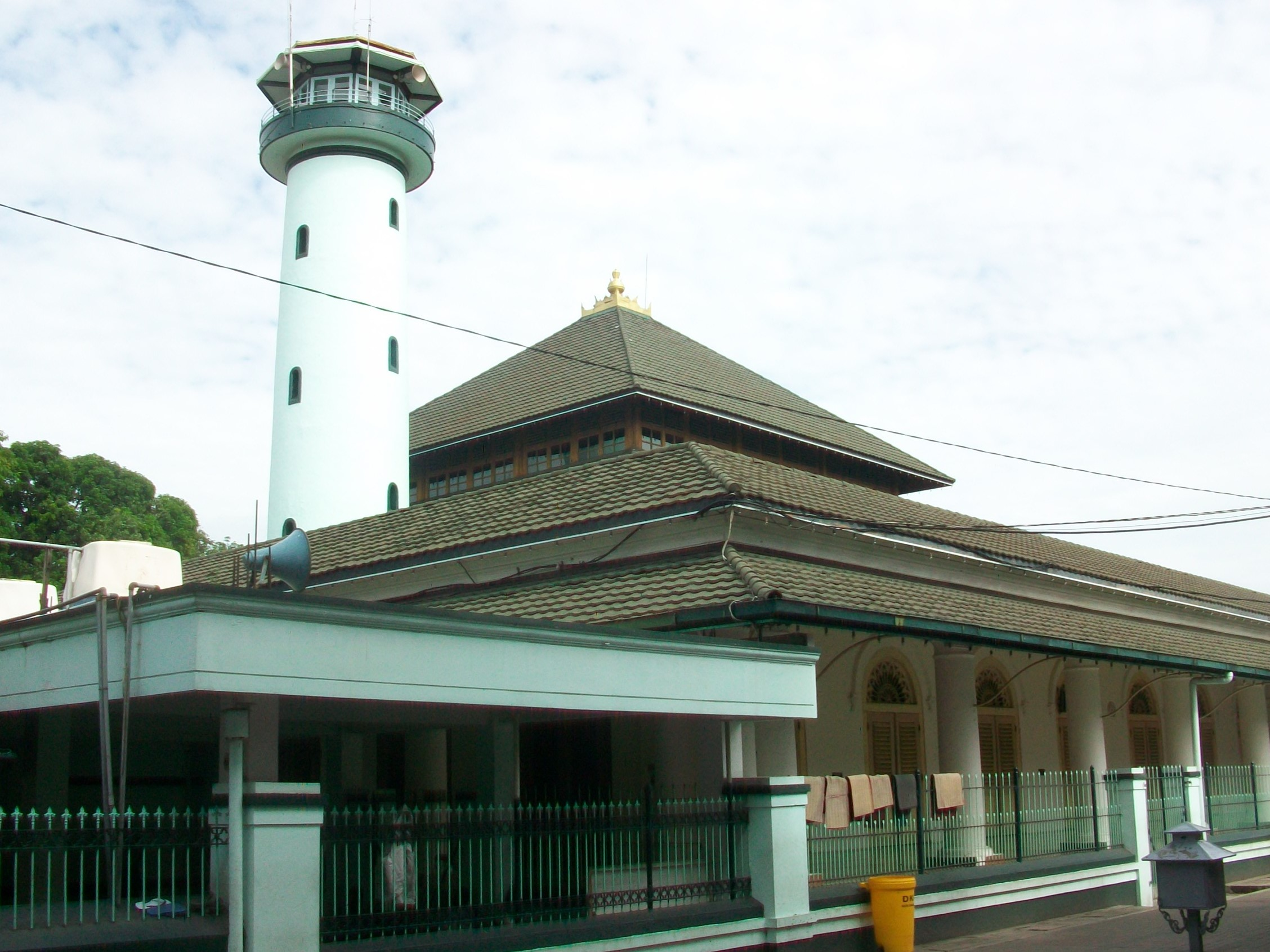
Built in 1421, Ampel Mosque in Surabaya is the oldest surviving mosque in Java, and the second-oldest in Indonesia.

Islam is the most common religion in the Indonesian province of East Java, embraced by 96.7% of the whole population. Throughout its history, East Java has been considered one of the heartlands of Islam in Indonesia; the province experienced one of the earliest proliferations of Islam, as well as the establishment of the largest Islamic mass organization in Indonesia, Nahdlatul Ulama.

== History ==
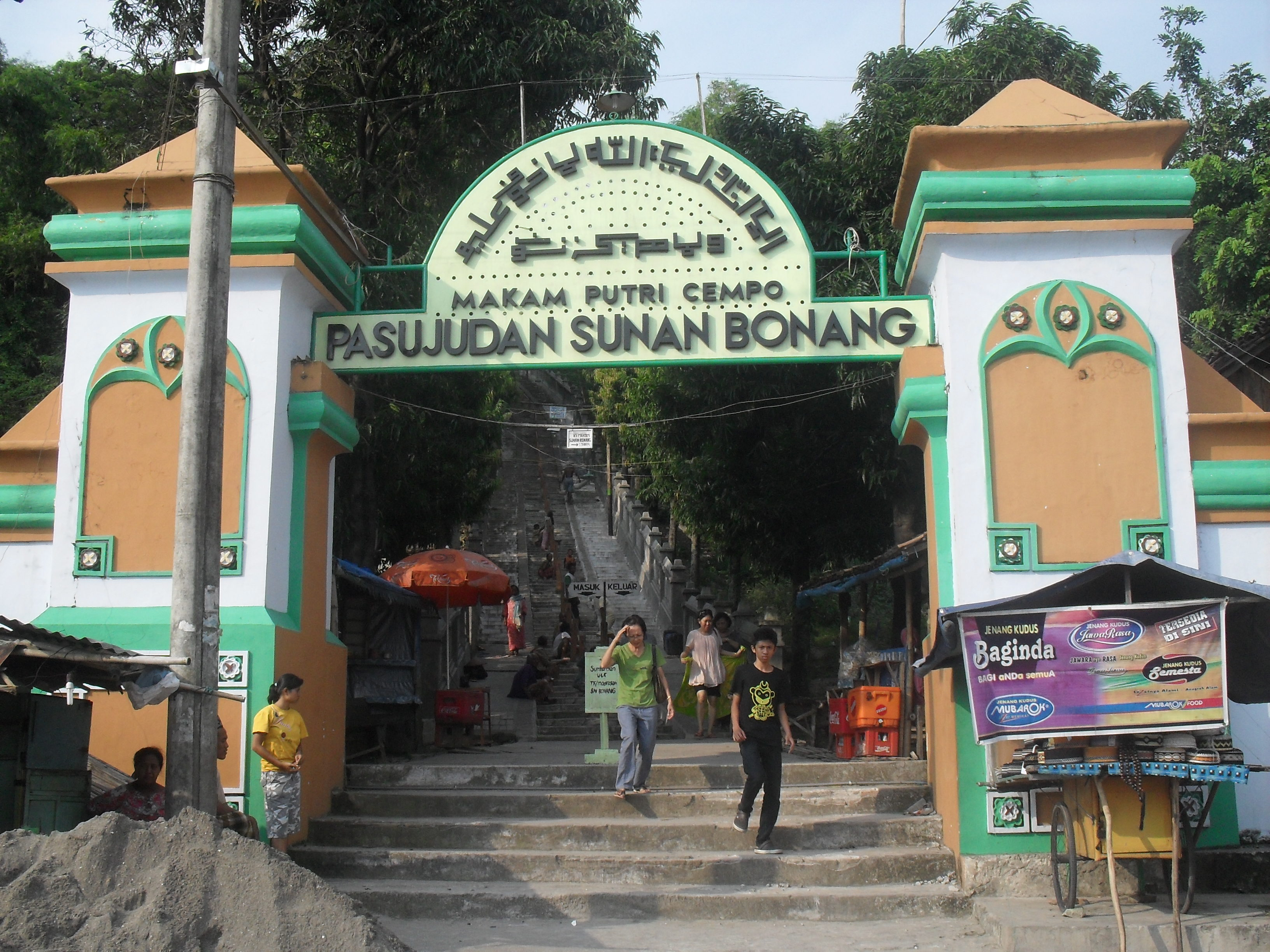
The grave of Sunan Bonang in Tuban is a popular location for ziyarat (saint veneration).

Islam was first introduced in East Java in the 11th century. The earliest evidence of the arrival of Islam in East Java is the existence of Islamic graves on behalf of Fatimah bint Maimun in Gresik in 1082, as well as numbers of Islamic tombs at the complex of Majapahit tomb in Troloyo. The spread of Islam in East Java is largely due to the role of Wali Songo, the legendary Sufi saints, during the 14th century. Five out of nine Wali Songo saints have played decisive roles in the propagation of Islam in East Java, namely Sunan Ampel in Surabaya, Sunan Gresik (Malik Ibrahim) and Sunan Giri in Gresik, Sunan Drajat in Lamongan, and Sunan Bonang in Tuban. Wali Songo were the descendants of Islamic scholars who originated in the Middle East, Central and South Asia; they came down to East Java after generations of proselytization throughout Southeast Asia in areas such as Champa. Malik Ibrahim was the first of the saints who moved across East Java for proselytization after the power of the Majapahit Empire weakened. These saints had certain skills and mercantile interests they could provide to the local populations, such as knowledge about irrigation, while also being able to guide and teach people regarding Islam at the same time. Among the first who converted to Islam were the fishermen in the port. These newly converted Muslims had founded their bases in mosques, such as Ampel Mosque in Surabaya which was completed in 1421, making it among the first mosques built in the archipelago.

The reign of Sultan Agung led to what scholars have called the "mystic synthesis" of Javanese Islam, a fusion of indigenous Javanese traditions with Islam. He often invoked the power of ancient Javanese supernatural themes, sponsored mystical literature, and identified as a Sufi warrior. This cultural synthesis would dominate among the Javanese for over 200 years and influence Javanese society to modern times.

== Society ==
=== Religious outlook ===
Islam in East Java had been traditionally characterized by the preservation of local custom (adat) and the amalgamation of Islamic teaching with the practices of previous religions and indigenous cultures, resulting in the distinct style of Islamic tradition known as kejawen. Muslims who practice these syncretic forms of Islam are called abangan. More recently, kejawen has been relegated to rural pockets following the proliferation of Islamic orthodoxy in the late 20th century. Meanwhile, there has been a formation of Islam Nusantara which is aimed at a pluralist and vernacular interpretation of the orthodoxy.

=== Education ===
Pesantren (or pondok pesantren) is the traditional Islamic seminary originated in East Java, in the form of gender-segregated boarding schools. According to statistics in 2008, as many as 5,025 pesantrens are spread across East Java. Some of the famous pesantrens in East Java are Pondok Modern Darussalam Gontor in Ponorogo, Pondok Pesantren Tebuireng in Jombang, and Pondok Pesantren Lirboyo in Kediri.

Several cities and regions in East Java are known as kota santri or the "city of Muslim students" and the center of Islamic education. Among the well-known kota santri are Gresik, Jombang, Kediri, Pasuruan, Ponorogo, Probolinggo, and Situbondo. The term kota santri is often emphasized by the cities and regions to promote religious tourism.

== Bibliography ==
- Mulder, Niels (2005) [1998]. Mysticism in Java: Ideology in Indonesia. Kanisius. ISBN 9789792111675.
