= Ida Laila =

Indonesian singer (1943–2019)

- Ida Laila (far right) on the Ingin Menerka album of Orkes Melayu Sinar Mutiara Surabaya, 1972

Background information
- Born: Moerahwati binti Abdul Syukur; November 27, 1943; Sidayu, East Java
- Died: September 12, 2019 (aged 75) Madiun, East Java
- Genre: Dangdut. Malay music
- Occupations: Singer and religious preacher
- Years active: 1960–1997

Ida Laila, born Moerahwati (November 27, 1943 – September 12, 2019), was an Indonesian dangdut singer and religious preacher. Ida Laila gained fame in the 1960s and 1970s while performing under various dangdut groups, with hit songs such as "Keagungan Tuhan", composed by Abdul Malik Buzaid, as well as original recordings, such as "Sepiring Berdua".

Throughout her singing career, she released many albums. Her album, Sepiring Berdua, was very successful, earning her the 1987 – 1988 HDX Awards.

Ida Laila left her singing career in favour of becoming a religious preacher around the year 1997–1998. Beginning in 2011, she stopped making public appearances due to her declining health.

She is regarded by several sources to be a veteran dangdut singer. She has been dubbed as a "legendary" singer by Elvy Sukaesih. Ida Laila's songs have been covered by many artists, both modern and contemporary. Ikke Nurjanah has cited Ida Laila as having a strong influence on her music, calling herself a "student of Ida Laila". In 2016, she was given the 2016 Lifetime Achievement Awards for her contributions in the genre of dangdut.

== Career ==
Ida Laila's singing talent began to become visible at the age of 10. As a teenager, she worked with a family living in Ampel who were neighbours of A. Kadir, the head of Orkes Melayu Sinar Kemala. She would recite the Quran each time after her evening prayers, which led to the singer growing fond of her voice, and finally inviting her to rehearsals. Her informal performances under the group gained success, and she later debuted as a permanent singer under Orkes Melayu Sinar Kemala, along with A. Rafiq at the same time. A. Kadir gave her the stage name Ida Laila, consistent with Middle Eastern-style names that were common for contemporary singers of the genre.

She would later join numerous Orkes Melayu groups, including Orkes Melayu Sinar Mutiara, Orkes Melayu Sonata, Orkes Melayu Awara, and Orkes Melayu Antara.

According to CNN Indonesia, Ida Laila's exact discography has not been fully recorded. Ida Laila released five and seven albums with Orkes Melayu Sonata and Orkes Melayu Sinar Mutiara, respectively. She released the most albums under Orkes Melayu Awara, where she released at least 18 albums. She often dueted with S Achmadi under the group, a former singer of Orkes Melayu Sinar Kemala. She often dueted with Mus Mulyadi as well.

Following the 1997 Asian financial crisis, Ida Laila stepped out of the music industry. She pursued deeper religious studies instead, and became a religious preacher. She preached in Islamic forums with the concept of Nada dan Dakwah ('Melodies and Proselytisation'), where she would sing in between sermons.

== Personal life ==
Ida Laila was born in the village of Srowo, Sidayu, Indonesia, on November 27, 1943. Many sources say she was born in Surabaya. Her patronym is written as Abdul Syukur on her gravestone, but many sources claim that her father's name was Sukur. Her mother was named Murji’ah, and she had one younger brother named Usman. She married her husband, Mulyono, in 1963 with whom she had 5 children. One of them died as a small child. Her first son, Agung Murjianto, represented her to claim the 2016 Lifetime Achievement Awards.

Ida Laila could not dance, unlike many singers of her genre.

== Death ==
Ida Laila's health began to deteriorate around 2013 as she began to suffer from diabetes, gout, and hypertension. She had also suffered a stroke, which reduced her mobility and led her to depend on a wheelchair. In March 2018, she was visited by then East Java governor candidate Saifullah Yusuf or better known as Gus Ipul.

She initially lived together with her first-born son in Surabaya, but moved to Madiun 11 months before her death to be treated by her third child. On September 8, 2019, she was transferred from the Madiun Public Hospital to the Dr. Soedono Madiun Hospital after falling into a coma. Ida Laila died on 2:00 AM Western Indonesian Time, September 12, 2019, in the Dr. Soedono Madiun Hospital at the age of 76. In accordance to her will, she was buried in a public cemetery in Rangkah, Surabaya, next to the grave of her fourth child.

Popular artists in the Indonesian music industry such as Elvy Sukaesih, Iis Dahlia, Ikke Nurjanah paid condolences to her following her death. Rhoma Irama, the head of PAMMI (Persatuan Artis Musik Melayu Indonesia), expressed his sorrow over her death, with a member of the organisation's Board of Trustees, Surya Aka Syahnagra, saying that she was "irreplaceable".
