= Sunan Dalem =

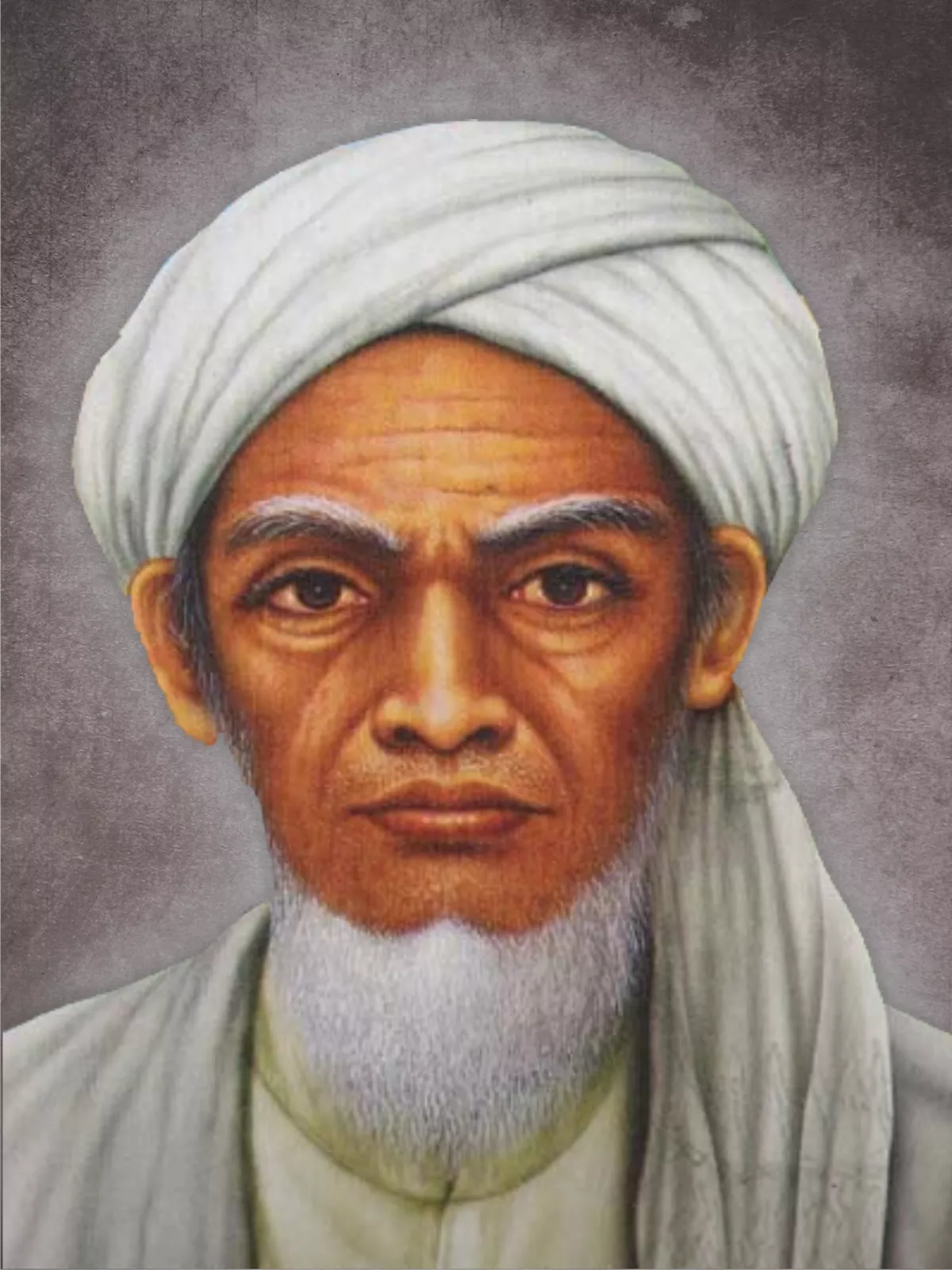

Sunan Dalem, (died 1545) whose real name was Sheikh Maulana Zaenal Abidin, is a Wali propagator of Islam from Gresik, East Java. He has been known as the successor to the second Sultanate of Giri Kedaton since 1506 after his father Sunan Giri (Sheikh Maulana Ainul Yaqin) died. Sunan Dalem's role in the spread of Islam included the construction of a mosque with a three-story roof, which is now called the Tiban Mosque. He died in 1545, but the unique tradition of eating Chicken compote during the 23rd of Ramadan (Sanggiring) inherited from Sunan Dalem is still carried out by the local community now.
