= Sriwati Masmundari =

Indonesian lantern painter (1904–2005)

Sriwati Masmundari (1904–2005), often known simply as Masmundari, was an Indonesian visual artist known for her work with a traditional kind of lantern-painting from her birthplace Gresik called damar kurung. She became famous for it very late in life, having her first public exhibition in 1987; by the 1990s her work was featured by national magazines such as Kompas, in national art exhibitions and in the Indonesian Presidential Palace. Her work, which is sometimes described as folk art or Naïve art, often depicted vibrant scenes of celebrations, families, women at work, and so on.

== Biography ==
Sriwati Masmundari was born in Telogo Pojok village, Gresik Regency, Soerabaja Residency, Dutch East Indies (now located in East Java province, Indonesia) in 1904. She was the eldest of 3 siblings born into a family of artists. She began to paint damar kurung lanterns at age 10, learning from her parents Sinom and Mak Ijah who were also lantern and wayang artists.

She worked for decades in the art form, achieving only local recognition in Gresik. She initially used traditional methods such as painting with food dyes on wax paper; in later years she adopted commercially available and more durable materials such as permanent markers and tracing paper. After creating the lanterns for decades, it was in the 1980s that a local artist from Gresik, Imang AW, convinced a gallery in Jakarta to display her work. That first solo exhibition was in 1987 at the Bentara Budaya Jakarta, a gallery which would regularly display her works in the years to come. In 1989 Kompas magazine featured some of her lantern paintings on the cover of their calendar. She continued to create a prodigious number of lanterns during this time; making as many as 300 per year, which she continued to sell for around 50,000 rupiah; the larger and more ornate ones sold for hundreds of thousands of rupiah.

She continued to create and exhibit art until the last year of her life, growing increasingly contemporary and original in the scenes she depicted. She also worked on canvas in her later years, although she still continued to produce around 30 lanterns per year in the month of Ramadan.

She died on 25 September 2005.

After her death her work continued to be displayed in exhibitions and in books; it appeared at the National Gallery of Indonesia in 2007 as part of an exhibit on Feminism and Indonesian contemporary art, and in a book anthology in the same year.
