= Sunan (Indonesian title) =

Sunan is the shorter version of "Susuhunan", both used as an honorific on the island of Java, Indonesia.

According to Hamka in his book Dari Perbendaharaan Lama, the word is derived from a Javanese word for position (susunan) of hands in reverential salutation, done with hands pressed together, palms touching and fingers pointed upwards, and bowing. This arrangement which has some similarities with Indian "namaste" is called "sembah", which is used to honor and praise. From this "Susuhunan" can mean someone to give the "susunan"/"sembah" to a revered person. Another word for "Susuhunan" is "Sesembahan".

This title is given by the Javanese and Sundanese to rulers, clerics, and even deities. A common usage is for the 'Sunans', or the Nine Saints (Wali Songo), who were the spreaders of Islam in Java. Also, Sunan Ambu (Queen Mother/Goddess Mother) is a female deity revered by the Sundanese.

== Other uses ==
Other missionaries, besides the Wali Songo, have also received the title of Sunan, especially those who were involved in the early spread of Islam in Java. These include:

- Sunan Bangkalan
- Sunan Bungkul
- Sunan Dalem
- Sunan Geseng
- Sunan Ngadilangu
- Sunan Ngerang
- Sunan Ngudung
- Sunan Prawata
- Sunan Sendang Duwur
- Sunan Tembayat
- Sunan Wilis
- Sunan Lawu

== See also ==
- Wali Sanga
