= Damar kurung lantern =

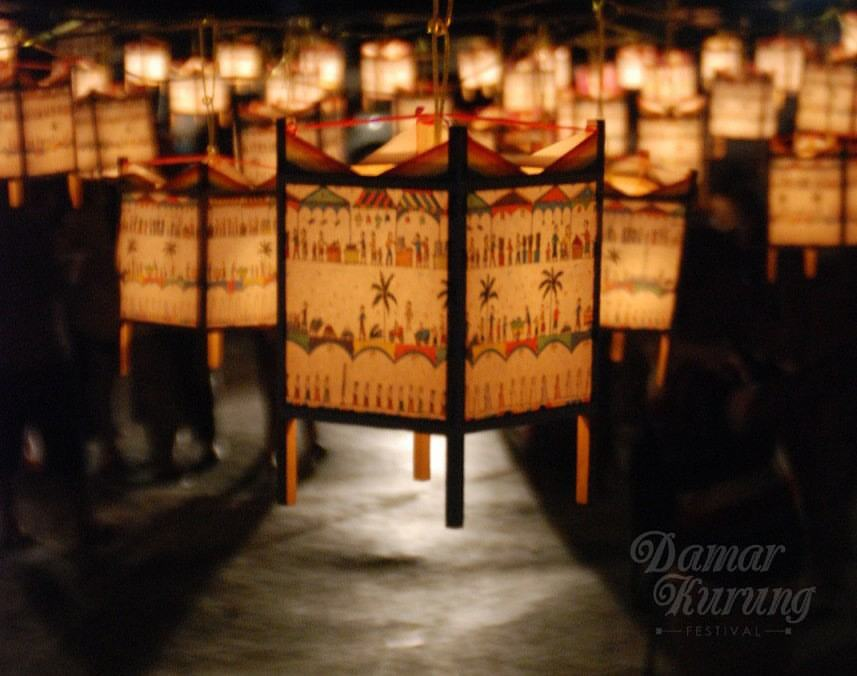
Damar Kurung festival

A Damar Kurung is a lantern with a form derived from Gresik, East Java, Indonesia. Sriwati Masmundari was a prominent Damar Kurung artist.

== History ==
Damar Kurung is a Gresik Muslim tradition to welcome Laylat al-Qadr in the month of Ramadan in the Islamic calendar. As part of the tradition, the lanterns are hung on resin brackets in front of the house.

Initially, the resin brackets were crafted only by the Masmundari family circle, until the Damar Festival in 2012, when several companies began mass production.

== Design ==
Damar lanterns are traditionally cubical with lined paper, featuring a two-dimensional image usually referencing Indonesian culture. Damar Kurung can also be made with fiberglass, so they don't get damaged during rainy season.

Damar lanterns are usually ornamented, that may reflect specific festivals or celebrations. The rules to make Damar Kurung lamps include:

- Each side of a damarkurung must have two or three sequences, top to bottom. All four sides should have the same number of sequences.
- The paintings are two dimensional.
- Outdoor stories are represented by tree pictures.
- Indoor stories are represented by roof pictures.
- Wind directions are represented by arrows.
- Conversations between figures are represented by three dots that are arranged as triangles.
- The allowed colors are green, blue, red and yellow.
- Paints are water colors or acrylics.
- Stories are either sacred or profane.
- The reading of damarkurung stories begins from the sacred, then the damarkurung is turned to the left and read from top to bottom. This is similar to the readable reliefs in temples in East Java.

== Development ==
Damar lanterns include many developments, such as resin brackets made of mica acrylic, painting berfigura, bedside lamps, architectural building-elements and designs on a shirt.

A resin brackets festival began in 2012 aimed at Meningatkan society to restore the tradition. Thousands of resin brackets are typically lit in Gresik and the younger generation are educated in the practice, commonly called Pesantren resin brackets.
