= Moh Limo =

Moh Limo (Javanese: Ma lima) is a moral philosophy and ethical teaching attributed to the 15th-century Javanese saint Sunan Ampel (1401–1481), one of the Wali Songo. The term literally means "refuse to do five things" and represents a set of prohibitions designed to reform the social and moral condition of Java during the decline of the Majapahit Empire. Its enduring influence continues to be discussed in Indonesia as a symbol of ethical conduct and social reform.

== Content ==
The concept of Moh Limo consists of five core prohibitions — principles of avoiding immoral acts and maintaining purity of behavior. These are:

1. Moh Madhat: Literally means “do not get intoxicated.” It forbids the use of substances that cause intoxication, such as opium or other narcotics.
2. Moh Madon: Means “do not engage in adultery.” It instructs people to refrain from sexual relations or inappropriate physical contact with anyone who is not their mahram (lawful spouse or close relative).
3. Moh Main: Means “do not gamble.” The prohibition refers to gambling activities common at the time, such as playing cards or other games of chance involving money.
4. Moh Minum: Means “do not drink.” Here it refers specifically to alcoholic beverages, such as arak and khamr. Unlike Moh Madhat, which refers broadly to intoxicants, Moh Minum targets specific drinks that cause intoxication.
5. Moh Maling: Means “do not steal.” It forbids taking the property of others without right or permission.

== Interpretation and legacy ==
Moh Limo is considered one of Sunan Ampel’s most enduring teachings. It served as a simple yet powerful framework for moral education and community reform in 15th-century Java. Scholars interpret it as a synthesis of Islamic ethics with Javanese cultural wisdom, making it accessible to the local population.

The principle remains influential in modern Indonesia and is often cited by religious and cultural leaders as a moral foundation for building a virtuous society. The Moh Limo philosophy has been compared to later Javanese ethical maxims emphasizing self-control, honesty, and moderation.
