= Sunan =

Sunan may refer to:

- Hadith collections in Islam:
  - Sunan Abi Da'ud
  - Sunan al-Tirmidhi
  - Sunan al-Sughra
  - Sunan Ibn Maja
- Sunan (Indonesian title), honorary title in Java island, Indonesia
- Sunan-guyŏk, a district of Pyongyang, North Korea
  - Pyongyang Sunan International Airport
- Sunan Yugur Autonomous County, in Gansu, China
- Southern Jiangsu province (Sunan in Hanyu Pinyin), in China
  - Wuxi Shuofang Airport in Southern Jiangsu, operated by Sunan Shuofang Airport company
