= Sunan Drajat =

One of nine Islamic saints in Java

Kangjeng Susuhunan Drajat
- Born: Raden Qasim; 1470; Surabaya
- Died: 1522 (aged 51–52); Paciran, Lamongan
- Era: Demak Sultanate
- Organization: Walisongo
- Title: Kangjeng Susuhunan Drajat
- Father: Sunan Ampel

Sunan Drajat was born in 1470 CE. He was one of the Wali Songo or "nine Saints", along with his brother Sunan Bonang and his father Sunan Ampel to whom is attributed the establishment of Islam as the dominant religion amongst the Javanese, Indonesia's largest ethnic group.

He was a descendant of Majapahit nobility in Tuban and a Chinese captain named Gan Eng Cu.

Like his brother, he composed gamelan songs as a means for spreading Islamic teachings on Java. One example was the tune Gending 'Pangkur'.

In 1502 CE, he built the masjid in the village of Jelag in Paciran (north of Surabaya)

== See also ==
- Islam in Indonesia
- The spread of Islam in Indonesia (1200 to 1600)
- Ali al-Uraidhi ibn Ja'far al-Sadiq
- List of Sufi saints
- List of Sufis

== Notes and references ==
- Sunyoto, Agus (2014). Atlas Wali Songo: Buku Pertama yang Mengungkap Wali Songo Sebagai Fakta Sejarah. 6th edition. Depok: Pustaka IIMaN. ISBN 978-602-8648-09-7
