= Sunan Bungkul =

Sunan Bungkul, whose real name is Ki Ageng Supo or Mpu Supo, was a nobleman from the time of the Majapahit Kingdom, who after converting to Islam used the name Ki Ageng Mahmuddin. He was one of the spreaders of Islam in the late 15th century in the Majapahit Kingdom. He is the son-in-law of Sunan Ampel, although some say he is the father-in-law of Raden Paku, who is better known as Sunan Giri. He is estimated to have lived during the Sunan Ampel period of 1400–1481 M. He had a daughter named Dewi Wardah. His tomb is directly behind Taman Bungkul Surabaya.

== Folk tales ==
One of the tales circulating about Sunun Bungkul revolves around marrying off his child but could not find the right man for the marriage. He then organized a contest to find a match. Whoever could pick from the pomegranate tree growing in his garden would wed his daughter, Dewi Wardah. Many men tried but none succeeded in picking a pomegranate from the tree, some even dying in the process. One day, Raden Paku, who is also known as Sunan Giri, walked through Sunan Bungkul's garden. As he arrived at the pomegranate tree, a pomegranate fell from the tree. Raden Paku took it and handed it to Sunan Ampel, his teacher at the pesantren.

Sunan Ampel said to Raden Paku, "Blessed are you, because soon you will be the in-law of Ki Ageng Supo through an arranged marriage with his daughter, Dewi Wardah". Raden Paku responded with confusion as he was supposed to be married to the daughter of Kanjeng Sunan. Raden Paku then explained Ki Ageng Supo's contest and stated that it must be Raden Paku's destiny to have two wives, Dewi Wardah and Dewi Murtosiah.

Another tale tells a different version wherein Ki Ageng Supo accidentally picked a pomegranate and it washed away in the river Kalimas. The pomegranate flowed north until it reached the Ngemplak split, where the river was divided into two. The left branched towards Ujung and the right flowed into the Pegirikan River. The pomegranate floated and drifted towards the right. One morning, a santri of Sunan Ampel found the pomegranate while taking a bath in the river and handed it over to Sunan Ampel. The following day, Ki Ageng Supo traced the riverbanks and located the place where many students were bathing in the river. He was certain that this was where the pomegranate was found by one of his students. When asked if anyone found a pomegranate, Raden Paku confessed he was the one who found it and was subsequently married to Dewi Wardah.
