= Sunan Bonang =

One of nine Islamic saints in Java

Sunang Bonang Sayyid Makdum Ibrahim
- Born: Raden Makdum Ibrahim; 1465; Rembang
- Died: 1525 (aged 59–60); Tuban
- Era: Demak Sultanate
- Organization: Walisongo
- Title: Kangjeng Susuhunan Bonang
- Father: Sunan Ampel

Sunan Bonang (born Raden Makdum Ibrahim) was one of the nine Wali Songo (lit. "Nine Saints"), along with his father Sunan Ampel and his brother Sunan Drajat who are said to have established Islam as the dominant religion amongst the Javanese, Indonesia's largest ethnic group.

He was a descendant of the Majapahit nobility in Tuban and a Chinese captain named Gan Eng Cu. However, another source stated that he was a son of Sunan Ampel and female noble, Nyai Ageng Manila. After becoming a prominent ulama, he tried to make ordinary Javanese familiar with Islam. He is known as teacher of Raden Patah, ruler of Demak Sultanate.

According to the manuscript of Het boek van Bonang, which is also known as Lontar Ferrara, Bep Schrieke has recorded that some views from Sunan Bonang that criticize forms of Bid'ah (Heresy) and favor orthodoxy of Islamic teaching.

== See also ==
- Islam in Indonesia
- Spread of Islam in Indonesia
- Ali al-Uraydi
