= Malik Ibrahim =

Javanese Islamic cleric

Maulana Malik Ibrahim
- مولانا مالك إبراهيم
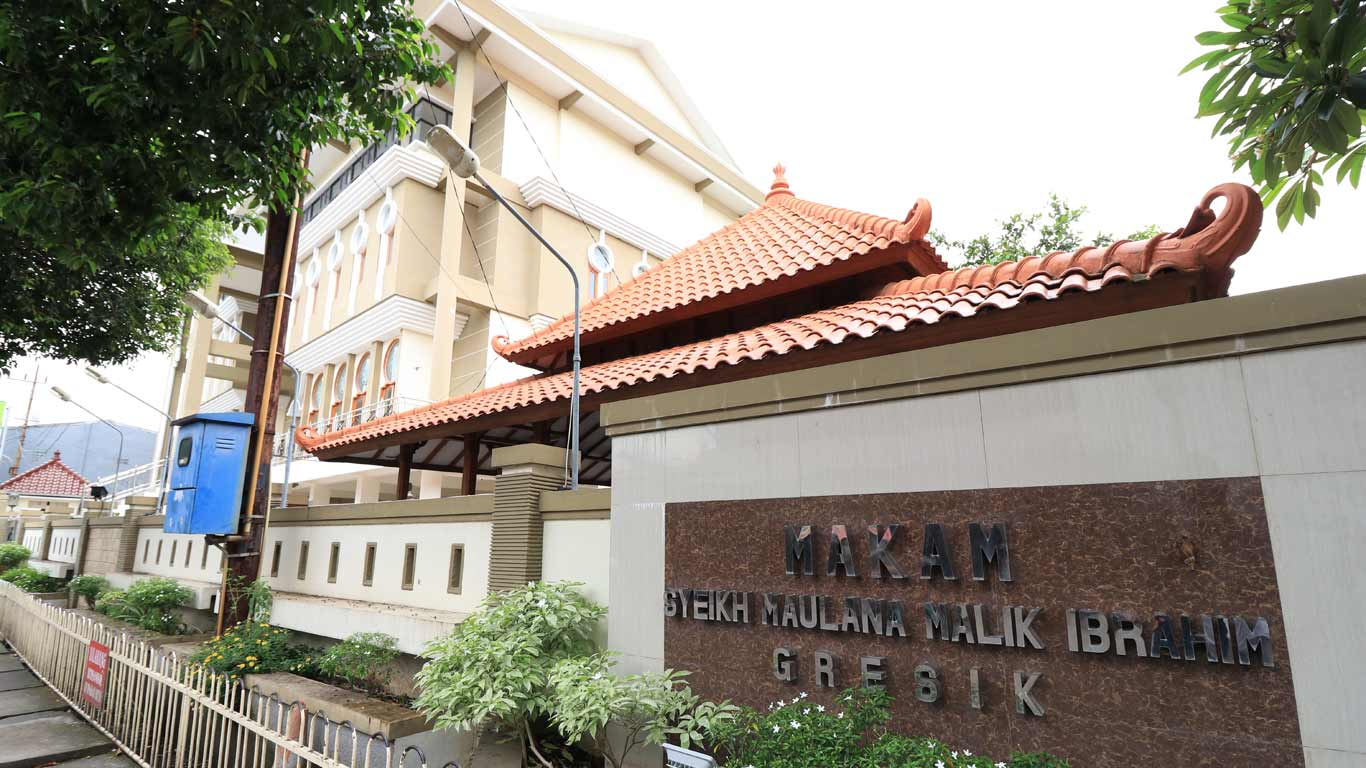
- Mausoleum of Maulana Malik Ibrahim in Gresik

Personal life
- Born: c. 14th century CE Kashan, Persia
- Died: 1419 Gapura, Gresik
- Spouse: Dewi Candrawulan
- Children: Sunan Ampel and Ali Murtadha
- Parent: Syekh Jumadil Qubro (father)

Religious life
- Religion: Islam
- Denomination: Sunni
- Jurisprudence: Shafi'i
- Tariqa: Kubrawiya

Muslim leader
- Disciple of: Mir Sayid Ali Shafi Hamadani

Maulana Malik Ibrahim (مولانا مالك إبراهيم; died 7 April 1419), also known as Sunan Gresik or Kakek Bantal, was the first of the Wali Songo, the nine men generally thought to have introduced Islam to Java.

His habit of placing the Qu'ran on a pillow led to him receiving the nickname Kakek Bantal (lit. Pillow Grandfather).

Before the 19th century, Ibrahim was not considered one of the Wali Songo, the saints who are believed to have spread Islam to Java. After his grave was rediscovered in the early 19th century, he was included in the core group. He was first listed as a Wali Songo in Babad Dipanegara.

== Biography ==
Ibrahim's origin is unclear, although it is generally agreed that he originated from outside of Java. He is thought to have been born in the first half of the 14th century. Ibrahim is known by several names in the Babad Tanah Jawi and other texts. In a transcription by J. J. Meinsma, he is identified as Makhdum Ibrahim as-Samarqandy (localised to Syekh Ibrahim Asmarakandi); this name indicates a possible origin from Samarkand in modern-day Uzbekistan. However, other sources have suggested that Asmarakandi came to Java in the 16th century and is buried in Tuban Regency, making him a different person. Meanwhile, according to Babad Tjerbon, Malik Ibrahim originated from Tyuleny Archipelago, north-eastern Caspian Sea. (Note: Babad Jterbon is a manuscript which written by Jan Laurens Andries Brandes, a dutch Philology expert. This manuscript recorded the origins of Malik Ibrahim from Tyuleni.) The most generally accepted history, supported by a reading by J. P. Moquette of the inscription at Ibrahim's grave, identifies him as having come from Kashan, Persia (modern-day Iran). Dutch writer and researcher Martin van Bruinessen describes Jumadil Kubra, Malik Ibrahim among all their students are followers of Kubrawiyyah . Malik Ibrahim was born in Kashan, Syekh Jumadil Qubro and Malik Ibrahim are disciples of Kubrowi Shafi'i school of Jurist Master Mir Sayid Ali Shafi Hamadani (died 1384), of Hamadan in Persia.

Malik Ibrahim belonged to syed and highly educated family in Kashan, his grand grandfather migrated from Samarkand to Kashan, that is why their family also known as Samarkandi. Ibrahim came to Java with his father, Syekh Jumadil Qubro or Kubro, and his brother Maulana Ishaq, from Persia. According to this version, Qubro stayed in Java while his sons went abroad for dakwah: Ibrahim went to Champa (in modern-day Vietnam), while his brother went to Pasai in northern Sumatra. In his 13 years in Champa, Ibrahim provided healthcare and taught farmers more efficient ways to grow crops. He also married one of the king's daughters, whose name has been Indonesianised as Dewi Candrawulan, and had two sons. Their name are Ali Rahmatullah (later known as Sunan Ampel) and Ali Murtadha. When he felt that he had converted enough people to Islam, Ibrahim returned to Java without his family.

Ibrahim landed at Sembalo, Learn, Manyar (9 kilometres (5.6 mi) north of modern-day Gresik) in the late 14th century, where he became acquainted with the local people. He began trading out of the harbour, dealing equally with people from different castes - social strata based in the dominant Hindu religion. By doing so, Ibrahim found popular support from the lower castes, which led to numerous conversions. He also continued his work from Champa, teaching the locals ways to improve harvests and treating the ill.

Through his trading, Ibrahim became acquainted with the ruling class and nobles. After journeying to Trowulan to meet the king of Majapahit, he was granted a landing on the outskirts of Gresik which was used for preaching; Ibrahim also founded an Islamic boarding school there.

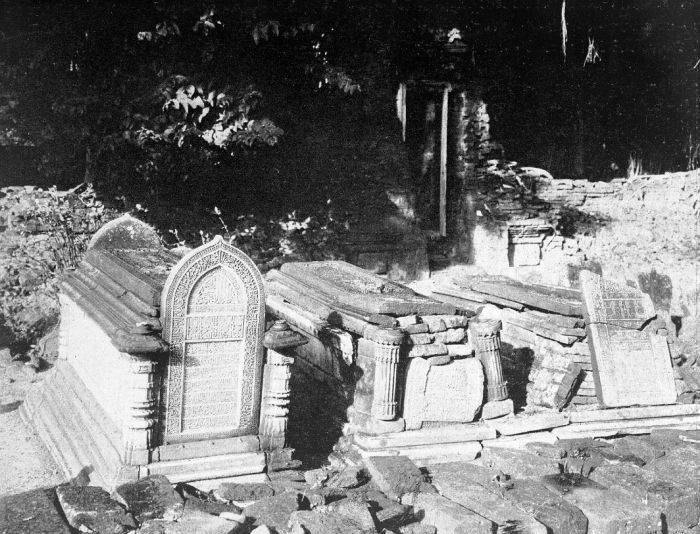
Malik Ibrahim's grave, c. 1900

A legend associated with Ibrahim is that one day, while travelling, he came across a young woman about to be sacrificed to the gods in order to end a long-standing drought. After stopping a group of men from stabbing the woman, Ibrahim prayed for rain; when his prayers were answered, the group he had faced converted to Islam.

Ibrahim died on 12 Rabi' al-Awwal, 822 Hijri (7 April 1419 on the Julian calendar). He was buried in Gapura village, Gresik, East Java.

== Tomb ==
Malik Ibrahim's grave, which is without a headstone, is a common destination for pilgrims, who read the Qu'ran and the life of Muhammad; they also partake in a dish unique to the area, harisah rice porridge. In 2005 over 1.5 million pilgrims went to the grave, for which there is an entry fee. Most come on the anniversary of his death, based on the Islamic calendar.

Near Ibrahim's grave is a stone marker bearing an inscription in Arabic, translated below:

This is the grave of a man who is sure to be forgiven by Allah and be granted happiness by The All-Gracious, the teacher of princes and adviser to sultans and viziers, friend of the poor and destitute. The great religious teacher: Malik Ibrahim, renowned for his goodness. May Allah grant His pleasure and grace, and bring him to heaven. He died on Senin, 12 Rabi' al-Awwal, 822 Hijri.

The grave marker is made of stone from the Khambhat region of India. By comparing the marker with others found in the Pasai Kingdom, historians such as Brian Harrison and G. H. Bousquet have suggested that the spread of Islam in Indonesia originated in India.

== Legacy ==
Both of Ibrahim's sons went on to spread Islam to Java after they became adults. The eldest, Ali Rahmatullah, is better known as Sunan Ampel and is a member of the Wali Songo himself. The youngest was named Ali Murthada. Ibrahim's work in eastern Java was continued by Raden Paku (later known as Susuhunan Giri) in Giri (now part of Jepara Regency of Central Java) and Ali Rahmatullah, whose name is now Raden Rahmat, founded an Islamic school in Ngampel, Surabaya.

Every year, the Gresik city government holds a festival to celebrate Ibrahim's birth. Known as Gebyar Maulid, the festival also serves to promote local culture.
