= Ampel Mosque =

Mosque in Surabaya, East Java, Indonesia

- مسجد امبل ꦩꦱ꧀ꦗꦶꦢ꧀ꦲꦩ꧀ꦥꦺꦭ꧀ Masjid Ampel
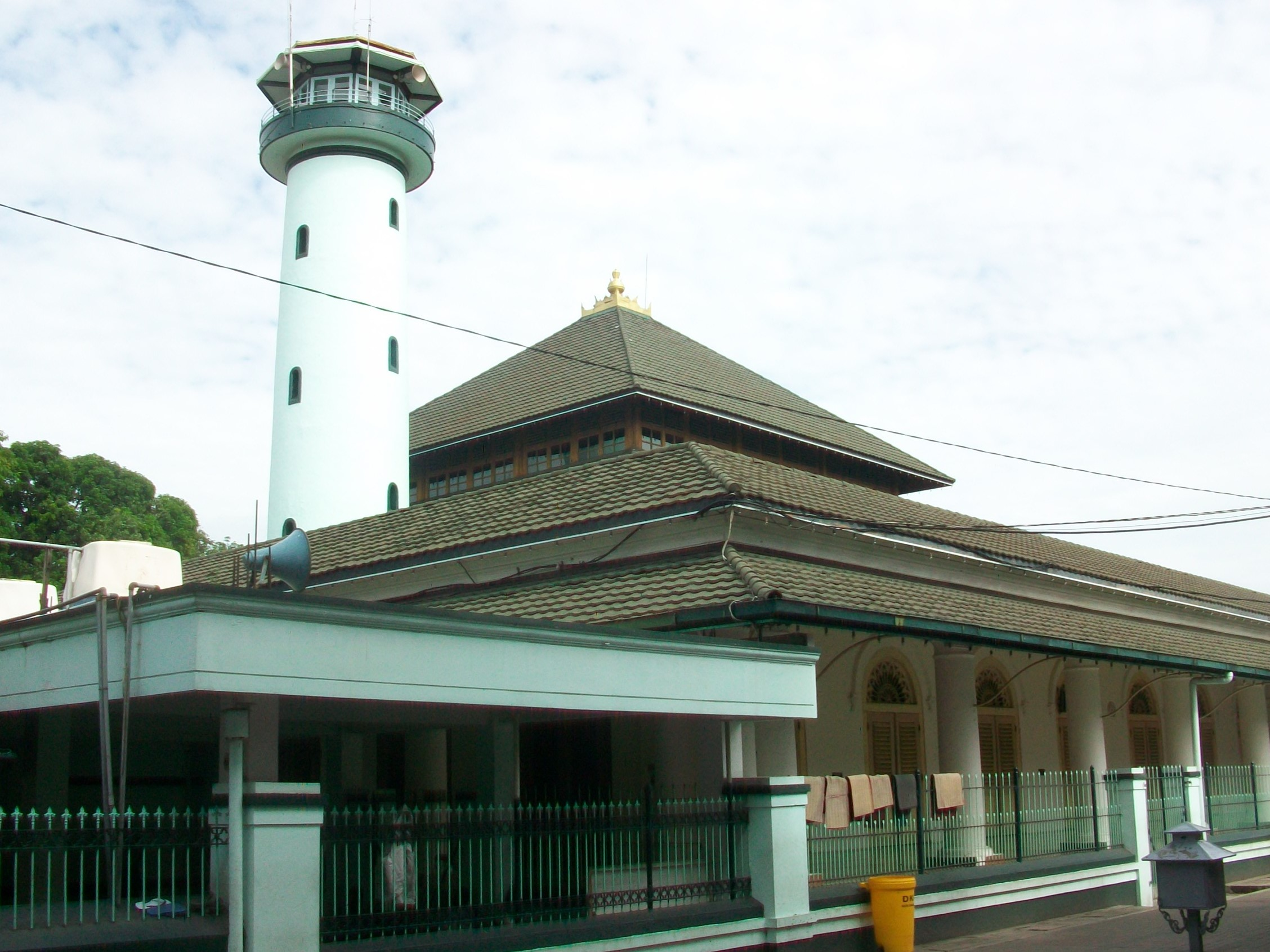
- Ampel Mosque in 2008

- Location of Ampel Mosque in Surabaya Ampel Mosque (Indonesia) Ampel Mosque (Asia) Ampel Mosque (Earth)

Religion
- Affiliation: Islam
- Branch/tradition: Sunni

Location
- Location: Surabaya, Indonesia
- Interactive map of Ampel Mosque
- Administration: City of Surabaya Government
- Coordinates: 7.230306°S 112.742853°E

Architecture
- Type: Mosque
- Style: Indonesia vernacular mosque
- Established: 1421

Specifications
- Length: 180
- Width: 120
- Interior area: 5,000 m^{2} (54,000 sq ft)
- Site area: 21,600 m^{2} (233,000 sq ft)

Ampel Mosque (Indonesian: Masjid Ampel; Arabic: مسجد امبل; Javanese: ꦩꦱ꧀ꦗꦶꦢ꧀ꦲꦩ꧀ꦥꦺꦭ꧀) is an ancient mosque located in the Ampel sub-district, district Semampir, Surabaya, East Java. The oldest mosque in East Java was built in 1421 CE by Sunan Ampel where his tomb complex is located within the area.

== Architecture ==
The mosque, which is currently one of the religious attractions in the city of Surabaya, is surrounded by buildings with Chinese and Arab architecture. In the left side of the mosque, there is a well that is believed to be the auspicious well, typically used by those who believe to strengthen a pledge or oath.

The tomb complex built with a walled courtyard and gateways. The structures led up to the grave of Sunan Ampel. Panataran, dedicated to Siva of the mountain, comprises a sequence of three walled compounds called Jeroan, Jaba Tengah (with the ancillary temple or Perwara) and Jaba (the last and the highest, containing the main shrine).

== Gallery ==
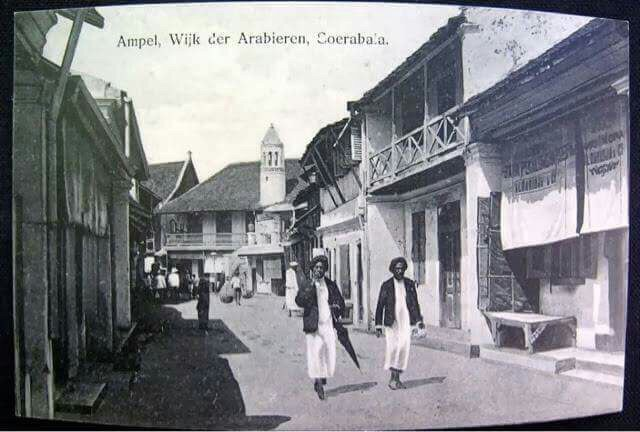
Ampel district in the city of Soerabaya during East-Indies ruling

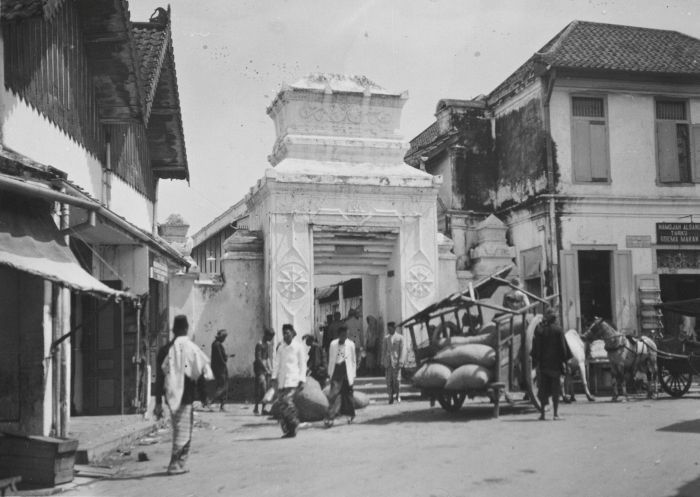

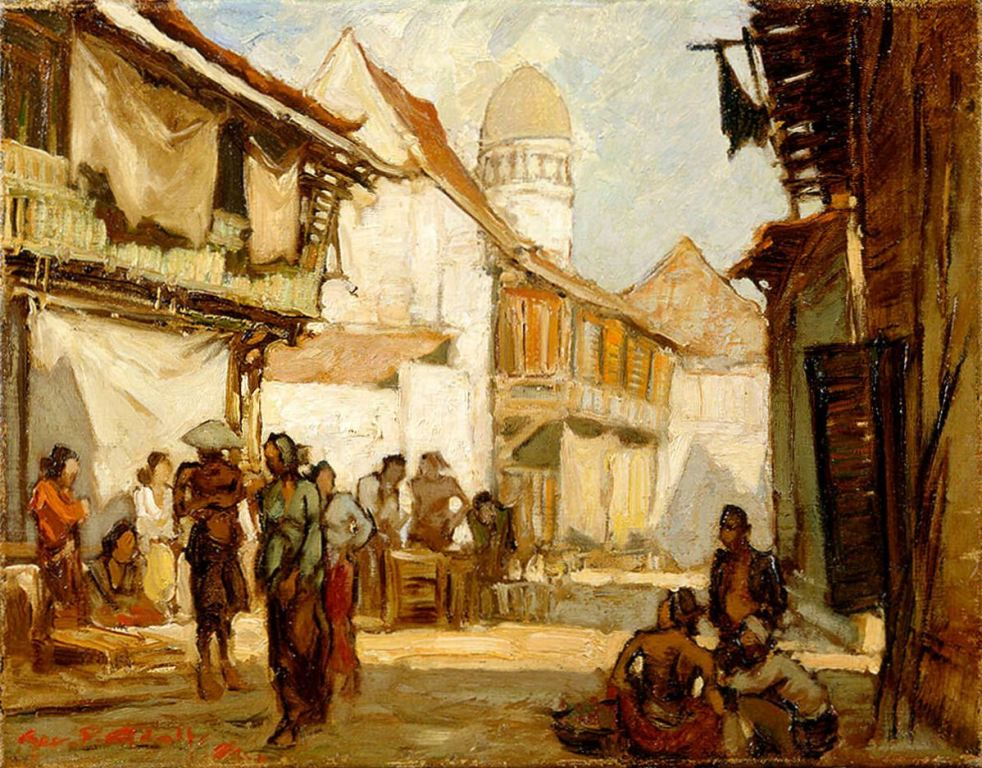

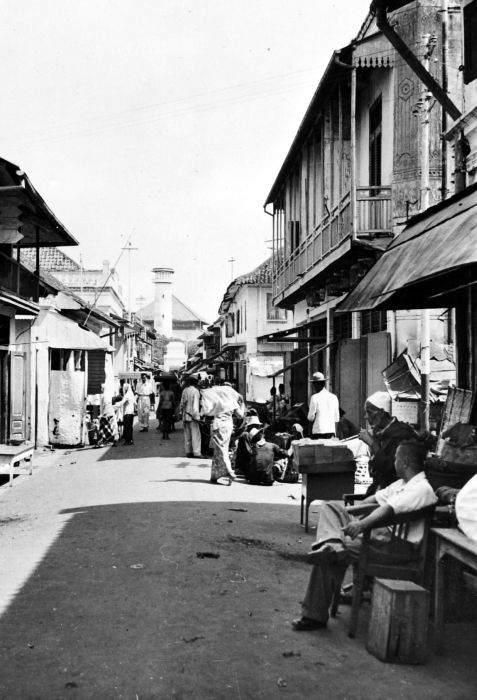

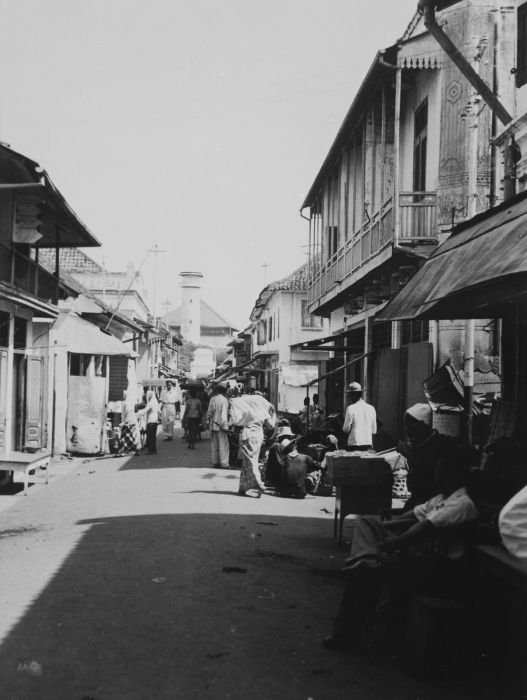

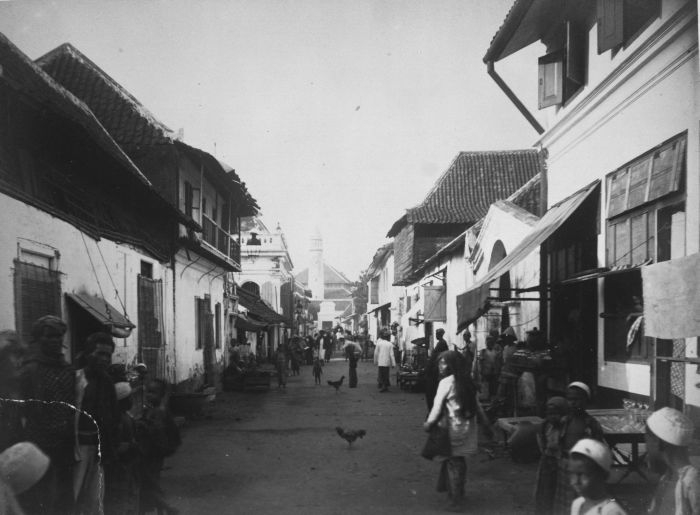

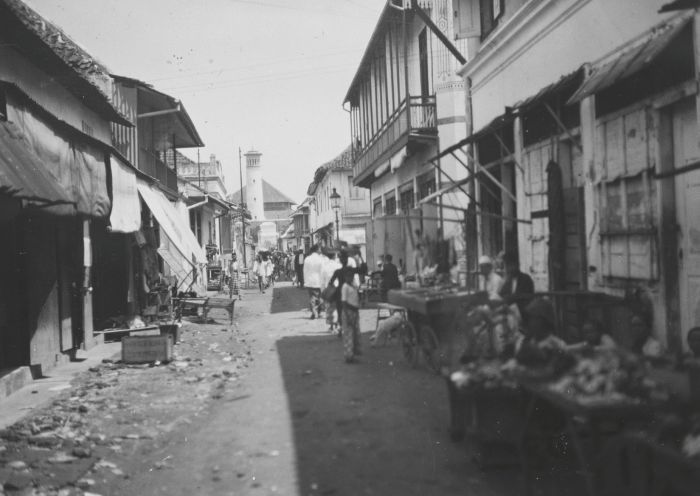

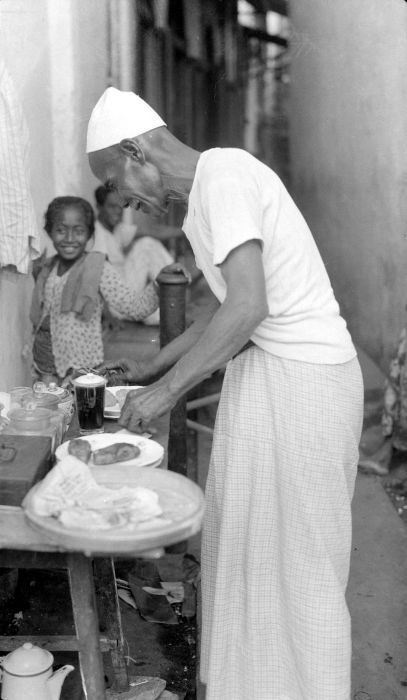

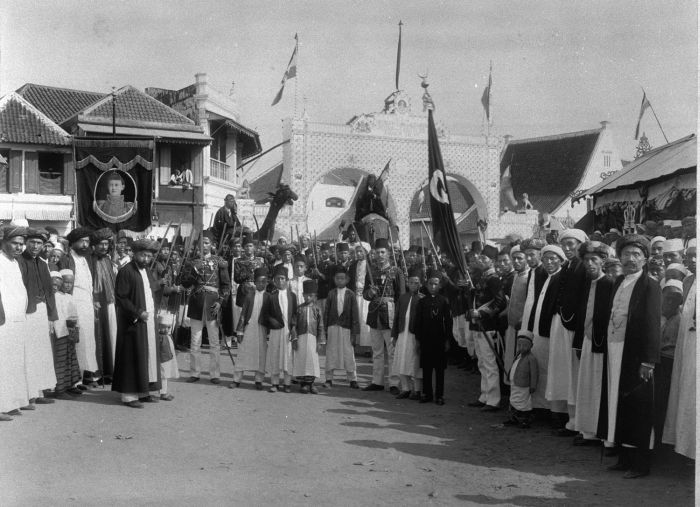

== See also ==
- Islamic architecture
- Islam in Indonesia
- Indonesian architecture
- List of the oldest mosques in the world
