= Sidayu =

- District (kecamatan)
- Interactive map of Sidayu
- Country: Indonesia
- Province: East Java
- Regency: Gresik
- Villages/Sub-districts: 21

Area
  - Total: 47.13 km^{2} (18.20 sq mi)

Population (mid 2024 estimate)
  - Total: 44,542
  - Density: 945.1/km^{2} (2,448/sq mi)

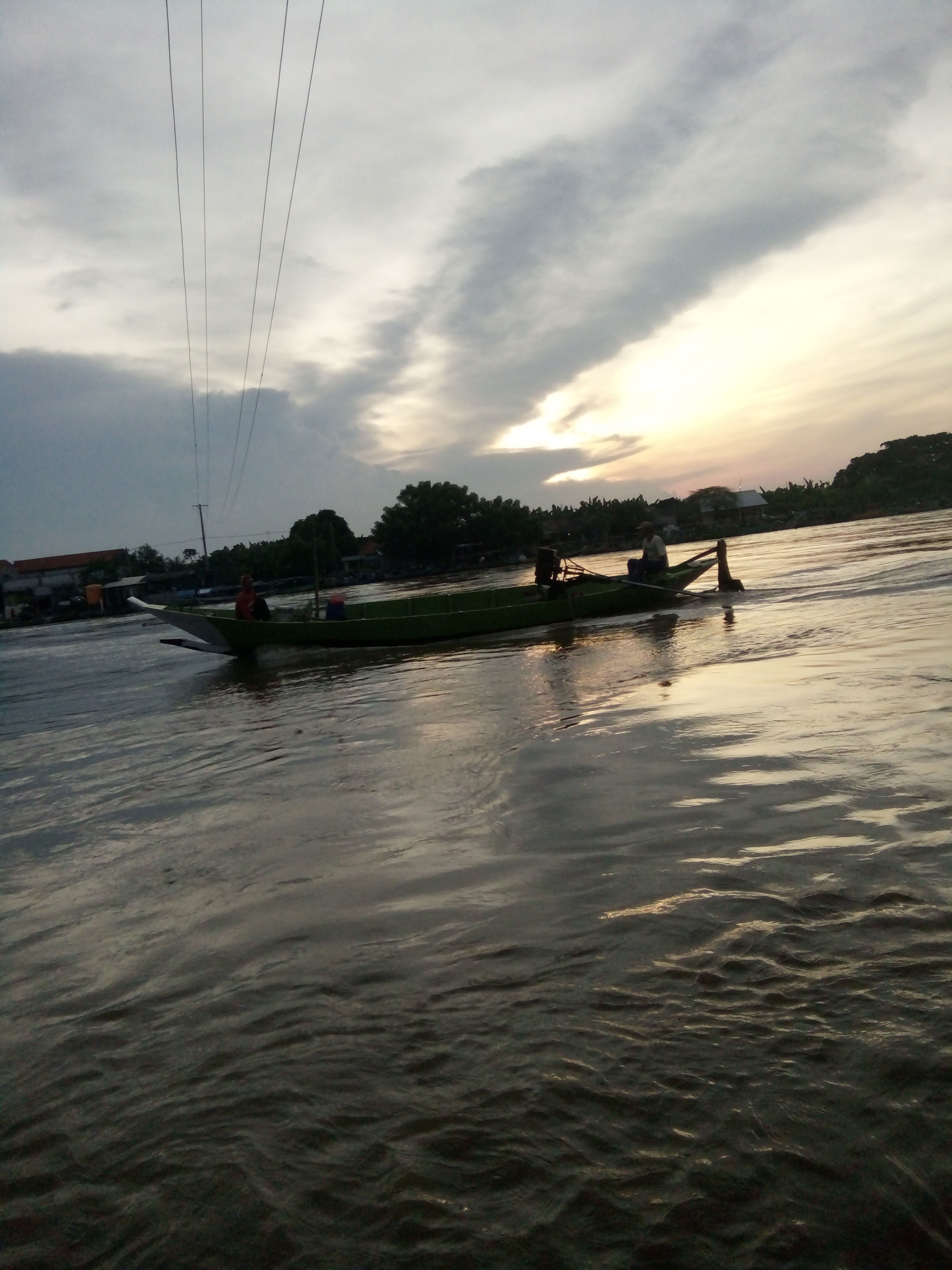

Sidayu is an administrative district (id:kecamatan) in Gresik Regency, part of East Java Province of Indonesia. The district, which is situated to the northwest of the town of Gresik, covers a land area of 47.13 km^{2} and had a population of 44,542 in mid 2024. The district has a long history associated with merchants.
