= Sunan Ampel =

One of nine Islamic saints in Java

Kangjeng Susuhunan Sayyid Ali Rahmatullah Raden Ahmad Rahmatullah
- السيد علي رحمة الله

Personal life
- Born: c. 1401 CE Champa
- Died: 1481 CE Surabaya
- Spouse: Dewi Candrawati; Dewi Karimah
- Children: Sunan Bonang; Sunan Kudus; Syarifah; Dewi Murthasimah (wife of Raden Patah)
- Parent(s): Maulana Malik Ibrahim (Father); Dewi Candrawulan (Mother)
- Notable idea: Moh Limo

Religious life
- Religion: Islam
- Denomination: Sunni

Sunan Ampel (born Raden Ahmad Rahmatullah or Sayyid Ali Rahmatullah; 1401–1481) was one the nine revered Javanese Muslim saints, or Wali Songo, credited with the spread of Islam in Java. According to local history, around Demak the mosque of Demak Masjid Agung Demak was built by Sunan Ampel in 1479 CE, but other sources attributed the construction of the mosque to Sunan Kalijaga.

== Genealogy ==
The father of Sunan Ampel was Maulana Malik Ibrahim, also known as Ibrahim as-Samarkandy ("Ibrahim Asmarakandi" to Javanese pronunciation) and Sunan Gresik. His mother was a princess of Champa. Sunan Ampel was born in Champa, in present-day central Vietnam, in 1401 CE. He came to Java in 1443 CE, possibly to visit his aunt Dwarawati, another Cham princess who was married to Kertawijaya, the king of Majapahit.

A long lineage indicates that Sunan Ampel was a descendant of the Prophet Muhammad. However, another theory claims that Sunan Ampel had Chinese ancestry and identifies him as Bong Swi Hoo. The two theories are not mutually exclusive, because Muslims from China interacted extensively with Southeast Asia during the time of Zheng He. It was also common for a Muslim man to marry a local woman when settling far from his country of origin.

Sunan Ampel married Nyi Gede Manila, the daughter of a Chinese captain at Tuban named Gan Eng Cu. This marriage produced several children: sons Sunan Bonang and Sunan Drajat became wali songo; daughter Syarifah became the wife of Sunan Ngudung and the mother of Sunan Kudus; and another daughter became the first wife of Raden Patah and mother to Trenggana, who succeeded his father as leader of the Sultanate of Demak. Some sources suggest that Raden Patah was the cousin of Sunan Ampel.

== Teachings ==
Moh Limo, Mohlimo or Molimo (Moh: don't want, limo: five) is Sunan Ampel's philosophy of preaching to improve moral decay in society at that time, namely:

1. Moh Mabok : doesn't want to drink alcohol, khamr and the like.
2. Moh Main : doesn't want to play gambling, lottery, betting and the like.
3. Moh Madon : does not want to commit adultery, homosexuality, lesbianism and the like.
4. Moh Madat : doesn't want to use drugs and the like.
5. Moh Maling : does not want to steal, commit corruption, rob and the like.

This teaching emerged during the 15th century when the Majapahit Kingdom was in chaos due to civil war, moral decline, and rampant gambling, robbery, and rape. This situation prompted the Majapahit King, Dyah Kertawijaya, to invite Sunan Ampel to help improve the behavior of the people.

== Burial ==
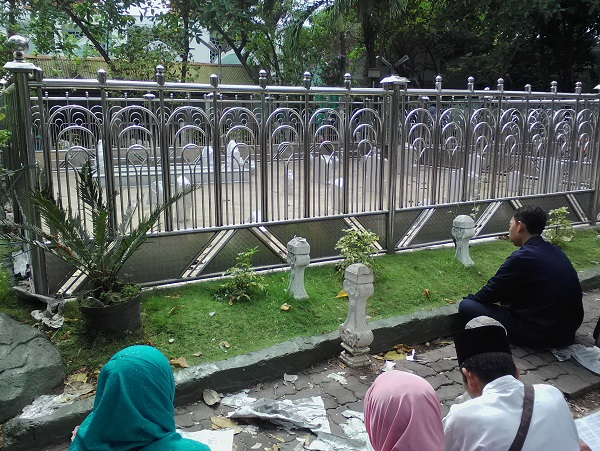
Tomb of Sunan Ampel in Surabaya.

In 1479, Sunan Ampel founded the Great Mosque of Demak. His missionary efforts in the city of Demak were continued by Raden Zainal Abidin, known as Sunan Demak, who was his son by his wife Dewi Karimah.

The youngest son of Raden Zainal Abidin later became the imam of the Great Mosque, and was known as Raden Zakaria (Prince Sotopuro).

Sunan Ampel died in 1481. He was buried in Surabaya, East Java. His tomb is located within the Ampel Mosque complex.

== Activities ==
Sunan Ampel was teacher of Sunan Giri and Raden Patah.

== See also ==
- Islam in Indonesia
- The spread of Islam in Indonesia (1200 to 1600)
- Ali al-Uraidhi ibn Ja'far al-Sadiq

== Notes ==
- Sunyoto, Agus (2014). Atlas Wali Songo: Buku Pertama yang Mengungkap Wali Songo Sebagai Fakta Sejarah. 6th edition. Depok: Pustaka IIMaN. ISBN 978-602-8648-09-7
