= Wali Sanga =

Islamic revered saints in Java

Wali Sanga (Javanese: ꦮꦭꦶꦱꦔ, lit. 'Nine Walis'), also transcribed as Wali Songo, are a group of nine da'is (Islamic missionary) that contributed to the spread of Islam in Indonesia, especially on the island of Java. The word wali sanga is derived from the Arabic word wali, which is used to refer to Muslim saints, and the Javanese word sanga, meaning the number nine.

Although referred to as a group, there is good evidence that fewer than nine were alive in the same time period. Also, some sources use the term "Wali Sanga" to refer to saintly mystic(s) other than the most well-known nine individuals. Each man is often attributed the title sunan in Javanese, which may derive from susuhunan, in this context meaning "honoured". Most of the wali were also called raden during their lifetimes, because they were members of royal houses.

The graves of the Wali Sanga are venerated as locations of ziarah (ziyarat) or local pilgrimage in Java. The graves are also known as pundhen in Javanese.

== Origins ==
The earliest Wali Sanga was Malik Ibrahim. He is thought to have lived in the first half of the 14th century, according to "Babad Tanah Jawi" and other texts. In a transcription by J. J. Meinsma, he is identified as Makhdum Ibrahim as-Samarqandi. The most generally accepted history, supported by a reading by J. P. Mosquette of the inscription at Ibrahim's grave, identifies his origin as Kashan, modern-day Iran. Syekh Jumadil Kubra and Malik Ibrahim were disciples of the Kubrowi Shafi'i school, whose jurist was Mir Syed Ali Hamadani Shafi'i (died 1384) of Hamedan, Iran.

According to Dr Alexander Wain, new research of their association with Gresik suggests the Hamadani penetrated Java between the 14th and mid-16th centuries and also explains Kubrawi Hamadani influence widespread in north India and South China and after entered Java, and wain impression that Kubra-Hamadani are founder of Islam in Java. Malik Ibrahim belonged to a highly educated family in Kashan. His great-grandfather migrated from Samarqand.

According to Martin van Bruinessen, author of the history of Islamic Java: the Syekh Jumadil Kubra, to whom all the saints of Java appear to be related with. It appears to bear a name that is almost certainly a corruption of Najmuddin al-Kubra, has attached itself to various legendary and mythical personalities, who have a common thought that they are the ancestors or preceptors of the founders of Islam in Java – an oblique acknowledgement, perhaps, of the prestige of the Qubrowi in the period of Islamisation.

Tracing the lineage earlier than Malik Ibrahim is problematic. However, some scholars believe that his lineages are of Chinese descent and not Arab. Although his silsila are listed in various Javanese royal chronicles (such as Sejarah Banten) to denote ancestral lineage from erstwhile Hindu kings, the term in Sufism refers to a lineage of teachers. Some of these spiritual lineages are cited by van Bruinessen in his study of the Banten Sultanate, particularly in regard to Sunan Gunung Jati, who was an initiate of various Sufi orders.

Although popular belief sometimes refers to the Wali Sanga as "founders" of Islam on Java, the religion was present by the time the Chinese Muslim admiral Zheng He arrived during the first of his Ming treasure voyages in 1405–1407 CE. Many of the earliest Wali Sanga had Chinese ancestry both paternally and maternally; for example, Sunan Ampel (Chinese name Bong Swi Ho), Sunan Bonang (Ampel's son, Bong Ang), and Sunan Kalijaga (Gan Si Cang). The theory of Chinese maternal ancestry of Wali Sanga was publicized for the very first time in the book entitled "The Collapse of Javanese Hindu Kingdom" (1968), which states that the Wali Sanga are descendants of Chinese Muslims.

Dewi Candrawulan, a Muslim Princess from Champa, was the mother of Raden Rahmat (Prince Rahmat), who was later known by the name of Sunan Ampel. Sunan Ampel was the son of Malik Ibrahim and the ancestor or teacher of some of the other Wali Sanga.

== Synopsis ==
The composition of the nine saints varies depending on different sources. The following list is widely accepted, but its authenticity relies much on repeated citations of a handful of early sources, reinforced as "facts" in school textbooks and other modern accounts. This list differs somewhat from the names suggested in the Babad Tanah Jawi manuscripts.

One theory about the variation of composition is: "The most probable explanation is that there was a loose council of nine religious leaders, and that as older members retired or died, new members were brought into this council". However, it should be borne in mind that the term "Wali Sanga" was created retroactively by historians, and so there was no official "group of nine" that had membership. Further, the differences in the chronology of the wali suggest that there might never have been a time when nine of them were alive contemporaneously.

At first, it was not easy for Islam to enter and thrive in the archipelago. Even in the historical record, in a span of about 800 years, Islam had not been able to establish a substantial presence. Notes from the time of the Tang dynasty of China indicated that merchants from the Middle East had come to the kingdom of Shih-li-fo-shi (Srivijaya) in Sumatra, and Holing (Kalingga) in Java in the year 674 AD, (i.e. in the transitional period of Caliph Ali to Mu'awiya). In the 10th century, a group of Persians called the Lor tribes came to Java. They lived in an area in Ngudung (Kudus), also known as Loram (from the word "Lor" which means North). They also formed other communities in other areas, such as in Gresik. The existence of the Fatimah binti Maimun bin Hibatallah gravestone in Gresik, dated to the 10th century AD, is considered evidence of the incoming migration of the Persian tribes.

In his notes, Marco Polo relates that when returning from China to Italy in 1292, he did not travel via the Silk Road, but instead traveled by sea towards the Persian Gulf. He stopped in Perlak, a port city in Aceh. According to Polo, in Perlak there were three groups, namely (1) ethnic Chinese, who were all Muslims; (2) Western (Persians), also entirely Muslim; and (3) indigenous people in the hinterland, who worshipped trees, rocks, and spirits. In his testimony, he said regarding the "Kingdom of Ferlec (Perlak)" – "This kingdom, you must know, is so much frequented by the Saracen merchants that they have converted the natives to the Law of Mohammet — I mean the townspeople only, for the Java hill-people live for all the world like beasts, and eat human flesh, as well as all other kinds of flesh, clean or unclean. And they worship this, that, and the other thing; for in fact the first thing that they see on rising in the morning, that they do worship for the rest of the day.

One hundred years after Polo, the Chinese Muslim Admiral Zheng He came to Java in 1405. When he stopped in Tuban, he noted that there were 1,000 Chinese Muslim families there. In Gresik, he also found there were 1,000 Chinese Muslim families, with the same amount reported in Surabaya. On Zheng He's seventh (and last) visit to Java in 1433, he invited his scribe named Ma Huan. According to Ma Huan, the Chinese and the Arab population of the cities on the northern beaches of Java were all Muslim, while the indigenous population were mostly non-Muslim animists.

Multiple sources and conventional wisdom agree that the Wali Sanga contributed to the propagation of Islam (but not its original introduction) in the area now known as Indonesia. However, it is difficult to prove the extent of their influence in quantitative terms, such as an increase in the number of adherents or masjids in the areas of their work in contrast to localities where they were not active.

== Members ==
Some of the family relationships described below are well-documented; others are less certain. Even today, it is common in Java for a family friend to be called "uncle" or "brother" despite the lack of blood relationship.

- Sunan Gresik: Arrived on Java 1404 CE, died in 1419 CE, buried in Gresik, East Java. Activities included commerce, healing, and improvement of agricultural techniques. Father of Sunan Ampel and uncle of Sunan Giri.
- Sunan Ampel: Born in Champa in 1401 CE, died in 1481 CE in Demak, Central Java. Can be considered a focal point of the Wali Sanga: he was the son of Sunan Gresik and the father of Sunan Bonang and Sunan Dradjat. Sunan Ampel was also the cousin and father-in-law of Sunan Giri. In addition, Sunan Ampel was the grandfather of Sunan Kudus. Sunan Bonang, in turn, taught Sunan Kalijaga, who was the father of Sunan Muria. Sunan Ampel was also the teacher of Raden Patah.
- Sunan Giri: Born in Blambangan (now Banyuwangi, the easternmost part of Java) in 1442 CE. His father Maulana Ishak, was the brother of Maulana Malik Ibrahim. Sunan Giri's grave is in Gresik near Surabaya.
- Sunan Bonang: Born in 1465 CE in Rembang (near Tuban) on the north coast of Central Java. Died in 1525 CE and was buried in Tuban. Brother of Sunan Drajat. Composed songs for gamelan orchestra.
- Sunan Drajat: Born in 1470 CE. Brother of Sunan Bonang. Composed songs for gamelan orchestra.
- Sunan Kudus: Died 1550 CE, buried in Kudus. Possible originator of wayang golek puppetry.
- Sunan Kalijaga: His born name is Raden Mas Said, and he is the son of Adipati Tuban, Tumenggung Harya Wilatikta. Buried in Kadilangu, Demak. Used wayang kulit shadow puppets and gamelan music to convey spiritual teachings.
- Sunan Muria: Buried in Gunung Muria, Kudus. Son of Sunan Kalijaga and Dewi Soejinah (sister of Sunan Giri), thus grandson of Maulana Ishak.
- Sunan Gunung Jati: Buried in Cirebon. Founder and first ruler of the Cirebon Sultanate. His son, Maulana Hasanudin, became the founding Sultan of Banten.

=== Additional Wali Sanga ===
- Syekh Jumadil Kubro (father of Malik Ibrahim and Maulana Ishak)
- Sunan Sitijenar (mentioned in the Babad Tanah Jawi)
- Sunan Walilanang (mentioned in the Babad Tanah Jawi)
- Sunan Bayat (mentioned in Babad Tanah Jawi)
- Sunan Ngudung (son-in-law of Sunan Ampel and father of Sunan Kudus)

== Prominent Descendants of the Wali Sanga ==
1. KH. Muhammad Hasyim Asy'ari is a direct descendant of the Wali Songo, namely through the lineage of Sunan Giri (Raden Paku or Maulana Ainul Yaqin). Furthermore, his lineage is also connected to the King of Majapahit (Brawijaya) and Jaka Tingkir, and continues to the Prophet Muhammad.
2. KH. Ahmad Dahlan is the 12th descendant of Maulana Malik Ibrahim (Sunan Gresik), one of the Wali Songo who pioneered the spread of Islam in Java. This lineage traces back to his father, K.H. Abu Bakar.
3. Abdurrahman Wahid is the son of KH Wahid Hasyim and grandson of KH Hasyim Asy'ari (Founder of Nahdlatul Ulama).
4. Habib Luthfi Bin Yahya has a sanad (chain of kinship) and lineage (zuriyah) with the Wali Songo. Both Wali Songo and Habib Luthfi are descendants of the Prophet Muhammad (peace be upon him) (from Sayyidah Fatimah RA) and are members of the Ba'alawi clan and the Al-Adzmatkhan family.
5. Ganjar Pranowo is said to be a descendant of Sunan Kalijaga through his father's lineage.
6. R.A. Mangkarawati is said to be a descendant of Sunan Ampel. Academic research also confirms this relationship.
7. Prince Diponegoro is indeed a descendant of the Wali Songo, specifically through his mother and ancestors.
8. KH Ma'ruf Amin has a lineage connected to the Wali Songo, specifically Sunan Gunung Jati (Maulana Syarif Hidayatullah).
9. Sammy Fadhilan claims a lineage connected to the history of the Sultanate and Javanese figures such as Sunan Ampel and Brawijaya V. This lineage claim is part of the family history of Princess Campa, the concubine of King Brawijaya V.
10. Tantri Kotak is still a descendant of Sunan Gunung Jati. She also said that her paternal great-grandfather and grandmother were buried in the Gunung Jati area.

== See also ==
- Azmatkhan
- Islam in Indonesia
- Seven Saints of Marrakesh
- List of Sufi saints

== Bibliography ==
- Akbar, Ummu (2009). Kisah Seru 9 Pejuang Islam [The Interesting Stories of 9 Promoters of Islam] (in Indonesian). Bandung: Mizan. ISBN 978-979-752-988-8.
- Sulistiono (2009). Mengenal Jejak Langkah Walisongo [Following the Footsteps of the Walisongo] (in Indonesian). Semarang: Magenta.
- Sunyoto, Agus (2014). Atlas Wali Songo: Buku Pertama yang Mengungkap Wali Songo Sebagai Fakta Sejarah. 6th edition. Depok: Pustaka IIMaN. ISBN 978-602-8648-09-7
