= Sunan Giri =

One of nine Islamic saints in Java

Kangjeng Susuhunan Giri
- ꦫꦝꦺꦤ꧀ꦥꦏꦸ
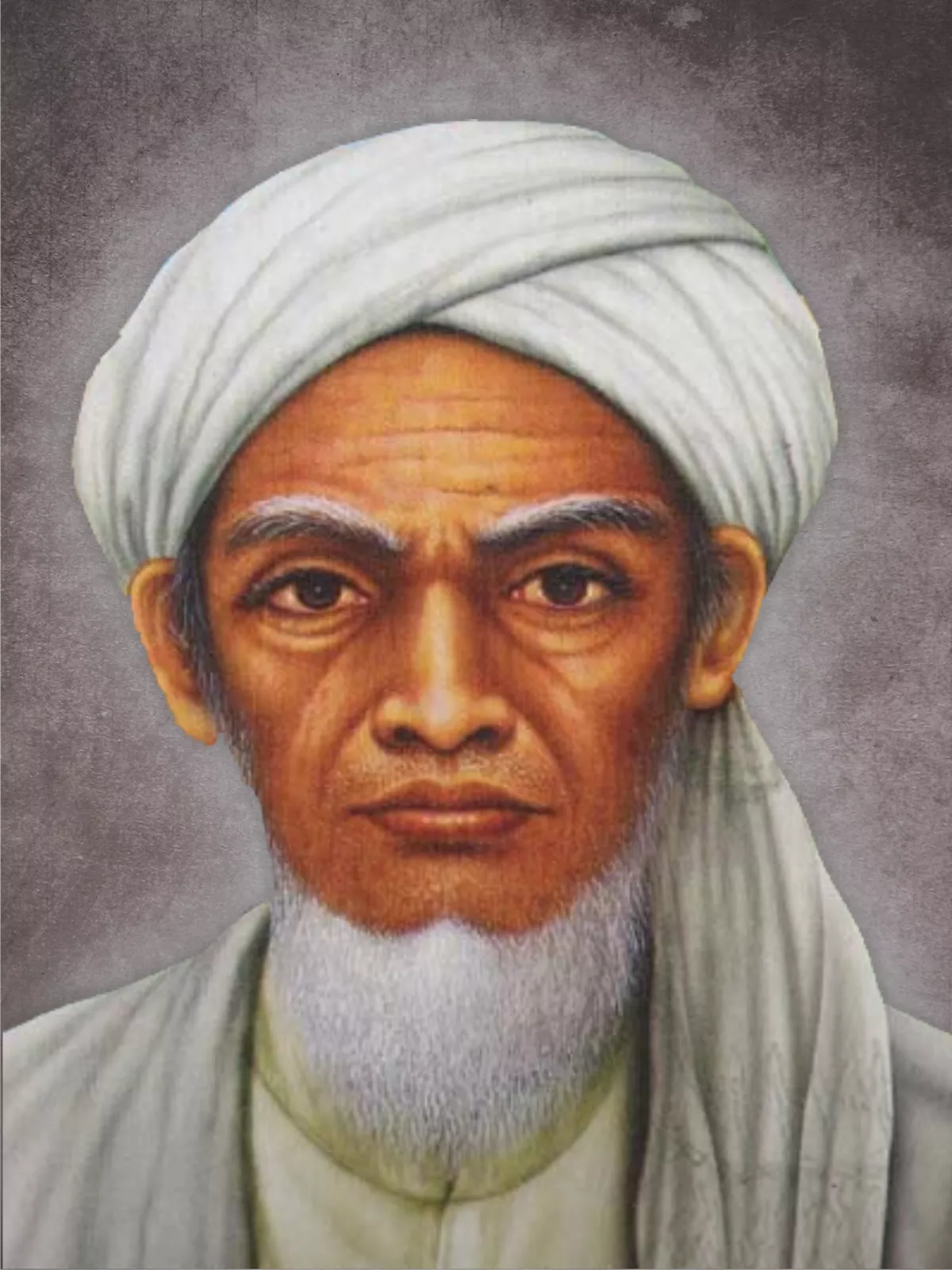
- Sunan Giri painting
- Born: Raden Paku; 1442 CE; Blambangan
- Died: 1506 CE; Kebomas, Gresik
- Other names: Muhammad Ainul Yakin; Joko Samudro
- Era: Majapahit, Demak Sultanate, Cirebon Sultanate
- Organization: Walisongo
- Title: Kangjeng Susuhunan Giri
- Father: Maulana Ishak

Sunan Giri (also called Raden Paku or Joko Samudro), and Muhammad Ainul Yakin (born 1442 CE in Blambangan, which is now Banyuwangi) is considered one of the Wali Sanga (revered saints of Islam) in Indonesia.

== History ==
He was the son of Dewi Sekardadu and Maulana Ishak of Melaka (brother of Maulana Malik Ibrahim) and later adopted as a son by Nyai Gede Pinatih, a female merchant. A traditional story says that he was the son of a Hindu princess who had come to Blambangan as a missionary, who was forced to abandon him in a crisis by setting him adrift on the ocean in a small boat from which he was rescued by sailors—a story reminiscent of the biblical Moses. (see Sejarah Banten).

== Education and contributions ==
As a young man, Giri studied in the school of Sunan Ampel, whose daughter he eventually married, and where Raden Patah was his fellow student.

He later established his school in Sidomukti Village at Southern Gresik in East Java, where he got his name ("Giri" means "hill"). The Islamic school he established was not only an institute of religious studies but a center for local civic activities and social development.

== Political leadership ==
The king of Majapahit granted Giri the authority to expand his role in political leadership, which later on led to the greater development of the school, popularly known as Giri Kedaton. Sunan Giri was also known as Prabu Satmata, due to his remarkable record.

Sunan Giri foretold the rise of Mataram, and spread Islam to Lombok, Sulawesi, and Maluku. He was a proponent of orthodox Islam and disapproved of innovation (much like "modernist" Islamic scholars of the 1800s and 1900s).

== Later history of the Giri Kedaton school ==
Giri Kedaton, as a center of religious and political authority led by century head Pangeran Singosari was known for his most persistent resistance to the Dutch VOC and to Amangkurat II, who collaborated with the Dutch colonization efforts.

The creation of popular Javanese traditional games and children's toys and games such as Jelungan, Jamuran, lir-ilir, and Cublak Suweng is attributed to Sunan Giri. His name is also associated with Gending Asmaradana and Pucung (Javanese poetry)—although they had been mostly influenced by pre-Islamic Javanese beliefs and traditions, but show signs of eventual Islamization.

== See also ==
- Islam in Indonesia
- The spread of Islam in Indonesia (1200 to 1600)
- Ali al-Uraidhi ibn Ja'far al-Sadiq
