= Ampel =

Ampel Kelurahan Ampel
- Town
- Motto: Ampel Madani
- Interactive map of Ampel
- Location within Indonesia
- Coordinates: 7.229556°S 112.742591°E
- Province: Indonesia
- Province: East Java
- Regency: Surabaya
- district: Semampir
- Established: 1421 CE
- Founder: Raden Rahmat
- Time zone: WIB (UTC+7)
- Postal Code: 60151
- Area code: 031
- Website: Ampel Madani

Ampel is a town and an urban kelurahan in the Semampir District (kecamatan) of Surabaya City, East Java, Indonesia. The town is known for its historic Ampel Mosque, and more than 98% of its population are Muslim, with many of them being Yemeni Arabs in Indonesia originating from Hadhramaut.

This East Java town is not to be confused with the town and district of the same name in the Ampel District of Boyolali Regency in Central Java province; the Central Java district originally formed a Regency of its own name, prior to being merged into Boyolali.

== Gallery ==
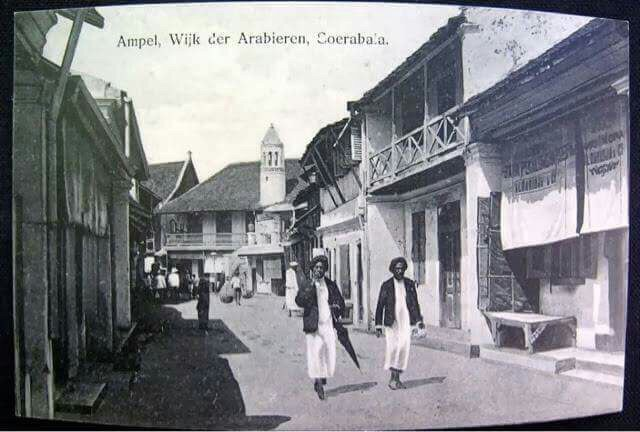
Ampel district in the city of Soerabaya during East-Indies ruling

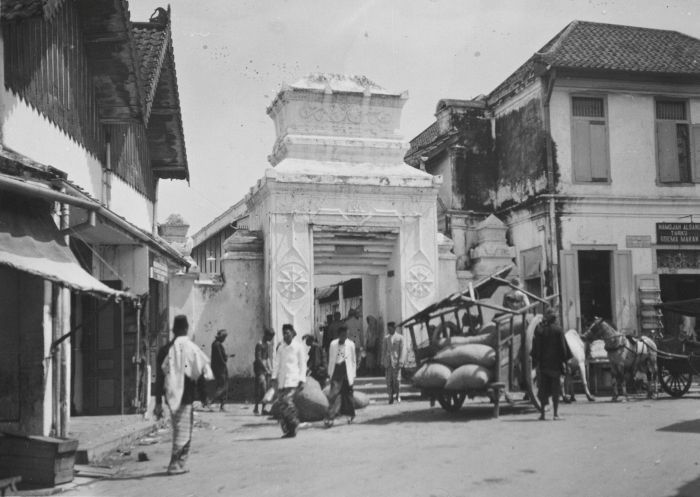

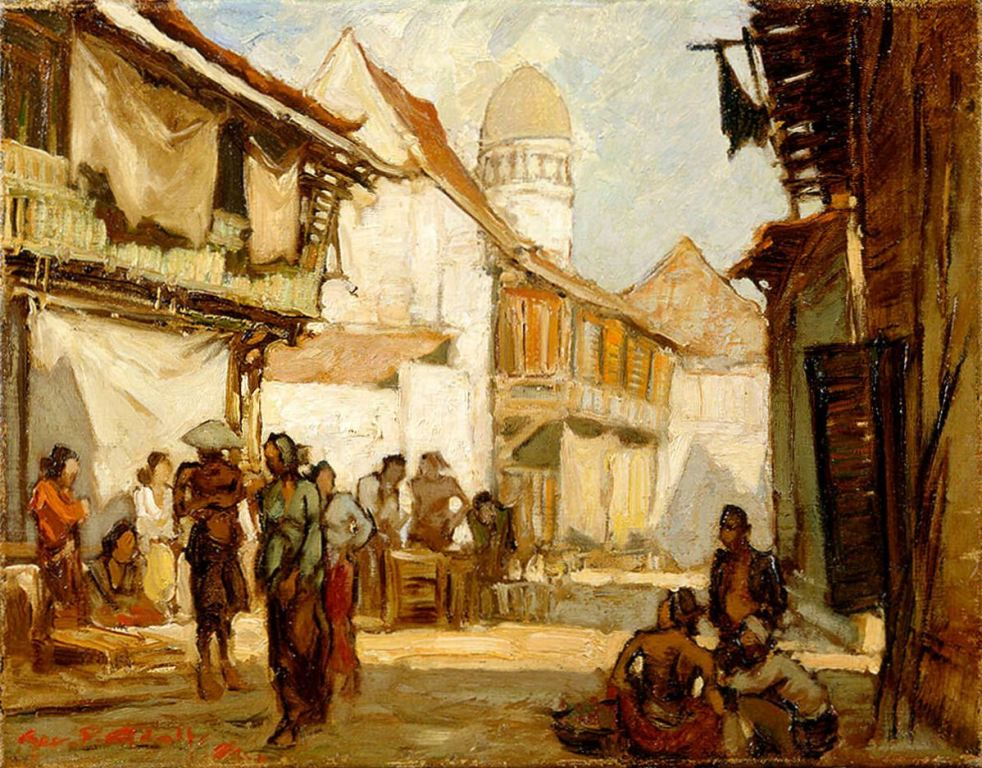

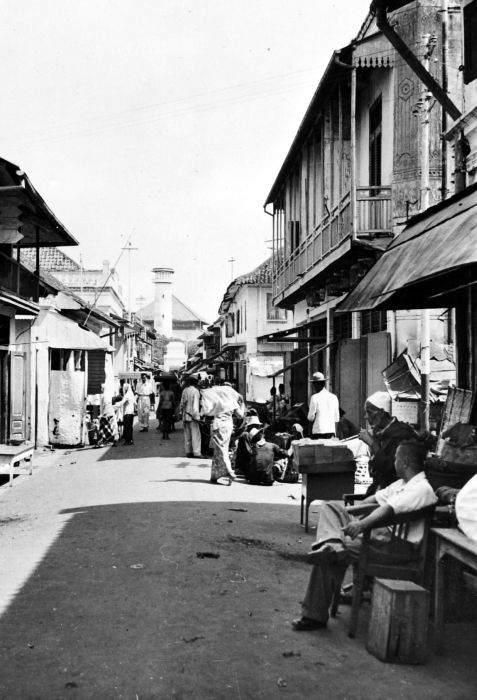

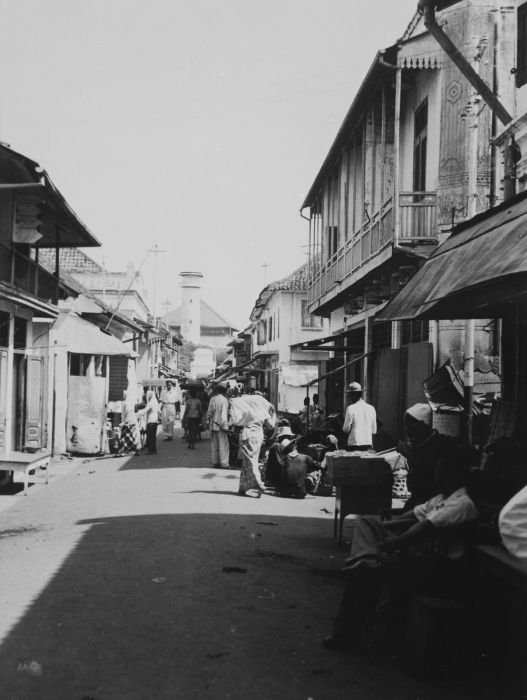

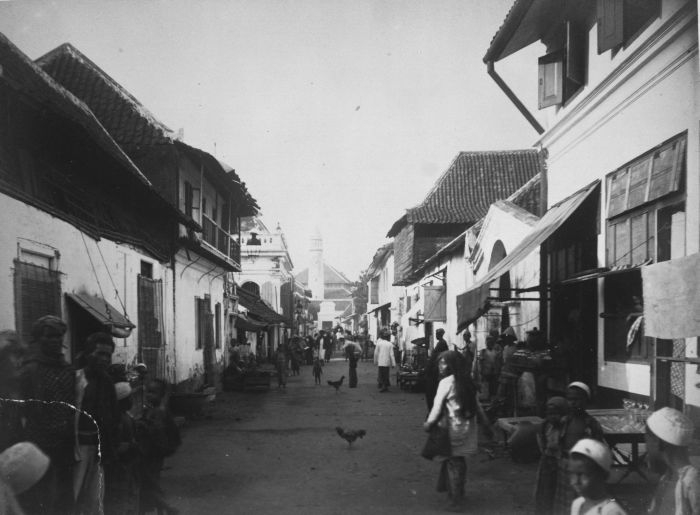

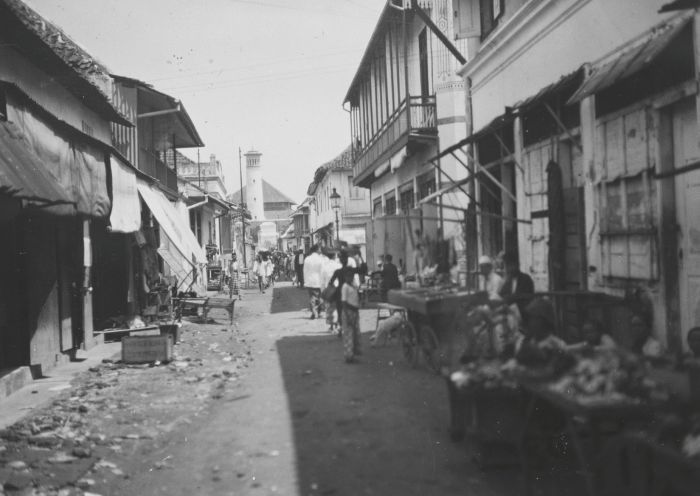

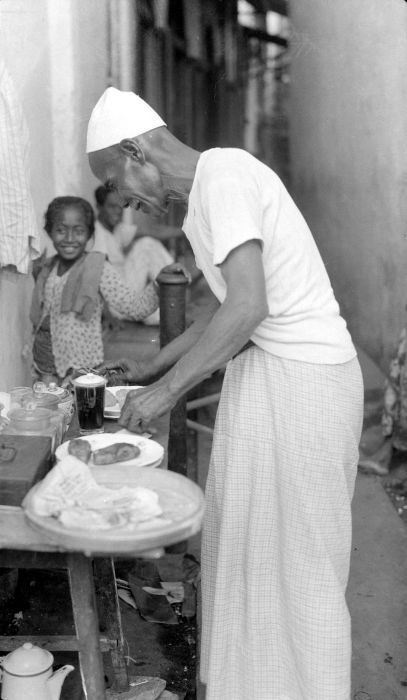

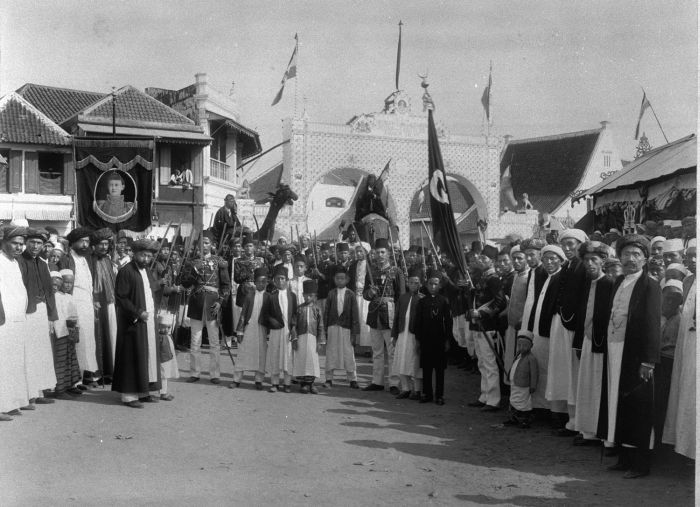
