= Tuban =

Coordinates: 6.9°S 112.05°E

- Regency and Town
- Town of Tuban; Kota Tuban

Other transcription(s)
  - Javanese: ꦏꦼꦕꦩꦠꦤ꧀ ꦠꦸꦧꦤ꧀
  - Chinese: 图班区
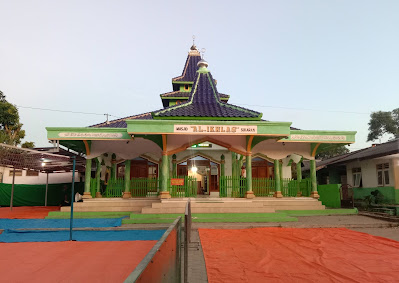
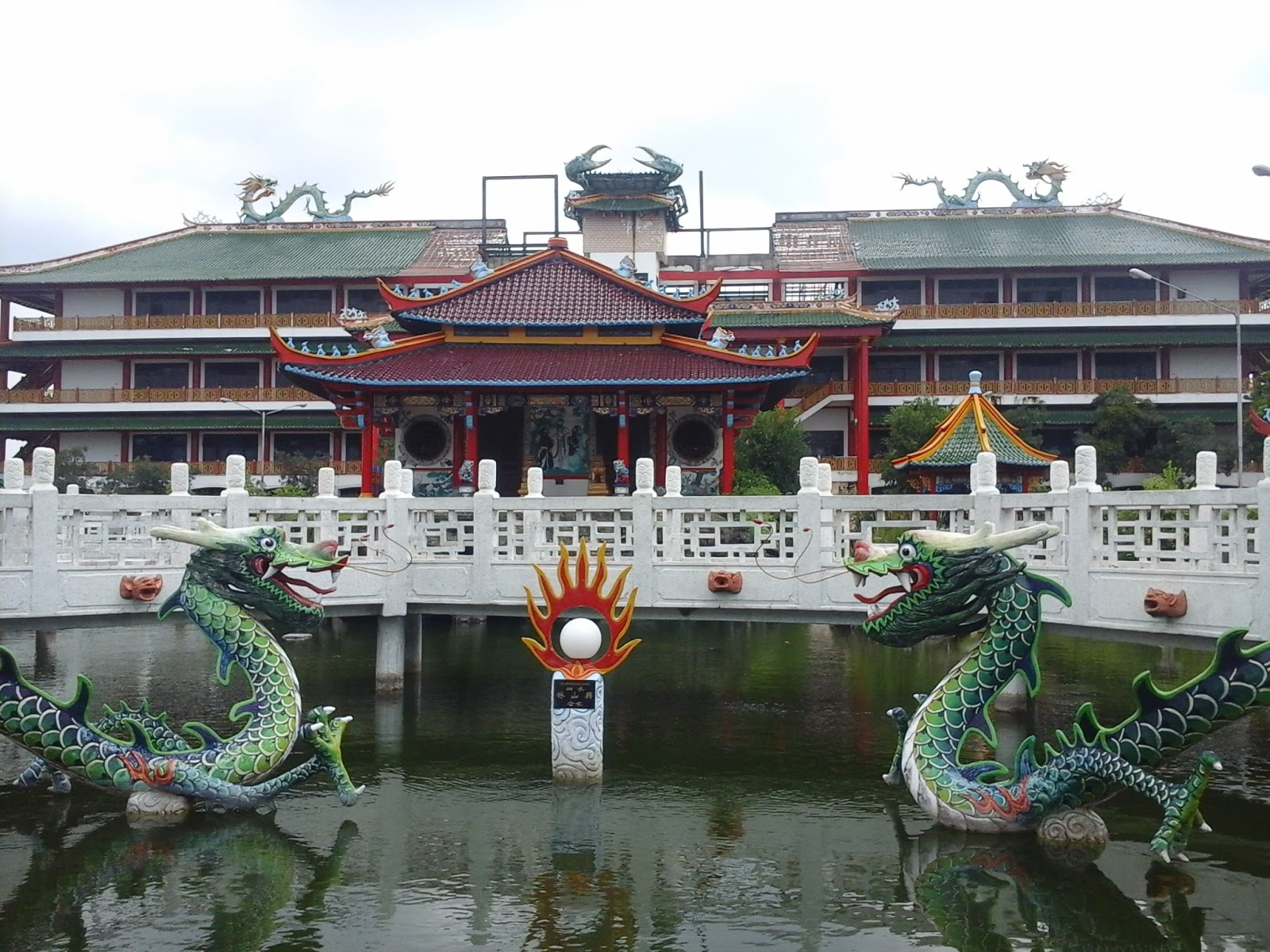
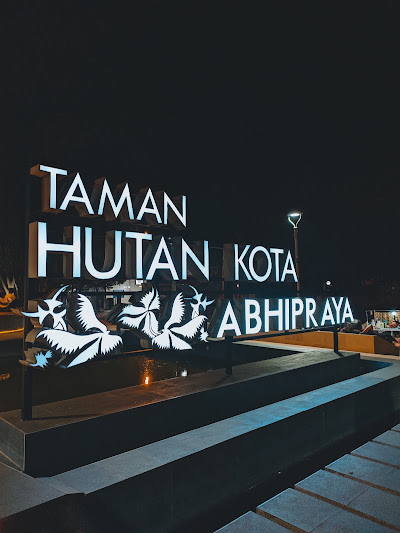
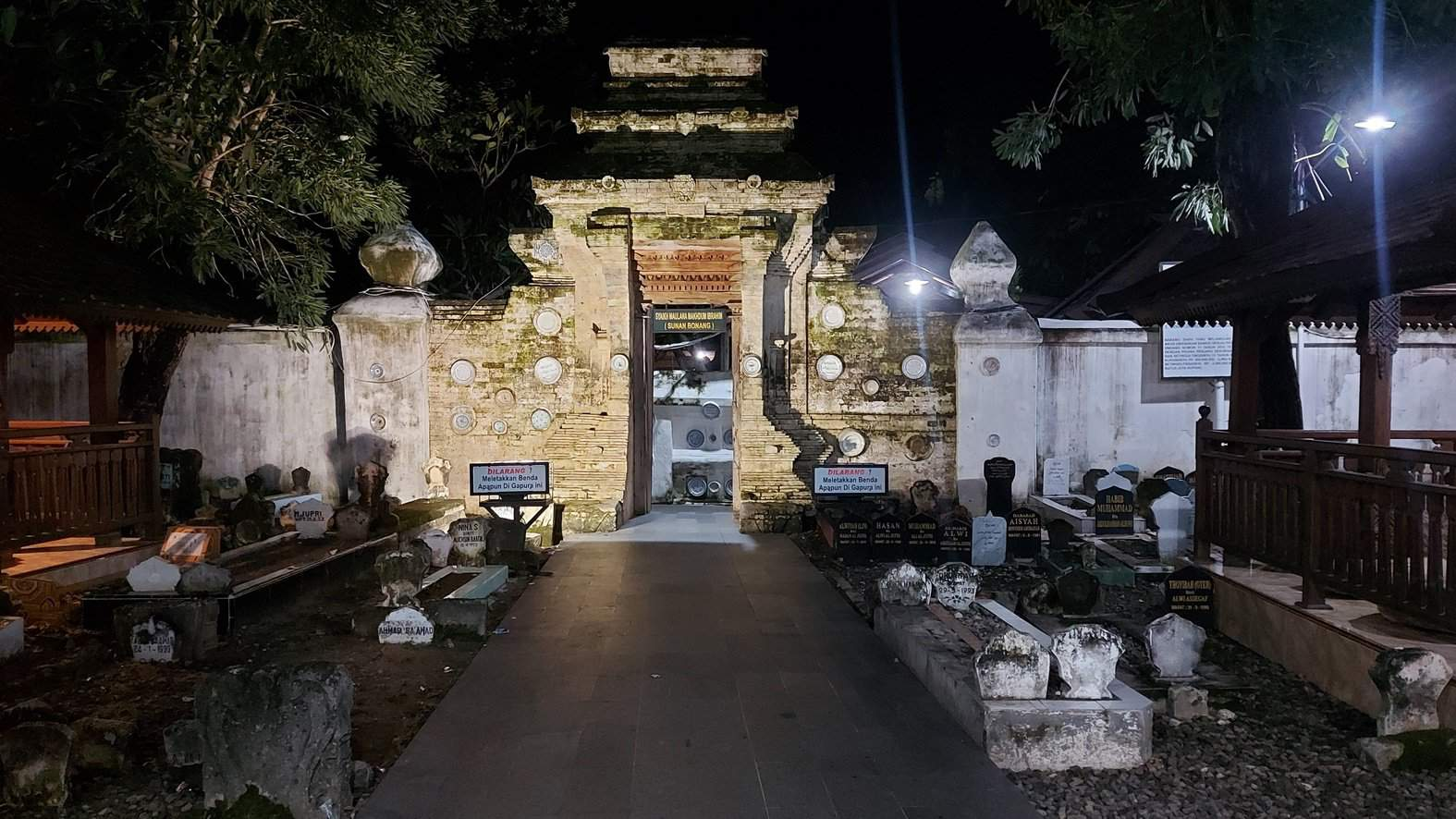
- Clockwise, from top left : Al-Ikhlas Mosque, Kwan Sing Bio temple, Abipraya city park, Sunan Bonang mausoleum complex

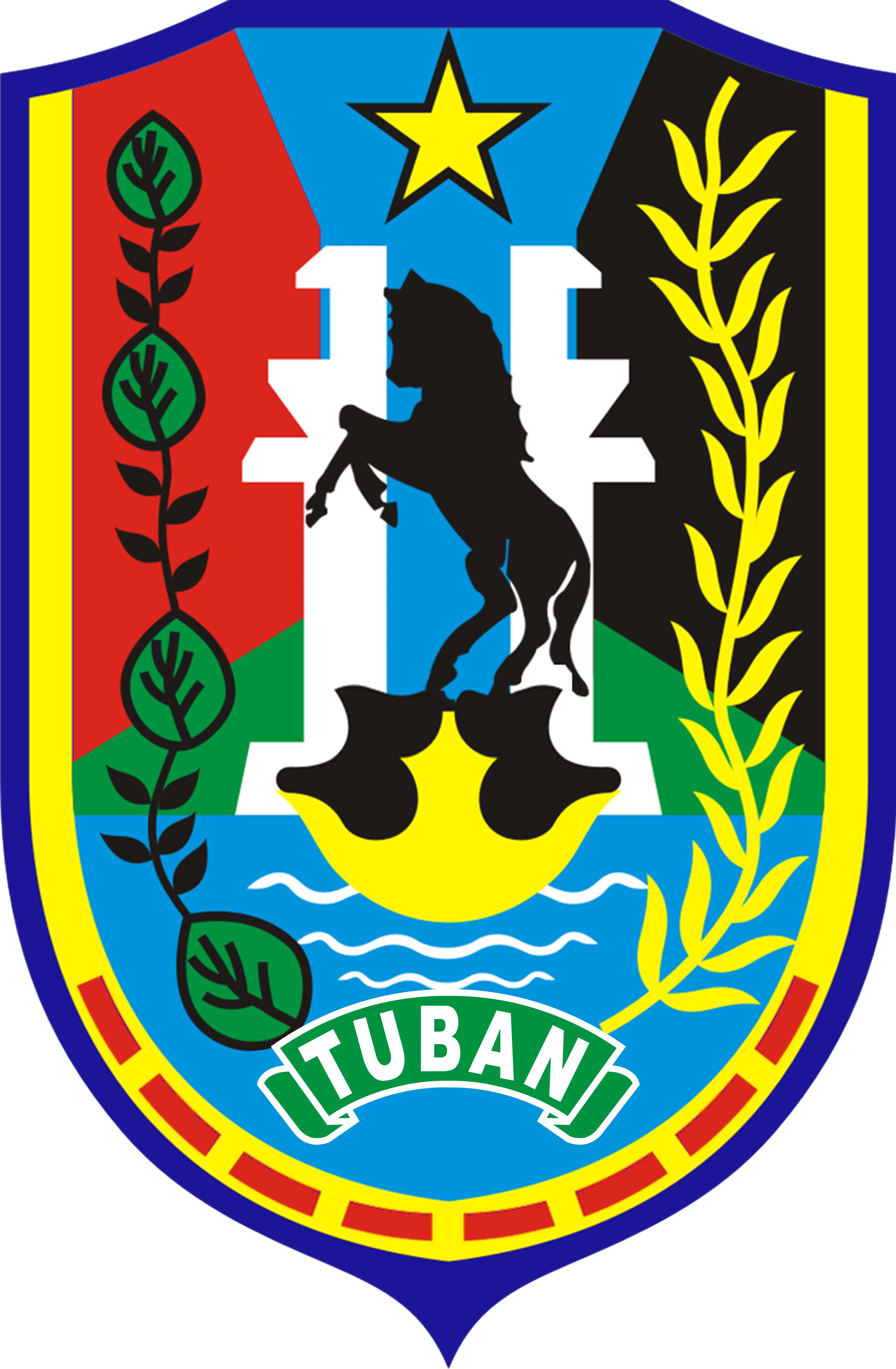
- Coat of arms
- Motto: Bumi Ronggolawe (Land of Ronggolawe)
- Location within East Java

- Location in Java and Indonesia Tuban (Indonesia)
- Country: Indonesia
- Region: Java
- Province: East Java
- Founded: 1293

Government
  - Mayor: Drs. Raden Mochamad Dani Ramdhani

Area
  - Total: 21.29 km^{2} (8.22 sq mi)
- Elevation: 65 m (213 ft)

Population (mid 2025 estimate)
  - Total: 88,128
  - Density: 4,139/km^{2} (10,720/sq mi)
- Time zone: UTC+7 (IWST)
- Postal code: 62311 - 62319
- Area code: 17
- Vehicle registration: S

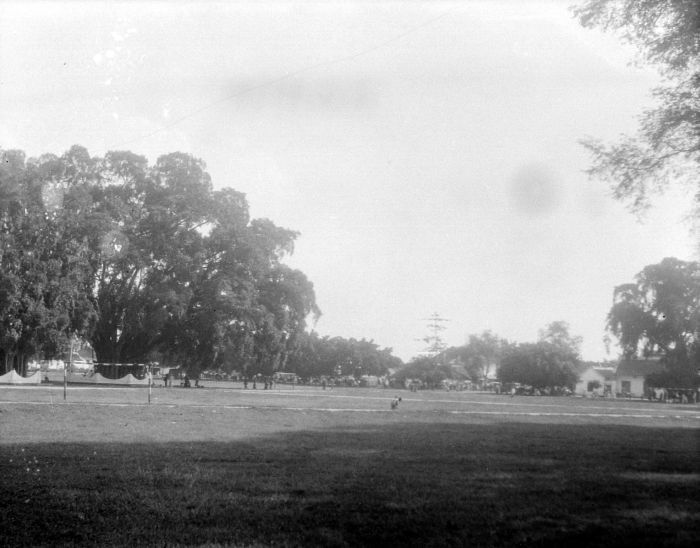
The alun-alun or the town square of Tuban in 1929

Tuban is a town located on the north coast of Java, in Tuban Regency (of which the town is the administrative capital), approximately 100 km (62 mi) west of Surabaya, the capital of East Java. Tuban Regency is surrounded by Lamongan Regency in the east, Bojonegoro Regency in the south, and Rembang Regency, Central Java in the west. Tuban town covers 21.29 km^{2} (8.22 sq mi) and in mid 2025 had an officially estimated population of 88,128.

As an ancient town, Tuban is of considerable historical and cultural value. The most prominent feature is the beauty of the scenery such as beaches, caves, and forests, especially the teak forest.

Tuban was formerly an important port in the Majapahit era and is mentioned in Chinese records from the eleventh century. An ancient anchor from one of Kublai Khan's ships is preserved in the historical museum. Tuban is believed to have been Islamised before its conquest by Demak c. 1527. Even following its Islamisation, it remained loyal to Hindu-Buddhist Majapahit in the interior. The grave of Sunan Bonang, a sixteenth-century Islamic missionary - one of the Wali Sanga involved in the initial spread of Islam in Java, is located in Tuban. The site is within a few minutes walk of the alun-alun (town square). This site is an important destination for Muslim pilgrims.

The Dutch name of the city is 'Toeban'.

== History ==
The town's name has been derived from the following story: a mythical pair of birds flying from Majapahit to Demak dropped a precious heirloom stone on the town thereafter named Tuban based on the Javanese phrase "waTU tiBAN", which means "stone fallen from the sky". Another explanation refers to flooding ("meTU BANyu" meaning "water streaming out") that occurred when the aristocratic Islamic scholar Raden Dandang Wacana entered the Papringan Forest, discovering an old well near the seaside that miraculously contained freshwater. The name has furthermore been derived from "Tubo", meaning poison, in keeping with the name of a Tubanese district named Jenu to this day, which carries the same meaning.

The official history of Tuban began in the Majapahit era in the 13th century. There was once an important ceremony when the king of Majapahit crowned Ronggolawe as the principal of the Tuban region. It was held on 12 November 1293 and that date has become the anniversary of Tuban, making it more ancient than Surabaya. Tuban's 700th anniversary was celebrated with a grand parade of decorated floats in 1993. The spread of Islam was pioneered by Sunan Bonang and his follower Sunan Kalijaga, who was the son of the Tubanese principal in the 13th century. Tuban was considered a center of Islamic culture and politics throughout the 15th century.

== Economy ==
Tuban is famous for tobacco and hardwood teak production. PT Semen Gresik, a major state-owned cement company, opened the largest cement factory in Indonesia in Tuban in 1994. A petrochemical plant operated by Trans-Pacific Petrochemical Indotama (TPPI) opened in 2006 after several years of delays. in 2010 also will be built in Tuban Holcim cement plant & Coal Fired Power Station be built in Jenu.

== Education ==
There are four universities in Tuban, Universitas Sunan Bonang and the recently established Universitas Ronggolawe (UNIROW), which started as a Teacher Training College named IKIP PGRI TUBAN, STITMA and STIKES NU (College of Health Sciences Nahdlatul Ulama Tuban) which was inaugurated by Health Minister Hj. Siti Fadilah Supari. Voluntary Service Overseas posted several ELT volunteers to train local counterparts from 1989 onwards, followed by teachers from Volunteers in Asia, all warmly received as the only Westerners (called Londo, derived from the Javanese word for Belanda = Dutch) in the town. Among the town's secondary schools is Madrasah Tsanawiyah Negeri Tuban.

== Tourism ==
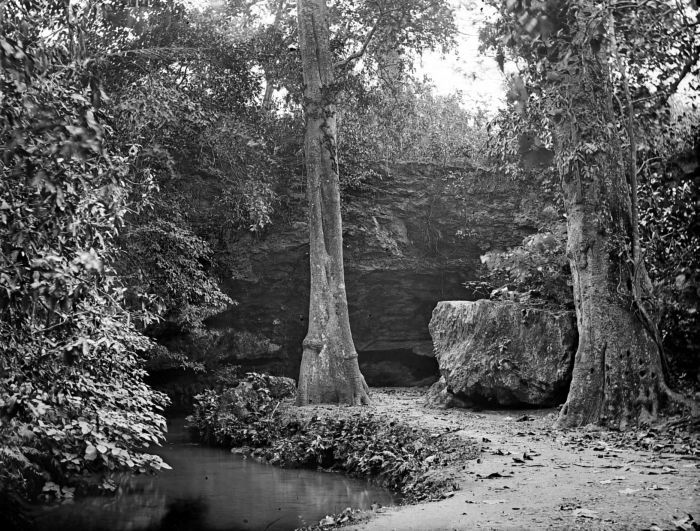
Cave in Rengel village, Tuban during the Dutch colonial period. 1900–1940.

Tuban is famous for its unique batik, locally known as Batik Gedog. Typical motifs are sea animals in dark colours such as blue and purple. There is a traditional Chinese temple named Klenteng "Kwan Sing Bio" by the beach, which is visited by many local tourists from Surabaya and its environs, especially when Imlek, the Chinese New Year is celebrated.

Tuban is known as the "City of a Thousand Caves" since there are so many caves in the area, containing both stalactites and stalagmites. Famous caves such as Goa Akbar and Goa Maharani (which contain sophisticated pre-formed statues believed to be natural by young and old) are located near the city. Besides, there are many recreational sites worth visiting, such as Goa Ngerong, a natural swimming pool called Pemandian Alam Bektiharjo, a waterfall named Air Terjun Nglirip, and the beach and pier for young couples, Pantai Boom.

Tuban is also well known for its beverage 'tuak', a strong palm wine taken from the Aren tree (called uwit bogor) served in large bamboo mugs called centak. Historically, the Tubanese used tuak as a strategic weapon against the colonial invaders, who were unable to fight when inebriated. Its non-alcoholic variety named Legen is drunk by women and children. Tuak and a kind of gin named arak are also served at traditional dance parties known as Tayuban or Sindiran, at which heavily made-up and padded female entertainers called Waranggono sing satirical songs and dance with paying males until the break of dawn, accompanied by a small gamelan orchestra. The dance movements are a vulgarised version of the Central Javanese palatial dance style known as Srimpi. One of the most notable of these entertainers, Nyi Sumini, was selected as one of five representatives to perform at Jakarta's Taman Mini Indonesia Indah Park. One of Indonesia's most famous and prolific pop bands, Koes Plus, hailed from Tuban.

The most luxurious hotel in town, the Hotel Mustika was burnt to the ground when riots broke out after one of the candidates accused his opponents of having framed the outcome of the local elections to decide who would become the next regent or Bupati. The first female candidate in Tuban's history, Haeny Relawati, won and the instigator of the riots has been imprisoned.

== Kwan Sing Bio Temple ==
Tuban has the largest statue in Southeast Asia of Kwan Sing Tee Koen, aka Kwan Kong. The statue is located inside the compound of the Tri Dharma Kwan Sing Kwan Sing Bio Chinese Temple and is 30 metres (98 ft) high. Some Islamic extremists make use of this opportunity to protest against this statue citing that the statue is bigger than Indonesia's statue of General of the Army Raden Sudirman at Sudirman Street, Jakarta. A temple spokesperson explained that the original statue of Kwan Sing Tee Koen is about 15 centimetres (5.9 in) and is enshrined inside the temple for the devotees to worship, whereas the 30-meter statue is only a symbolic monument. A construction permit was officially obtained from a local authority, and many Islamic organizations in Tuban did not object to the construction of the statue, however, some religious extremists outside Tuban tried to create religious discrimination by making a comparison of the Kwan Sing Tee Koen and Sudirman statues. In August 2017 escalating protests led to the statue of Kwan Kong being covered with a white sheet, and a mob at Surabaya demanded for the statue's destruction.

== Climate ==
Tuban has a tropical savanna climate (Aw) with moderate to little rainfall from April to November and heavy rainfall from December to March.

Climate data for Tuban
Month	Jan	Feb	Mar	Apr	May	Jun	Jul	Aug	Sep	Oct	Nov	Dec	Year
Mean daily maximum °C (°F)	30.5 (86.9)	30.4 (86.7)	30.8 (87.4)	31.5 (88.7)	31.7 (89.1)	31.5 (88.7)	31.4 (88.5)	32.1 (89.8)	33.0 (91.4)	33.4 (92.1)	33.0 (91.4)	31.3 (88.3)	31.7 (89.1)
Daily mean °C (°F)	26.8 (80.2)	26.7 (80.1)	26.9 (80.4)	27.3 (81.1)	27.4 (81.3)	26.9 (80.4)	26.6 (79.9)	26.9 (80.4)	27.7 (81.9)	28.3 (82.9)	28.3 (82.9)	27.2 (81.0)	27.3 (81.0)
Mean daily minimum °C (°F)	23.2 (73.8)	23.1 (73.6)	23.1 (73.6)	23.2 (73.8)	23.1 (73.6)	22.4 (72.3)	21.8 (71.2)	21.8 (71.2)	22.4 (72.3)	23.3 (73.9)	23.6 (74.5)	23.2 (73.8)	22.9 (73.1)
Average rainfall mm (inches)	258 (10.2)	220 (8.7)	213 (8.4)	124 (4.9)	94 (3.7)	62 (2.4)	33 (1.3)	20 (0.8)	20 (0.8)	54 (2.1)	117 (4.6)	219 (8.6)	1,434 (56.5)
Source: Climate-Data.org

== Notable people ==
- Maria Kristin Yulianti, badminton player
- Koes Plus, musician
- Haeny Relawati, first female regent (bupati)
- Sunan Bonang, one of Wali Songo
- Dewangga Wisma S.K., student
- Willem Thomas de Vogel, colonial physician and official
