= Ali al-Uraydi =

Hadith scholar of Abbasid era

Ali al-Uraydi ibn Ja'far al-Sadiq
- علي العريضي بن جعفر الصادق

Personal life
- Born: 763 CE Medina
- Died: 818 CE (aged 56) 201 AH Medina
- Children: Ahmad al-Sha'rani; Hasan; Ja'far al-Asghar; Muhammad al-Naqib
- Parent: Ja'far al-Sadiq (father)
- Era: Islamic Golden Age (Abbasid era)
- Known for: Hadith Scholar
- Occupation: Islamic Scholar

Religious life
- Religion: Islam
- Denomination: Shia

Muslim leader
- Disciple of: Musa al-Kadhim

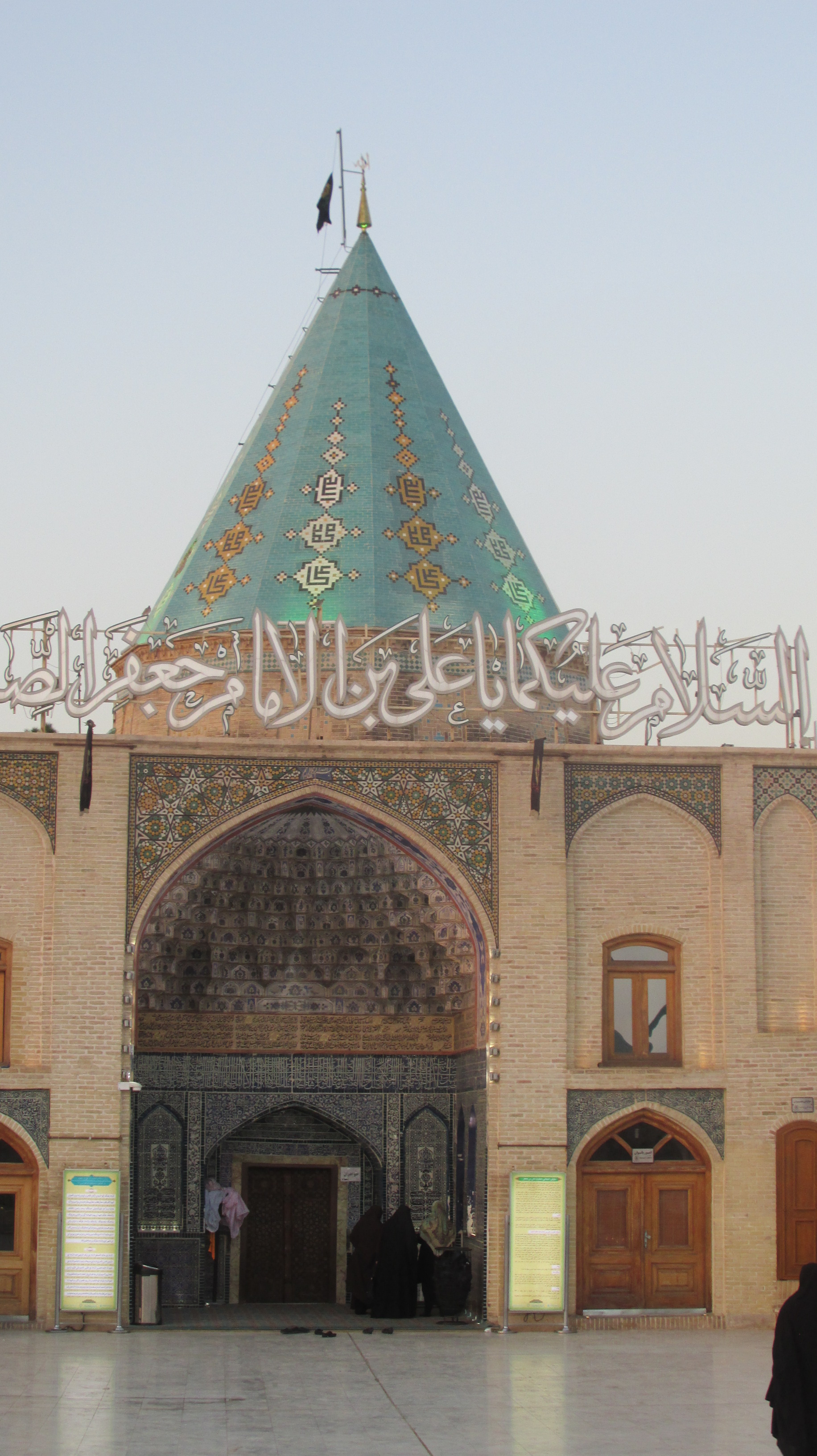
A photo of a shrine attributed to Ali ibn Ja'far in Qom

Ali al-Uraydi ibn Ja'far al-Sadiq (Arabic: علي العريضي بن جعفر الصادق, romanized: ʿAlī al-ʿUrayḍī ibn Jaʿfar al-Ṣādiq), simply known as Ali al-Uraydi, was a Muslim scholar and the son of Ja'far al-Sadiq, the sixth Shia Imam for Twelvers and Ismailis. Thus he was the brother of Isma'il, Abdullah al-Aftah, Muhammad Al-Dibaj and Musa al-Kazim. He was known by the title al-Uraydi, because he lived in an area called Urayd, about 4 miles (or 6.4 km) from Medina. He was also known by the nickname Abu al-Hasan (i.e. father of Hasan). In Shia tradition by Shaykh Tusi, he was a close companion of his brother Musa al-Kazim, from whom he narrated hadith, and was reportedly a companion of Ali al-Rida (799–819) and Muhammad al-Jawad (819–835), and also met Ali al-Hadi (835–868) while he was young.

== Life ==
Ali al-Uraydi (علي العريضي) was born and raised in Medina. He was the youngest son of Ja'far al-Sadiq. After his father died whilst he was still a child, he left Medina for the town of Al-Urayd, where he settled and became the sheikh of all Banu Hashim and the Naqib (prefect) of the descendants of Muhammad.

He lived approximately 100 years, until the time of his brother Musa al-Kazim’s great-grandson Ali al-Hadi (828-868) and died in Al-Urayd and was buried there.

== Descendants ==
The children and descendants of Ali al-Uraydi became known as al-Uraydiyun. They inhabited many areas, including Al-Urayd, Kufa, Baghdad, Sham (the region of Syria), Nusaybin, Turkey, Ahwaz, Rayy (Tehran), Isfahan, Yazd, Qom, Khwarazm and Afghanistan. His sons were:

- Ahmad al-Sha'rani
- Hasan
- Ja'far al-Asghar
- Muhammad al-Naqib - who was born in Medina. After his father died, he left for Basra, where he became the Naqib (prefect) of the Ahl al-Bayt. He was a man of great learning who preferred isolation and was known for his zuhd (abstinence).
  - Isa al-Rumi - He was a great 'alim (learned scholar) and ‘arif (spiritual master). He was the Naqib of the Ahl al-Bayt in Basra.
    - Ahmad al-Muhajir (873-956/260-345H) - who was born in Basra. Al-Tabari, the famous 'alim and historian, held him in great esteem and gave him immense respect. He held the company of Bishr al-Hafi, among others. After performing Hajj in 318 A.H. he migrated to Hadhramaut in the same year and settled there. From Hadhramaut he called people to God. He was given the title Al-Muhajjir (the Emigrant) primarily because he had travelled the path to God and secondarily because he had emigrated from Iraq to Hadhramaut. From Hadhramaut his descendants became the illustrious Alawi sadat, and most Sayyid’s and Habib’s residing in Indonesia and Southeast Asia are descended from him.
      - Ubayd Allah
        - Alawi - who became a great Imam. It is from his name from whom the name of the tribe Bani Alawi is derived. Therefore, the Bani Alawi is the Ashraaf sadat (noble descendants) of Muhammad. Furthermore, many families in Hadhramaut, India, the Hejaz, Africa, Indonesia, Malaysia, Singapore, Myanmar and the rest of the world are descendants of Imam Alawi ibn Ubayd Allah.
      - Muhammad
      - Ali
      - Husayn
  - Muhammad. His descendants currently reside in Isfahan, Iran.
  - Yahya. His descendants currently reside in Hillah, Iraq.
  - Ali (Abu Ja'far): His descendants reside in Homs, Syria.

== Religious knowledge ==
Ali al-Uraydi was a man of great knowledge. He was a transmitter of Hadith, and was quoted in a large number of books written by the famous 'ulama of his and subsequent ages.

== See also ==
- Alids
