= Gresik Regency =

Regency in East Java, Indonesia

Gresik Regency Kabupaten Gresik
- Regency

Regional transcription(s)
  - Javanese: Grêsik (Gêdrig) ڮرۤسيك (Pégon) ꦒꦽꦱꦶꦏ꧀ (Hånåcåråkå)
  - Madurese: Ghersè’ (Latèn) ک࣭ۤرسَيء (Pèghu) ꦓꦼꦂꦱꦺꦃ (Carakan)
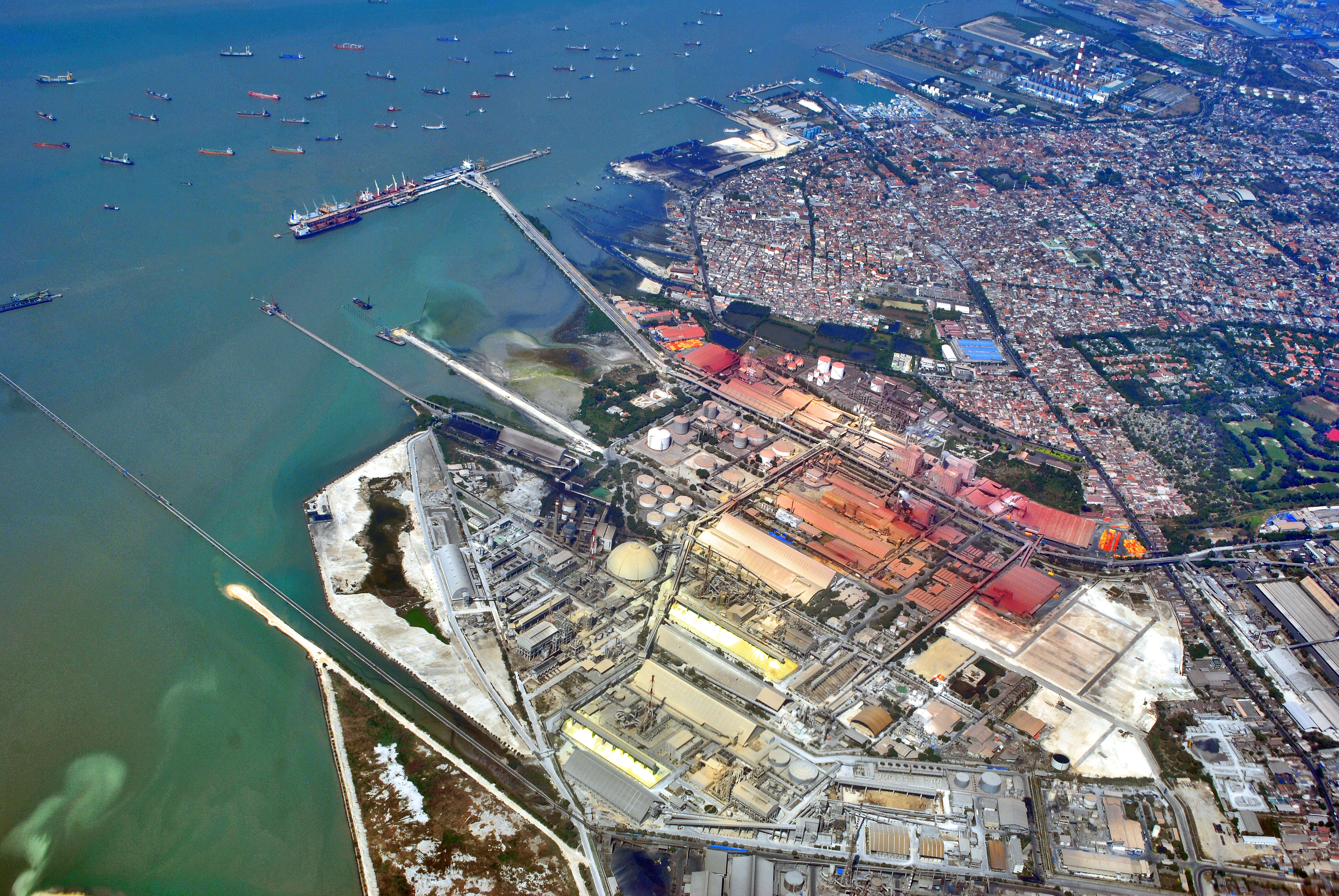
- Port of Petrokimia Gresik and Gresik settlements

- Seal
- Nicknames: Kota Pudak (City of Pudak); Kota Bandar (City of Bandar); Kota Industri (Industrial City); Kota Semen (City of Cement)
- Motto(s): Satya Bina Kertaharja (Faithful in fostering prosperity); Gresik Berhias Iman (Gresik Decorated with Faith)
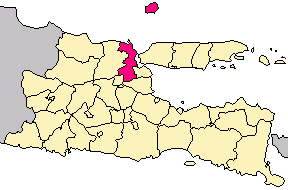
- Location within East Java
- Interactive map of Gresik Regency
- Location in Java and Indonesia Gresik Regency (Indonesia)
- Coordinates: 7°9′14″S 112°39′22″E
- Country: Indonesia
- Province: East Java
- Capital: Gresik

Government
  - Regent: Fandi Akhmad Yani
  - Vice Regent: Asluchul Alif

Area
  - Total: 1,264.01 km^{2} (488.04 sq mi)

Population (mid 2025 estimate)
  - Total: 1,343,465
  - Density: 1,062.86/km^{2} (2,752.79/sq mi)
- Time zone: UTC+7 (IWST)
- Area code: (+62) 31
- Website: gresikkab.go.id

Gresik Regency (older spelling: Grissee, Javanese: ꦒꦽꦱꦶꦏ꧀) is a regency within East Java Province of Indonesia. As well as a large part of the northern and western suburbs of the city of Surabaya, it includes the offshore Bawean Island, some 125 km to the north of Java and Madura. Almost a third of the Gresik Regency's area is the coastal area; the Districts in this zone are Kebomas District, (part of) Gresik District, Manyar District, Bungah District, and Ujungpangkah District.

The regency covers and an area of 1,264.01 km^{2}, and it had a population of 1,177,042 at the 2010 Census and 1,311,215 at the 2020 Census; the official estimate as of mid 2025 was 1,343,465 (comprising 675,387 males and 668,078 females). The regency's administrative centre is the town of Gresik, about 25 km to the northwest of Surabaya. Gresik Regency (excluding Bawean Island) is also part of Gerbangkertosusila, the metropolitan region of Surabaya.

== Etymology ==
Thomas Stamford Raffles in his book, The History of Java, reveals that the name of Gresik comes from the word Giri Gisik, which means "mountain near the coast", referring to the hilly topography of the Gresik town center near the coast.

== History ==
Since the 11th century, Gresik has become an international trade center visited by many nations such as Chinese, Arabs, Champa and Gujaratis. Gresik Regency is also the first entry point for Islam in Java, which among others is marked by the existence of ancient Islamic tombs of Sheikh Maulana Malik Ibrahim and Fatimah bint Maimun. Gresik has become one of the main ports and trade cities that are quite important since the 14th century, as well as being a haven for ships from Maluku to Sumatra and mainland Asia (including India and Persia). This continued until the VOC era.

The port of Gresik-Djaratan has functioned as an important commercial center since the eleventh century, trading with merchants from as far away as China, India, and Arabia. Some of these traders helped spread Islam in the area. In 1487 Sunan Giri, also known as Sultan Ainul Yaqin, began to rule Gresik. In his 1515 book, Suma Oriental, the Portuguese apothecary and traveller Tomé Pires described Gresik as "the jewel of Java in trading ports". Sunan Giri's descendants ruled the area for the following two centuries.

Initially the Gresik region was part of the Surabaya Regency. On 1 November 1974, the Central Government issued PP No. 38 of 1974. All government activities began to be gradually transferred to Gresik and the name was changed to Gresik Regency with a center of activity in Gresik town. Also in 1974 the Indonesian government made Gresik, now a suburb of Surabaya, part of Gerbangkertosusila Metropolitan Area, the official metropolitan region by the Government.

=== 21st-century Gresik ===
The town of Gresik has a reputation for its many coffee shops, called warkop (from warung kopi). In 2002, Petrokimia Putra (owned by PT Petrokimia Gresik), a soccer club from Gresik, has one national league title.

== Administration ==
The Gresik Regency is divided into eighteen administrative districts (kecamatan). The districts are tabulated below with their areas and their populations at the 2010 census and the 2020 census, together with the official estimates as at mid 2025. The mid 2022 estimates were revised downwards from 1,332,664 to 1,291,538; this reduction was notably in the districts immediately adjoining Surabaya. However population growth continued and by mid-2024 the total had been returned to 1,327,497. The table also includes the number of administrative villages in each district (totaling 329 rural desa and 27 urban kelurahan), and its post code.

Kode Wilayah	Name of District (kecamatan)	Area in km^{2}	Pop'n census 2010	Pop'n census 2020	Pop'n estimate mid 2025	No. of villages	Post code
35.25.06	Wringinanom	60.95	65,411	72,845	74,570	16	61176
35.25.15	Driyorejo	53.72	120,149	122,743	111,040	16	61177
35.25.08	Kedamean	70.09	55,715	61,221	64,967	15	61175
35.25.13	Menganti	69.85	119,278	144,028	137,285	22	61174
35.25.11	Cerme	71.19	69,217	81,215	84,945	25	61171
35.25.04	Benjeng	62.23	57,336	62,845	66,991	23	61172
35.25.02	Balongpanggang	64.38	49,035	53,689	56,501	25	61173
35.25.05	Duduksampeyan	82.36	43,783	47,058	49,832	23	61162
35.25.14	Kebomas	34.78	106,259	118,589	116,837	21 ^{(a)}	61121: 61124
35.25.16	Gresik	7.58	76,594	76,347	80,010	21 ^{(b)}	61111: 61119
35.25.10	Manyar	102.21	109,949	119,338	124,752	23	61151
35.25.12	Bungah	84.60	57,689	65,298	70,210	22	61152
35.25.09	Sidayu	54.13	40,650	43,492	45,083	21	61153
35.25.01	Dukun	63.90	54,384	62,738	66,589	26	61155
35.25.03	Panceng	62.47	39,535	50,525	54,168	14	61156
35.25.07	Ujung Pangkah	119.46	41,828	48,955	52,921	13	61154
35.25.17	Sangkapura ^{(c)}	128.20	45,755	50,612	55,344	17	61181
35.25.18	Tambak ^{(c)}	71.93	24,475	29,677	31,420	13	61182
	Totals	1,264.01	1,177,042	1,311,215	1,343,465	356	

Notes: (a) comprising 11 kelurahan (Gending, Gulomantung, Indro, Kawis Anyar, Kebomas, Ngargosari, Prambangan, Sidomoro, Sidomukti, Singosari and Tenggulunan) and 10 desa.
(b) comprising 16 kelurahan (Bedilan, Karangpoh, Karangturi, Kebungson, Kemuteran, Kroman, Lumpur, Ngipik, Pekauman, Pekelingan, Sidokumpul, Sukodono, Sukorame, Tlogopatut, Tlogopojok and Trate) and 5 desa.
(c) Sangkapura and Tambak districts together constitute the island of Pulau Bawean, lying to the north of Madura but administratively a part of Gresik Regency.

== Industry ==
A large number of industries have established themselves in Gresik, mainly supporting agriculture and agricultural machinery. A lot of home-based industry exists, making caps (songkoks), bags, etc.

Two of the largest factories in Gresik are Semen Gresik (Gresik Portland Cement) and Petrokimia Gresik. Semen Gresik, the largest cement factory in Indonesia, supplies 41% of the Indonesian market; while Petrokimia Gresik, the most complete fertilizer producer in Indonesia, supplies 50% of national subsidized fertilizers.

== Climate ==
Gresik has a humidity varying between 44% and 88%. The maximum humidity is 88% and the average humidity is 58%. The wind velocity of Gresik is within the range of 0–18 km/hour. The maximum wind velocity is 18 km/hour and the average is 12.6 km/hour. The temperature of this city is within the range of 23 °C-35 °C with the average temperature is 28.5 °C.

Climate data for Gresik, Gresik Regency (elevation 10 m or 33 ft)
Month	Jan	Feb	Mar	Apr	May	Jun	Jul	Aug	Sep	Oct	Nov	Dec	Year
Mean daily maximum °C (°F)	30.7 (87.3)	30.8 (87.4)	31 (88)	31.6 (88.9)	31.7 (89.1)	31.5 (88.7)	31.1 (88.0)	31.8 (89.2)	32.4 (90.3)	33.2 (91.8)	33.1 (91.6)	31.4 (88.5)	31.7 (89.1)
Daily mean °C (°F)	27.2 (81.0)	27.2 (81.0)	27.2 (81.0)	27.6 (81.7)	27.5 (81.5)	27 (81)	26.6 (79.9)	26.9 (80.4)	27.5 (81.5)	28.6 (83.5)	28.7 (83.7)	27.6 (81.7)	27.5 (81.5)
Mean daily minimum °C (°F)	23.8 (74.8)	23.6 (74.5)	23.5 (74.3)	23.7 (74.7)	23.4 (74.1)	22.6 (72.7)	22.1 (71.8)	22.1 (71.8)	22.7 (72.9)	24.1 (75.4)	24.3 (75.7)	23.9 (75.0)	23.3 (74.0)
Average precipitation mm (inches)	300 (11.8)	267 (10.5)	263 (10.4)	169 (6.7)	123 (4.8)	63 (2.5)	37 (1.5)	18 (0.7)	23 (0.9)	52 (2.0)	129 (5.1)	242 (9.5)	1,686 (66.4)
Average relative humidity (%)	82.3	82.8	83.2	80.1	79	76	73.4	70.5	68.7	68.7	73	79.3	76.4
Source 1: Climate-Data.org (temp & precip)
Source 2: Weatherbase (humidity)
