= Indonesian Islamic Museum K.H. Hasyim Asy'ari =

Museum in Jombang, Indonesia

Indonesian Islamic Museum K.H. Hasyim Asyari
- Museum Islam Indonesia K.H. Hasyim Asyari
- Exterior of the museum, 2017

- Location within Indonesia Location within Java
- Established: 2018
- Location: Jombang Regency, East Java, Indonesia
- Coordinates: 7°36′31″S 112°14′05″E
- Type: Islamic history
- Visitors: 8,000–10,000 per month
- Architect: Sugeng Gunadi
- Owner: Ministry of Culture
- Public transit access: None

The Indonesian Islamic Museum K.H. Hasyim Asyari (Indonesian: Museum Islam Indonesia K.H. Hasyim Asy'ari, MINHA) is a museum in Jombang, East Java, Indonesia. Constructed between 2014 and 2018, the museum was inaugurated in 2018. The three-storey building contains exhibits about the spread of Islam in Indonesia, the rise of Islamic organizations in the colonial era, and the role of Islam in independent Indonesia. The site, which lies close to the grave of former president Abdurrahman Wahid, receives between 8,000 and 10,000 visitors per month.

== Description ==
MINHA is located at Tebuireng Gg. 4 in Jombang Regency, East Java, Indonesia, approximately 6.7 kilometres (4.2 mi) from the alun-alun (town square) of Jombang. It is located upon the property of the Tebuireng pesantren (Islamic boarding school), having been built in a parking lot used by persons visiting the grave (ziarah) of Abdurrahman Wahid. It is across the street from Hasyim Asy'ari University, approximately 500 metres (1,600 ft) from the Tebuireng complex entrance. The museum complex sits upon approximately 4.9 hectares (12 acres) of land.

The museum building is pyramidal in shape, with a square base, and covers an area of 5,000 square metres (54,000 sq ft). The design features two interlocking roofs, one slightly elevated above the other, which are intended to represent a kyai (scholar) and santri (student). The museum consists of three storeys. Collections on the first storey focus on the history of the spread of Islam in Indonesia from the 11th through 19th centuries CE, with items on the second storey concentrating on the emergence of Islamic organizations in colonial Indonesia as well as Islam's contributions to Indonesian independence. The third storey deals with Islam in independent Indonesia.

In front of the museum is the At-Tauhid Monument, which bears the 99 names of God in Islam. Fountains adorn the approach to the museum. As of 2026, the museum is open to the public from Tuesday through Sunday.

== Collections ==
Collections of MINHA include various artefacts from Islamic kingdoms throughout the Indonesian archipelago, including jewels and coats of arms. Other artefacts include religious texts on fiqh (Islamic jurisprudence) and tasawuf (Sufism), as well as Middle Eastern pottery uncovered in Riau, coins, clothing, and spices. Exhibits are divided regionally, with sections on the major islands of Sumatra, Java, Sulawesi, and Borneo, and another section dedicated to Eastern Indonesia.

Further exhibits explore the role of Islam in Indonesia's independence as well as major Islamic thinkers in independent Indonesia. Information is communicated through wall displays. In 2023, some three hundred items were included in the collection. An interactive exhibition allows visitors to simulate conserving artefacts.

A room dedicated to Abdurrahman Wahid, an Islamic scholar and former President of Indonesia, is located within the museum. Intended to provide visitors with an understanding of his life, it contains various books about him, a typewriter he had used, as well as a peci made of woven Lygodium that he received from a scholar in Gorontalo. Another room is dedicated to Hasyim Asy'ari, one of the founders of the Islamic organization Nahdlatul Ulama. It includes a turban and cane he had owned, as well as several texts from his library.

== History ==
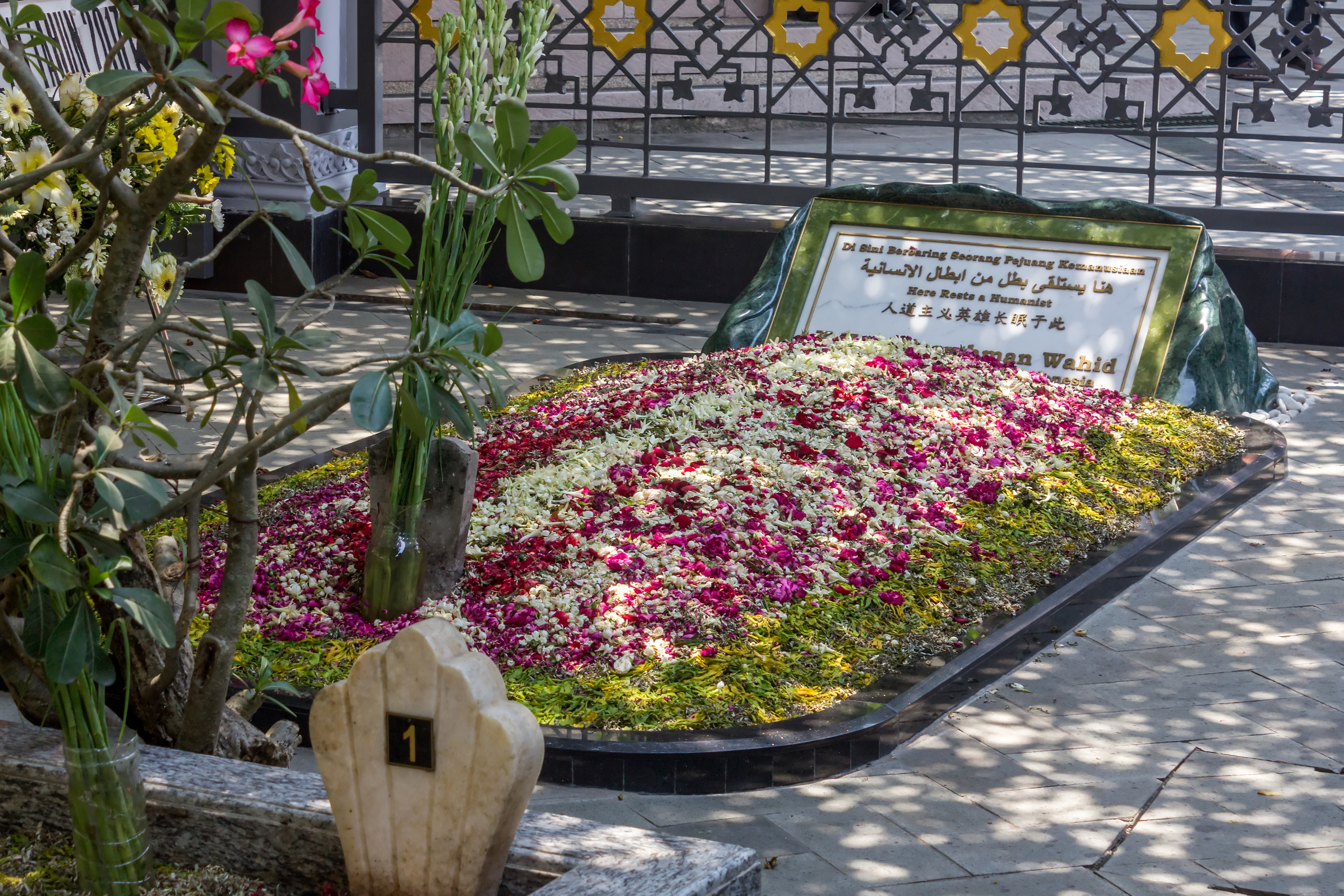
The grave of Abdurrahman Wahid; most museum visitors participate in a pilgrimage as well.

Initial development of MINHA began in 2010, when the museum was proposed to the Susilo Bambang Yudhoyono government. A design by Sugeng Gunadi was chosen for the project, and construction began in 2014. A budget of Rp 30 billion was allocated by the Ministry of Culture, with further support provided by the governments of East Java and Jombang as well as the Tebuireng pesantren. The museum was inaugurated by President Joko Widodo on 18 December 2018, with the stated mission of "spread[ing] awareness that Indonesia adheres to Pancasila's five principles, which align with the values of prominent Islamic figures and nationalists alike." At this time, public access was limited to the first floor.

In early 2020, MINHA was temporarily closed due to the COVID-19 pandemic. By June 2021, it had partially reopened, again with access limited to the first floor. At the same time, pesantren staff noted the difficulty of managing the available facilities, and Minister of Culture Hilmar Farid suggested during a May visit that professional support was required. MINHA returned to full operations effective 10 November 2021, with a ribbon-cutting ceremony hosted by Tebuireng pesantren leader Abdul Hakim Mahfudz.

By 2022, MINHA reported an average attendance of 8,000 to 10,000 visitors monthly; most were also visiting the grave of Abdurrahman Wahid. The museum began to be managed by the Indonesian Heritage Agency, and underwent extensive expansions. A room dedicated to Abdurrahman Wahid was opened to the public in February 2024, while one dedicated to Hasyim Asy'ari was refurbished. The museum was closed beginning on 1 November 2025, again for refurbishments. It reopened on 13 January 2026, having installed new displays, revised its exhibit texts, and created new thematic spaces.

== Works cited ==
- @museum.islam.indonesia; (31 October 2025). "Tutup Sementara" [Temporarily Closed] (in Indonesian) – via Instagram.
- Ambarwati, Sinta (15 January 2026). "MINHA Diharapkan Menjadi Ruang Dialog dan Pembelajaran Publik" [MINHA Hoped to Become Space for Dialogue and Public Learning] (in Indonesian). Antara. Archived from the original on 10 March 2026.
- Chusna, Asmaul (10 November 2021). "Museum K.H. Hasyim Asy'ari di Pesantren Tebuireng-Jombang Kembali Dibuka" [K.H. Hasyim Asy'ari Museum at Tebuireng Pesantren in Jombang Reopens] (in Indonesian). Antara. Archived from the original on 10 March 2026.
- Imada, Izza Nurul; Nafisah (2025). "Representasi Islam pada Bangunan Museum Islam K.H. Hasyim Asy'ari". Abstrak : Jurnal Kajian Ilmu Seni, Media Dan Desain. 2 (4): 33–50. doi:10.62383/abstrak.v2i4.675.
- "Indonesian Islamic Museum K.H. Hasyim Asy'ari". Indonesian Heritage Agency. Archived from the original on 10 March 2026.
- Ishomuddin (18 December 2018). "Arsitektur Museum Islam di Jombang Simbolkan Kiai dan Santri" [Architecture of the Islamic Museum in Jombang Symbolizes a Teacher and Student]. Tempo. Archived from the original on 10 March 2026.
- Noorca, Dhafintya (12 August 2023). "Museum Islam Indonesia KH Hasyim Asy'ari: HTM, Lokasi dan Koleksi" [Indonesian Islamic Museum K.H Hasyim Asy'ari: Tickets, Location, and Collections]. IDN Times (in Indonesian). Archived from the original on 9 March 2026.
- Rizqa, Hasanul (1 June 2021). "Museum Islam Indonesia KH Hasyim Asy'ari Shines Light on History of Islam in Archipelago". Republika. Archived from the original on 10 March 2026.
- Rochman, Aman (20 December 2018). "Museum Islam Indonesia KH Hasyim Asy'ari Shines Light on History of Islam in Archipelago". The Jakarta Post. Archived from the original on 9 March 2026.
- Santoso, Mely (29 August 2022). "Museum KH. Hasyim As'ary: Destinasi Islam di Pesantren Tebuireng" [KH. Hasyim As'ary Museum: An Islamic Destination at Tebuireng Pesantren]. Gatra (in Indonesian). Archived from the original on 10 March 2026.
- "Seperti Apa Ruang Gur Dur di Museum Islam Nusantara Hasyim Asy'ari" [What Is the Gus Dur Room at the Indonesian Islamic Museum K.H Hasyim Asy'ari Like?]. Inilah.com (in Indonesian). 20 March 2024. Archived from the original on 9 March 2026.
- Syafií, Moh.; Agriesta, Dheri (11 November 2021). "Museum KH Hasyim Asy'ari di Tebuireng, Tempat Memahami Perjalanan Islam Masuk ke Indonesia" [KH Hasyim Asy'ari Museum in Tebuireng, A Place to Understand Islam's Spread Through Indonesia]. Kompas (in Indonesian). Archived from the original on 9 March 2026.
- Widyanti, Ni Nyoman Wira Widyanti (17 February 2024). "Ada Ruang Gus Dur di Museum Islam Indonesia KH Hasyim Asy'ari, Seperti Apa?" [There Is a Gus Dur Room at the Indonesian Islamic Museum K.H Hasyim Asy'ari, What Is It Like?]. Kompas. Archived from the original on 9 March 2026.
