= Pondok Modern Darussalam Gontor =

Madrasa in Ponorogo, East Java, Indonesia

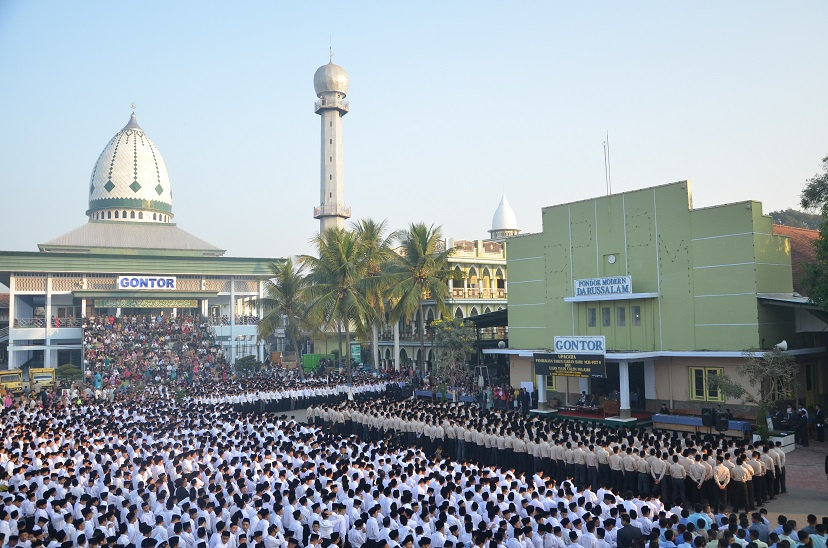
- Gontor, Ponorogo Regency; East Java; Indonesia

Information
- Other name: PMDG
- Type: Modern Pesantren
- Motto: Berbudi Tinggi, Berbadan Sehat, Berpengetahuan Luas, Berpikiran Bebas (Noble Character, Sound Body, Broad Knowledge, Independent Mind)
- Religious affiliation: Islam (modernism)
- Established: 20 September 1926; 100 years ago (12 Rabi' al-Awwal 1345 AH)
- Founder: Ahmad Sahal; Zainuddin Fananie; Imam Zarkasyi
- Principal: KH. Hasan Abdullah Sahal
- Colors: Red, Green, White
- Fight song: "Oh Pondokku" (O my Pondok); Mars Darussalam (Darussalam march)
- Website: www.gontor.ac.id

Pondok Modern Darussalam Gontor Ponorogo (abbreviated as PMDG), also known as Pondok Modern Gontor, or simply Pesantren Gontor, is a pesantren (Indonesian Islamic boarding school) in Ponorogo Regency, East Java, Indonesia. Since its founding in 1926, the pesantren has become famous for the application of discipline, heavy emphasis on foreign languages (Arabic and English), and strong network and cadre of alumni. It also has been an educational institution known for not being specifically tied to any political and social organization. The pesantren is considered the backbone of Muslim society in Indonesia, producing numerous leading figures in the history of Islam in Indonesia.

== History ==
=== Pondok Tegalsari ===
The forerunner of Pondok Modern Darussalam Gontor began in the 18th century when Kyai Ageng Hasan Besari established Pondok Tegalsari in Jetis Ponorogo village of East Java (10 km to the south of the city of Ponorogo). Pondok Tegalsari was well known in its time and visited by thousands of santris (students of pesantren) from various regions in the archipelago. The leadership of the pondok lasted for six generations. In the mid-19th century, during the time of Kyai Hasan Khalifah, Pondok Tegalsari began to decline. At that time, the pondok had a renowned santri named R.M. Sulaiman Djamaluddin, a descendant of the royal family based in Keraton Kasepuhan of Cirebon. Kyai Hasan Khalifah then arranged the marriage of his youngest daughter Oemijatin (known as Nyai Sulaiman) with Sulaiman and they were given the task of establishing a new pesantren and the reformation of the pondok, which in later became a pesantren known as Pondok Gontor Lama.

=== Pondok Gontor Lama (The Old Pondok) ===
Supported by 40 santris brought from Pondok Tegalsari, Kyai R.M. Sulaiman Djamaluddin, and his wife founded Pondok Gontor Lama in a place located ±3 km east of Tegalsari and 11 km to the southeast of the city of Ponorogo. At that time, Gontor was still covered in forest and was often used as a hideout for robbers, criminals, and rogues. The third generation leader of the pondok Kyai Santoso Anom Besari was married to Rr. Sudarmi, the offspring of R.M. Sosrodiningrat (the regent of Madiun). Kyai Santoso Anom died in 1918 at a young age and left 7 children, thus the leadership of Pondok Gontor Lama was cut off. Three of the seven sons and daughters of the Kyai eventually went on to revive the pondok by updating and improving their system and curriculum.

=== Pondok Modern Darussalam Gontor ===
After studying at various traditional pesantrens and modern educational institutions, the three sons of Kyai Santoso Anom finally returned to Gontor on September 20, 1926 (12 Rabiul Awwal 1345) for the commemoration of the Islamic Prophet Muhammad. There they pledged the establishment of Pondok Modern Darussalam Gontor (PMDG). All three were known as Trimurti Founders of Pondok Modern Darussalam Gontor, namely Ahmad Sahal, Zainudin Fananie, and Imam Zarkasyi. On October 12, 1958 (28 Rabi'ul Awwal 1378), Trimurti donated PMDG to the ummah, which was deemed highly as a sacrifice of private property for the benefit of society. The recipient of the mandate was represented by 15 members of Gontor alumni (IKPM) who later came to consist of the Waqf Board of PMDG.

== Organization and administration ==
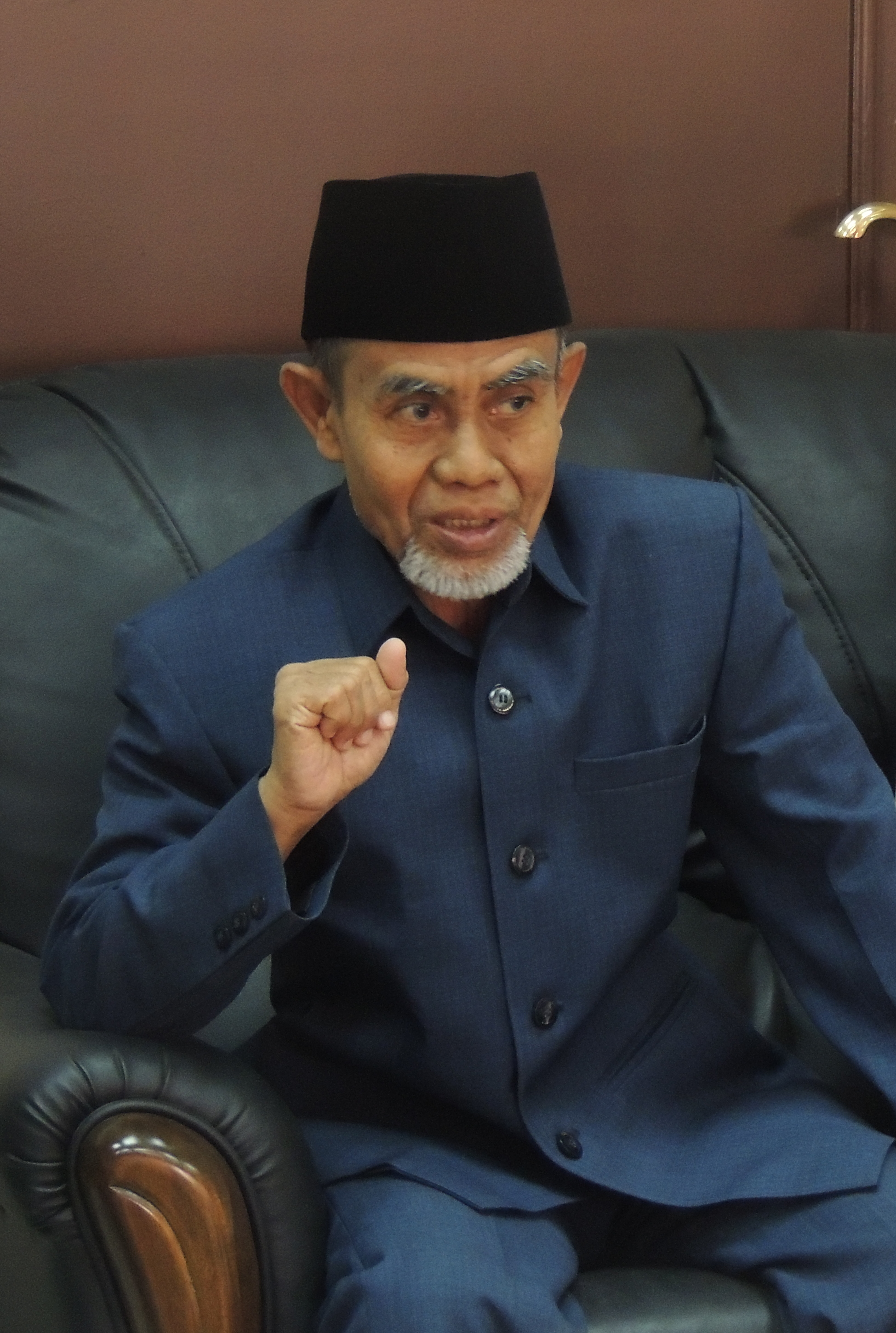
Hasan Abdullah Sahal, the kyai and the chairman of PMDG since 1985.

=== Waqf Board ===
The highest institution in the educational committee of PMDG is the Waqf Board. The board is a 15-member legislative body, responsible for all the governance including the implementation and development of the education in PMDG. Members of the board consist of PMDG alumni who are elected every 5 years.

=== Leadership ===
For daily duties and obligations, the mandate is run by the leadership of PMDG. The leadership of PMDG is the executive body instituted after the death of the founders, chosen by the Waqf Board every 5 years. The chairman of pondok is a mandate of the Waqf Board which possesses the authority to execute the decisions of the board and takes its responsibility. PMDG leaders, in addition to leading the institutions and sections in the educational committee, are also obliged to take care of the santris following the Sunnah.

In his first trial in 1985, after the Trimurti, the Waqf Board established three chiefs of Pondok to lead the post-Trimurti governance of the pesantren. All three are Shoiman Luqmanul Hakim, Abdullah Syukri Zarkasyi, and Hasan Abdullah Sahal. In 1999, with the death of Shoiman Luqmanul Hakim, the Waqf Board appointed Imam Badri as his successor. In 2006, with the death of Imam Badri, he was succeeded by Syamsul Hadi Abdan. In 2020, with the death of Syamsul Hadi Abdan and Abdullah Syukri Zarkasyi, the Waqf board appointed Amal Fathullah Zarkasyi and Akrim Mariyat as their successors. In 2026, Amal Fathullah Zarkasyi died. Currently, the leadership of PMDG is held by Hasan Abdullah Sahal (since 1985) and Akrim Mariyat (since 2020).

== Educational institution ==
=== Kulliyatul Mu'allimin / Mu'allimat Al-Islamiyyah ===
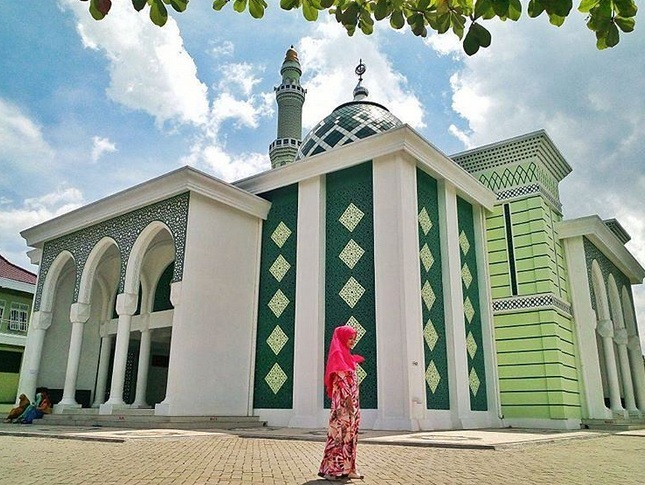
Gontor Putri campus in Mantingan, Ngawi, East Java, Indonesia

Kulliyatul Mu'allimin Al-Islamiyyah (abbr. KMI; Arabic: كلية المعلمين الإسلامية, trans. Kullīyat al-Muʿallimīn al-Islāmīyah; English: Islamic Teachers College) is an educational institution for male santris, with a learning period of 4 to 6 years, covering the secondary educational level. KMI was established on 19 December 1936, after the 10th anniversary of PMDG. There is also Kulliyatul Mu'allimat Al-Islamiyyah Pondok Gontor Putri (abbr. KMI; Arabic: كلية المعلّمات الإسلامية; trans. Kullīyat al-Muʿallimāt al-Islāmīyah; English: Islamic Teachers College for Women) which is the equivalent of KMI for female santris. According to the decision of the Waqf Board, on 7 Rabiul Awwal 1411, KMI Gontor Putri was officially established in Mantingan, Ngawi Regency. This pesantren for women is 100 km from the main area of PMDG. The curriculum and learning program of Gontor Putri is similar to KMI, with adjustments to local content and emphasis on training specifically for female santris.

=== University of Darussalam ===
UNIDA Gontor campus in Siman, Ponorogo, East Java, Indonesia

The University of Darussalam (UNIDA) is a pesantren college where all the students are in campus dormitories under the guidance of the rector (as kyai). UNIDA was established on 17 November 1963 (1 Rajab 1383) by Trimurti and managed under the Waqf Board. Currently, Hamid Fahmy Zarkasyi serves as the rector since 2020. Below are the faculties and its courses existing under UNIDA:

- Faculty of Ushuluddin: Comparative religion, Aqeedah and Islamic philosophy, Qur'anic tafsir
- Faculty of Tarbiyah: Islamic religious education, Arabic language education
- Faculty of Sharia: Comparative law, Islamic economic jurisprudence
- Faculty of Economics and Management: Islamic economics, Business management
- Faculty of Humanities: International Relations, Communication studies
- Faculty of Health Sciences: Pharmacy, Nutrition, Occupational safety and health
- Faculty of Science and Technology: Informatics engineering, Agrotechnology, Agricultural industrial technology

== Academics ==
=== Orientation ===
The scholarly orientation at PMDG is aimed at forming a person with devout Islamic faith and morals who can serve the community at the same time. PMDG proclaimed that "education is more important than teaching". There are four major outlines of the direction and purpose of education at PMDG, which are education for the community, simplicity, no partying, and demanding knowledge of God. As a modern pesantren, the curriculum of PMDG covers both traditional Islamic educational and secular educational materials.

=== Foreign partnerships ===
Pondok Modern Darussalam Gontor aims to reflect the leading international Islamic educational institutions, and it has established partnerships with the four educational institutions that heavily influenced the school orientation. The main partnership is with Al-Azhar University of Cairo, Egypt, which has a vast waqf and scholarly resources, which can send scholars across the world and provide scholarships for thousands of students from various parts of the world to study at the university. The other institutions are Aligarh Muslim University in India, Shanggit in Mauritania, and Santiniketan in India.

== Notable alumni ==
- Abu Bakar Bashir - leader of Jamaah Ansharut Tauhid
- Ahmad Fuadi - novelist who wrote a fictionalized account of his experience at PMDG (named "Madani Pesantren" in the book) in his novel The Land of 5 Towers
- Bachtiar Nasir - da'i
- Din Syamsuddin - 14th chairman of Muhammadiyah and the 6th chairman of Majelis Ulama Indonesia
- Emha Ainun Nadjib - poet and Islamic intellectual
- Hasanain Juaini - environmentalist and the winner of Ramon Magsaysay Award
- Hasyim Muzadi - 4th chairman of Nahdlatul Ulama
- Hidayat Nur Wahid - speaker of the People's Consultative Assembly during 2004–2009, and the leader of Prosperous Justice Party during 2000-2004
- Idham Chalid - the 2nd chairman of Nahdlatul Ulama, National Hero of Indonesia
- Lukman Hakim Saifuddin - former Minister of Religious Affairs
- Mohammad Idris - 3rd mayor of Depok
- Muhammad Muzammil Basyuni - the ambassador to Syria served during the Yudhoyono administration
- Nurcholish Madjid - Islamic intellectual

== Bibliography ==
- Lukens-Bull, Ronald A. (2001). "Two Sides of the Same Coin: Modernity and Tradition in Islamic Education in Indonesia". Anthropology & Education Quarterly. 32 (3). Wiley: 350–372. doi:10.1525/aeq.2001.32.3.350. JSTOR 3195992.
- Gaus, A. F. Ahmad (2010). Api Islam Nurcholish Madjid : jalan hidup seorang visioner. Jakarta: Penerbit Buku Kompas. ISBN 978-979-709-514-7. OCLC 670325190.
