= Kota santri =

Epithet for a region of religious importance in Indonesia

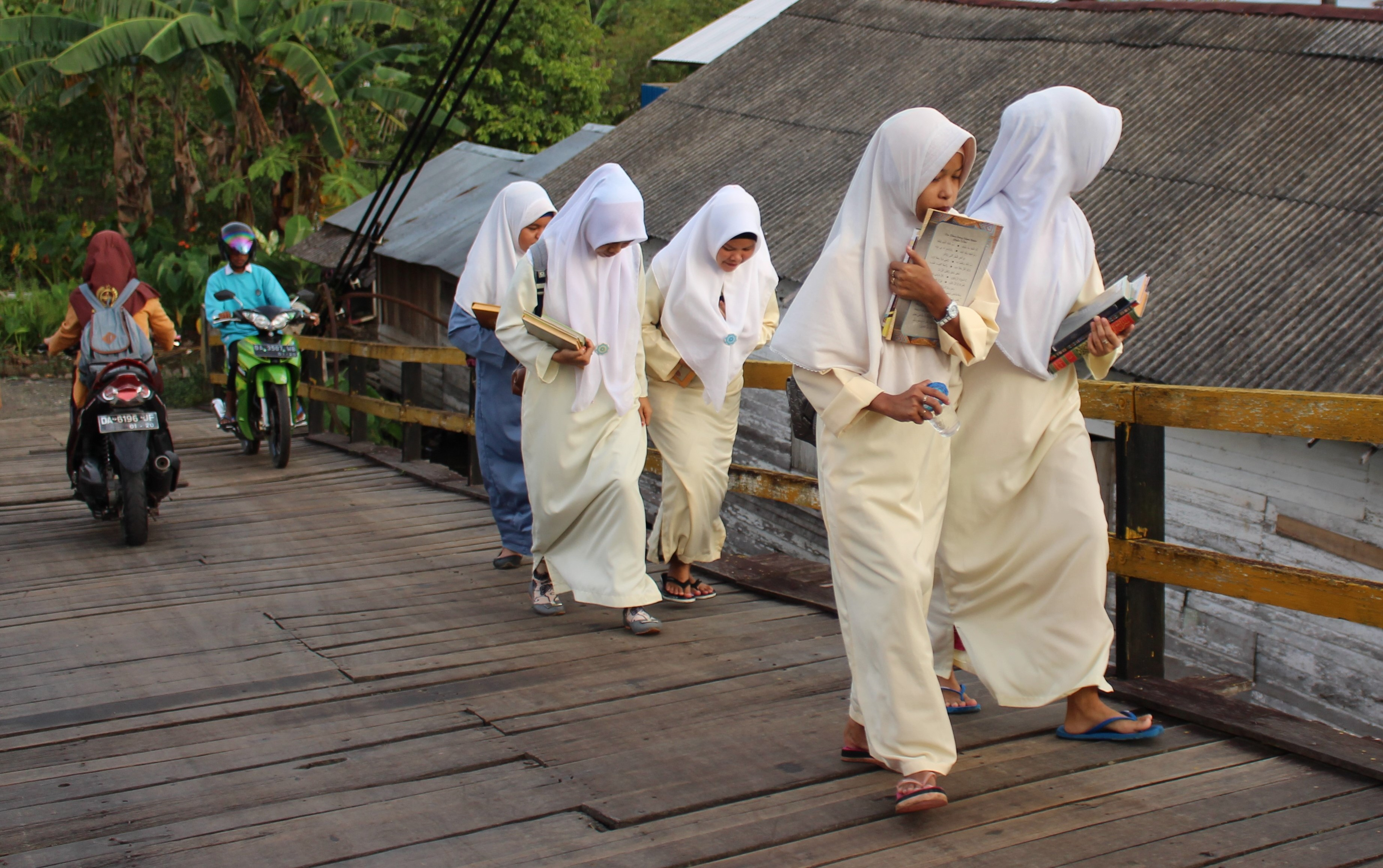
A group of santri in Banjar, a place known as kota santri

Kota santri ("city of santri" or "city of pious people") is an epithet used in Indonesia, predominantly in Java, given to a region historically important in the context of Islamic education. The term santri generally means a Muslim student who studies at pesantren, an Islamic boarding school indigenous to the Indonesian archipelago.

In the modern days, the term kota santri was popularized by a folk song sung by a qasidah modern musical group Nasida Ria from Semarang.

== Concept ==
The concept of santri was historically used to designate a Javanese societal class (aliran) that observes orthodox Sunni Islam and espouses a strong Muslim identity. Today, the term santri is mostly used to call a Muslim student who studies at pesantren. Pesantren, or pondok pesantren, is a traditional Islamic educational institution in Indonesia that employs a boarding school system and generally covers from the elementary to middle school years. The cities and regions renowned as kota santri are generally characterized by the historical concentration of pesantren, in addition to mosques or the graves of venerated ulamas. The term kota santri is often emphasized by the cities and regions to promote religious tourism.

The term kota santri is predominantly used for the cities and regions in Java, especially East Java. (Note: Both terms pesantren and santri are traditionally used in Java, while other ethnic groups have different terms for the indigenous Islamic schools.)

== List of regions renowned as kota santri ==
The list is in alphabetical order.

- Banjar, South Kalimantan

The Banjar region, especially the city of Martapura, is known for Islamic education, with famous institutions such as Pondok Pesantren Darussalam Martapura. The city is also known as the "Veranda to Mecca" for historically being the point of departure to Hajj. The Great Mosque of Al-Karomah, a historical mosque first established in 1863, is a landmark of the city.

- Bireuen, Aceh

Bireuen Regency was officially declared as kota santri by Nova Iriansyah, the governor of Aceh, and Muzakkar A. Gani, the regent of Bireuen, on the National Santri Day on October 22, 2020. The regency has the largest number of pesantren in Aceh with approximately 51,000 students enrolling in pesantren.

- Gresik, East Java

Gresik is home to two of the most important propagators of Islam in Indonesia, Sunan Giri and Syekh Maulana Malik Ibrahim. In addition to many pesantren schools, the city is known as the center of Qur'anic education with many educational parks, environment, and communities dedicated to it.

- Jombang, East Java

Jombang is known for prestigious pesantren schools, including Pondok Pesantren Teburing, Pondok Pesantren Denanyar, Pondok Pesantren Tambakberas, Pondok Pesantren Attahdzib, and Pondok Pesantren Darul Ulum of Rejoso. The city has produced many renowned Islamic figures, including the former President of Indonesia Abdurrahman Wahid who studied at Tambakberas and the former Vice President of Indonesia Ma'ruf Amin who studied at Tebuireng. The pesantren of Tebuireng is also known as the school established by Hasyim Asy'ari, the founder of Nahdlatul Ulama (NU), the largest Islamic organization in the world.

- Kendal, Central Java

Kendal in Central Java, especially the district of Kaliwungu, has long held the status of a model city for Muslim students in Indonesia. There are dozens of Islamic boarding schools with thousands of students in them. The average district in Kendal has at least 10 pesantren schools. In the city of Jabal, there are graves of early Muslim propagators such as Kyai Guru which have become a destination of pilgrimage.

- Kediri, East Java

The city of Kediri is known for Pondok Pesantren Lirboyo, one of the most prestigious pesantren schools and among the strongholds of NU.

- Kudus, Central Java
- Pasuruan, East Java
- Pekalongan, Central Java
- Ponorogo, East Java

Ponorogo is known for prestigious pesantren, including Pondok Modern Arrisalah, Pondok Darul Huda Mayak, Pondok Tegalsari, Pondok Putri Mawaddah, Pondok Walisongo Ngabar, and Pondok Modern Darussalam Gontor. Pondok Modern Darussalam Gontor is one of the most prestigious pesantren schools in Indonesia. Pondok Gontor has become famous for the application of discipline, heavy emphasis of foreign languages (Arabic and English), and strong network and cadre of alumni. It also has been an educational institution known for not specifically tied to any political and social organization. The pesantren is considered a backbone of Muslim society in Indonesia, producing numerous leading figures of the history of Islam in Indonesia.

- Serang, Banten
- Situbondo, East Java

Situbondo is known for Pondok Pesantren Salafiyah Syafi'iyah Sukorejo, one of the most prestigious pesantren schools in Indonesia.

- Sukabumi, West Java

Sukabumi is a destination of saint veneration, with five makams (saint's tomb) and a well that is considered holy. There is a monument called Asmaul Husna Monument in the city center as an icon of the city of Sukabumi, which celebrates the Names of God in Islam.

- Tasikmalaya, West Java

Fuad Mukhlis, the head of the Pesantren Care Forum of Tasikmalaya, stated that the Tasikmalaya region has hundreds of pesantren schools, 93% of which follow the teaching of Sunni Islam espoused by NU. Other source states that there are more than 800 pesantren schools in Tasikmalaya Regency. The region once attempted to initiate a sharia bylaw that declares the city as kota santri, but this was retracted after met with controversy and rectified as the Bylaw of Values of Religious Communities.
