= Jombang =

Jombang may refer to the following places in Indonesia:

- Jombang Regency, a regency of East Java
  - Jombang, Jombang, a district of Jombang Regency
- Jombang, Jember, a district of Jember Regency, East Java
- Jombang, Cilegon, a district of the city of Cilegon, in Banten province, Indonesia
