= Kitab kuning =

Indonesian Islamic Seminary Curriculum

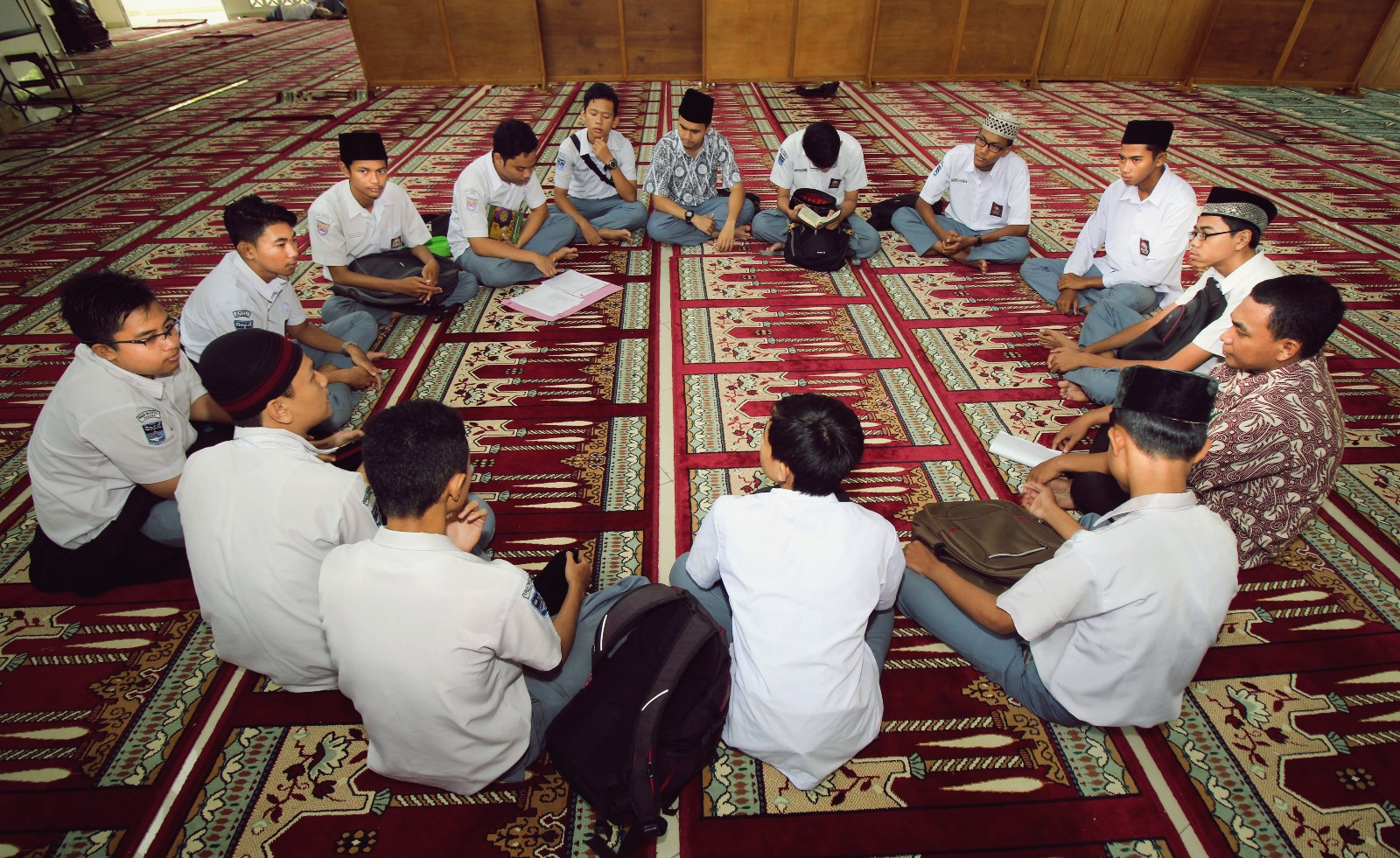
A mentoring session in pesantren. Kitab kuning is often employed and translated during such activities.

In Indonesian Islamic education, Kitab kuning (lit. 'yellow book') refers to the traditional set of the Islamic texts used by the educational curriculum of the Islamic seminary in Indonesia, especially within the madrasahs and pesantrens. Coverage of kitab kuning extends from the principles of Islamic jurisprudence (usul al-fiqh), Islamic creeds (aqidah), Islamic ethics (akhlaq), science of Islamic mysticism (tasawwuf), sciences of Arabic language, science of Qur'anic recitations (tajwid), hadith studies, tafsir, Qur'anic studies to social sciences. It is also known as kitab gundul (lit: bare book) due to the content in the Arabic language does not employ vowel marks (harakat), unlike the Qur'an. Therefore, mastering of kitab kuning is considered to require a substantial amount of time. Collections of the Islamic texts employed as kitab kuning may vary, depending on the type of institution, individual schools, kyai, and region, with certain prerequisite materials such as Tafsir al-Jalalayn.

== History ==
Most of the Islamic scholarly manuscripts produced after the Rashidun Caliphate were written in Arabic without employing harakat in general, unlike the Qur'an which was specifically aided by Arabic diacritics for non-Arab Muslims. As for the people who mastered the rules of Arabic grammar, they weren't required to employ harakat in their readings. In Indonesia, the religious texts that read by these people were then specifically designated as kitab gundul in order to distinguish them from the book written with the diacritical aids.

Kitab gundul was soon referred as kitab kuning, which means yellow book, because mostly the books were published on yellow paper. This is because yellow paper were considered more comfortable and easy to read in a dim condition. When lighting was limited in the past, mainly in the villages, the santris (students of pesantren) had to get accustomed to studying at night with minimal lighting, and books made of yellow paper had reduced the stress. Today, although access to lighting has become normal, some books are still produced on yellow paper. There are other etymological reasons, including the reference to the aged books turning into more yellowish and darker color due to the exposure of lignin to air and sunlight, and the reference to the candle light putting out yellow shades. Today, kitab kunings are mostly converted into electronic book files, such as chm and pdf, and distributed through the computer software namely Maktabah Syamila among santris of modern pesantrens.
