= Nasida Ria =

Indonesian qasidah girl group

- Origin: Semarang, Indonesia
- Genres: Qasidah modern
- Years active: 1975–present
- Members: Rien Jamain, Hamidah, Nurjanah, Nadhiroh, Afuwah, Nurhayati, Sofiyatun, Thowiyah, Uswatun Khasanah, Titik Mukaromah, Nazla Zain, Alfiatul

Nasida Ria is an Indonesian qasidah modern musical group consisting of 9 women from Semarang, Central Java. Nasida Ria was led by H. Mudrikah Zain but is now managed by Choliq Zain. Established in 1975, it is one of the oldest qasidah modern musical groups in Indonesia.

== History ==
In 1975, Nasida Ria was founded in Semarang, Central Java, by HM Zain, a teacher of qira'at (how to read the Qur'an); Zain had previously had experience with the mixed-gender group Assabab. He assembled nine of his students for the band: Mudrikah Zain, Mutoharoh, Rien Jamain, Umi Kholifah, Musyarofah, Nunung, Alfiyah, Kudriyah, and Nur Ain. Initially, the group only used the rebana to provide music. Later, then-mayor of Semarang and fan of the group Iman Soeparto Tjakrajoeda donated an organ to aid the group, which also facilitated their musical studies. The group later acquired a bass, violin, and guitar.

Nasida Ria's debut album, Alabaladil Makabul, was produced three years afterwards and marketed nationally by Ira Puspita Records. Their songs were entirely based in dawah and drew influences from Arabic music. The following three albums were similarly themed and included much Arabic chanting. After a suggestion from kyai Ahmad Buchori Masruri that the songs would be more effective if entirely in Indonesian, Nasida Ria changed its style. Masruri also contributed songs under the pseudonym of Abu Ali Haidar.

Nasida Ria's new style was shown to be popular, with several of the group's songs, including "Pengantin Baru" ("Newlyweds"), "Tahun 2000" ("Year 2000"), "Jilbab Putih" ("White Hijab"), "Anakku" ("My Child"), and "Kota Santri" ("City of Santri"), gaining much airplay in both rural villages and urban areas. They also appeared on national television and toured the country.

In 1988, Nasida Ria performed in Malaysia to celebrate the Islamic New Year on 1 Muharram. Six years later, they performed in Berlin, Germany in Die Garten des Islam (The Islamic Cultural Exhibition) at the invitation of the Haus der Kulturen der Welt. In July 1996, they returned to Germany for the Heimatklange Festival, performing in Berlin, Mülheim, and Düsseldorf.

After 2000, the group saw less success. Several members were replaced, having died or left to further other goals.

Nasida Ria is now headquartered in Semarang. The current manager is Choliq Zain, son of their original manager.

== Style ==
According to Suara Merdeka, a Semarang-based newspaper, Nasida Ria mixes classic Arabic styles with modern, Western instruments. Songwriters for the group often adapt traditional Arabic rhythms. Their songs, although involving dawah, also touch on subjects like the press, justice, environmentalism, disasters, gambling, and warfare; Masruri notes that even songs with worldly themes have their root in the Qur'an.

== Awards and recognition ==
Nasida Ria has won several awards, including an award from the Islamic Cultural Center in 1989. Their song "Perdamaian" ("Peace"), written by Masruri, was a "radio staple" during the Eid ul-Fitr season for several years and was covered by rock band Gigi on their 2005 album Raihlah Kemenangan (Reach for Victory). "Kota Santri" has been covered by Krisdayanti and her ex-husband Anang.

The Indonesian newspaper Republika notes that Nasida Ria was followed by other qasidah modern acts in the 1990s, including Haddad Alwi and Sulis, while in Malaysia the genre has been popularized by groups such as Raihan, Rabbani, Hijjaz, and Saujana.

== Discography ==
As of July 2011, Nasida Ria has released 35 albums, including two Arabic-language ones. This includes 350 songs.

Contributing artist

- The Rough Guide to the Music of Indonesia (2000, World Music Network)
