= Yaqowiyu =

Traditional Javanese religious festival

Yaqowiyu is a traditional Javanese religious festival held in Jatinom, Klaten Regency, Central Java. The festival is held every Sapar of the Javanese calendar, and is often called Saparan.

During Yaqowiyu, a traditional cake called apem which is round snack made of rice flour is distributed, and thousands of people fight for the cake. Thousands of apems will be distributed from a platform established in the mosque located in the funeral complex of Ki Ageng Gribig.

Traditional belief tells that apem will bring fortune for people who succeed in getting it. The festival is a prominent example of adat which is a syncretism between Islamic belief and vernacular customary traditions.

Yaqowiyu was first introduced by Ki Ageng Gribig, who is believed to be the descendant of Brawijaya, after his return from the hajji pilgrimage in Mecca. The name Yaqowiyu comes from the part of the Arabic dua (supplication prayer), yaa qowiyyu, yaa aziz, qowwina wal muslimiin, yaa qowiyyu warzuqna wal muslimiin which is believed to be the dua for power.

== Gallery ==
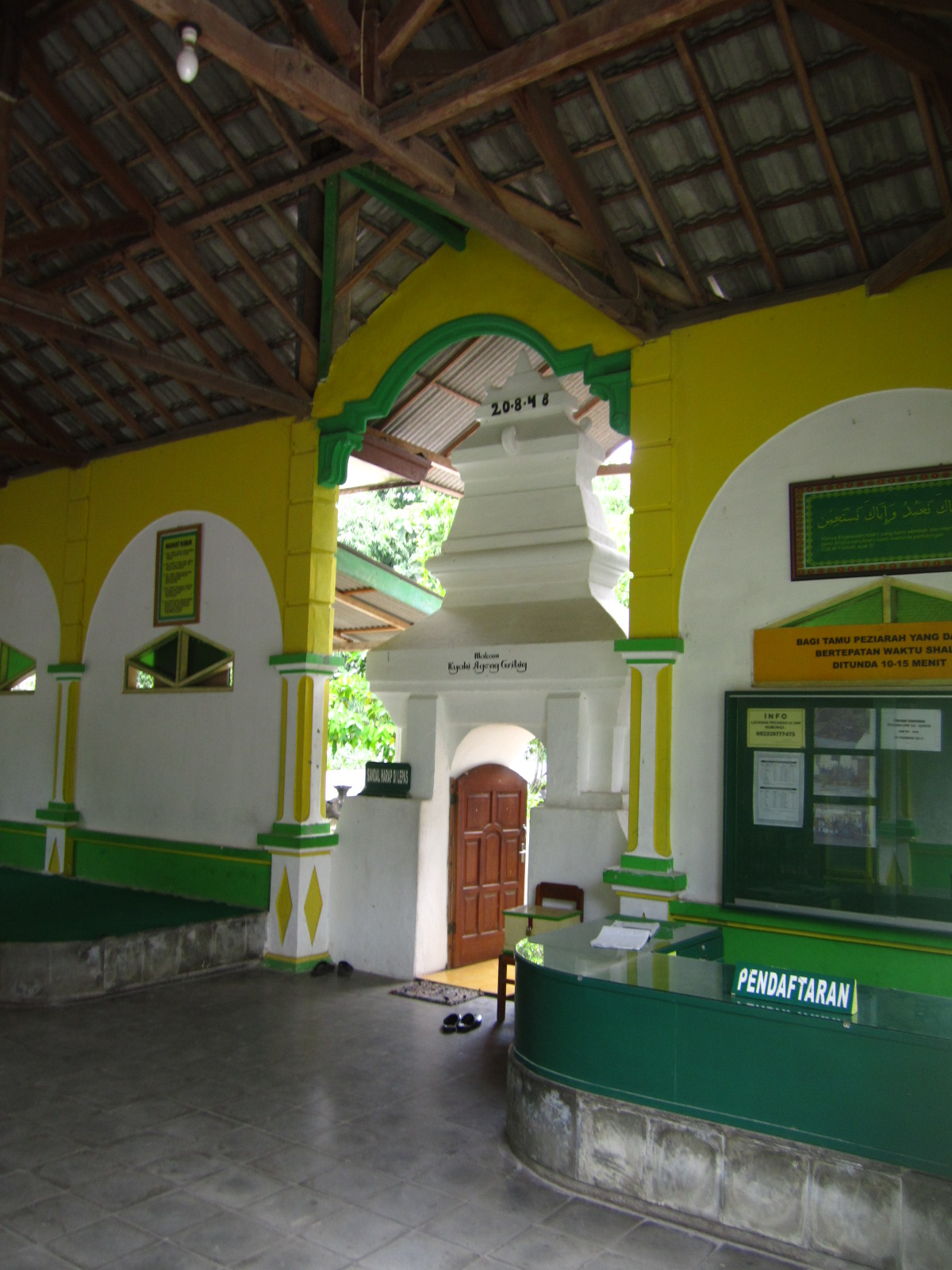
Entrance to the funerary complex

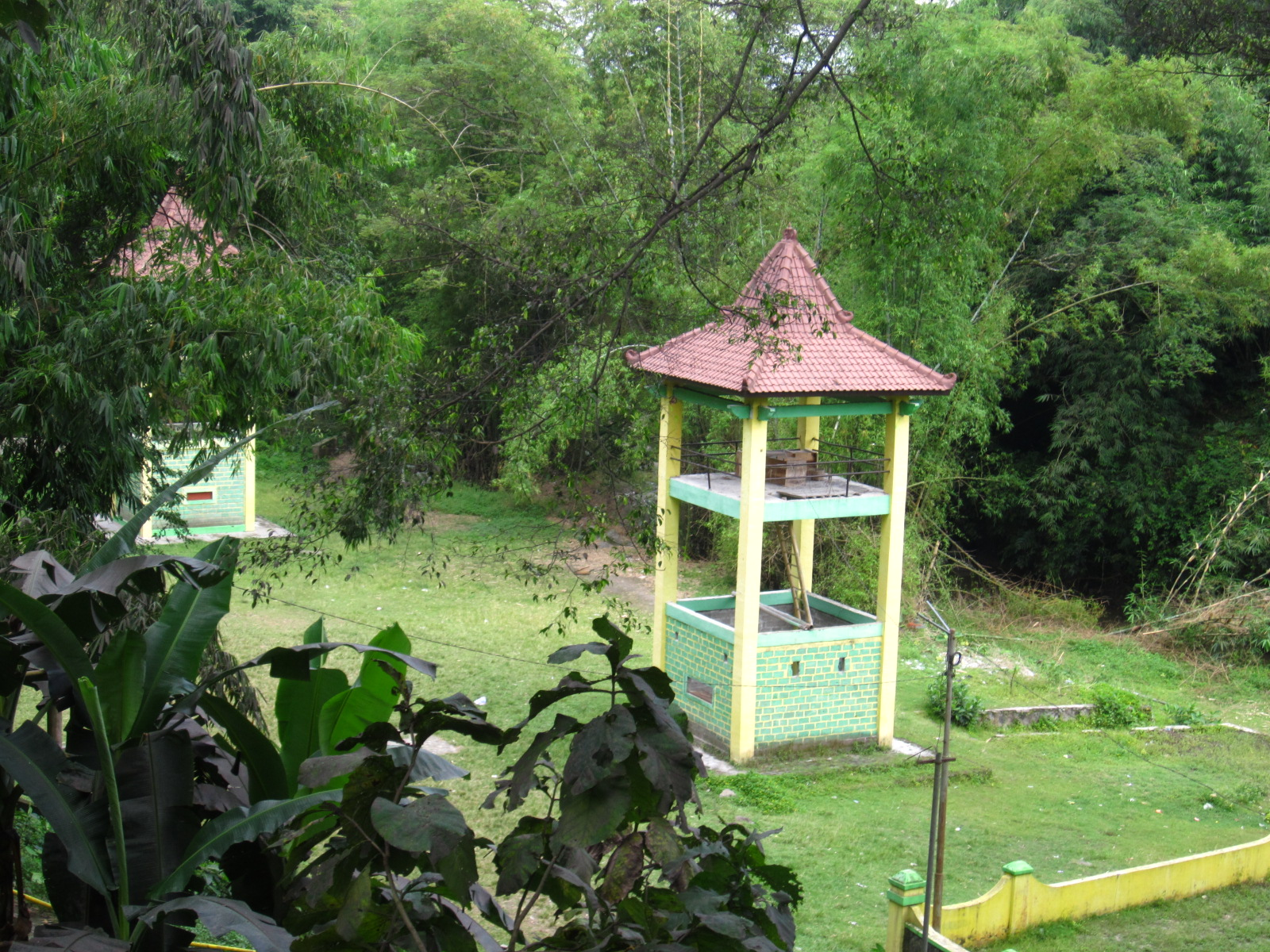
Platform to distribute apem
