= Muhammad Murtadho Dimyathi =

Indonesian Muslim cleric

Abuya Kyai Hajji Muhammad Murtadho bin Dimyathi al-Bantani
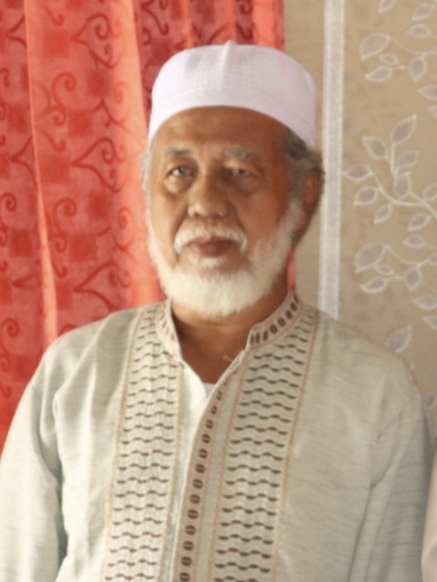
- Abuya Murtadho in 2021
- Title: Abuya

Personal life
- Born: Muhammad Murtadho; January 19, 1958 (age 68) Pandeglang Regency
- Home town: Pandeglang Regency
- Parents: Abuya K.H. Muhammad Dimyathi (father); Nyai Hj. Ashmah Jasir (mother)
- Era: Modern era
- Main interests: Quran; hadith; tafsir; qira'at; fiqh; tasawwuf
- Other name: Abuya Murtadho
- Relatives: Ahmad Muhtadi Dimyathi (older brother)

Religious life
- Religion: Islam
- Denomination: Sunni
- Institute: Pondok Pesantren Cidahu
- Jurisprudence: Shafi‘i
- Tariqa: Shadhili
- Creed: Ashʿari

Abuya Kyai Hajji Muhammad Murtadho bin Dimyathi al-Bantani (Arabic: محمد مرتضى بن دمياطي البنتني, romanized: Muḥammad Murtaḍā bin Dimyāṭī al-Bantanī, Arabic pronunciation: [muħammad mur'tadˤaː bin dimjaːtˤiː al-bantaniː]; born January 19, 1958) or better known as Abuya Murtadho is an Indonesian Muslim cleric from Banten. He is an influential Bantenese cleric whose character is often used as a reference for politicians to visit his residence, including figures from political parties, the police, high-ranking institutions, even presidential and vice-presidential candidates.

Together with his older brother Abuya Ahmad Muhtadi Dimyathi, Murtadho was one of the caregivers at the Islamic boarding school founded by his father, Pondok Pesantren Cidahu, Pandeglang Regency. His father, Abuya Muhammad Dimyathi, founded the Islamic boarding school in Cidahu in 1963 after conducting scientific and religious studies with several ulama in Java and surrounding areas. Abuya Dimyathi later died on October 3 2003, while the management of the Islamic boarding school was then handed over to his children, including Murtadho.

== Biography ==
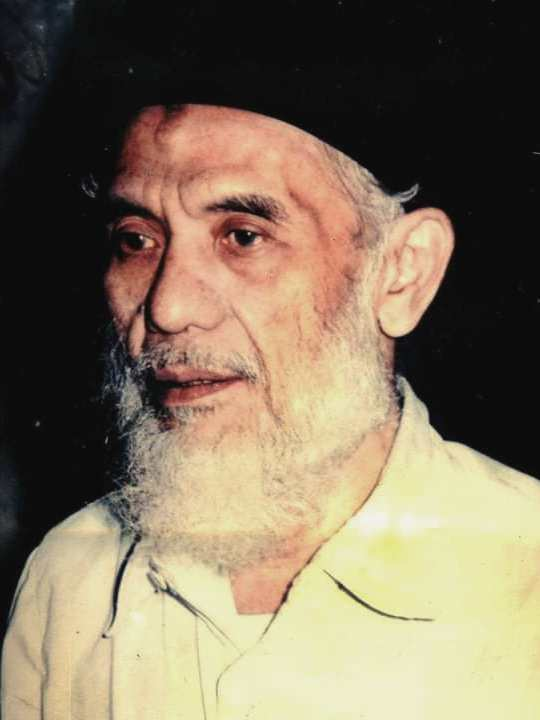
Abuya Dimyathi c. 1990s, father of Murtadho

Murtadho was born in Cidahu Village, Cadasari Sub-district, Pandeglang Regency with the birth name Muhammad Murtadho. Murtadho was born when his father, Abuya Muhammad Dimyathi, was studying at the Pondok Pesantren Bendo, Pare, Kediri Regency led by K.H. Khozin Al-Muhajir. Abuya Dimyathi left for Bendo in 1957, a year before Murtadho was born. Before leaving, Abuya Dimyathi then entrusted the name Muhammad Murtadho to his wife, Nyai Hj. Ashmah Jasir. At that time, his wife was pregnant with Murtadho for 3–4 months.

Murtadho family's ancestors were ethnically mixed blood between Bantenese people and Hadhrami Arabs from the noble family of the Banten Sultanate. His father was a Muslim cleric who founded the Pondok Pesantren Cidahu (Raudhatul Ulum Cidahu Islamic Boarding School).

Murtadho is the second child of six siblings. He also has two half-siblings from his father's marriage to Nyai Hj. Dalalah Nawawi from Yogyakarta. His siblings are Ahmad Muhtadi, Abdul Aziz Fakhruddin, Ahmad Muntaqo, Musfiroh, and Ahmad Muqatil and his half-siblings are Qayyimah and Ahmad Mujtaba.

Murtadho received his basic religious education from his mother, Nyai Hj. Ashmah Jasir, who is the daughter of a cleric named Abuya K.H. Jasir Abdul Halim al-Bantani.
