= Ahmad Muhtadi Dimyathi =

Indonesian Muslim cleric (born 1953)

Abuya Kyai Hajji Ahmad Muhtadi bin Dimyathi al-Bantani
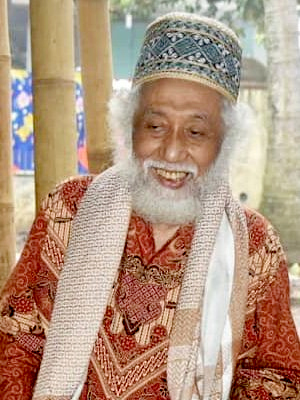
- Abuya Muhtadi in 2018
- Title: Abuya

Personal life
- Born: Ahmad Muhtadi; December 26, 1953 (age 72) Pandeglang Regency
- Home town: Pandeglang Regency
- Parents: Abuya K.H. Muhammad Dimyathi (father); Nyai Hj. Ashmah Jasir (mother)
- Era: Modern era
- Main interests: Quran; hadith; tafsir; qira'at; fiqh; tasawwuf
- Known for: Shafiite mufti of Banten
- Other name: Abuya Muhtadi
- Occupation: Leader of Pondok Pesantren Cidahu (2003–present); Mustasyar (adviser) of Nahdlatul Ulama (2015–present); Rais Aam (general chairman) of Majelis Mudzakaroh Muhtadi Cidahu Banten (M3CB)
- Relatives: Muhammad Murtadho Dimyathi (younger brother)

Religious life
- Religion: Islam
- Denomination: Sunni
- Institute: Pondok Pesantren Cidahu
- Jurisprudence: Shafi‘i
- Tariqa: Shadhili
- Creed: Ashʿari

Abuya Kyai Hajji Ahmad Muhtadi bin Dimyathi al-Bantani (Arabic: أحمد مهتدي بن دمياطي البنتني, romanized: ʾAḥmad Muhtadī bin Dimyāṭī al-Bantanī, Arabic pronunciation: [ˈ(ʔ)aħmad muhtadiː bin dimjaːtˤiː al-bantaniː]; born December 26, 1953) or better known as Abuya Muhtadi is an Indonesian Muslim cleric from Banten. He is known as one of the Muslim scholars close to President Joko Widodo. At the Zikir Kebangsaan (nationality dhikr) which was first held by the Indonesian government in the Merdeka Palace in 2017, Muhtadi was one of the religious leaders invited by the president. In the 2019 Indonesian presidential election, he supported a friend who was also a Muslim cleric from Banten, Ma'ruf Amin, who became the running mate of incumbent presidential candidate, Joko Widodo. Even so, in the 2014 Indonesian presidential election, he supported Prabowo Subianto as a candidate for Indonesian President and instructed his students to vote for Subianto.

As the eldest child, after the death of his father, Muhammad Dimyathi al-Bantani, Muhtadi continued the leadership of the Pondok Pesantren Cidahu (Raudhatul Ulum Cidahu Islamic Boarding School) in 2003. In carrying out his duties as leader of the pesantren, Muhtadi was assisted by his several younger siblings, including Muhammad Murtadlo Dimyathi, to nurture and provide learning to student. In addition, Muhtadi is also the general chairman of the Islamic dawah institution named Majelis Muzakaroh Muhtadi Cidahu Banten (M3CB) headquartered at Pondok Pesantren Cidahu, Cadasari, Pandeglang Regency.

In the Islamic organizational realm, Muhtadi was active in Nahdlatul Ulama as the mustasyar (adviser) of the Executive Board of Nahdlatul Ulama for the period 2015–2020 along with several religious leaders and other scholars such as Maimun Zubair, Mustofa Bisri, Muhammad Luthfi bin Yahya, Muhammad Jusuf Kalla, and Awang Faroek Ishak. In addition, Muhtadi was also known to be close to the Islamic Defenders Front at the beginning of its establishment in Banten. In fact, he always oversaw the proceedings of the Cikeusik attack case trial carried out by the mass of the Islamic Defenders Front against Ahmadiyya worshipers in Cikeusik sub-district, Pandeglang, in 2011. In the political field, Muhtadi was known to be close to the Islamic party formed by Abdurrahman Wahid, the National Awakening Party.

In 2013, through the Majelis Muzakaroh Muhtadi Cidahu Banten, Muhtadi issued an haram fatwa to Hizbut Tahrir Indonesia (HTI) and stated that the desire and efforts of the HTI group to eliminate Pancasila as a foundational philosophical theory of the Indonesian state were a form of rebellion.

== Biography ==
=== Early life ===
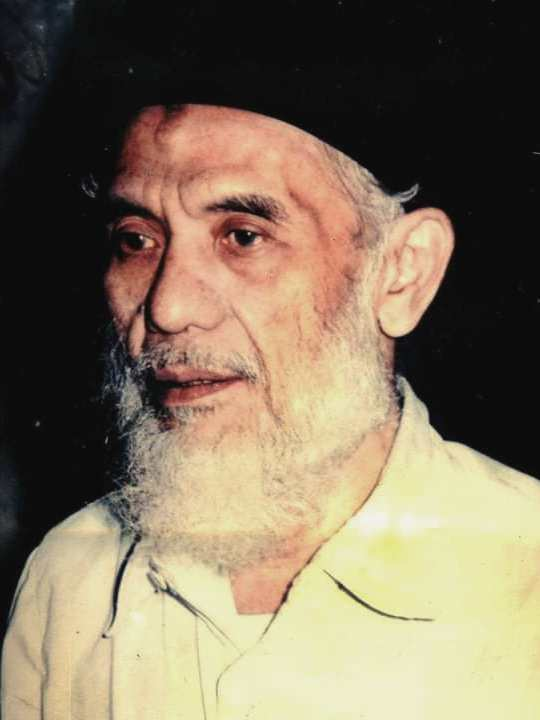
Abuya Dimyathi c. 1990s, father of Muhtadi

Muhtadi was born in Cidahu Village, Cadasari Sub-district, Pandeglang Regency with the birth name Ahmad Muhtadi. His family's ancestors were ethnically mixed blood between Bantenese people and Hadhrami Arabs from the noble family of the Banten Sultanate. His father was a Muslim cleric who founded the Pondok Pesantren Cidahu (Raudhatul Ulum Cidahu Islamic Boarding School) named Abuya Muhammad Dimyathi al-Bantani. Abuya (senior kyai) is an honorary title of the Bantenese people that is pinned to highly knowledgeable clerics who are the teachers of the ulama in the Banten region and the diaspora of the Bantenese descendants, such as West Java, Jakarta, and Lampung. His mother was named Nyai Hajjah Asma', like other housewives who were the wives of a kyai, she cared for and provided basic education to her children before then studying with their father, Abuya Dimyathi. Hajjah Asma' is the daughter of a Muslim cleric named Kyai Hajji Abdul Halim al-Makky.

Muhtadi is the oldest child who has five siblings, four boys and one girl. He also has two half-siblings from another mother, the result of his father's marriage to a woman named Hajjah Dalalah. His siblings were Muhammad Murtadlo, Abdul Aziz Fakruddin, Ahmad Muntaqo, Musfiroh, and Ahmad Muqatil. While his half-siblings named Qayyimah and Ahmad Mujtaba.

== Views ==
Regnal titles
Preceded by Muhammad Dimyathi al-Bantani	Leader of Pondok Pesantren Cidahu; 2003–present	Incumbent
