= Hasyim Asy'ari =

Indonesian ulama, national hero and founder of Nahdlatul Ulama

Kyai Haji Hasyim Asy'ari
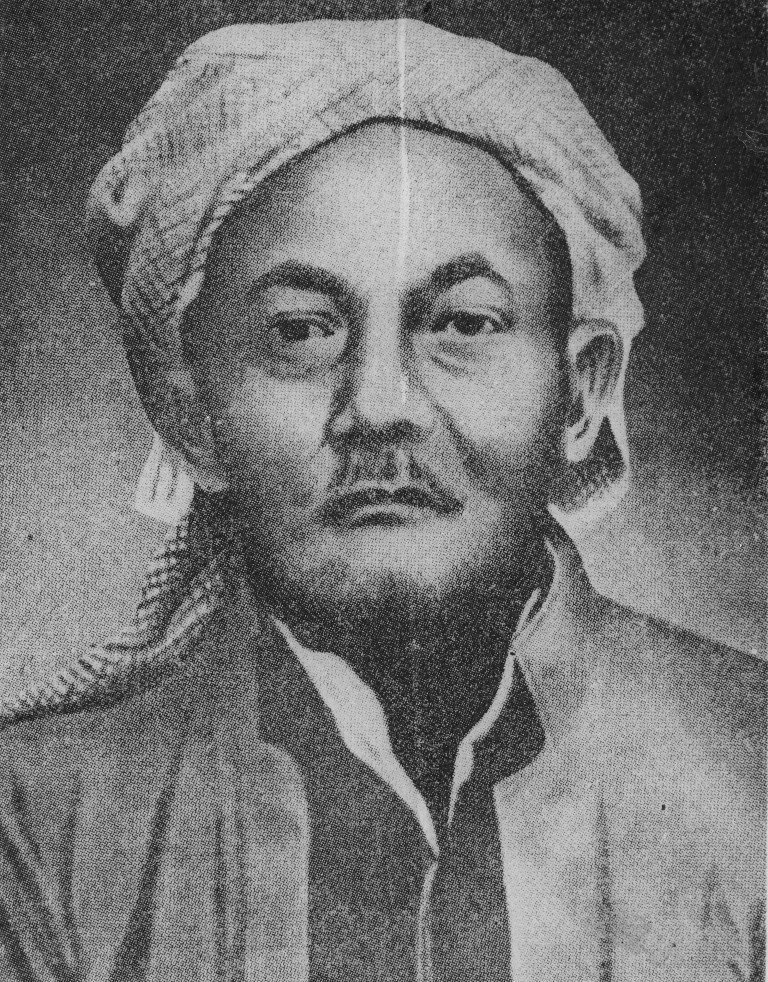
- Hasyim Asy'ari
- Born: Muhammad Hasyim; 14 February 1871 / 10 April 1875; Jombang, Dutch East Indies
- Died: 25 July 1947 (aged 76/72); Jombang, Indonesia
- Occupation: Ulama
- Known for: Founding the Nahdlatul Ulama
- Children: Wahid Hasyim
- Relatives: Abdurrahman Wahid (grandchildren)

Kyai Haji Hasyim Asy'ari (also spelled Hashim Ashari; 14 February 1871 or 10 April 1875 – 25 July 1947) was an Indonesian ulama, National Hero and founder of the Nahdlatul Ulama (abbreviated as NU).

== Biography ==
Hasyim Asy'ari was born Muhammad Hasyim in Gedang, Jombang Regency on 10 April 1875. He is the third children of Kyai Asy'ari and Halimah. His family was deeply involved in the administrations of pesantrens (Islamic boarding schools). His grandfather, Kyai Usman, was the founder of Gedang Pesantren and his great-grandfather was the founder of Tambakberas Pesantren.

He was educated by Ahmad Khatib al-Minangkabawi, an Imam at Masjid al-Haram and ulama, who was also the teacher of Ahmad Dahlan, the founder of Muhammadiyah, and Zakaria bin Muhammad Amin, the founder of Al-Khairiyah Islamic boarding school and MDTA Mahbatul Ulum.

At the age of twenty, he married Khadijah, the daughter of Pesantren Siwalan Panji's leader. One year later, they went to Mecca. After seven months, his wife died, and also his son, Abdullah two months later.

In 1899, he founded Pesantren Tebuireng, which later became the largest pesantren in Java in the early 20th century having four thousand students in 1947. The pesantren also became the center for the reform of traditional Islamic teaching.

On 31 January 1926, he and several traditional Islamic leaders founded Nahdlatul Ulama (Awakening of Ulamas). During the Japanese occupation era, he was arrested, and several months later he was released and became Head of Religious Affairs.

He died suddenly on 25 July 1947 due to hypertension, after hearing news that Dutch troops were winning a battle in Malang.

== Personal life ==
He married seven times and all of his wives were daughters of ulamas. Four of his wives were Khadijah, Nafisah, Nafiqah and Masrurah. One of his sons, Wahid Hasyim was one of the formulators of the Jakarta Charter and later became Minister of Religious Affairs, while his grandson Abdurrahman Wahid became President of Indonesia.

== Legacy ==
He is the namesake of the Hasyim Asy'ari University, as well as the Indonesian Islamic Museum K.H. Hasyim Asy'ari. Both are located at the Tebuireng pesantren in Jombang.

== Bibliography ==
- Khuluq, Lathiful (2008). Fajar Kebangunan Ulama: Biografi K.H. Hasyim Asy'ari. Yogyakarta: LKiS Yogyakarta. ISBN 978-979-8966-37-8.
