= Amal Fathullah Zarkasyi =

Indonesian Muslim scholar (1949–2026)

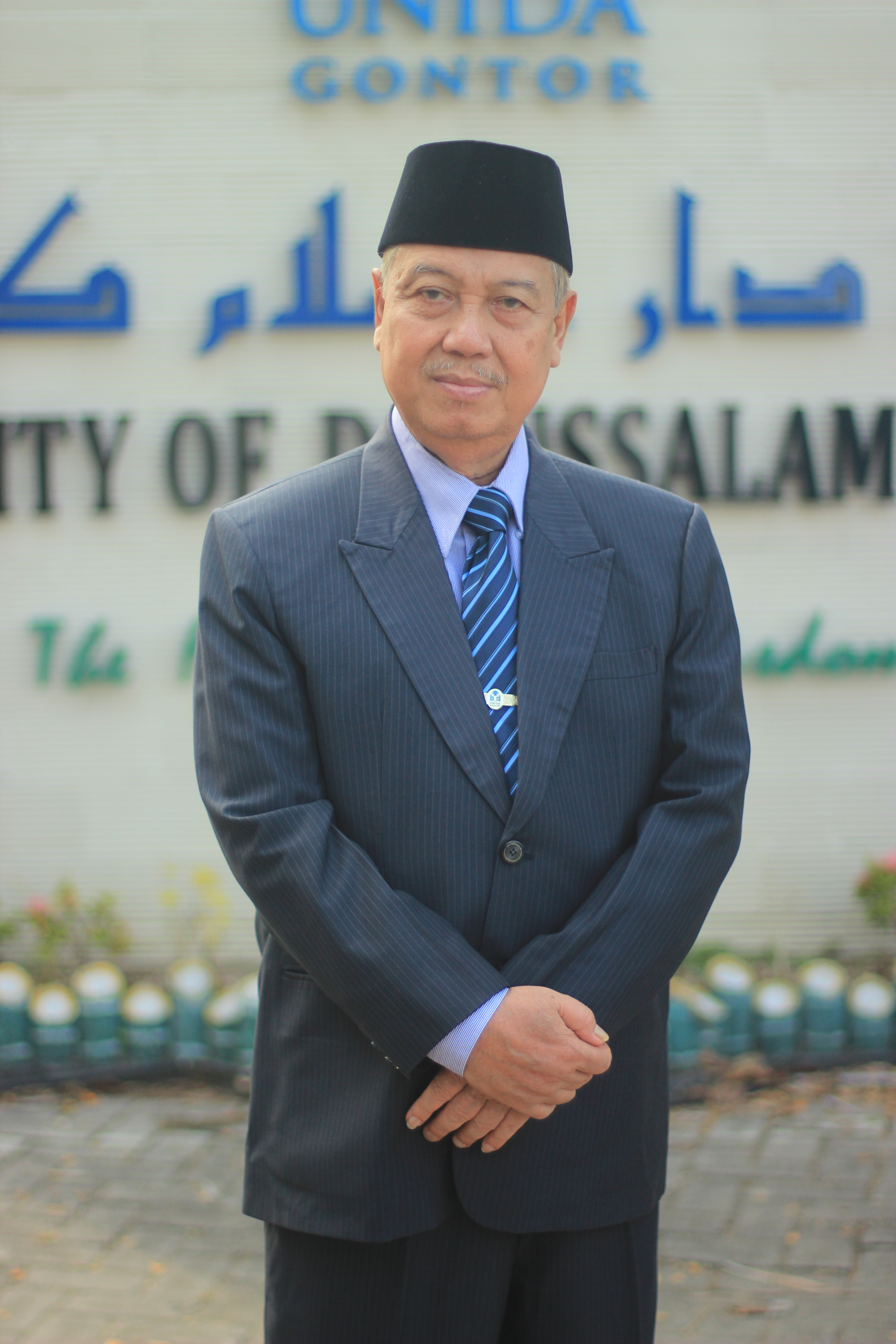
- Zarkasyi in 2016
- Born: 4 November 1949; Ponorogo, Indonesia
- Died: 3 January 2026 (aged 76); Surakarta, Indonesia
- Education: IAIN Sunan Ampel Surabaya; Cairo University
- Occupation: Muslim scholar

Amal Fathullah Zarkasyi (4 November 1949 – 3 January 2026) was an Indonesian Muslim scholar.

== Life and career ==
Zarkasyi was born in Ponorogo on 4 November 1949, the son of Imam Zarkasyi, the founder of the Darussalam Gontor Islamic Boarding School. After completing his first associate degree in education studies at the Darussalam Institute for Education Studies (currently University of Darussalam Gontor), he then earned a bachelor's degree in Comparative Religion from the Faculty of Ushuluddin, IAIN Sunan Ampel Surabaya, in 1978. He then continued his studies to the Department of Islamic Philosophy at the Faculty of Darul Ulum, Cairo University, Egypt and graduated with a masters' degree in 1987.

After completing his master's studies, he was then assigned by his father to teach at the Darussalam Education Institute (IPD) Gontor from 1978 to 1980. He was then appointed the Dean of the Faculty of Ushuluddin IPD Gontor for the period of service 1988–2000, this position he held until the change of IPD to the Institute of Islamic Studies of Darussalam (ISID) in 1994, where he served as Vice Chancellor III of ISID from 1996 to 2000. Then, he was appointed Vice Chancellor IV of ISID for the 2006-2014 period. During his tenure, he supported and took care of the transformation of ISID into Universitas Darussalam Gontor (UNIDA Gontor). In 2014, Amal Fathullah Zarkasyi was inaugurated as a professor in the field of Kalam Sciences, as well as the first rector of UNIDA Gontor until 2020.

In 2020, the leader of Pondok Modern Darussalam Gontor, Abdullah Syukri Zarkasyi died, and was followed by Syamsul Hadi Abdan. The Waqf Board of Pondok Modern Darussalam Gontor, as the highest institution in its organizational structure, later appointed Amal as the head of Pondok Modern Darussalam Gontor, effectively ending his tenure at the University of Darussalam Gontor.

== Death ==
Zarkasyi died at the Dr. Moewardi Hospital in Surakarta on 3 January 2026, at the age of 76.
