= The Rough Guide to the Music of Indonesia =

Compilation album by Various artists
- Released: 17 October 2000
- Genre: World, Indonesian
- Length: 72:36
- Label: World Music Network

Full series chronology
The Rough Guide to Bhangra (2000)	The Rough Guide to the Music of Indonesia (2000)	The Rough Guide to the Music of Jamaica (2001)

The Rough Guide to the Music of Indonesia is a world music compilation album originally released in 2000. Part of the World Music Network Rough Guides series, the release covers a broad swathe of the music of Indonesia, both traditional and modern. The compilation was produced by Phil Stanton, co-founder of the World Music Network. Paul Fisher compiled the tracks and wrote the liner notes, and Duncan Baker coordinated the project.

== Critical reception ==
Professional ratings
Review scores
Source	Rating
Robert Christgau	A-
AllMusic	4/5 stars

The album met critical appraise upon release. In his review for AllMusic, Bret Love rose the subject of non-gamelan Indonesian music's obscurity in the West, calling the compilation an "accessible introduction to some very unfamiliar musical traditions". Robert Christgau called it "crass" even by the standards of the series, and "at least as edutaining as Where in the World Is Carmen Sandiego?". Writing for JazzTimes, Josef Woodard called it "as much a treat for the ears as it is a challenge to our preconceptions". Both Christgau and Woodard contrasted the record with the 20-CD Music of Indonesia series by Smithsonian Folkways, comparing the latter's ethnomusicological focus with the Rough Guide's pop overtones.

== Track listing ==
No.	Title	Artist	Length
1.	"Sambasunda"	CBMW	5:11
2.	"Anoman Obong"	Waldjinah	5:43
3.	"Kareta Malam"	Elvy Sukaesih	3:51
4.	"Begadang"	Rhoma Irama	3:06
5.	"Jeruk Manis"	L.S. Gelik	5:11
6.	"Dar Der Dor"	Detty Kurnia	5:41
7.	"Los Quin Tallu-Tallu"	Grup Bamba Puang	6:15
8.	"Ceurik Rahwana"	Imas Permas & Asep Kosasih	4:22
9.	"Sumbawa"	Sabah Habas Mustapha & The Jugala All-Stars	6:27
10.	"Rentak 106"	Sandii	3:12
11.	"Joged Laksmana Mati Raden Ditembak"	Ibu Maimunah Mochtar & Group	4:36
12.	"Pege Sakarimpang"	Uning-Uningan	2:04
13.	"Kucap-Kicup"	Gentra Pasundan	7:02
14.	"Boleh Bersuka Ria"	Nasida Ria	5:15
15.	"Bengawan Solo"	Waldjinah/Gesang	4:40
