= Hasanain Juaini =

Indonesian environmentalist

Hasanain Juaini is an Indonesian environmental conservationist, educator and winner of the Ramon Magsaysay Award.

== Early life ==
Hasanain Juaini was born on August 17, 1964, to Haji Djuaini Muchtar and Hajjah Jahrah. His name "Juaini" is derived from his father's name, Tuan Guru Juaini. He began his education at Nahdlatul Wathan (NW) Elementary School, graduating in 1975, and continued to Nahdlatul Wathan Junior High School, from which he graduated in 1978. He then studied at Kullyatul Mua’allimin al-Islamiyah Gontor in Ponorogo, East Java, completing his education there in 1984. Hasanain later attended the Institute of Islamic and Arabic Sciences (LIPIA), where he majored in law and graduated in 1995, before earning another degree in law from Mataram University in 2006.

== Ramon Magsaysay Award ==
The Board of Trustees of the Ramon Magsaysay Award Foundation conferred the award on Hasanain Juaini in 2011, citing his “holistic, community-based approach to pesantren education in Indonesia,” and his creative promotion of values including gender equality, religious harmony, environmental conservation, individual achievement, and civic engagement among youth and communities.
