= Rimbi Temple =

Hindu temple in Indonesia

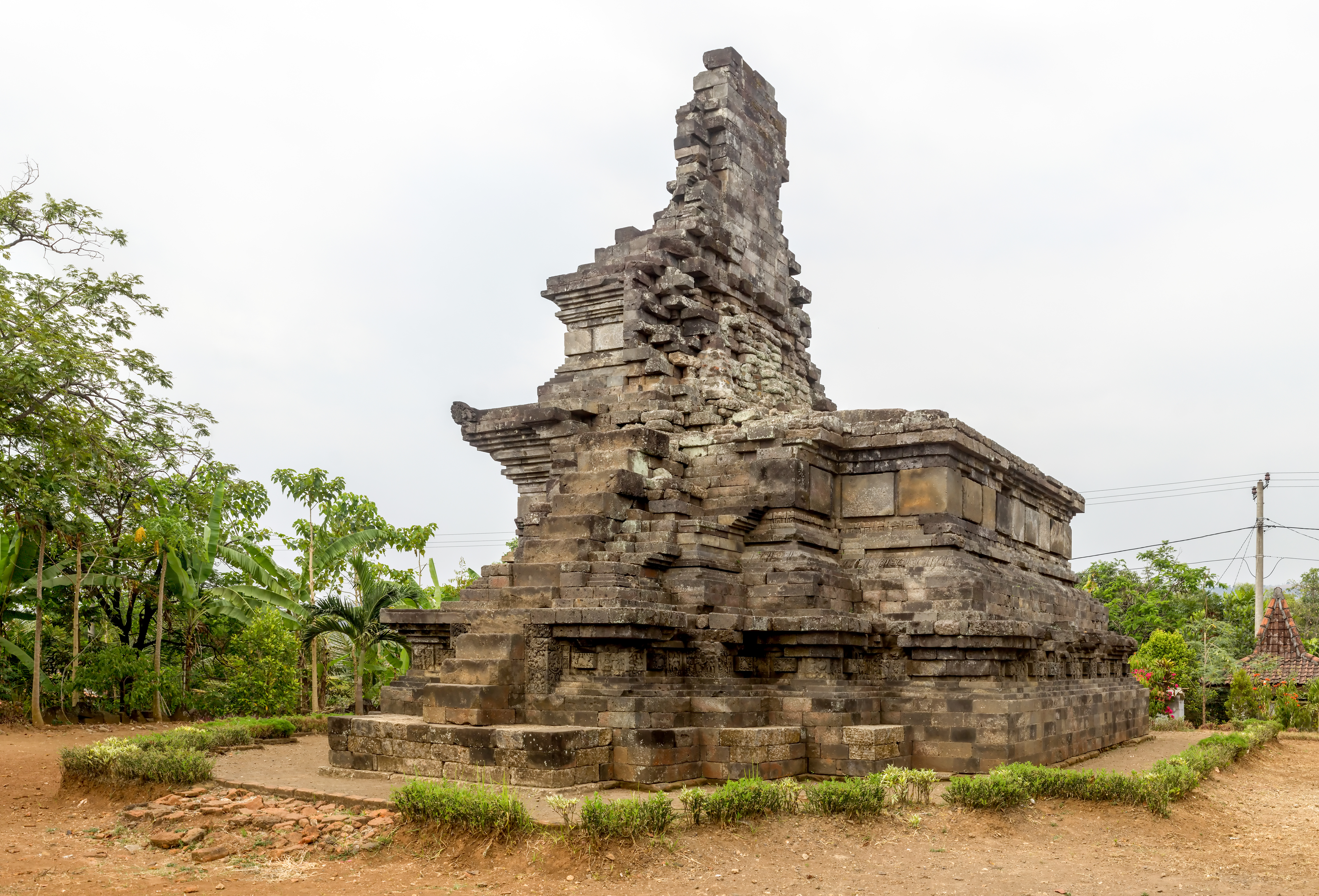
- Rimbi Temple in 2017

Religion
- Affiliation: Hinduism
- Deity: Parvati

Location
- Location: Jombang Regency
- State: East Java
- Country: Indonesia
- Interactive map of Rimbi Temple
- Coordinates: 7°40′25″S 112°20′35″E

Architecture
- Completed: 14th century

Rimbi Temple, also known as Cungkup Pulo, is a Hindu temple in Jombang Regency, East Java, Indonesia. Built during the 14th century by the Majapahit Kingdom in commemoration of Queen Tribhuwana Wijayatunggadewi, the temple was rediscovered in the 19th century. It is partially collapsed, with the surviving portion reaching a height of 12 metres (39 ft). The temple includes a three-tiered base adorned with 51 reliefs, as well as several sculptures. The temple was designated a Cultural Property of Indonesia in 2020.

== Description ==
Rimbi Temple is located in Pulosari Village, part of Bareng District in Jombang Regency, East Java, Indonesia. It sits atop a 896-square-metre (9,640 sq ft) lot along the road to Wonosalam on Mount Anjasmoro. The temple is named for Dewi Arimbi, a rakshashi (demon) from the Hindu epic Mahabharata. Local tradition holds that Arimbi and her brother Arimba are buried in two graves near the temple.

Rimbi Temple consists of an andesite structure, partially collapsed, atop a brick foundation. The surviving structure reaches a height of 12 metres (39 ft), with a three-tiered base measuring 13.24 by 9.1 metres (43.4 by 29.9 ft). The central structure appears split in two, with only the northern portion of the temple reaching the maximum height. Based on the orientation of its stairs, the temple faced west.

The temple includes numerous reliefs and sculptures. The first tier of the base includes a series of 51 reliefs surrounding the temple that depict various scenes from a narrative about water and self-purification. These include a scene from the Garudeya, wherein Garuda speaks to his mother Vinata before diving into the sea. Further reliefs include geometric patterns and rafflesia flowers, as well as the emblem of the Majapahit Kingdom. The remains of several sculptures, each approximately 125 centimetres (49 in) high, are located along the temple's east side.

== History ==
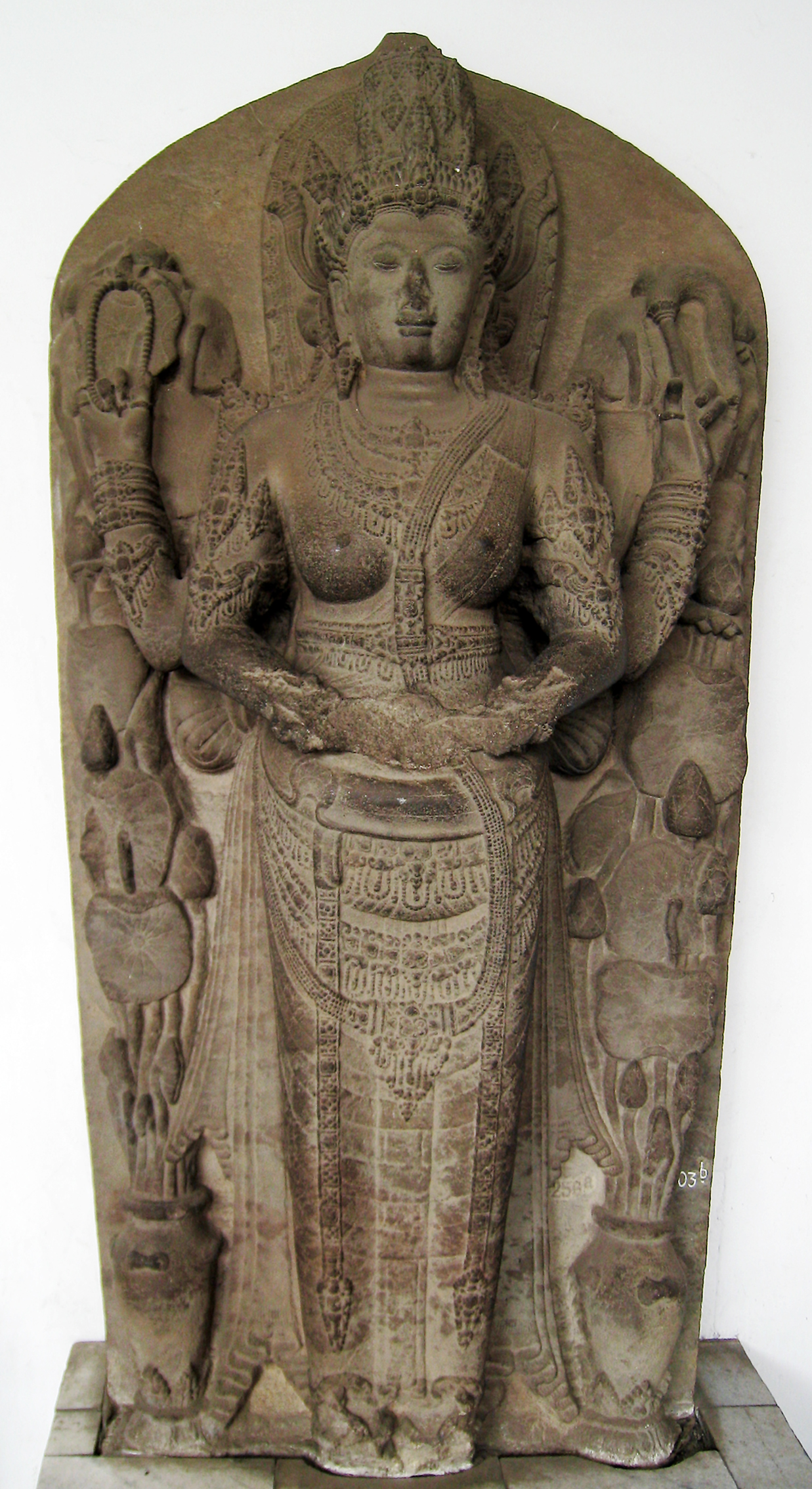
The sculpture of Queen Tribhuwana Wijayatunggadewi as Parvati

Rimbi Temple is believed to have been built in the 14th century by the Majapahit Kingdom in commemoration of Queen Tribhuwana Wijayatunggadewi. Although only one structure has survived, it is thought that the temple was initially part of a complex. The temple was used to worship the Hindu goddess Parvati as part of a Shaivist tradition.

The temple was rediscovered by Alfred Russel Wallace in the late 19th century during a botanical expedition to the region. At the time the structure had partially collapsed, potentially due to volcanic activity. Archaeological efforts were undertaken by J. Knebel in 1907. An andesite sculpture (murti) of Parvati, thought to be a representation of Queen Tribhuwana, was removed from the site after being found at the centre of the temple. The 189-centimetre (74 in) sculpture is now held by the National Museum of Indonesia.

In the 1990s efforts were made to reinforce Rimbi Temple, with a particular focus on the base. In 2020, the temple was named a Cultural Property of Indonesia by the Jombang Regency government. This allowed greater access to funding for restoration work. The temple receives little tourism. As of 2019, parking was sufficient for only one vehicle and the temple received fewer than 100 visitors per month.

== Works cited ==
- "Candi Arimbi, Sang Dewi yang Terabai" [Arimbi Temple, the Neglected Goddess]. Lentera (in Indonesian). 15 August 2019. Archived from the original on 12 July 2026.
- "Candi Rimbi" [Rimbi Temple] (in Indonesian). Department of Tourism, East Java. Archived from the original on 12 July 2026.
- Dyahwati, Wiwit (2016). "Ornamen Relief Candi Rimbi sebagai Inspirasi Pengembangan Motif Batik Kabupaten Jombang" [The Ornamental Reliefs of Rimbi Temple as Inspiration for Developing a Batik Motif in Jombang Regency]. Jurnal Seni Rupa. 4 (1).
- Haq, Muhammad Faishal (18 December 2025). "Mengulik Sejarah Candi Rimbi yang Menyimpan Jejak Era Majapahit" [Exploring the History of Rimbi Temple, Which Contains Traces of the Majapahit Era]. Detik.com (in Indonesian). Archived from the original on 12 July 2026.
- Lavidavayastama, Mahendra (8 December 2023). "Mengenal Dewi Arimbi, Sosok Raksasi yang Memikat Hati Bima" [Introduction to Dewi Arimbi, the Demoness who Stole Bima's Heart]. Archived from the original on 11 August 2026.
- Muthiah, Waridah; Sachari, Agus; Setiawan, Pindi (2021). "Variasi Perhiasan Kepala Arca Parwati Koleksi Museum Nasional di Indonesia" [The Variety of Headdresses of the Parvati Statue Collection of the National Museum in Indonesia]. Naditira Widya (in Indonesian). 15 (2): 71–86. doi:10.24832/nw.v15i2.461.
- Ningsih, Widya Lestari (16 February 2023). "Sejarah Candi Rimbi, Dinamai Seperti Ibu Gatotkaca" [History of Rimbi Temple, Named After the Mother of Gatotkaca]. Kompas (in Indonesian). Archived from the original on 12 July 2026.
