= Sunan Ampel State Islamic University Surabaya =

State Islamic university in Surabaya, East Java, Indonesia

UIN Sunan Ampel Surabaya
- Seal of UIN Sunan Ampel Surabaya
- Former name: Institut Agama Islam Negeri Sunan Ampel
- Motto in English: Building Character Qualities: For the Smart, Pious, Honorable Nation
- Type: Public Islamic university
- Established: July 5, 1965
- Affiliations: Islam
- Rector: Akhmad Muzakki
- Students: ±17.000
- Location: Jalan Ahmad Yani 117, Surabaya, East Java, 60237, Indonesia; 7.32233°S 112.734251°E
- Campus: Urban
- Colours: Dark green
- Website: uinsa.ac.id
- Location of UIN Sunan Ampel

Sunan Ampel State Islamic University Surabaya, also abbreviated as UIN Sunan Ampel (formerly IAIN Sunan Ampel), is one of the state Islamic universities in Indonesia based in Surabaya which organizes multidisciplinary Islamic education as well as secular education including science and technology. The university has history of cultivating the intellectual background for Islamic movements and organizations, especially for Nahdlatul Ulama. UIN Surabaya is named after Sunan Ampel, one of Wali Sanga, the legendary Sufi figures who greatly contributed to the spread of Islam in Indonesia.

== History ==
At the end of the 1950s, Muslim community leaders in East Java proposed the idea of establishing an Islamic college through the Ministry of Religious Affairs. They held a meeting in Jombang in 1961, and during the meeting, Soenarjo, who later became the rector of Sunan Kalijaga State Islamic University, attended as a resource to convey the necessary issues for the foundation of the college. In the final session of the meeting, the forum endorsed several important decisions, including the establishment of State Islamic University Committee, the faculty of sharia in Surabaya, and the faculty of tarbiyah (Islamic education) in Malang.

On October 9, 1961, the foundation established the faculty of sharia and the faculty of tarbiyah. On October 28, 1961, the Minister of Religious Affairs issued Decree No. 17/1961, to legalize the establishment these faculties. Then on October 1, 1964, faculty of ushuluddin (Islamic belief) in Kediri was inaugurated based on the Decree of the Minister of Religious Affairs No. 66/1964. Bringing together the above three faculties, the Minister of Religious Affairs issued Decree No. 20/1965 on the establishment of IAIN (State Islamic Institute) Sunan Ampel based in Surabaya. Subsequently, IAIN Sunan Ampel expanded rapidly. In the period between 1966 and 1970, IAIN Sunan Ampel already had 18 faculties spread over three provinces, East Java, East Kalimantan and West Nusa Tenggara.

However, when accreditation of IAIN faculty is applied, five of the 18 faculties were closed to be combined with the other adjacent faculty. Furthermore, with the government regulation no. 33 in 1985, the faculty of tarbiyah in Samarinda was separated and submitted its management to IAIN Antasari Banjarmasin. In addition, the faculty of tarbiyah in Bojonegoro was transferred to Surabaya and changed its status to the faculty of tarbiyah under the management of IAIN Surabaya. During this time, IAIN Sunan Ampel had 12 faculties scattered throughout East Java and one faculty each in Mataram, Lombok and West Nusa Tenggara. Today, IAIN Sunan Ampel is concentrated in five parental faculties located in Surabaya. On October 1, 2013, IAIN Sunan Ampel changed its name to UIN Sunan Ampel (UINSA) Surabaya based on Presidential Decree No. 65.

Today, the issue arises regarding the transformation into the more secular-oriented curriculum which aimed at the increase in the enrollments. Raised concerns are adverse effects in the quality of religious education which potentially result in the proliferation of radicalism results from the religious ignorance.

== Faculty ==
- Faculty of Adab and Humanities
- Faculty of Da'wah and Communication Science
- Faculty of Sharia and Law
- Faculty of Tarbiyah and Teacher Training
- Faculty of Ushuludin and Philosophy
- Faculty of Social and Political Sciences
- Faculty of Psychology and Health
- Faculty of Economics and Islamic Business
- Faculty of Science and Technology
- Postgraduate School

== Rector ==
The List of Rector of Sunan Ampel State Islamic University :

1. [1965 - 1972] : Prof. Teungku H. Ismail Ya'qub, S.H, M.A

2. [1972 - 1975] : Prof. Dr. Sjafi'i Abdul Karim

3. [1975 - 1987] : Drs. Marsekan Fatawi

4. [1987 - 1992] : Dr. H. Bisri Afandi, M.A

5. [1992 - 2000] : Drs. K.H. Abdul Jabbar Adlan, M.Ag

6. [2000 - 2009] : Prof. Dr. H. M. Ridlwan Nasir, M.A

7. [2009 - 2012] : Prof. Dr. H. Nur Syam, M.Si

8. [2012 - 2018] : Prof. Dr. H. Abdul A'la Basyir, M.Ag

9. [2018 - 2022] : Prof. H. Masdar Hilmy, S.Ag, M.A, Ph.D

10. [2022–present] : Prof. Akhmad Muzakki, M.Ag, Grad.Dip, SEA, M.Phil, Ph.D
