= Ngawi =

Ngawi may refer to:

- Ngawi Regency, an administrative division of Indonesia
- Ngawi (town), capital of Ngawi Regency
- Ngawi railway station, a station of Paron District, Ngawi
- Ngawi, New Zealand, a village in Wairarapa District, New Zealand
