= Hilmar Farid =

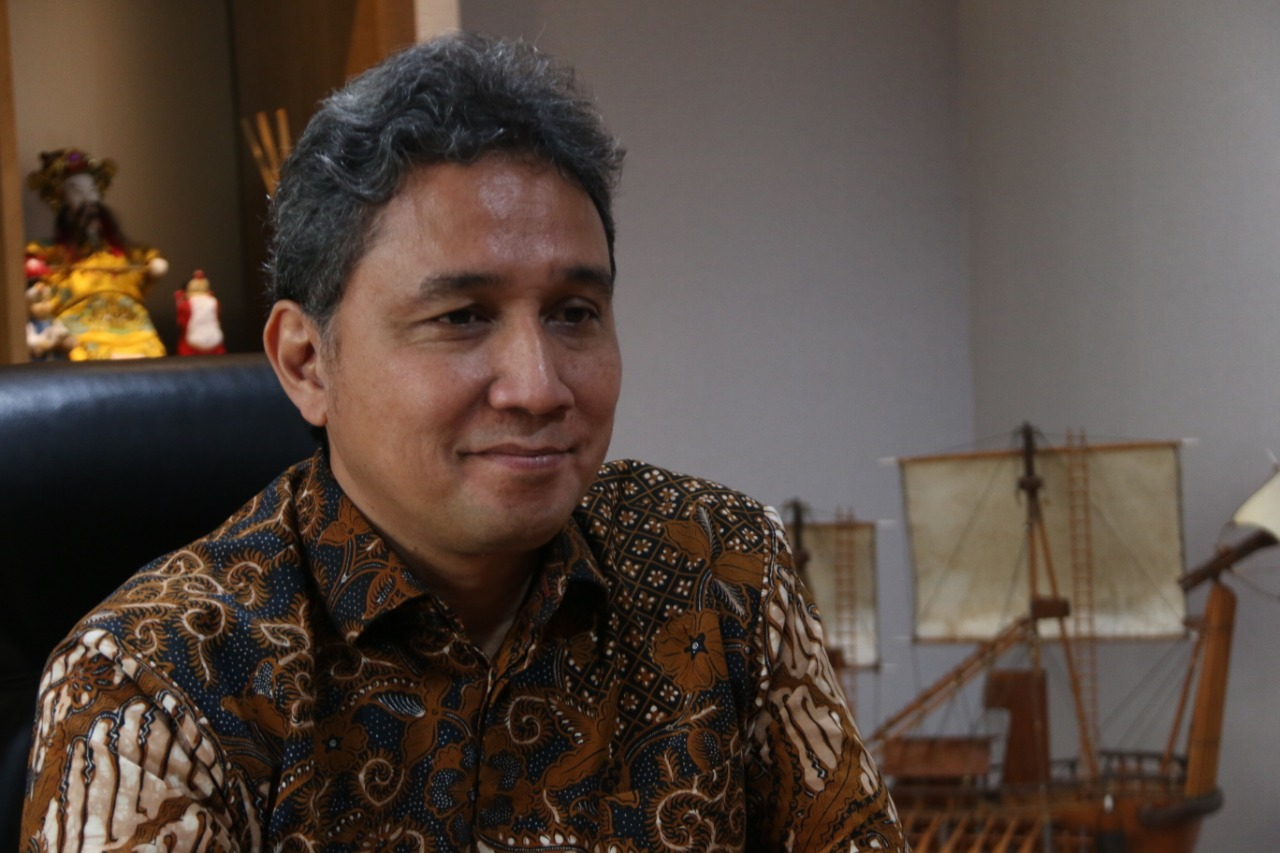
- Hilmar Farid in 2020
- Born: Hilmar Farid Setiadi; March 8, 1968 (age 58); Bonn, West Germany
- Citizenship: Indonesian
- Occupations: historian, activist, politician, writer

Academic background
- Education: National University of Singapore
- Thesis: Rewriting the Nation: Pramoedya and the Politics of Decolonization (2014)
- Doctoral advisor: Philip Holden

Academic work
- Discipline: historian
- Main interests: Indonesian social and cultural history, literature
- Website: hilmarfarid.id

Hilmar Farid (born 1968) is an Indonesian academic, activist, politician and translator. He was Director General of Culture in the Indonesian Ministry of Education, Culture, Research, and Technology from 2015 to 2024. During his career he has helped establish various Indonesian organizations, including the Culture Working Network (Indonesian: Jaringan Kerja Budaya) in 1994 and the Indonesian Institute of Social History (Indonesian: Institut Sejarah Sosial Indonesia, ISSI) in 2002.

== Biography ==
=== Early life ===
Hilmar Farid Setiadi was born in Bonn, West Germany on 8 March 1968. His father, Agus Setiadi, was a translator, notably of children's novels, and his mother Els Lapian was a civil servant in Indonesian embassies. The family returned to Indonesia in 1976. Before enrolling in university, as a youth, he followed in his father's footsteps and published some Indonesian translations of Enid Blyton and Anthony Buckeridge books with Gramedia in the late 1980s.

=== Academic career ===
Hilmar Farid started a Bachelor's degree in History from the University of Indonesia in 1988, completing it in 1993. After that, he became an instructor at the Jakarta Institute of the Arts (Indonesian: Institut Kesenian Jakarta), where he stayed for four years. During that period he helped co-found the Culture Working Network (Indonesian: Jaringan Kerja Budaya) in Jakarta, a progressive cultural organization which published a magazine Media Kerja Budaya. Through this group he developed his ideas about history and culture and their limitations under the New Order dictatorship, which lasted until 1998.

He founded and became the head of the Institute for Indonesian Social History (Indonesian: Institut Sejarah Sosial Indonesia, ISSI) in 2002. The ISSI worked hard to preserve archival materials about social movements and minority groups and to increase the Indonesian public's understanding of their country's history. In 2007 he stepped down from his position leading the ISSI, although he remained on its board.

After that he started a Phd in Cultural studies at the National University of Singapore examining the Indonesian writer Pramoedya Ananta Toer. In May 2014 he defended his PhD dissertation Rewriting the Nation: Pramoedya and the Politics of Decolonization. Since 2014 he has once again resumed teaching at the Jakarta Institute of the Arts, as well as at the University of Indonesia (during 2014–17).

=== Political career and activism ===
Hilmar Farid was critical of the Indonesian government's behavior in the 1999 East Timorese crisis and traveled to East Timor as a representative of the activist group ELSAM (Indonesian: Lembaga Studi dan Advokasi Masyarakat). Through the ISSI and other groups, he continued to be active in campaigns to support human rights in the Indonesia in the 2000s and 2010s. In 2010 spoke out on behalf of religions minorities, such as members of the Batak Christian Protestant Church and Ahmadiyyas who were being targeted by members of the Islamist group Islamic Defenders Front. He was also vocal in support of a case in the Constitutional Court of Indonesia which, in October 2010, struck down decades-old book censorship laws.

In 2012 he became head of the organization Perkumpulan Praxis, a civil society research and advocacy group. He also helped found the New Jakarta Movement Volunteers (Indonesian: Relawan Penggerak Jakarta Baru, RPJB) which sought to support its preferred candidates in the 2012 Jakarta gubernatorial election, including notably the successful candidate Joko Widodo (commonly known as Jokowi), whom Farid had been impressed by when he made an appearance at a Praxis event. He was also a supporter and senior advisor to Jokowi's candidacy in the 2014 Indonesian presidential election. Anies Baswedan, then Minister of Education and Culture, appointed Farid Director General of Culture under that Ministry on 31 December 2015, replacing Kacung Maridjan. He was the first non civil servant to be appointed to that role. In an interview with BBC early in his term, he explained that he hoped to create new and long-lasting frameworks to support cultural creation in Indonesia and that he hoped to improve attendance in the country's museums. He was also active in negotiations with the Netherlands government over the repatriation of items taken out of Indonesia during the colonial era.

He was also appointed by Jokowi as an independent commissioner of the state-owned steel enterprise Krakatau Steel in April 2015, though in April 2016 he was replaced in that role by Ridwan Djamaluddin. Since November 2020 has been head commissioner of Balai Pustaka, the state-owned literary publishing agency.

== Selected works ==
- Tahun yang tak pernah berakhir: memahami pengalaman korban 65: esai-esai sejarah lisan (Neverending year: understanding the experience of the '65 victims; as contributor. Institut Sejarah Sosial Indonesia, Jakarta, 2004)
- The struggle for truth and justice: a survey of transitional justice initiatives throughout Indonesia (co-writer with Rikardo Simarmatra; International Center for Transitional Justice, New York, 2004)
- Kisah Tiga Patung (History of three statues, Indonesia Berdikari, Jakarta, 2012).
- Arus Balik Kebudayaan: sejarah sebagai kritik (Reversing the flow of culture: history as criticism, Dewan Kesenian Jakarta, 2014)
- Perang suara: bahasa dan politik pergerakan (War of voices: language and movement politics, Komunitas Bambu, Depok, 2024)
- Pemuda, Pergerakan dan Sejarah: Kumpulan Esai di Prisma (Youth, movement and history: Collection of essays from Prisma, Komunitas Bambu, 2024).
