= Jombang, Jombang =

Capital of Jombang Regency, Indonesia

Jombang
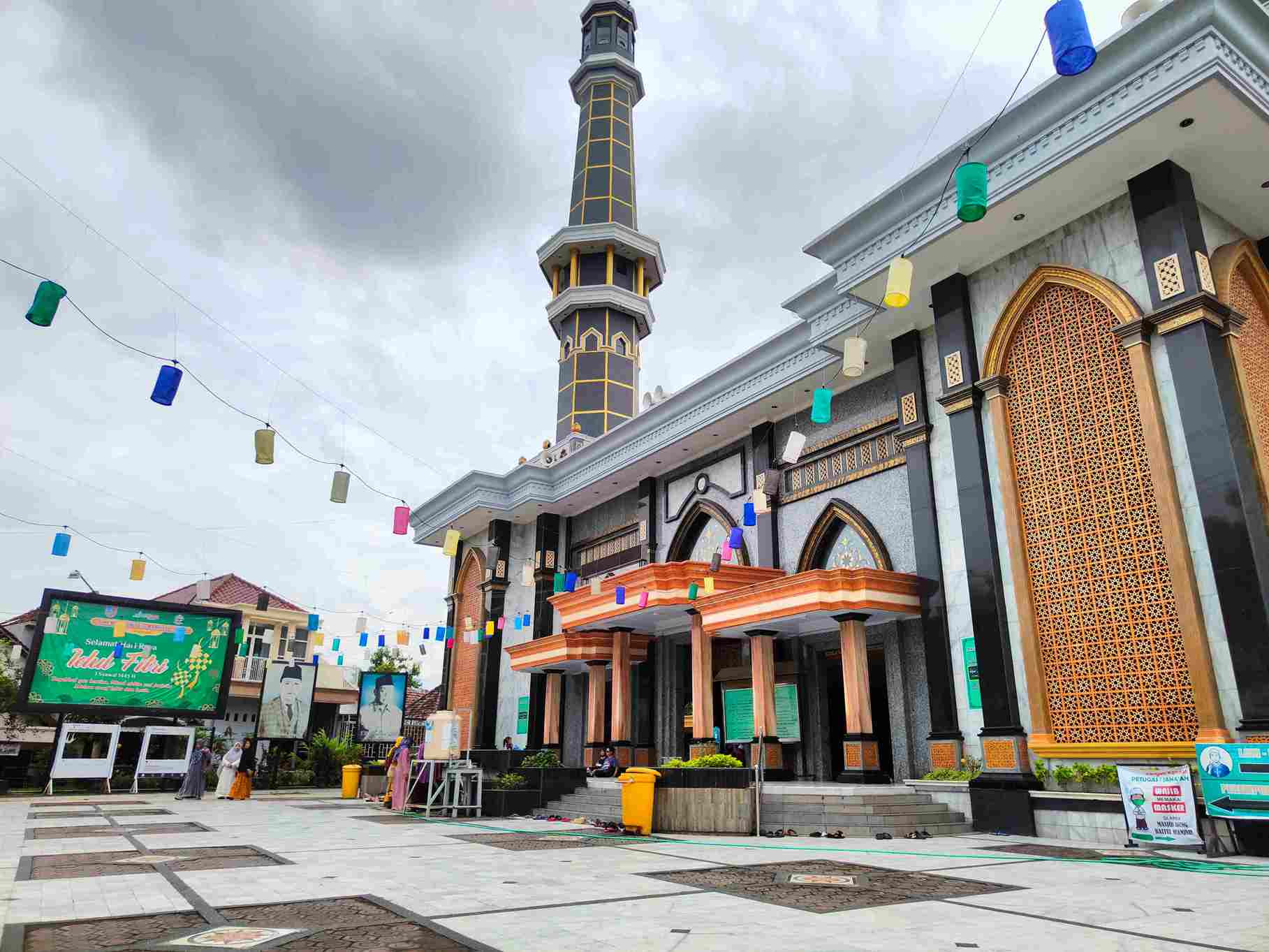
- Great Mosque of Jombang

- Location in East Java and Indonesia Jombang (Indonesia)
- Coordinates: 7°32′18″S 112°14′17″E
- Country: Indonesia
- Province: East Java
- Regency: Jombang Regency
- District: Jombang District

Area
  - Total: 15.29 sq mi (39.59 km^{2})
- Elevation: 138 ft (42 m)

Population (mid 2025 estimate)
  - Total: 144,090
  - Density: 9,426/sq mi (3,640/km^{2})
- Time zone: UTC+7 (Indonesia Western Standard Time)

Jombang is a large town and an administrative district (kecamatan) and the regency seat of Jombang Regency, East Java, Indonesia. It covers an area of 39.59 km^{2} and it had a population of 137,233 at the 2010 Census and 139,831 at the 2020 Census, while the official estimate as of mid 2025 was 144,090.

== Climate ==
Jombang has a tropical savanna climate (Aw) with moderate to little rainfall from May to October and heavy rainfall from November to April.

Climate data for Jombang
Month	Jan	Feb	Mar	Apr	May	Jun	Jul	Aug	Sep	Oct	Nov	Dec	Year
Mean daily maximum °C (°F)	30.0 (86.0)	30.0 (86.0)	30.3 (86.5)	30.8 (87.4)	31.0 (87.8)	31.0 (87.8)	30.9 (87.6)	31.6 (88.9)	32.4 (90.3)	32.7 (90.9)	31.8 (89.2)	30.7 (87.3)	31.1 (88.0)
Daily mean °C (°F)	26.0 (78.8)	26.0 (78.8)	26.2 (79.2)	26.4 (79.5)	26.3 (79.3)	25.8 (78.4)	25.5 (77.9)	25.8 (78.4)	26.6 (79.9)	27.2 (81.0)	26.8 (80.2)	26.4 (79.5)	26.3 (79.2)
Mean daily minimum °C (°F)	22.1 (71.8)	22.1 (71.8)	22.1 (71.8)	22.1 (71.8)	21.6 (70.9)	20.7 (69.3)	20.1 (68.2)	20.1 (68.2)	20.8 (69.4)	21.7 (71.1)	21.9 (71.4)	22.1 (71.8)	21.5 (70.6)
Average rainfall mm (inches)	319 (12.6)	320 (12.6)	280 (11.0)	150 (5.9)	99 (3.9)	44 (1.7)	26 (1.0)	20 (0.8)	17 (0.7)	53 (2.1)	128 (5.0)	256 (10.1)	1,712 (67.4)
Source: Climate-Data.org
