= Jombang Regency =

Regency in East Java, Indonesia

Jombang Regency Kabupaten Jombang
- Regency

Other transcription(s)
  - Javanese: Jombang (Gêdrig) جَومباڠ (Pégon) ꦗꦺꦴꦩ꧀ꦧꦁ (Hånåcåråkå)
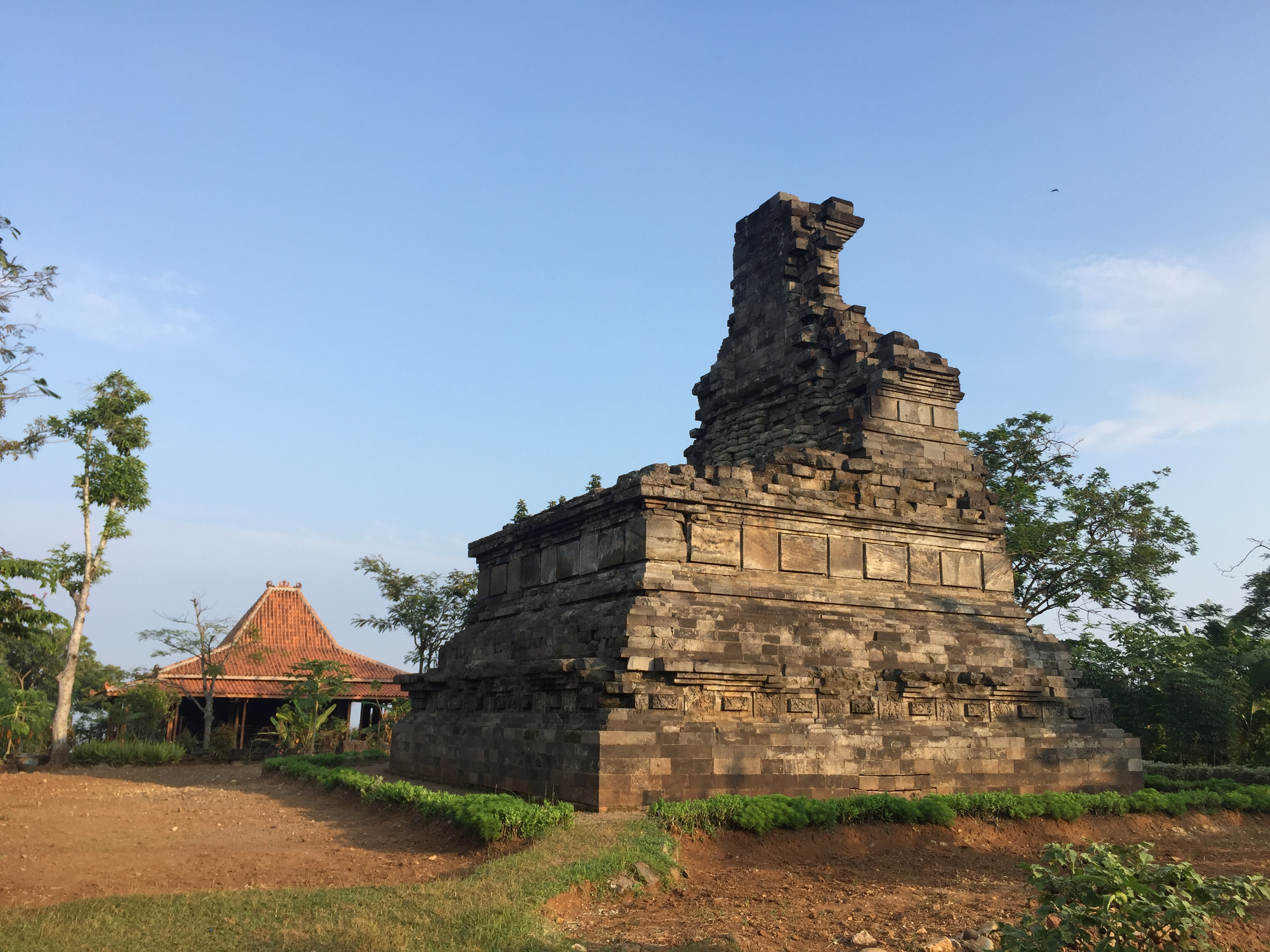
- Rimbi Temple

- Coat of arms

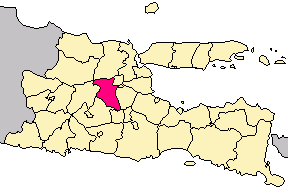
- Location within East Java

- Location in Java and Indonesia Jombang Regency (Indonesia)
- Coordinates: 7°28′S 112°14′E
- Country: Indonesia
- Province: East Java
- Capital: Jombang

Government
  - Regent: Warsubi
  - Vice Regent: Salmanudin Yazid

Area
  - Total: 1,109.62 km^{2} (428.43 sq mi)

Population (mid 2025 estimate)
  - Total: 1,380,963
  - Density: 1,244.54/km^{2} (3,223.34/sq mi)
- Time zone: UTC+7 (IWST)
- Area code: (+62) 321
- Website: jombangkab.go.id

Jombang Regency (Indonesian: Kabupaten Jombang; Javanese: ꦗꦺꦴꦩ꧀ꦧꦁ) is a regency of East Java, Indonesia, situated to the southwest of Surabaya. The capital of the regency is the town of Jombang. The regency has an area of 1,109.62 km^{2} and a population of 1,202,407 at the 2010 census and 1,318,062 at the 2020 census; the official estimate as of mid 2025 was 1,380,963 (comprising 695,340 males and 685,623 females). It became a regency in 1910. It was the birthplace of Abdurrahman Wahid, the 4th president of Indonesia.

== Administrative districts ==
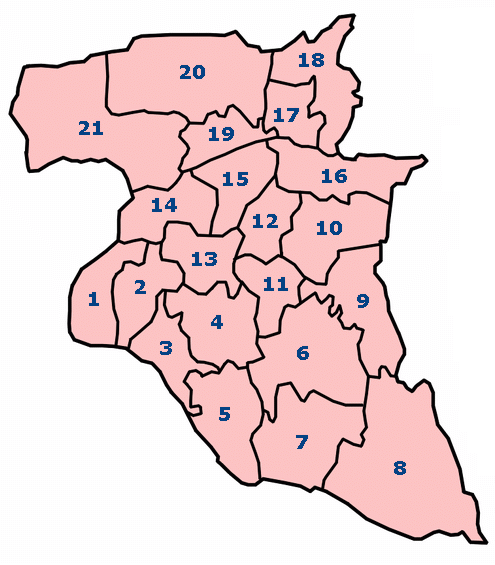

The regency is divided administratively into twenty-one districts (kecamatan), tabulated below with their areas and population totals from the 2010 census and the 2020 census, together with the official estimates as of mid 2025. The table also includes the locations of the district administrative centres, the number of administrative villages in each district (comprising 302 rural desa and 4 urban kelurahan - the latter all in Jombang (town) District), and its postal codes.

Kode Wilayah	Name of District (kecamatan)	No. on map	Area in km^{2}	Pop'n census 2010	Pop'n census 2020	Pop'n estimate mid 2025	Admin centre	No. of villages	Post codes
35.17.18	Bandar Kedung Mulyo	1	37.78	43,193	49,959	53,104	Banjarsari	11	61462
35.17.01	Perak	2	28.16	50,876	55,975	59,564	Perak	13	61461
35.17.02	Gudo	3	36.70	50,471	55,997	58,976	Gudo	18	61463
35.17.08	Diwek	4	50.33	100,969	110,495	115,239	Diwek	20	61471
35.17.03	Ngoro	5	52.65	68,863	77,814	81,084	Ngoro	13	61473
35.17.07	Mojowarno	6	63.38	85,619	95,660	100,333	Mojowarno	19	61475
35.17.04	Bareng	7	66.31	49,470	56,539	59,802	Bareng	13	61474
35.17.05	Wonosalam	8	126.84	30,609	33,520	35,398	Wonosalam	9	61476
35.17.06	Mojoagung	9	53.49	73,004	81,051	84,551	Gambiran	18	61482
35.17.11	Sumobito	10	49.37	77,039	86,385	90,721	Sumobito	21	61483
35.17.19	Jogoroto	11	29.45	62,943	70,760	75,338	Jogoroto	11	61485
35.17.10	Peterongan	12	30.34	63,784	67,822	70,904	Peterongan	14	61481
35.17.09	Jombang (town)	13	39.59	137,233	139,831	144,090	Jombatan	20 ^{(a)}	61411: 61419
35.17.20	Megaluh	14	31.67	36,507	39,725	41,619	Megaluh	13	61457
35.17.13	Tembelang	15	34.52	49,371	54,891	57,537	Pesantren	15	61452
35.17.12	Kesamben	16	54.90	59,990	66,861	69,129	Kesamben	14	61484
35.17.17	Kudu	17	28.18	28,239	31,513	33,169	Randuwatang	11	61454
35.17.21	Ngusikan	18	46.89	20,928	22,793	23,958	Ngusikan	11	61450
35.17.14	Ploso	19	28.45	38,792	41,727	43,679	Ploso	13	61453
35.17.16	Kabuh	20	98.75	39,099	41,311	43,796	Karangpaku	16	61455
35.17.15	Plandaan	21	121.87	35,408	37,383	38,972	Bangsri	13	61456
	Totals		1,109.62	1,202,407	1,318,062	1,380,963	Jombang	306	

Note: (a) comprising 4 urban kelurahan (Jombatan, Jelakombo, Kaliwungu and Kepanjen) and 16 desa.

The five last-mentioned districts in the table constitute the folded limestone hilly region in the north, separated from the rest of the regency by the Brantas River. The rest of the regency to the south of the river is more low-lying and constitutes good agricultural land, although the south-east corner (Ngoro, Mojowarno, Bareng and Wonosalam Districts) is more mountainous.

== Climate ==
Climate data for Jombang Regency
Month	Jan	Feb	Mar	Apr	May	Jun	Jul	Aug	Sep	Oct	Nov	Dec	Year
Mean daily maximum °C (°F)	33 (91)	32 (90)	33 (91)	32 (90)	31 (88)	31 (88)	30 (86)	31 (88)	32 (90)	33 (91)	35 (95)	33 (91)	32.2 (90.0)
Daily mean °C (°F)	29 (84)	28 (82)	29 (84)	28 (82)	27 (81)	27 (81)	27 (81)	27 (81)	27 (81)	28 (82)	30 (86)	29 (84)	28 (82)
Mean daily minimum °C (°F)	25 (77)	25 (77)	25 (77)	25 (77)	24 (75)	24 (75)	23 (73)	23 (73)	22 (72)	24 (75)	26 (79)	25 (77)	24.3 (75.7)
Average rainfall mm (inches)	223 (8.8)	221 (8.7)	198 (7.8)	237 (9.3)	147 (5.8)	181 (7.1)	37 (1.5)	20 (0.8)	5 (0.2)	29 (1.1)	80 (3.1)	280 (11.0)	138.2 (5.44)
Average rainy days	15	10	10	8	7	7	4	0	0	1	8	14	84
Average relative humidity (%)	71	79.78	78.32	82.83	74.16	69.7	66.61	68.03	64.23	64.22	64.3	72.8	71.3
Source 1: "Weather Forecast & Reports - Long Range & Local | Wunderground | Weather Underground". www.wunderground.com.
Source 2: "Badan Pusat Statistik Kabupaten Jombang". jombangkab.bps.go.id. Archived from the original on 2016-04-23.

Wind Speed and Humidity Data for Jombang
Month	Jan	Feb	Mar	Apr	May	Jun	Jul	Aug	Sep	Oct	Nov	Dec	Year
Maximum wind speed (km/h)	58	69	60	48	45	29	60	63	182	138	29	40	68.42
Average wind speed (km/h)	45	48	45	48	42	11	14	14	14	15	11	11	26.5
Minimum Wind Speed (km/h)	26	29	37	48	40	0	0	0	0	0	0	0	15
Minimum humidity (%)	55	57.89	59.48	62.67	56.58	53.03	49.16	47.77	41.07	39.06	40.47	48.93	50.92

== Tourism ==
Jombang receives numerous tourists conducting pilgrimages (ziarah) to the grave of Abdurrahman Wahid at the Tebuireng pesantren. The Indonesian Islamic Museum K.H. Hasyim Asy'ari, established in 2018, is located near the grave and highlights the spread of Islam in Indonesia.
