= Santri =

Orthodox Javanese religious movement

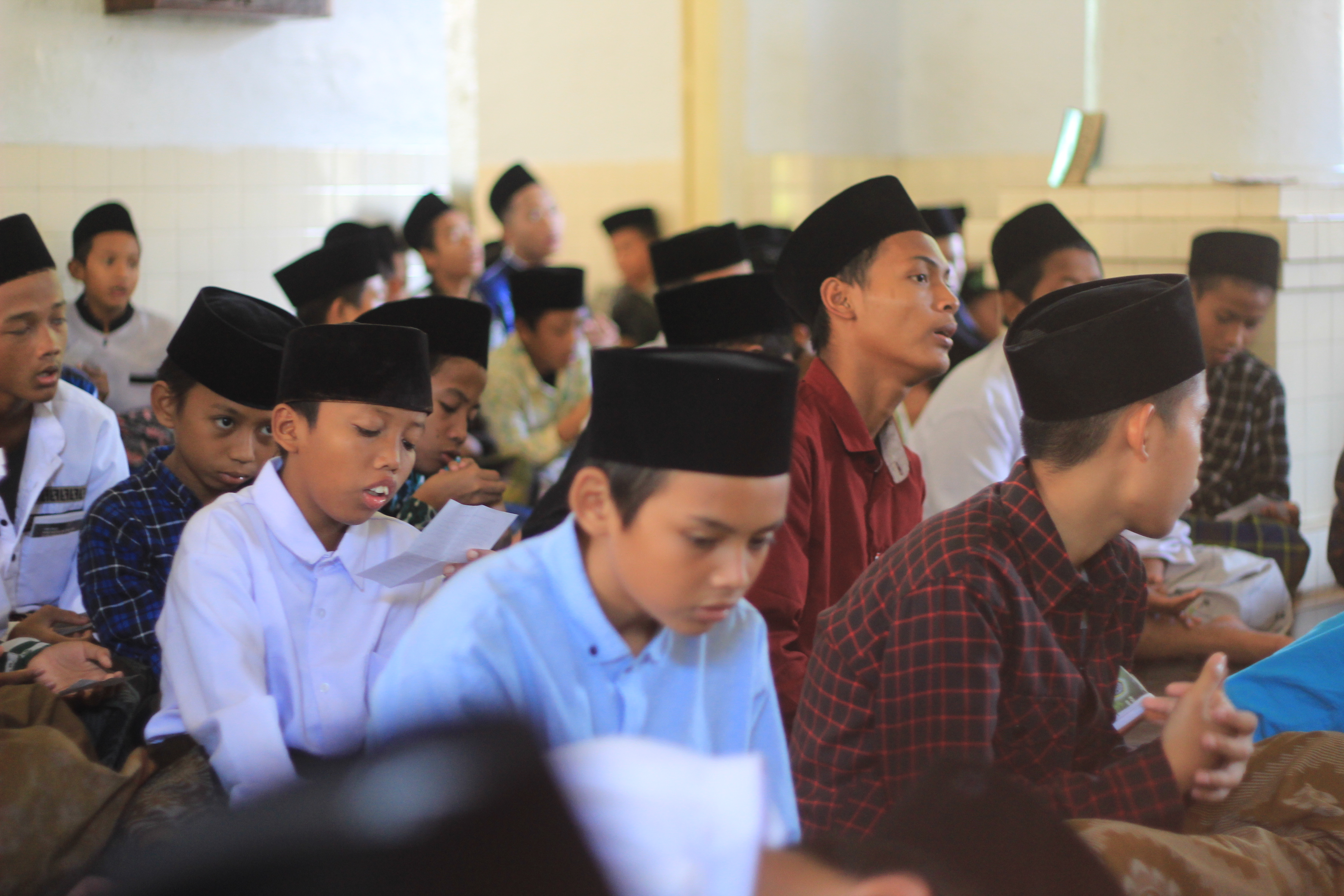
Santri reading the Qur'an after prayer

In Indonesia, santri is a term for someone who follows Islamic religious education in pesantren (Islamic boarding schools). Santri usually stay in the place until their education is complete. After completing their study period, some of them will serve the pesantren by becoming administrators. According to C.C. Berg, the term "santri" comes from Sanskrit shastri which means "one who learns Hindu scriptures"; it has the same root as the word shastra (literature).

Starting in 2015, October 22 has been designated as the National Santri Day (Hari Santri Nasional) in Indonesia. The date refers to "jihad resolution" issued by Hasyim Asy'ari of Nahdlatul Ulama to ulama and santri prior to the national revolution.

== Geertz research ==
In a study by American sociologist Clifford Geertz, the santri are people, particularly in Java, who practice a more orthodox version of Islam, in contrast to the more syncretic abangan.

Geertz identified three main cultural streams (aliran in Indonesian) in Javanese society; namely, the santri, abangan, and priyayi. Members of the Santri class are more likely to be urban dwellers, and tend to be oriented to the mosque, the Qur'an, and perhaps to Islamic canon law (Sharia). In contrast, the abangan tend to be from village backgrounds and absorb both Hindu and Muslim elements, forming a culture of animist and folk traditions, it is also claimed that this particular class originated from Sindhi sailors, who had settled in Java. The santri are sometimes referred to as Putihan (the white ones) as distinct from the 'red' abangan. The priyayi stream are the traditional bureaucratic elite and were strongly driven by hierarchical Hindu-Javanese tradition. Initially court officials in pre-colonial kingdoms, the stream moved into the colonial civil service, and then on to administrators of the modern Indonesian republic.

The santri played a key role in Indonesian nationalist movements, and formed the strongest opposition to President Suharto's New Order army-based administration. In contrast, the priyayi have tended to follow the prevailing political wind; they supported Sukarno's overt nationalism, while during Suharto's subsequent presidency, they loyally voted for his Golkar party. Poorer abangan areas became strongholds of the Indonesian Communist Party (PKI) in stark opposition to the orthodox Muslim santri. The cultural divisions descended into bloody conflict in 1965/66 when santri were opposed to communists, many of whom were from abangan streams. An estimated 500,000 -1,000,000 alleged communists were killed during the transition to the New Order, and bitter political and social rivalries remain.

== See also ==
- Islam in Southeast Asia
- Kota santri
