= Pesantren =

Islamic boarding school in Indonesia

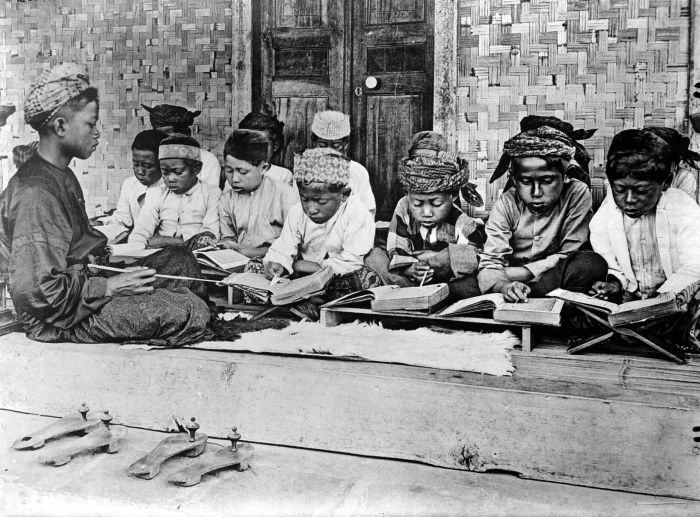
A Quranic school in Java during the Dutch colonial period

A pesantren is a traditional Islamic boarding school in Indonesia. Pesantren are usually in private houses, a pondok or a mosque. The teachings include classical Islamic texts and santri thought, taught by instructors called kyais. According to one popular tradition, the pesantren education system originated from traditional Javanese pondokan, dormitories, ashrams for Hindus or viharas for Buddhists to learn religious philosophies, martial arts, and meditation. Institutions much like them are found across the Islamic world and are called pondok in Malaysia, Southern Thailand and madrasas in India and Pakistan and much of the Arabic-speaking world. The pesantren aims to deepen knowledge of the Quran, particularly through the study of Arabic, traditions of exegesis, the Sayings of the Prophet, law and logic. The term pesantren derives from the root word santri ("student") -- pe-santri-an or the place of the santri.

As social institutions, pesantren have played a major role in Indonesia over the centuries. They emphasise core values of sincerity, simplicity, individual autonomy, solidarity and self-control. Young men and women are separated from their families, which contributes to a sense of individual commitment to the faith and close bonding to a teacher.

== Description ==
Most pesantren provide housing at little to no cost for the students (santri). Students in pesantren have almost 20 hours of activities, beginning with early morning prayer at around 4 am, and ending at around midnight with a study group in the dormitory. There are two types of educational systems for pupils at a pesantren: during the day, students attend formal secular schooling, and in the late afternoon and evening, they shift to religious rituals and studies.

Pesantren are provided to Indonesian citizens at low cost; although today some modern pesantren charge higher fees, they are still significantly cheaper than other educational institutions. Traditionally, students paid for food, lodging, and education through labour in the headmaster's fields.

All pesantren are led by a group of teachers and religious leaders known as kyai. The kyai is respected as a teacher and devout man. Kyai also play important roles in the community as a religious leader, and in recent years as a political figure. There are families that have long histories of providing kyai to their communities, with some contemporary kyai being grandsons and great-grandsons of the founders of renowned pesantren.

Starting in the second half of the twentieth century, some pesantren started adding secular subjects to their curriculum as a way of negotiating modernity. The addition of state recognized curricula has affected traditional pesantren in a number of ways. It has led to greater control by the national government. It has also restricted the number of hours available for the traditional subjects making for difficult decisions. Many pesantren leaders have decided that the training of religious leaders is not their sole purpose and are now satisfied to graduate young men and women who have the morality of Kyai. The reduction of hours available to now master two curricula has led to practical changes. While it is still possible for the children of the poor to work in the Kyai's economic ventures (more than just rice fields these days), most parents will pay both room and board and small tuition. The time that used to be spent working, is now spent in secular education.

The pesantren curriculum has four possible components:

- traditional religious education, called ngaji;
- government-recognized curricula (there are two different types to choose from);
- vocational skills training;
- character development.

Pesantren differ to the degree that they engage each of these components; however, all agree that student character development is the defining characteristic of any pesantren.

Through curricular redesign, pesantren people engage in a process of (re)imagining modernity. Modernity must be first imagined as potentially dangerous in terms of the morals that often accompany it. It must then be imagined as redeemable, that it can be detached from one set of "problematic" morals and reattached to Islamic morality.

One prominent pesantren figure in Indonesia is Abdurrahman Wahid (Gus Dur), the fourth President of Indonesia. He was well-educated at pesantren in his youth and was himself the grandson of the Kyai that founded the Indonesian religious political organization, Nahdlatul Ulama. Gus Dur headed the organization from 1984 until 1999, and after his term as president, returned to teaching in his pesantren in Ciganjur, Jagakarsa.

== See also ==
- Islam in Indonesia
- Madrasa
- Surau
- Kyai, honorific title for leaders of pesantren
- List of Islamic seminaries
- Kitab kuning
- Kota santri
