= 15th century =

One hundred years, from 1401 to 1500

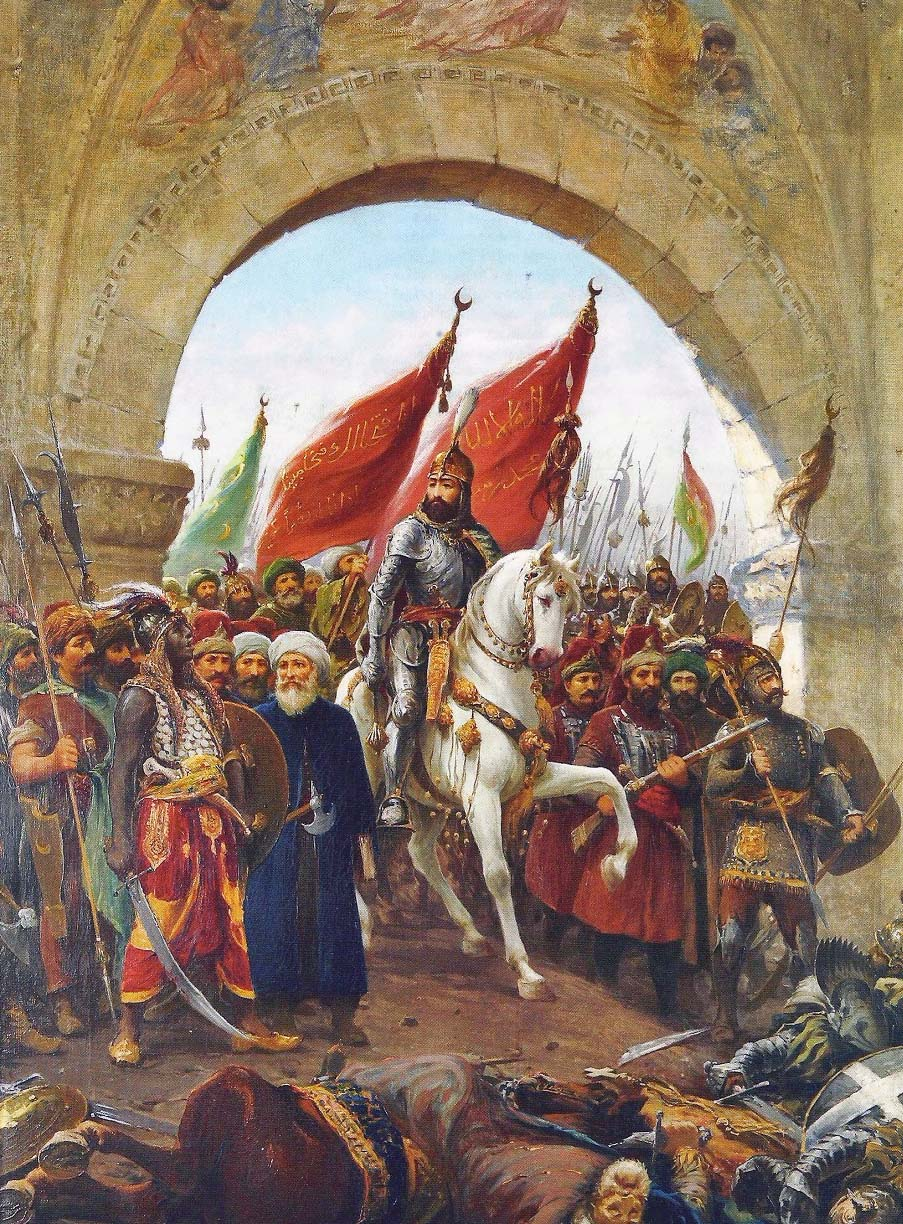
Ottoman Sultan Mehmed II, victorious at the Ottoman conquest of Constantinople and the fall of the Byzantine Empire. Various historians describe it as the end of the Middle Ages.

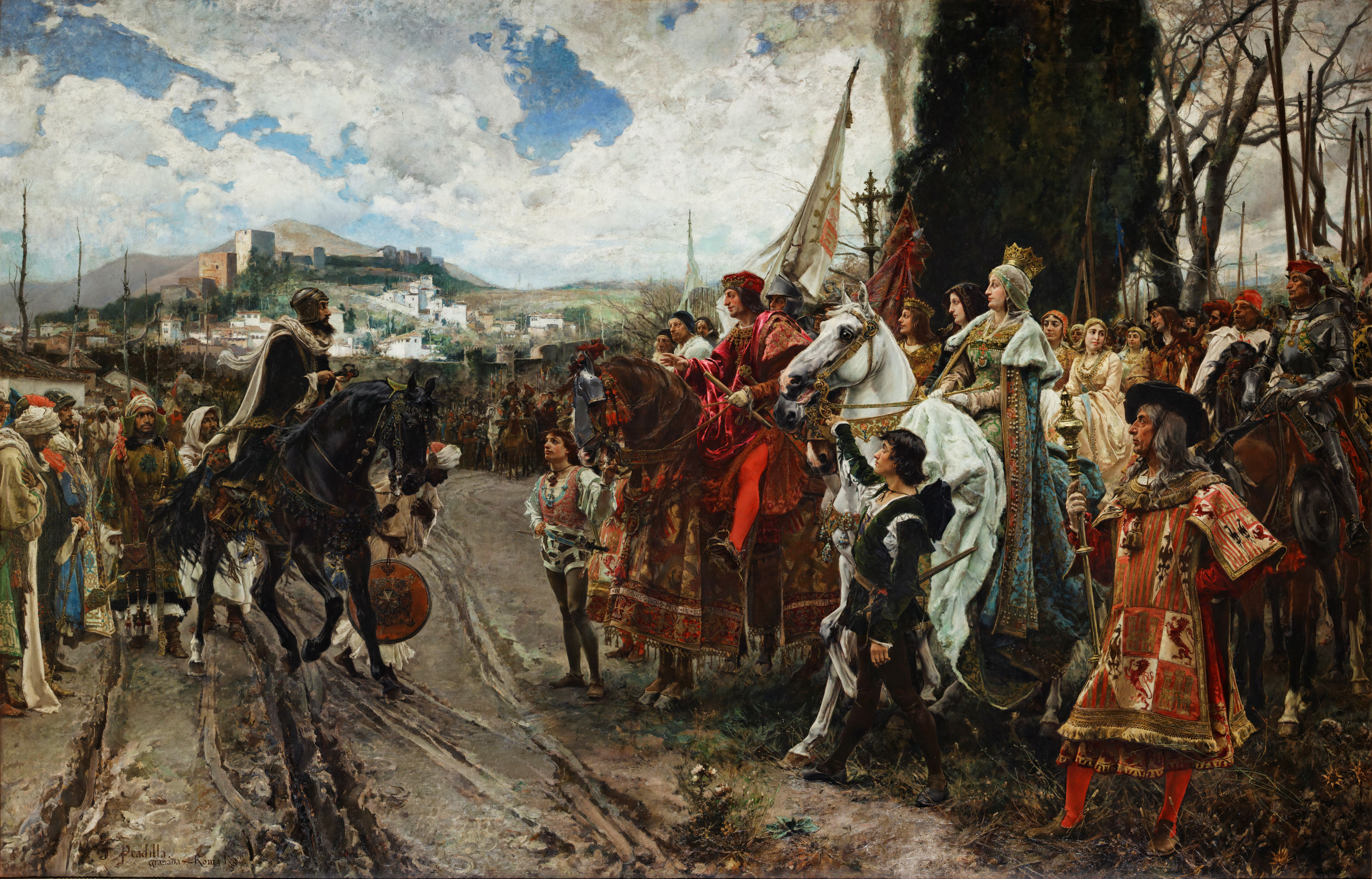
The Surrender of Granada by Francisco Pradilla Ortiz, 1882: Muhammad XI surrenders to Ferdinand and Isabella.

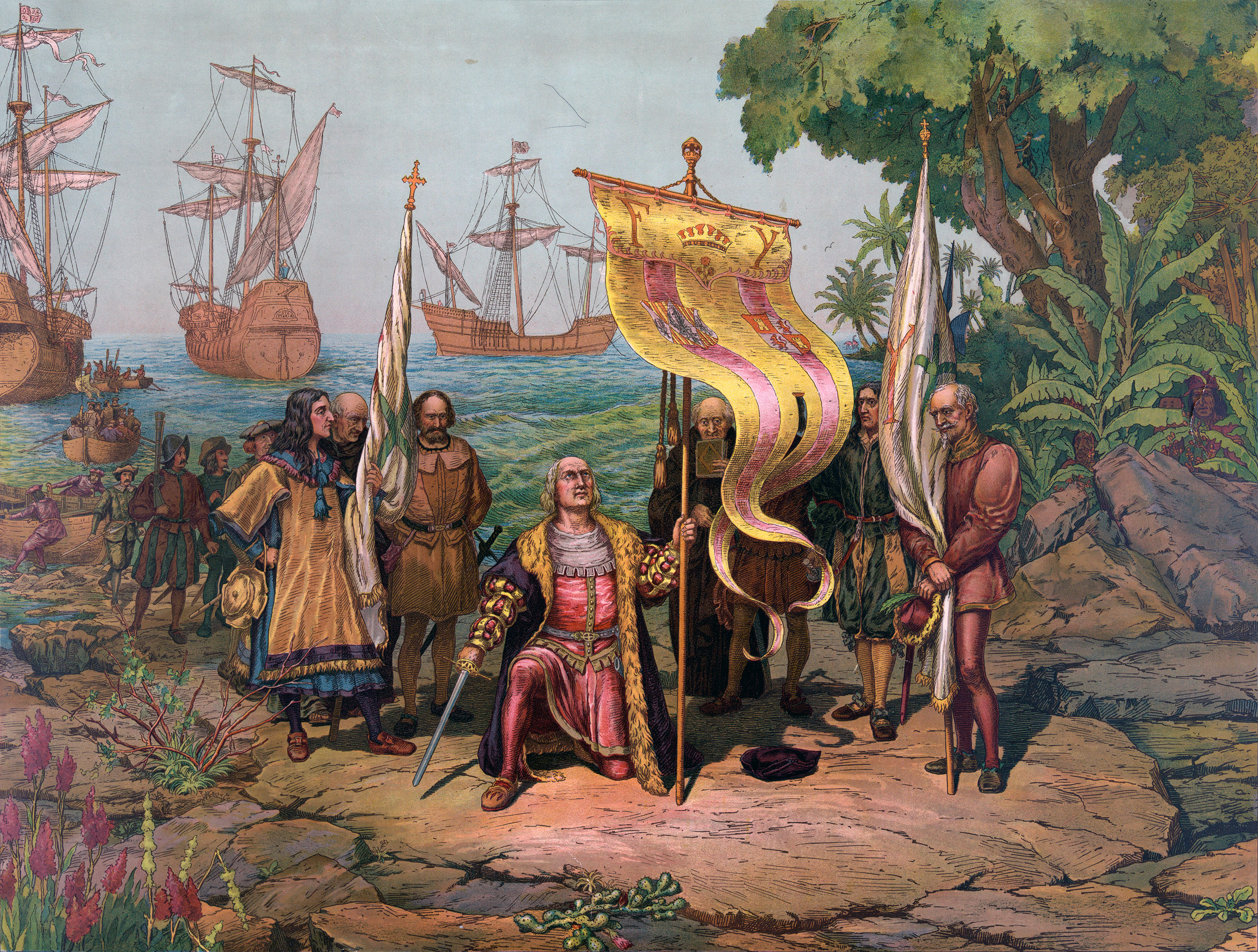
Gergio Deluci, Christopher Columbus arrives in the Americas in 1492, 1893 painting

The 15th century was the century which spans the Julian calendar dates from 1 January 1401 (represented by the Roman numerals MCDI) to 31 December 1500 (MD).

In Europe, the 15th century includes parts of the Late Middle Ages, the Early Renaissance, and the early modern period. Many technological, social and cultural developments of the 15th century can in retrospect be seen as heralding the "European miracle" of the following centuries. The architectural perspective, and the eastern fields which are known today as banking and accounting were founded in Italy.

The Hundred Years' War ended with a decisive French victory over the English in the Battle of Castillon. Financial troubles in England following the conflict resulted in the Wars of the Roses, a series of dynastic wars for the throne of England. The conflicts ended with the defeat of Richard III by Henry VII at the Battle of Bosworth Field, establishing the Tudor dynasty in the later part of the century.

Constantinople, known as the capital of the world and the capital of the Byzantine Empire, fell to the emerging Muslim Ottoman Turks, marking the end of the tremendously influential Byzantine Empire and, for some historians, the end of the Middle Ages. This led to the migration of Greek scholars and texts to Italy, while Johannes Gutenberg's invention of a mechanical movable type began the printing press. These two events played key roles in the development of the Renaissance. The Roman papacy was split in two parts in Europe for decades (the so-called Western Schism), until the Council of Constance. The division of the Catholic Church and the unrest associated with the Hussite movement would become factors in the rise of the Protestant Reformation in the following century.

Islamic Spain became dissolved through the Christian Reconquista, followed by the forced conversions and the Muslim rebellion, ending over seven centuries of Islamic rule and returning southern Spain to Christian rulers.

The spices, wines and precious metals of the Bengal Sultanate had attracted European traders to trade with Bengal, but the trade was subsequently lower, due to the rise of the Ottoman Empire, which introduced new taxes and tariffs against European traders. This had led to explorers like Christopher Columbus trying to find a route to reach India, which eventually reached the Americas. Vasco da Gama, a Portuguese explorer, found a route to reach to India from the African coast.

In Asia, the Timurid Empire collapsed and the Afghan Pashtun Lodi dynasty took control of the Delhi Sultanate. Under the rule of the Yongle Emperor, who built the Forbidden City and commanded Zheng He to explore the world overseas, the Ming dynasty's territory reached its pinnacle.

In Africa, the spread of Islam led to the collapse of the Christian kingdoms of Nubia, by the end of the century, leaving only Alodia (which was to collapse in 1504). The formerly vast Mali Empire teetered on the brink of collapse, under pressure from the rising Songhai Empire.

In the Americas, both the Aztec Empire and the Inca Empire reached the peak of their influence, but the voyages of Christopher Columbus and other European voyages of discovery in the Americas, beginning the European colonization of the Americas, changed the course of modern history.

== Events ==
=== 1401–1409 ===
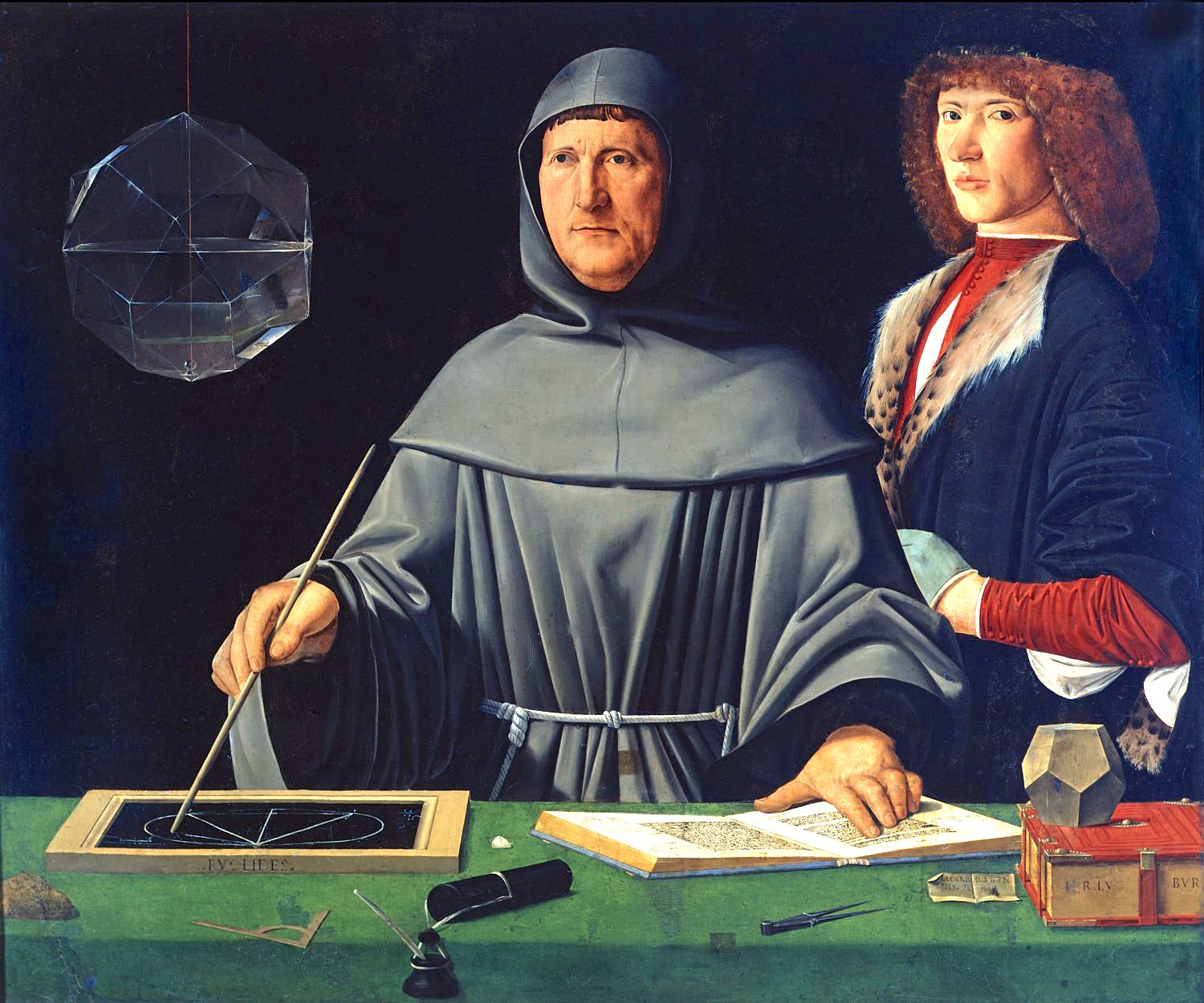
Portrait of the founder of accounting, Luca Pacioli, by Jacopo de' Barbari (Museo di Capodimonte)

- 1401: Dilawar Khan establishes the Malwa Sultanate in present-day central India.
- 1402: Ottoman and Timurid Empires fight at the Battle of Ankara resulting in the capture of Bayezid I by Timur.
- 1402: Sultanate of Malacca founded by Parameswara.
- 1402: The settlement of the Canary Islands signals the beginning of the Spanish Empire.
- 1403–1413: Ottoman Interregnum, a civil war between the four sons of Bayezid I.
- 1403: The Yongle Emperor moves the capital of China from Nanjing to Beijing.
- 1404–1406: Regreg War, Majapahit civil war of secession between Wikramawardhana against Wirabhumi.
- 1405: The Sultanate of Sulu is established by Sharif ul-Hāshim.
- 1405–1433: During the Ming treasure voyages, Admiral Zheng He of China sails through the Indian Ocean to Malacca, India, Ceylon, Persia, Arabia, and East Africa to spread China's influence and sovereignty. The first voyage, a massive Ming dynasty naval expedition ending in 1407, visited Java, Palembang, Malacca, Aru, Samudera and Lambri.
- 1408: The last recorded event to occur in the Norse settlements of Greenland was a wedding in Hvalsey in the Eastern Settlement in 1408.

=== 1410s ===
The Northern Yuan dynasty and Turco-Mongol residual states and domains by the 15th century

- 1410: The Battle of Grunwald is the decisive battle of the Polish–Lithuanian–Teutonic War leading to the downfall of the Teutonic Knights.
- 1410-1415: The last Welsh war of independence, led by Owain Glyndŵr.
- 1414: Khizr Khan, deputised by Timur to be the governor of Multan, takes over Delhi founding the Sayyid dynasty.
- 1415: Henry the Navigator leads the conquest of Ceuta from the Moors marking the beginning of the Portuguese Empire.
- 1415: Battle of Agincourt fought between the Kingdom of England and France.
- 1415: Jan Hus is burned at the stake as a heretic at the Council of Constance.
- 1417: A large goodwill mission led by three kings of Sulu, the Eastern King Paduka Pahala, the Western king Maharaja Kolamating and Cave king Paduka Prabhu as well as 340 members of their delegation, in what is now the southern Philippines, ploughed through the Pacific Ocean to China to pay tribute to the Yongle emperor of the Ming Dynasty.
- 1417: The East king of Sulu, Paduka Pahala, on their way home, suddenly died in Dezhou, a city in east China's Shandong province. The Yongle Emperor Zhu Di commissioned artisans to build a tomb for the king.
- 1419–1433: The Hussite Wars in Bohemia.

=== 1420s ===
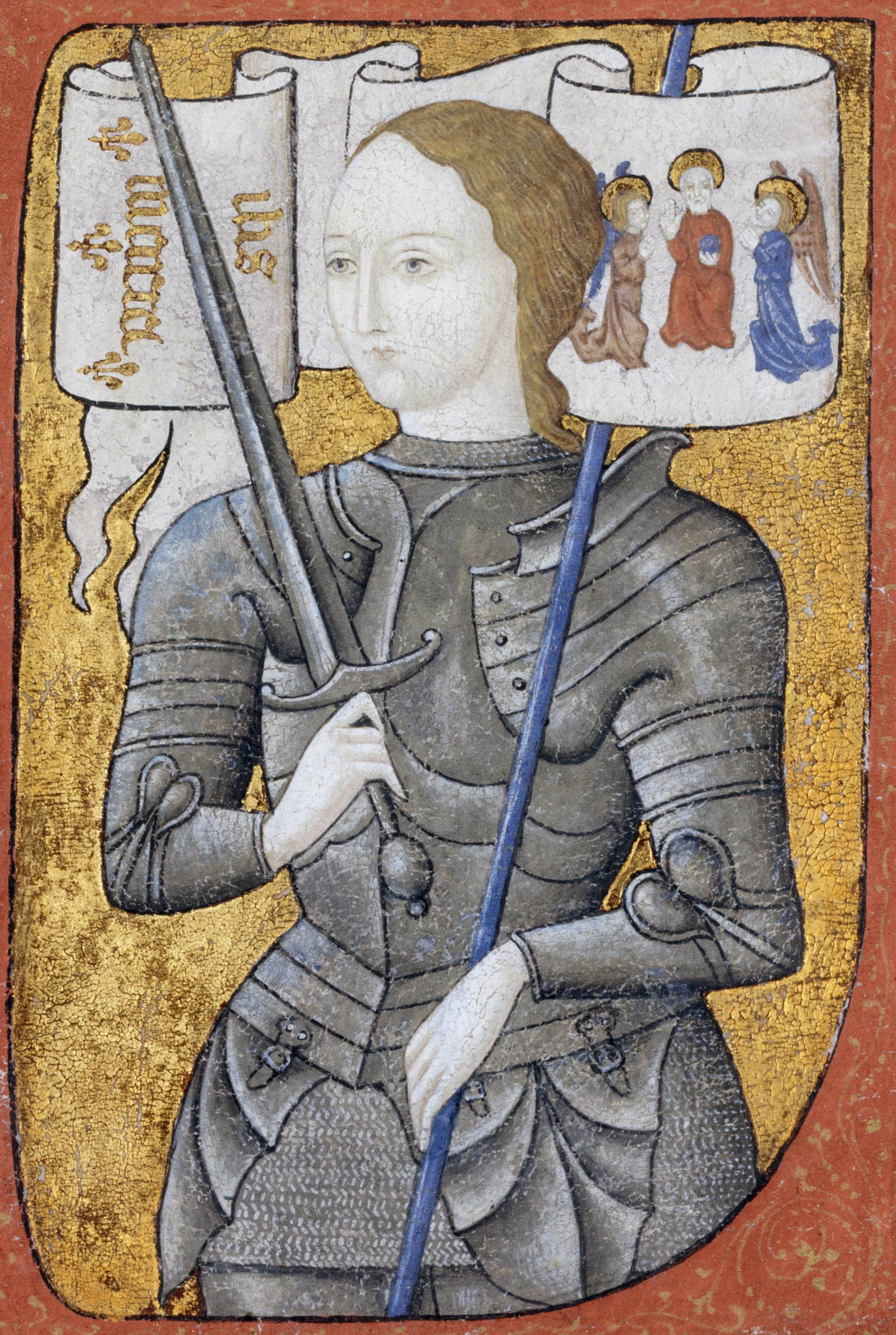
Joan of Arc, a French peasant girl, directly influenced the result of the Hundred Years' War.

- 1420: Construction of the Chinese Forbidden City is completed in Beijing.
- 1420: In Sub-saharan Africa the Ife Empire has collapsed.
- 1424: James I returns to Scotland after being held hostage under three Kings of England since 1406.
- 1424: Deva Raya II succeeds his father Veera Vijaya Bukka Raya as monarch of the Vijayanagara Empire.
- 1425: Catholic University of Leuven (Belgium) founded by Pope Martin V.
- 1427: Reign of Itzcoatl begins as the fourth tlatoani of Tenochtitlan and the first emperor of the Aztec Empire.
- 1429: Joan of Arc ends the Siege of Orléans and turns the tide of the Hundred Years' War.
- 1429: Queen Suhita succeeds her father Wikramawardhana as ruler of Majapahit.

=== 1430s ===
- 1430: Rajah Lontok and Dayang Kalangitan become co-regent rulers of the ancient kingdom of Tondo.
- 1431
  - 9 January – Pretrial investigations for Joan of Arc begin in Rouen, France, under English occupation.
  - 3 March – Pope Eugene IV succeeds Pope Martin V, to become the 207th pope.
  - 26 March – The trial of Joan of Arc begins.
  - 30 May – Nineteen-year-old Joan of Arc is burned at the stake.
  - 16 June – the Teutonic Knights and Švitrigaila sign the Treaty of Christmemel, creating anti-Polish alliance
  - September – Battle of Inverlochy: Donald Balloch defeats the Royalists.
  - 30 October – Treaty of Medina del Campo, consolidating peace between Portugal and Castille.
  - 16 December – Henry VI of England is crowned King of France.
- 1434: The Catholics and Utraquists defeat the Taborites at the Battle of Lipany, ending the Hussite Wars.
- 1438: Pachacuti founds the Inca Empire.

=== 1440s ===
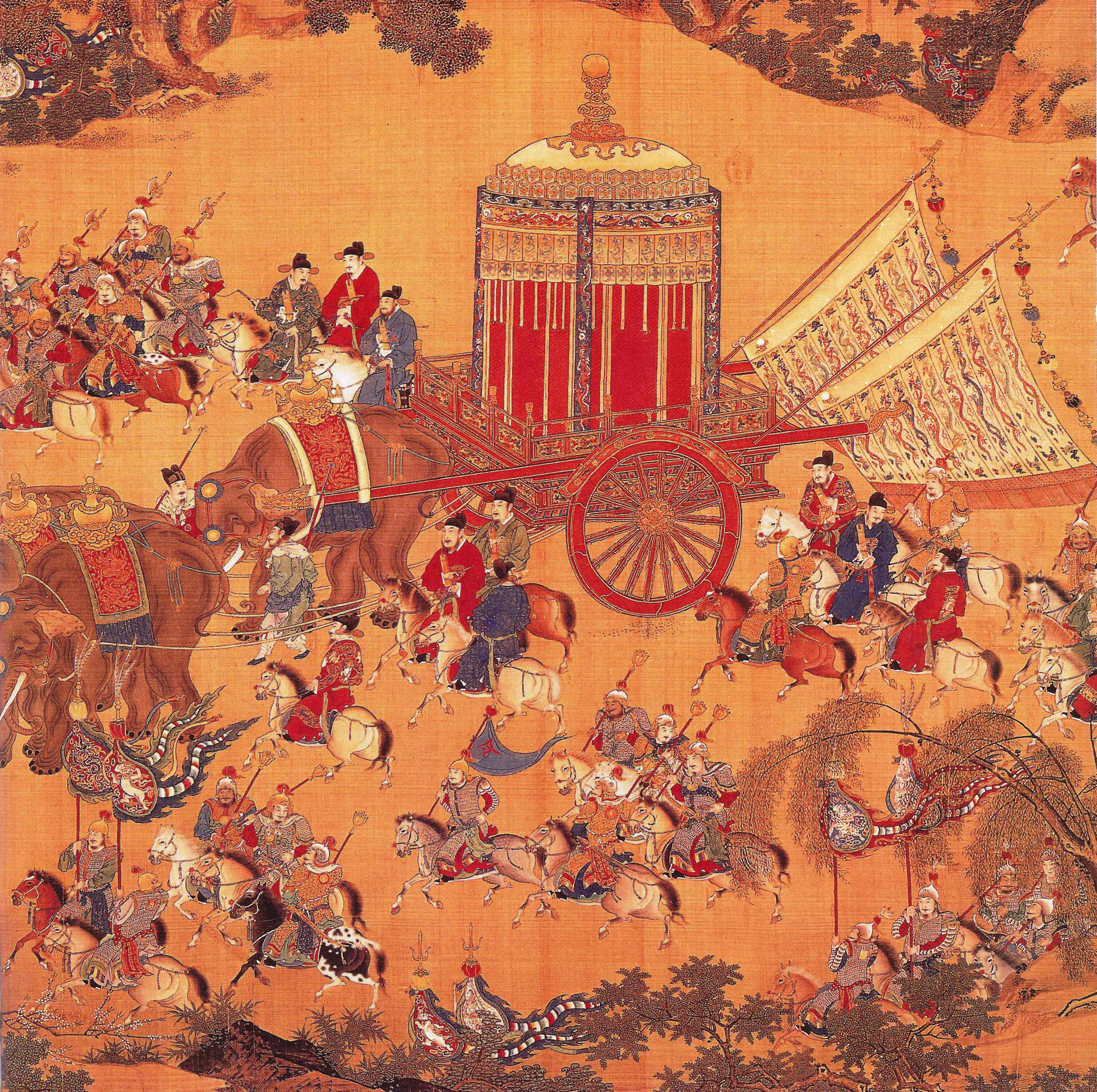
Detail of The Emperor's Approach showing the Xuande Emperor's royal carriage. Ming dynasty of China.

- 1440: Eton College founded by Henry VI.
- 1440s: The Golden Horde breaks up into the Siberia Khanate, the Khanate of Kazan, the Astrakhan Khanate, the Crimean Khanate, and the Great Horde.
- 1440–1469: Under Moctezuma I, the Aztecs become the dominant power in Mesoamerica.
- 1440: Oba Ewuare comes to power in the West African city of Benin, and turns it into an empire.
- 1440: Reign of Moctezuma I begins as the fifth tlatoani of Tenochtitlan and emperor of the Aztec Empire.
- 1441: Jan van Eyck, Flemish painter, dies.
- 1441: Portuguese navigators cruise West Africa and reestablish the European slave trade with a shipment of African slaves sent directly from Africa to Portugal.
- 1441: A civil war between the Tutul Xiues and Cocom breaks out in the League of Mayapan. As a consequence, the league begins to disintegrate.
- 1442: Leonardo Bruni defines Middle Ages and Modern times.
- 1443: Abdur Razzaq visits India.
- 1443: King Sejong the Great publishes the hangul, the native phonetic alphabet system for the Korean language.
- 1444: The Albanian league is established in Lezha, Skanderbeg is elected leader. A war begins against the Ottoman Empire. An Albanian state is set up and lasts until 1479.
- 1444: Ottoman Empire under Sultan Murad II defeats the Polish and Hungarian armies under Władysław III of Poland and János Hunyadi at the Battle of Varna.
- 1445: The Kazan Khanate defeats the Grand Principality of Moscow at the Battle of Suzdal.
- 1445: Rai Sahra establishes the Multan Sultanate in present-day Pakistan.
- 1446: Mallikarjuna Raya succeeds his father Deva Raya II as monarch of the Vijayanagara Empire.
- 1447: Wijaya Parakrama Wardhana, succeeds Suhita as ruler of Majapahit.
- 1449: Saint Srimanta Sankardeva was born.
- 1449: Esen Tayisi leads an Oirat Mongol invasion of China which culminate in the capture of the Zhengtong Emperor at Battle of Tumu Fortress.

=== 1450s ===
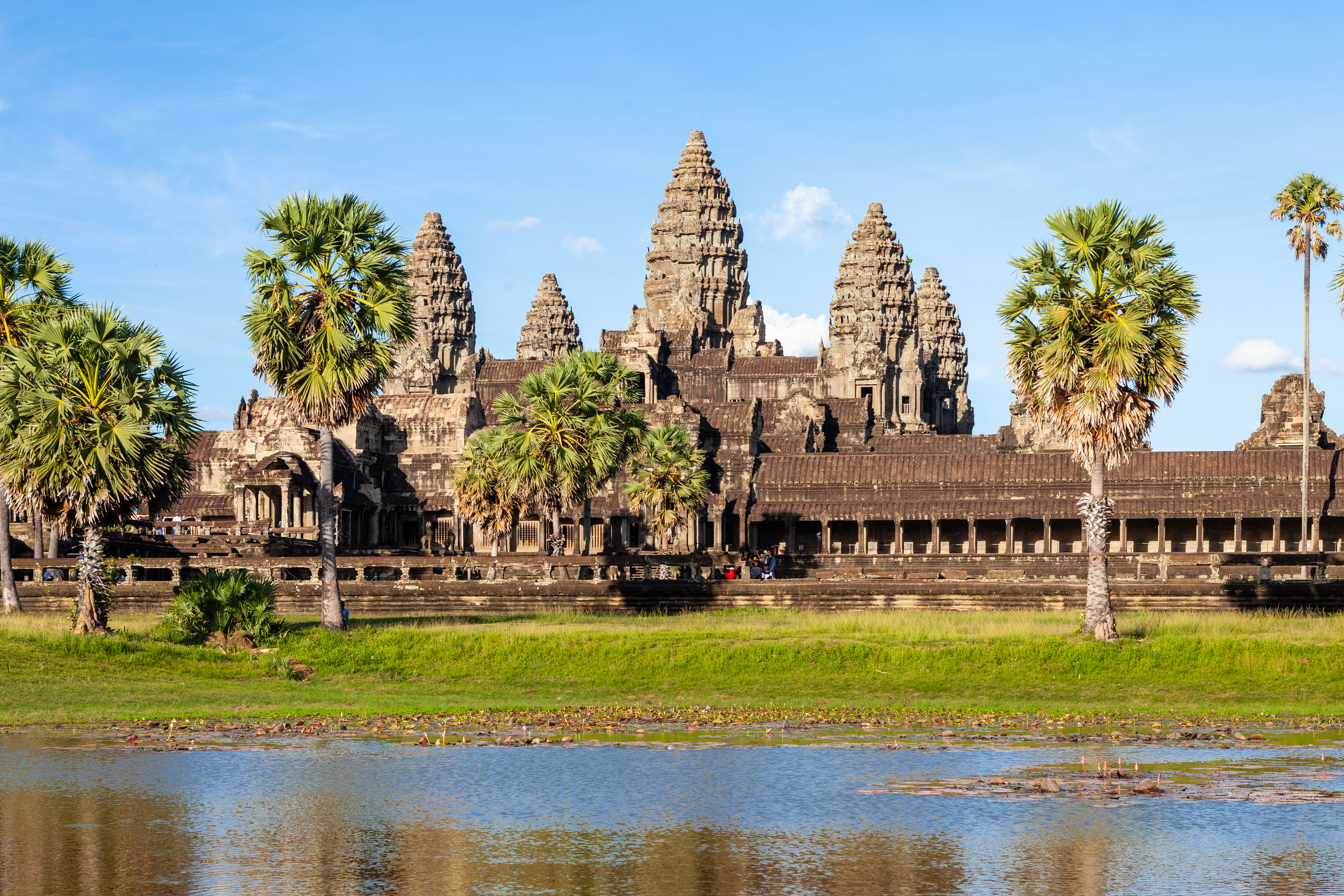
Angkor, the capital of the Khmer Empire, was abandoned in the 15th century.

- 1450s: Machu Picchu constructed.
- 1450: Dayang Kalangitan became the Queen regnant of the ancient kingdom of Tondo that started Tondo's political dominance over Luzon.
- 1451: Bahlul Khan Lodhi ascends the throne of the Delhi sultanate starting the Lodhi dynasty
- 1451: Rajasawardhana, born Bhre Pamotan, styled Brawijaya II succeeds Wijayaparakramawardhana as ruler of Majapahit.
- 1453: The Fall of Constantinople marks the end of the Byzantine Empire and the death of the last Roman Emperor Constantine XI and the beginning of the Classical Age of the Ottoman Empire.
- 1453: The Battle of Castillon is the last engagement of the Hundred Years' War and the first battle in European history where cannons were a major factor in deciding the battle.
- 1453: Reign of Rajasawardhana ends.
- 1454–1466: After defeating the Teutonic Knights in the Thirteen Years' War, Poland annexes Royal Prussia.
- 1455–1485: Wars of the Roses – English civil war between the House of York and the House of Lancaster.
- 1456: Joan of Arc is posthumously acquitted of heresy by the Catholic Church, redeeming her status as the heroine of France.
- 1456: The Siege of Belgrade halts the Ottomans' advance into Europe.
- 1456: Girishawardhana, styled Brawijaya III, becomes ruler of Majapahit.
- 1457: Construction of Edo Castle begins.

=== 1460s ===
The seventeen Kuchkabals of Yucatán after The League of Mayapan in 1461

- 1461: The League of Mayapan disintegrates. The league is replaced by seventeen Kuchkabal.
- 1461: The city of Sarajevo is founded by the Ottomans.
- 1461:
  - 2 February – Battle of Mortimer's Cross: Yorkist troops led by Edward, Duke of York defeat Lancastrians under Owen Tudor and his son Jasper Tudor, Earl of Pembroke in Wales.
  - 17 February – Second Battle of St Albans, England: The Earl of Warwick's army is defeated by a Lancastrian force under Queen Margaret, who recovers control of her husband.
  - 4 March – The Duke of York seizes London and proclaims himself King Edward IV.
  - 5 March – Henry VI of England is deposed by the Duke of York during war of the Roses.
  - 29 March – Battle of Towton: Edward IV defeats Queen Margaret to make good his claim to the English throne (thought to be the bloodiest battle ever fought in England).
  - 28 June – Edward, Richard of York's son, is crowned as Edward IV, King of England (reigns until 1483).
  - July – Byzantine general Graitzas Palaiologos honourably surrenders Salmeniko Castle, last garrison of the Despotate of the Morea, to invading forces of the Ottoman Empire after a year-long siege.
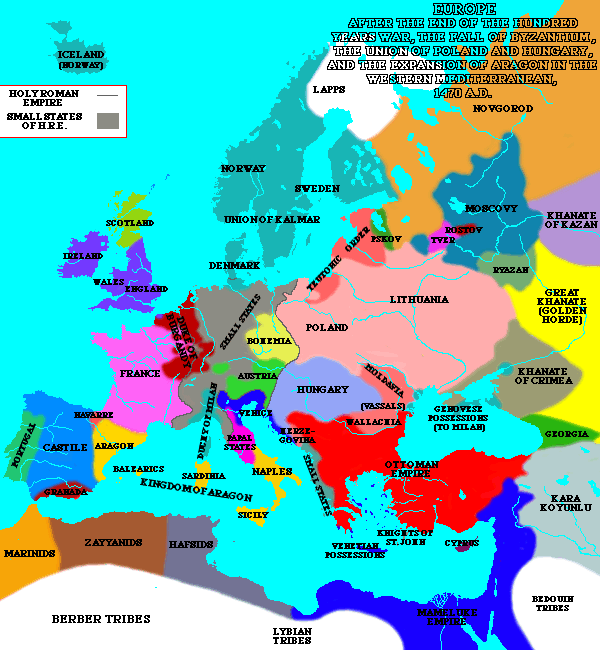
    Political map of Europe in 1470
  - 22 July – Louis XI succeeds Charles VII of France as king (reigns until 1483).
- 1462: Sonni Ali Ber, the ruler of the Songhai (or Songhay) Empire, along the Niger River, conquers Mali in the central Sudan by defeating the Tuareg contingent at Tombouctou (or Timbuktu) and capturing the city. He develops both his own capital, Gao, and the main centres of Mali, Timbuktu and Djenné, into major cities. Ali Ber controls trade along the Niger River with a navy of war vessels.
- 1462: Mehmed the Conqueror is driven back by Wallachian prince Vlad III Dracula at The Night Attack.
- 1464: Edward IV of England secretly marries Elizabeth Woodville.
- 1465: The 1465 Moroccan revolt ends in the murder of the last Marinid Sultan of Morocco Abd al-Haqq II.
- 1466: Singhawikramawardhana, succeeds Girishawardhana as ruler of Majapahit.
- 1467: Uzun Hasan defeats the Black Sheep Turkoman leader Jahān Shāh.
- 1467–1615: The Sengoku period is one of civil war in Japan.
- 1469: The marriage of Ferdinand II of Aragon and Isabella I of Castile leads to the unification of Spain.
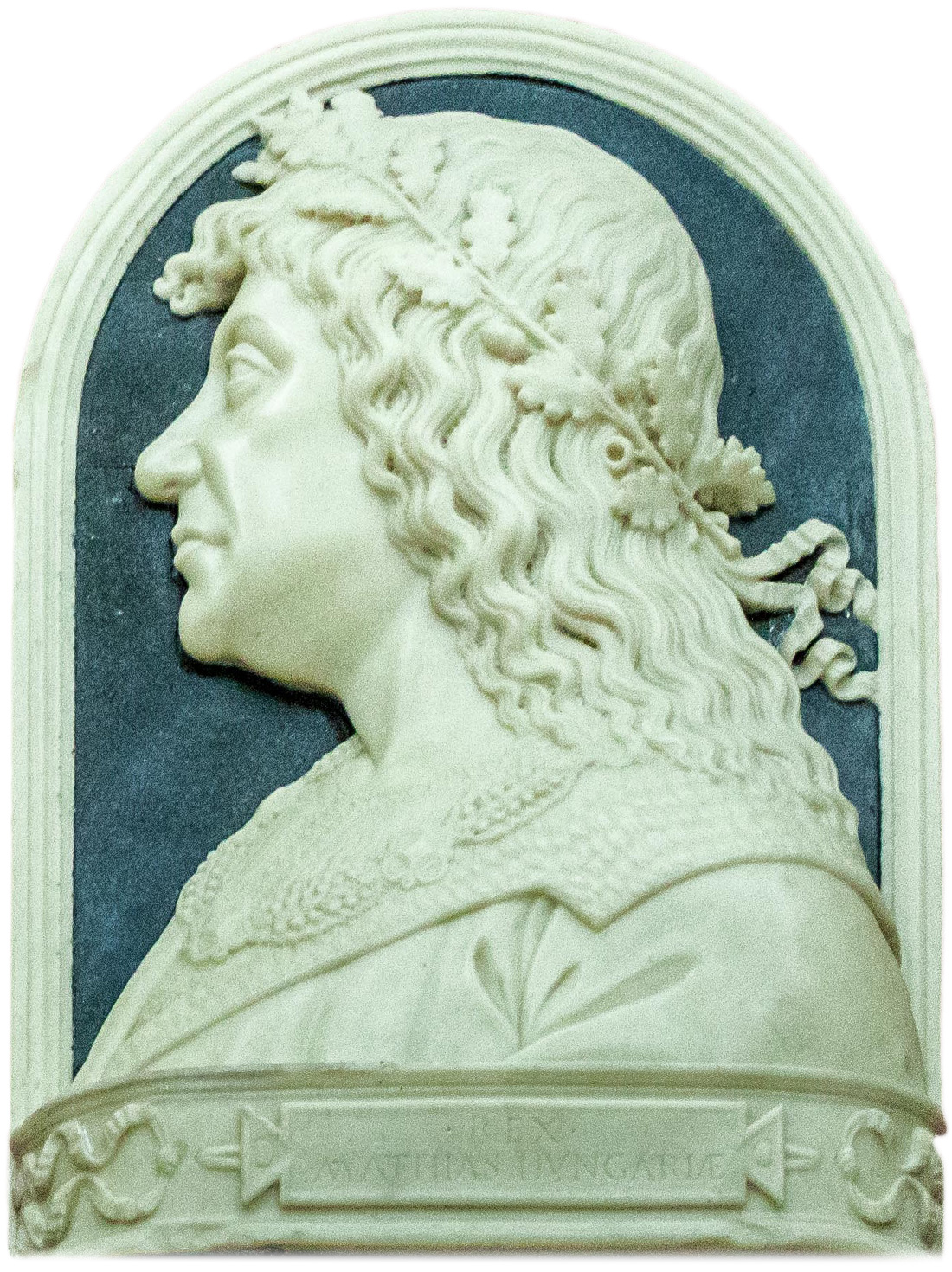
  The renaissance king Matthias Corvinus of Hungary. His mercenary standing army (the Black Army) had the strongest military potential of its era.
- 1469: Matthias Corvinus of Hungary conquers some parts of Bohemia.
- 1469: Birth of Guru Nanak Dev. Beside followers of Sikhism, Guru Nanak is revered by Hindus and Muslim Sufis across the Indian subcontinent.
- 1469: Reign of Axayacatl begins in the Aztec capital of Tenochtitlan as the sixth tlatoani and emperor of the Aztec Triple Alliance.

=== 1470s ===
- 1470: The Moldavian forces under Stephen the Great defeat the Tatars of the Golden Horde at the Battle of Lipnic.
- 1471: The kingdom of Champa suffers a massive defeat by the Vietnamese king Lê Thánh Tông.
- 1472: Abu Abd Allah al-Sheikh Muhammad ibn Yahya becomes the first Wattasid Sultan of Morocco.
- 1474–1477: Burgundy Wars of France, Switzerland, Lorraine and Sigismund II of Habsburg against the Charles the Bold, Duke of Burgundy.
- 1478: Muscovy conquers Novgorod.
- 1478: Reign of Singhawikramawardhana ends.
- 1478: The Great Mosque of Demak is the oldest mosque in Java, built by the Wali Songo during the reign of Sultan Raden Patah.
- 1479: Battle of Breadfield, Matthias Corvinus of Hungary defeated the Turks.
- 1479: JagatGuru Vallabhacharya Ji Mahaprabhu was born

=== 1480s ===
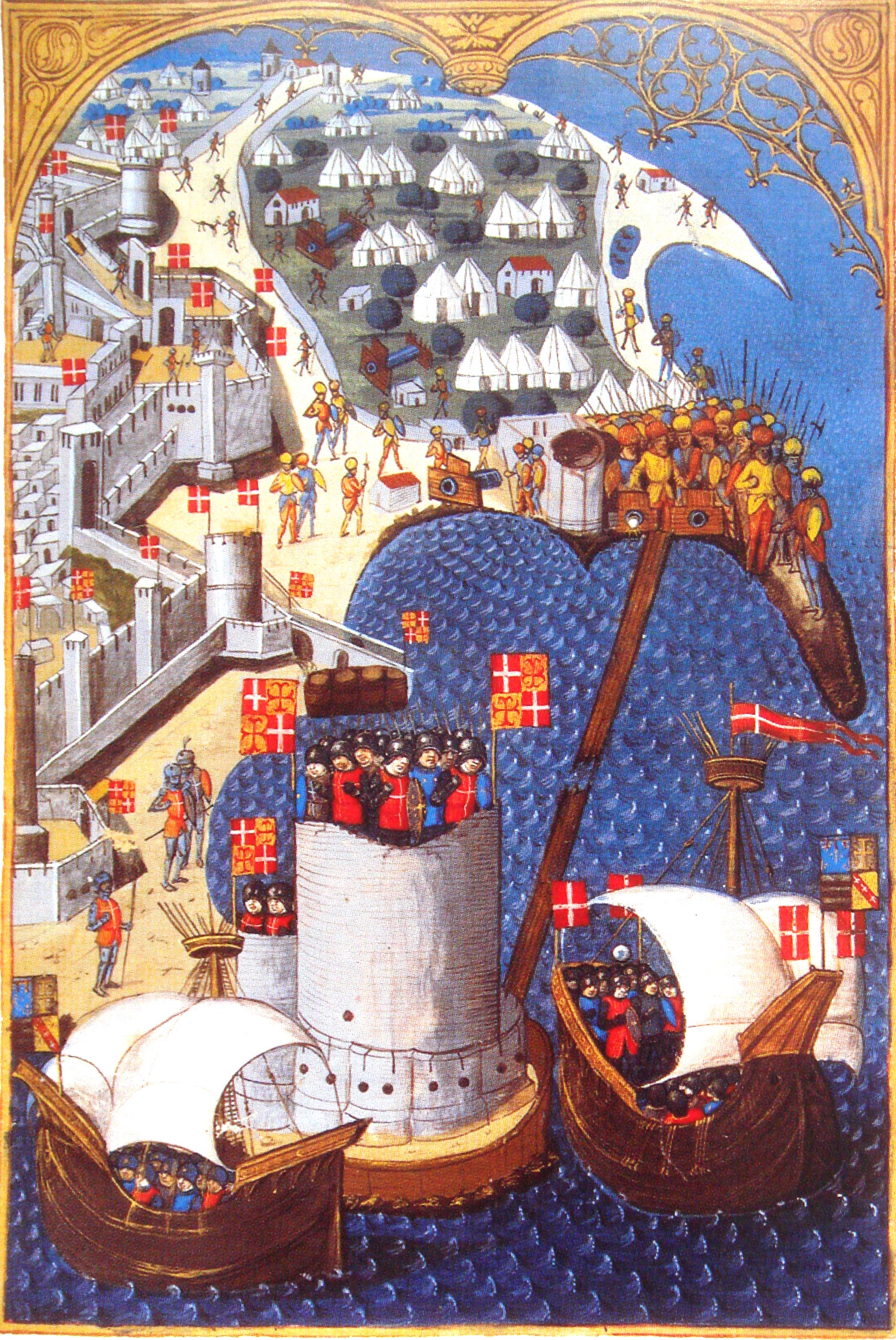
The Siege of Rhodes (1480). Ships of the Hospitaliers in the forefront, and Turkish camp in the background.

- 1480: After the Great standing on the Ugra river, Muscovy gained independence from the Great Horde.
- 1481: Spanish Inquisition begins in practice with the first auto-da-fé.
- 1481: Reign of Tizoc begins as the seventh tlatoani of Tenochtitlan and the emperor of the Aztec Triple Alliance.
- 1482: Portuguese navigator Diogo Cão becomes the first European to enter the Congo.
- 1483: The Jews are expelled from Andalusia.
- 1483: Pluto moves inside Neptune's orbit until July 23, 1503, according to modern orbital calculations.
- 1484: William Caxton, the first printer of books in English, prints his translation of Aesop's Fables in London.
- 1485: Matthias Corvinus of Hungary captured Vienna, Frederick III, Holy Roman Emperor ran away.
- 1485: Henry VII defeats Richard III at the Battle of Bosworth and becomes King of England.
- 1485: Ivan III of Russia conquered Tver.
- 1485: Saluva Narasimha Deva Raya drives out Praudha Raya ending the Sangama Dynasty.
- 1486: Sher Shah Suri, is born in Sasaram, Bihar.
- 1486: Reign of Ahuitzotl begins as the eighth tlatoani of Tenochtitlan and emperor of the Aztec Triple Alliance.
- 1487: Hongzhi Emperor ascends the throne, bringing Confucian ideology under his administration.
- 1488: Portuguese Navigator Bartolomeu Dias sails around the Cape of Good Hope.

=== 1490–1500 ===
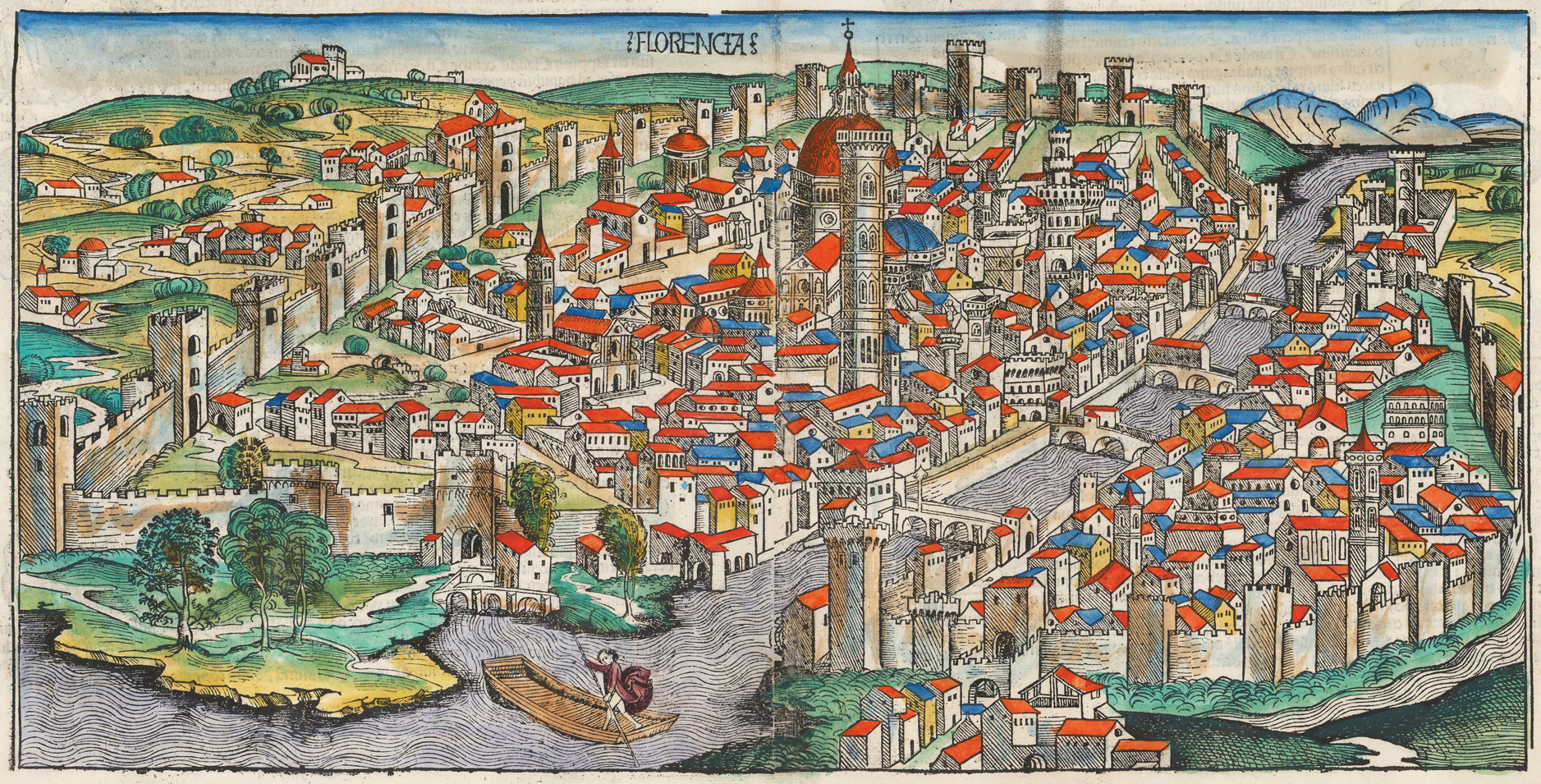
View of Florence, birthplace of the Renaissance, in a 1493 woodcut from Hartmann Schedel's Nuremberg Chronicle

- 1492: The death of Sunni Ali Ber left a leadership void in the Songhai Empire, and his son was soon dethroned by Mamadou Toure who ascended the throne in 1493 under the name Askia (meaning "general") Muhammad. Askia Muhammad made Songhai the largest empire in the history of West Africa. The empire went into decline, however, after 1528, when the now-blind Askia Muhammad was dethroned by his son, Askia Musa.
- 1492: Boabdil's surrender of Granada marks the end of the Spanish Reconquista and Al-Andalus.
- 1492: Ferdinand and Isabella sign the Alhambra Decree, expelling all Jews from Spain unless they convert to Catholicism; 40,000–200,000 leave.
- 1492: Christopher Columbus landed in the Americas from Spain.
- 1493: Christopher Columbus landed on modern-day Puerto Rico.
- 1493: Leonardo da Vinci creates the first known design for a helicopter.
- 1494: Spain and Portugal sign the Treaty of Tordesillas and agree to divide the World outside of Europe between themselves.
- 1494–1559: The Italian Wars lead to the downfall of the Italian city-states.
- 1495: Manuel I succeeds John II as the king of Portugal (reigns until 1521).
- 1497–1499: Vasco da Gama's first voyage from Europe to India and back.
- 1499: Ottoman fleet defeats Venetians at the Battle of Zonchio.
- 1499: University "Alcalá de Henares" in Madrid, Spain is built.
- 1499: Michelangelo's Pietà in St. Peter's Basilica is made in Rome
- 1500: Islam becomes the dominant religion across the Indonesian archipelago.
- 1500: in an effort to increase his power. Bolkiah founded the city of Selurong—later named Maynila, on the other side of the Pasig River shortly after taking over Tondo from its monarch, Lakan Gambang.
- 1500: Around late 15th century Bujangga Manik manuscript was composed, tell the story of Jaya Pakuan Bujangga Manik, a Sundanese Hindu hermit journeys throughout Java and Bali.
- 1500: Charles of Ghent (future Lord of the Netherlands, King of Spain, Archduke of Austria, and Holy Roman Emperor) was born.
- 1500: Guru Nanak begins the spreading of Sikhism, the fifth-largest religion in the world.
- 1500: Spanish navigator Vicente Yáñez Pinzón encounters Brazil but is prevented from claiming it by the Treaty of Tordesillas.
- 1500: Portuguese navigator Pedro Álvares Cabral claims Brazil for Portugal.
- 1500: The Ottoman fleet of Kemal Reis defeats the Venetians at the Second Battle of Lepanto.

== Gallery ==
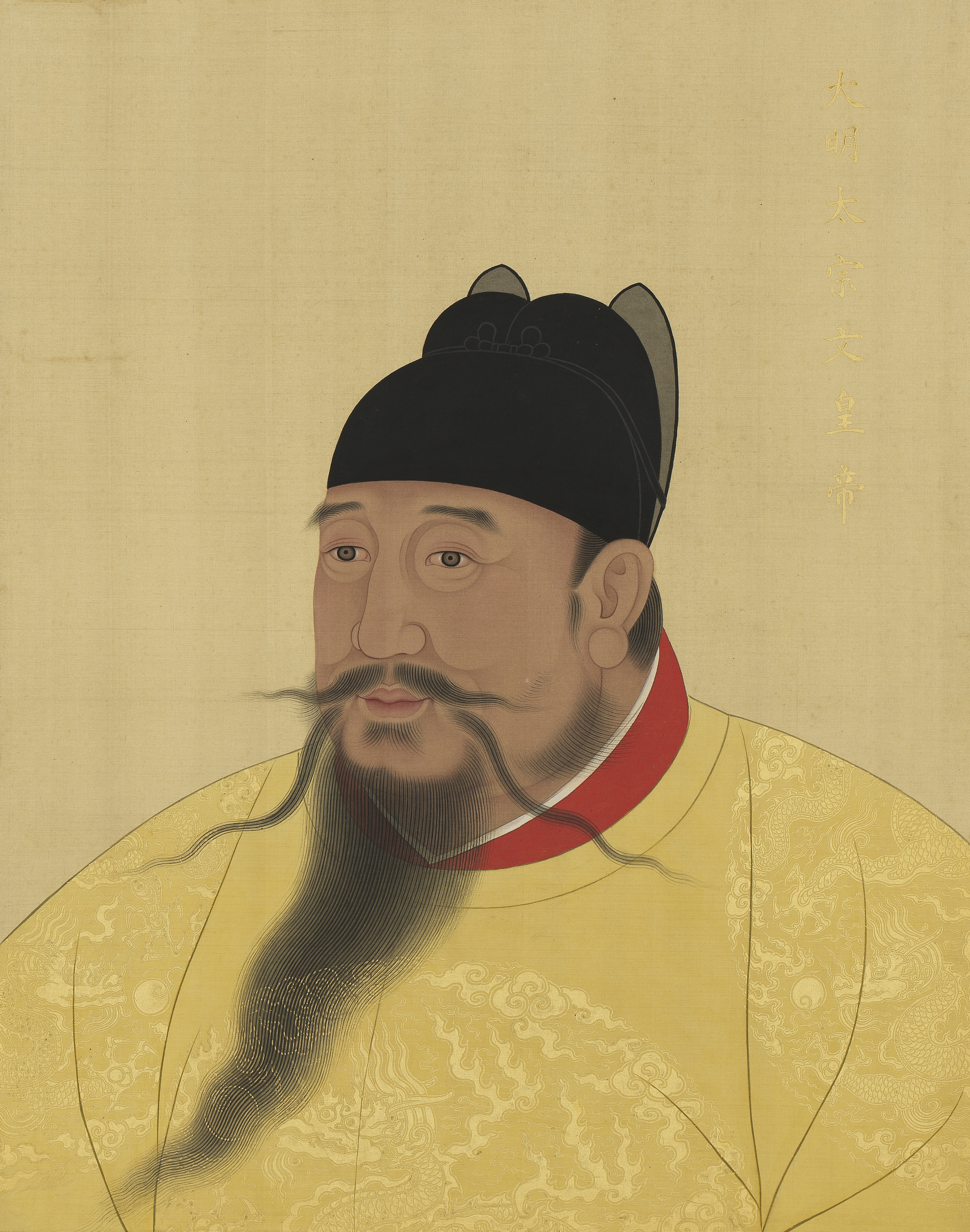
The Yongle Emperor (1360–1424) raised the Ming Empire to its highest power. Launched campaigns against the Mongols and reestablished Chinese rule in Vietnam.

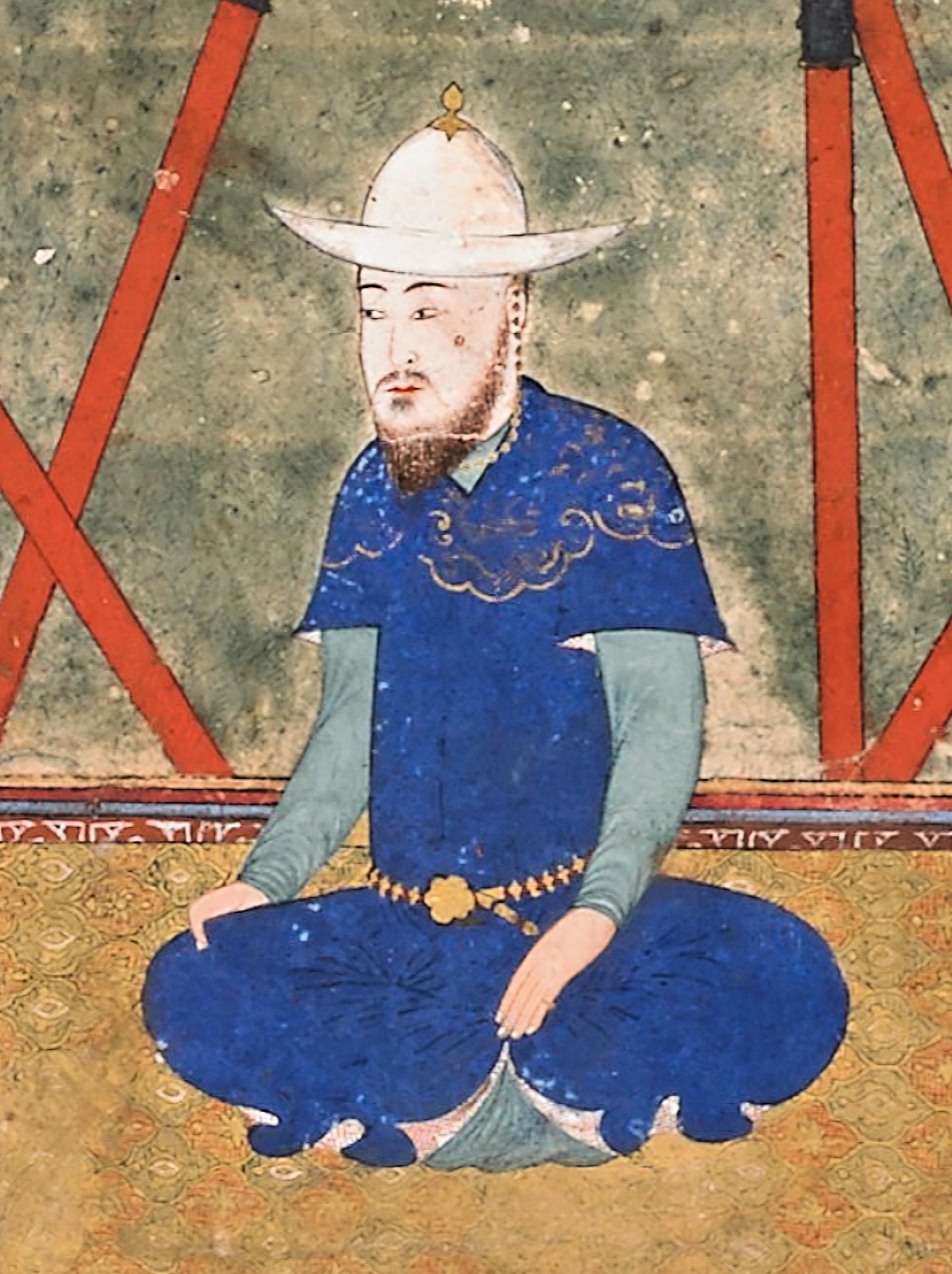
Ulugh Beg (1394–1449), Timurid sultan who oversaw the cultural peak of the Timurid Renaissance

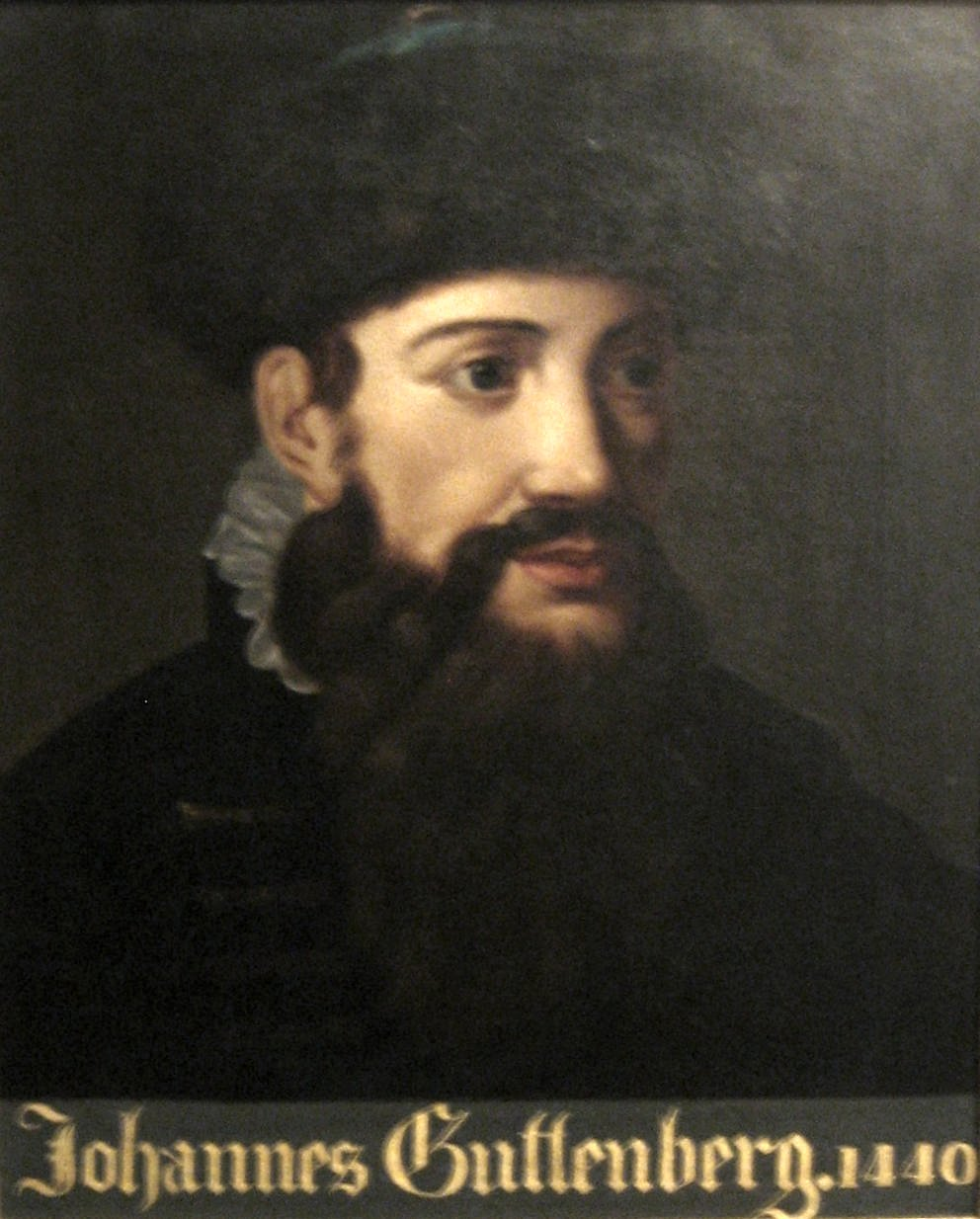
Johannes Gutenberg (1400–1468), German inventor who introduced printing to Europe with his mechanical movable-type printing press

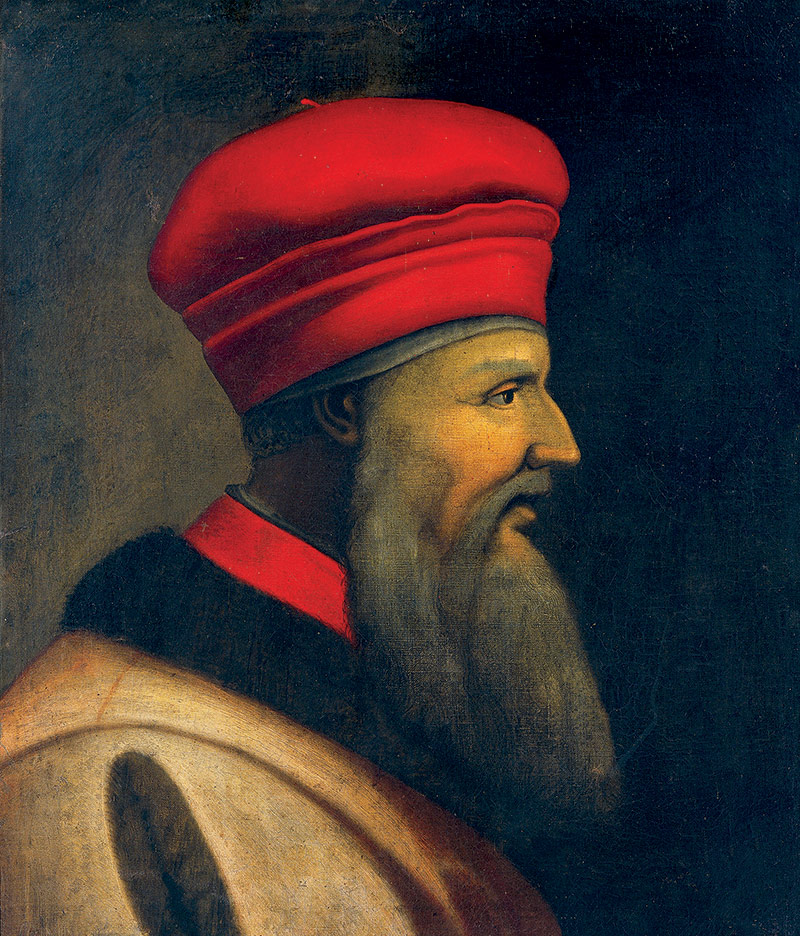
Skanderbeg (1405–1468), who led the Albanian resistance against the Ottoman Empire

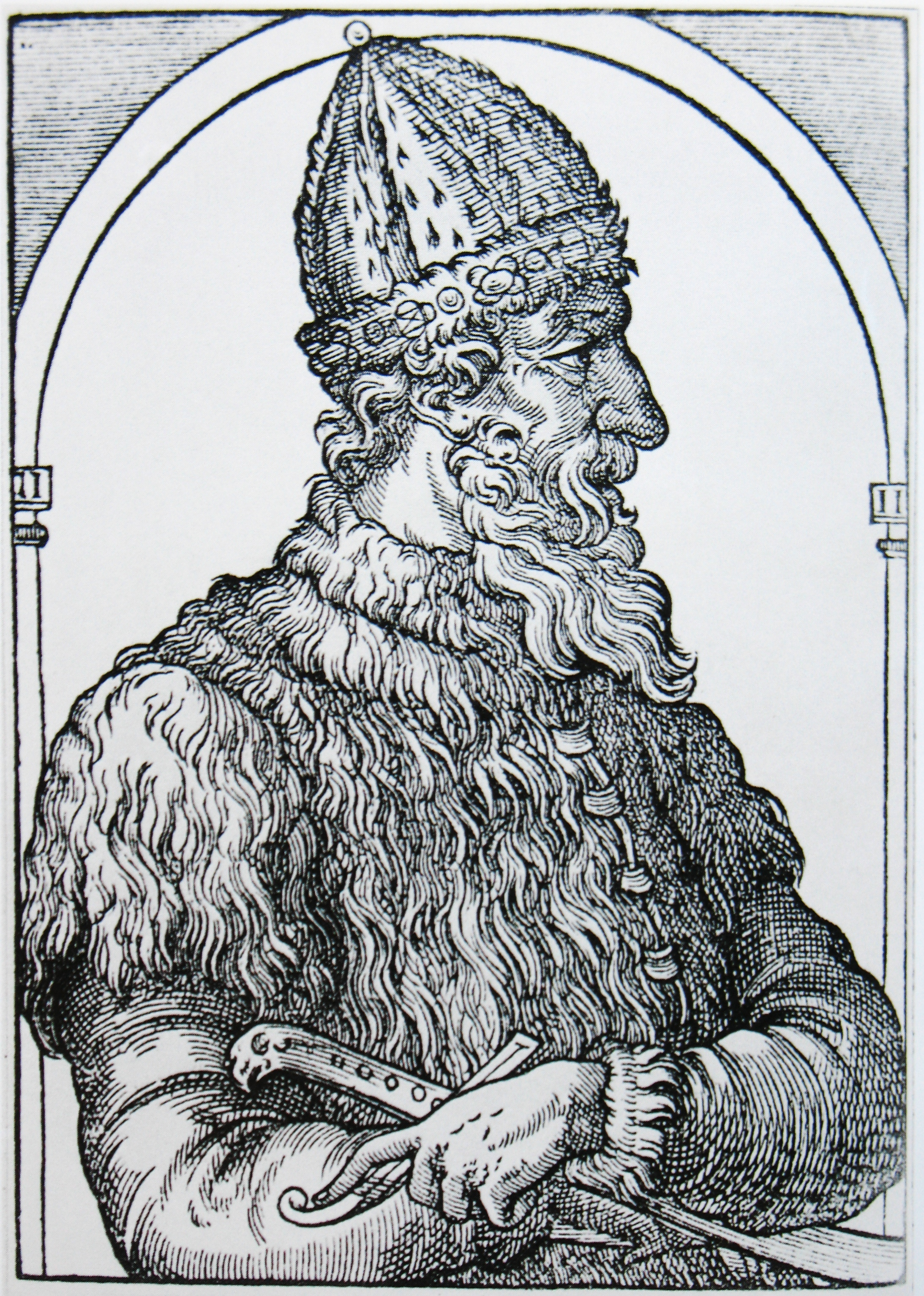
Ivan III of Russia (1440–1505), Grand Prince of Moscow who ended the dominance of the Tatars in the lands of the Rus

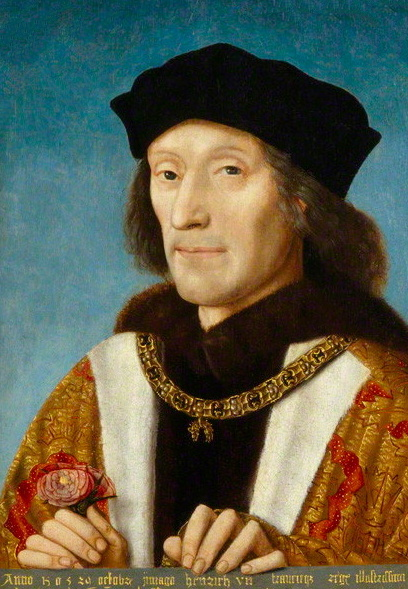
King Henry VII (1457–1509), the founder of the royal house of Tudor

== Inventions, discoveries, introductions ==
- Renaissance affects philosophy, science and art.
- Rise of Modern English language from Middle English.
- Introduction of the noon bell in the Catholic world.
- Public banks.
- Yongle Encyclopedia—over 22,000 volumes.
- Hangul alphabet in Korea.
- Scotch whisky.
- Psychiatric hospitals.
- Development of the woodcut for printing between 1400–1450.
- Movable type first used by King Taejong of Joseon—1403. (Movable type, which allowed individual characters to be arranged to form words, was invented in China by Bi Sheng between 1041 and 1048.)
- Although pioneered earlier in Korea and by the Chinese official Wang Zhen (with tin), bronze metal movable type printing is created in China by Hua Sui in 1490.
- Johannes Gutenberg advances the printing press in Europe (c. 1455)
- Linear perspective drawing perfected by Filippo Brunelleschi 1410–1415
- Invention of the harpsichord c. 1450
- Arrival of Christopher Columbus to the Americas in 1492.

== Sources ==
- Langer, William. An Encyclopedia of World History (5th ed. 1973); highly detailed outline of events online free
- Febvre, Lucien; Martin, Henri-Jean (1997), The Coming of the Book: The Impact of Printing 1450–1800, London: Verso, ISBN 1-85984-108-2
- Eisenstein, Elizabeth L. (1980), The Printing Press as an Agent of Change, Cambridge University Press, ISBN 0-521-29955-1
- Tolley, Thomas (2001). "Eyck, Barthélemy d'". In Hugh Brigstocke (ed.). The Oxford Companion to Western Art. Oxford: Oxford University Press. ISBN 0-19-866203-3.
- Harvey, L. P. (16 May 2005). Muslims in Spain, 1500 to 1614. Chicago: University of Chicago Press. ISBN 978-0-226-31963-6.
- Man, John (2002), The Gutenberg Revolution: The Story of a Genius and an Invention that Changed the World, London: Headline Review, ISBN 978-0-7472-4504-9
- McLuhan, Marshall (1962), The Gutenberg Galaxy: The Making of Typographic Man (1st ed.), University of Toronto Press, OCLC 428949
