= Nagarawardhani =

Çri Nagarawarddani
- Bhre Wirabhumi; Bhre Lasem Sang Alemu

2nd Princess of Lasem
- Reign: c. 1375 – 1400
- Predecessor: Rajasaduhitendudewi
- Successor: Kusumawardhani

1st Princess of Wirabhumi
- Reign: ? – c. 1375
- Successor: Nagarawardhani's husband
- Died: 1400; Kingdom of Majapahit
- Spouse: 2nd Prince of Wirabhumi
- Issue: 1st Prince of Pakembangan; Princess of Mataram; 5th Princess of Lasem; Princess of Matahun
- House: Rajasa
- Father: Singhawardhana, 1st Prince of Paguhan (biological); Rajasawardhana, 1st Prince of Matahun (adoptive)
- Mother: Rajasaduhiteswari, 1st Princess of Pajang (biological); Rajasaduhitendudewi, 2nd Princess of Daha (adoptive)

Nagarawardhani was the niece of King Majapahit, Hayam Wuruk.

== Early life ==
According to the book of Nagarakretagama, she was the daughter of Bhre Lasem, possibly Princess Indudevi.

The Princess of Lasem had a beautiful daughter, Princess Nagarawardhani, residing as princess consort of the Prince of Wirabhumi...

— Mpu Prapanca, Nagarakretagama, Canto 6, Stanza 3

However, according to the book of Pararaton, she was the daughter of the King's sister, Princess Isywari, also known as Bhre Pajang.

The Princess of Pajang had three children: Bhra Hyang Wisesa married to The Fair Princess of Lasem, had a son Hyang Wekasing Sukha; had a daughter whose The Fat Princess of Lasem, married to Prince of Wirabhumi; and another daughter was The Princess of Kahuripan.

— Pararaton

== Marriage ==
Nagarawardhani lived in the days of Bubat War when Hayam Wuruk fought against the Kingdom of Padjadjaran to compete for Padjadjaran princess, Dyah Pitaloka.

Nagarawardhani was later married to Bhre Wirabhumi, also the son of King Hayam Wuruk whose mother was one of the royal concubines. Nagarawardhani also known as Be Laem Alemu, which means flat in Bhre Lasem. The story of Nagarawardhani and her husband, Bhre Wirabuhmi, is told in the book Nagarakretagama, and in Pararaton.

The Prince of Wirabhumi had a son Prince of Pakembangan, died on the hunt; had a daughter Princess of Mataram, married to Bhra Hyang Wisesa; had a daughter Princes of Lasem, married to Prince of Tumapel; had a daughter Princess of Matahun.

— Pararaton

After Hayam Wuruk died, the struggle for the throne continued between Wikramawardhana and Nagarawardhani's husband, Bhre Wirabhumi in the Regreg war. The war concluded when Wikramawardhana became King of Majapahit and reunited the Majapahit kingdom.
