= Battle of Daha =

1293 battle in Java

- Part of the Mongol invasion of Java
Date	26 April 1293
Location	Daha (Kediri), East Java, Indonesia
Result	Yuan–Majapahit victory

Belligerents
Yuan dynasty Majapahit	Kediri Kingdom

Commanders and leaders
Raden Wijaya	Jayakatwang; Kebo Mundarang

Strength
Unknown	Unknown

Casualties and losses
Unknown	5,000 killed Many drowned while fleeing

The Battle of Daha took place on 26 April 1293 in Daha (modern Kediri), during the Mongol invasion of Java. Allied forces of the Yuan dynasty and Raden Wijaya, founder of the Majapahit Empire, defeated the army of Jayakatwang, ruler of the Kediri Kingdom. After an 8-hour battle, Jayakatwang's troops were routed, with 5,000 killed and many others drowning while fleeing. Jayakatwang surrendered and was captured, ending his rule, though Raden Wijaya would later turn against his Mongol allies.

== Background ==
When the Yuan army arrived in Java, Raden Wijaya sent an envoy from Madura and informed them that Kertanagara had been killed in a palace coup and the usurper, Jayakatwang, currently ruled in his place. Wijaya allied himself with the army to fight against Jayakatwang and gave the Mongols a map of the country Kalang (Gelang-gelang, another name for Kediri). According to the History of Yuan, Wijaya attacked Jayakatwang without success when he heard of the arrival of the Yuan navy. Then he requested their aid. In return, Yuan generals demanded his submission to their emperor, and he gave it. Raden Wijaya promised a tribute including two princesses should the army succeed in destroying Kediri.

== Battle ==
The army arrived at Daha on the 26th April. The prince of Kediri defended the city with his troops. The battle lasted from 6:00 am to 14:00 pm. After attacking 3 times, Kediri forces were defeated and fled. At the same time that the Mongol and Kediri forces clashed, Majapahit forces attacked the city from another (Note: From the south according to Kidung Panji Wijayakrama, or east according to Pararaton. Nevertheless Kidung Panji Wijayakrama indicated there is a clash in the east too.) side and quickly defeated the guards. Raden Wijaya went into the palace and freed the princess which has been taken captive by Jayakatwang and her two handmaidens. A few thousand Kediri troops tried to cross the river but drowned while 5,000 were killed in the battle. King Jayakatwang retreated to his fortress only to find out that his palace had been burned. The Yuan army then rounded up Daha and called on the king to surrender. In the afternoon, Jayakatwang declared his submission to the Mongols. The Yuan army captured Jayakatwang, his son, his wife and all his officers. Kebo Mundarang, who battled in the south, was defeated and fled, only to be captured by Sora. He was brought to a plain and executed. (Note: According to Pararaton, Kebo Mundarang battled in the east. He was pursued by Rangga Lawe to a place called Trinipanti valley and killed.)

== Aftermath ==
Once Jayakatwang had been captured by Yuan forces, Raden Wijaya returned to Majapahit, ostensibly to prepare his tribute settlement, and leaving his allies to celebrate their victory. Shi Bi and Yighmish allowed Raden Wijaya to go back to his country to prepare his tribute and a new letter of submission, but Gao Xing disliked the idea and he warned the other two. Wijaya asked the Yuan forces to come to his country unarmed, as the princesses could not stand the sight of weapons.
