= Regreg War =

Civil war located in Majapahit Empire

Regreg war
Date	1404–1406
Location	Java
Result	Majapahit victory

Belligerents
Majapahit Empire	Blambangan Kingdom Ming dynasty: Ming envoys

Commanders and leaders
Wikramawardhana; Bhre Tumapel; Raden Gajah	Bhre Wirabhumi †

Casualties and losses
Light	Heavy 170 Ming envoys killed

The Regreg War (often erroneously called the Paregreg) was a civil war that took place in 1404–1406 within the Javanese empire of Majapahit. The conflict was fought as a war of independence between the Kedhaton Kulon (Western court) led by Wikramawardhana against the breakaway Kedhaton Wetan (Eastern court) of Blambangan led by Bhre Wirabhumi. This war of rivalry and secession had caused calamity, crisis, court's preoccupation, the drain of financial resources, and exhaustion, which is thought to be one of the causes of Majapahit's decline in the following years.

== Terminology ==
This conflict is usually referred to as the Paregreg, but that term is based on a linguistic misunderstanding. In the Pararaton chronicle, in which the term for this war is found, events are labelled by adding the prefix pa- to one or more keywords. For example, the Javanese attack on Malayu in Sumatra in 1275 is called pamalayu, the rebellion of Rangga Lawe in 1295 is referred to as paranggalawe, and the massacre of the Sundanese at Bubat in 1357 is called pasuṇḍabubat. Hence the better translation of parĕgrĕg is "the Regreg incident". The word rĕgrĕg means slowly, with halts and jerks, but it can be a mutation of the word ragrag (falling off one by one).

== Division of West and East courts ==
The Majapahit kingdom was established in 1293 by Raden Wijaya with the help of the cunning and able Aria Wiraraja, the Regent of Madura. As a reward for Wiraraja's help, in 1295, Raden Wijaya agreed to give him the eastern portions of East Java, which includes Blambangan areas with Lumajang as its capital. Throughout Raden Wijaya's reign, Arya Wiraraja ruled the eastern realm peacefully as Majapahit's vassal, yet enjoyed substantial freedom. In 1316, Jayanagara, son and heir of Raden Wijaya, cracked down on the Nambi rebellion in Lumajang. Nambi was the successor of Arya Wiraraja. After that battle, the western and eastern realms of East Java were reunited.

According to Pararaton, in 1376 appeared "a new mountain", which hinted at the emergence of a new keraton (court, palace, or center of power) opposed to the central authority of Majapahit. According to Ming Chinese chronicles, in 1377 there were two independent kingdoms in Java, both of which sent their envoys to the Ming court. The Western Kingdom was led by Wu-lao-po-wu, and the Eastern Kingdom was led by Wu-lao-wang-chieh.

Wu-lao-po-wu is the Chinese pronunciation of Bhra Prabu, which refers to Hayam Wuruk (according to Pararaton), while Wu-lao-wang-chieh refers to Bhre Wengker, alias Wijayarajasa, the husband of Rajadewi (Hayam Wuruk's aunt). It seems that Wijayarajasa had the ambition to be the Majapahit monarch. After the death of Gajah Mada, Tribhuwana Wijayatunggadewi, and Rajadewi, he built a new eastern court in Pamotan, thus in Pararaton, he was also mentioned as Bhatara Parameswara ring Pamotan.

== Bhre Wirabhumi and Wikramawardhana's rivalry ==
The Regreg war was incited by Bhre Wirabhumi. The real name of Bhre Wirabhumi is unknown. His name simply means Bhre (Duke) of Wirabhumi, a province of Majapahit that corresponds with the Blambangan area in the "eastern hook" of Java. According to Pararaton, he is the son of Hayam Wuruk with a concubine and adopted as a foster son by Bhre Daha (Rajadewi), the wife of Wijayarajasa. Later Bhre Wirabhumi would be married to Bhre Lasem sang Alemu, the daughter of Bhre Pajang (Hayam Wuruk's sister).

According to Nagarakretagama, the wife of Bhre Wirabhumi is Nagarawardhani, the daughter of Bhre Lasem also known as Indudewi. Indudewi is the daughter of Rajadewi and Wijayarajasa. The Nagarakretagama is more valid than Pararaton since it was written during Bhre Wirabhumi's lifetime. During the reign of Hayam Wuruk and Wijayarajasa, the relations between the western court of Majapahit and the eastern court are described as somewhat an uneasy coexistence and mutual respect, since Wijayarajasa was Hayam Wuruk's father-in-law.

After the death of Hayam Wuruk in 1389, he was succeeded by his nephew and also son-in-law, Wikramawardhana. In the eastern court, after the death of Wijayarajasa in 1398, he was succeeded by his foster son that also his granddaughter's husband, Bhre Wirabhumi. Wirabhumi would rule the Blambangan kingdom with Lumajang as his capital. After the death of Indudewi, the position of Bhre Lasem was awarded to her daughter, Nagarawardhani. However, Wikramawardhana also bestowed the title of Bhre lasem to his wife, the queen Kusumawardhani. That is why in Pararaton there are two Bhre Lasem, Bhre Lasem Sang Halemu (The Fat Bhre Lasem) Bhre Wirabhumi's wife, and Bhre Lasem Sang Ahayu (The Beautiful Bhre Lasem) Wikramawardhana's wife. The contest for the Bhre Lasem title has created an animosity between eastern and western courts, until 1400 when both Nagarawardhani and Kusumawardhani died. Wikramawardhana immediately appointed his daughter-in-law as the new Bhre Lasem, the wife of Bhre Tumapel.

== Regreg war ==
After the appointment of the new Bhre Lasem, a dispute erupted between the two palaces. According to Pararaton, in 1402 Bhre Wirabhumi and Wikramawardhana were involved in a bitter quarrel, and afterward, they shunned each other and refused to talk. In 1403, through a dangerous gamble of power, Wirabhumi sought military assistance from the Chinese court against the Majapahit court. The Chinese Imperial court responded by recognizing his province's independence from Majapahit, in exchange Bhre Wirabhumi accepted a seal, commission, and other insignia of Chinese suzerainty over his land. This action would lead to a larger Regreg war in 1404. In Old Javanese, the word regreg means "to proceed with halts and jerks, to proceed slowly" (Zoetmulder 1982, s.v. "rĕgrĕg"). It indicates that there were many battles fought between eastern and western Majapahit throughout the two years, sometimes a battle was won by the western court, won by the eastern court.

Finally, in 1406 the Western troops led by Bhre Tumapel, son of Wikramawardhana, penetrated the eastern palace. Bhre Wirabhumi was defeated and fled using a boat during the night. He was chased down and killed by Raden Gajah, also known as Bhra Narapati, titled Ratu Angabhaya of the Western court. Raden Gajah brought the head of Bhre Wirabhumi to the western court (Trowulan). Later Bhre Wirabhumi would be sanctified in Girisa Pura temple located in the Lung area.

== Aftermath ==
After the defeat of Bhre Wirabhumi, the eastern court was finally reunited with the western court. However, the ongoing conflicts all these years have kept Majapahit preoccupied and has loosened Majapahit's grip on their overseas vassals. As one by one Majapahit's overseas possessions outside of Java have liberated themselves and refuse to pay tribute to the central court, Majapahit could do nothing to assert their rules. In 1405, West Borneo was held under Chinese influence. Followed by the rebellions in Palembang, Malayu, and Malacca that would grow into thriving ports independent from Majapahit. On the northern coast of Borneo, the Brunei Kingdom has also liberated itself from Javanese overlordship.

Moreover, Wikramawardhana also owed a huge debt of gold to the Chinese Ming court, blood money as compensation for the death of Chinese envoys. During the Regreg War, some Chinese envoys were sent by Chinese Admiral Zheng He to visit the eastern court, however, they were caught in the middle of the battle. Around 170 Chinese envoys were killed during this battle as collateral victims, which caused the uproar of the Chinese Ming Emperor. For this incident, Wikramawardhana was fined 60,000 tahil of gold by Ming's court. Until 1408 Wikramawardaha could only be paid 10,000 tahil. In the end, the emperor Yong Le pardoned the fine out of pity for the Javanese king. This event was recorded in the Yingya Shenglan by Ma Huan who was Zheng He's secretary.

After the Regreg War, Wikramawardhana brought Bhre Daha, the daughter of Bhre Wirabhumi as a concubine. From that marriage was born Suhita who would ascend to the throne as queen regnant in 1427 to succeed Wikramawardhana. During the reign of Suhita, the killer of Bhre Wirabhumi, Raden Gajah, was punished by death sentence in 1433.

== In Javanese literature ==
The Regreg war is remembered in the collective memory of Javanese tradition. After the advent of Islamic polities in Java, the theme of Regreg war appeared in Javanese literature, such as in Serat Kanda, Serat Damarwulan, and Serat Blambangan.

According to the tales in Serat Kanda, there was a war between Queen Kencanawungu, the ruler of Majapahit in the west against Menak Jingga the ruler of Blambangan in the east. Menak Jingga finally was killed by Damarwulan, a knight sent by Queen Kencanawungu. As a reward, Damarwulan would be wed to Queen Kencanawungu and become the king of Majapahit, stylized as Prabu Mertawijaya. From their union would born King Brawijaya the last king of Majapahit.

== See also ==
- Nagarakretagama
- Pararaton
- Battle of Bubat
- Blambangan

== Bibliography ==
- Ricklefs, Merle Calvin (1991). Sejarah Indonesia Modern. Yogyakarta: Gadjah Mada University Press. ISBN 9794201871. OCLC 38320467.
- Muljana, Slamet (2005). Runtuhnya Kerajaan Hindu-Jawa dan Timbulnya Negara-Negara Islam di Nusantara. Yogyakarta: LKiS Yogyakarta. ISBN 9798451163. OCLC 61447145.
- Muljana, Slamet (2006). Tafsir Sejarah Nagara Kretagama. Yogyakarta: LKiS. ISBN 9792552545. OCLC 191089695.
