= Kertawijaya =

Dyah Kertawijaya
- Maharaja of Majapahit; Bhre Tumapel

7th Maharaja of Majapahit
- Reign: 1447 – 1451
- Predecessor: Suhita
- Successor: Rajasawardhana

3rd Prince of Tumapel
- Reign: 1427 – 1447
- Predecessor: elder brother of Kertawijaya
- Successor: Singhawikramawardhana
- Born: Dyah Kertawijaya
- Died: 1451
- Spouse: Jayawardhanī Dyah Jayéswari, Princess of Daha
- Issue: Rajasawardhana; Girisawardhana; Singhawikramawardhana
Regnal name
- Çri Bhattara Prabhu Wijayāparakramawarddhāna
- House: Rajasa
- Father: Wikramawardhana
- Mother: Kusumawardhani

Kertawijaya or Dyah Kertawijaya was the seventh monarch of Majapahit reigning from 1447 to 1451 by the regnal name Sri Maharaja Wijayaparakramawardhana.

== Reign ==
Prince Kertawijaya succeeded his older sister Suhita in 1447 due to royal prerogative.

Pāduka srī mahārāja, srī sakala-yawa-rājādhirāja paraméswara srī bhattāra prabhu Wijayaparākramawarddhānanāmarājābhiseka garbbaprasutināma Dyah Krtawijaya
His Majesty the Maharaja, the King of kings of the whole Java and Supreme Lord, the august Sovereign whose regnal name was Wijayaparakramawardhana and his birth name was Dyah Kertawijaya

— Waringin Pitu charter (1447)

Natural disasters frequently occurred during his reign, including earthquakes and volcanic eruptions. One famous incident was Tidung Gelanting's killing, led by his nephew Prince of Paguhan, son of the Prince of Tumapel.

When the Majapahit Kingdom was in chaos due to civil war, moral decline, and rampant gambling, robbery, and rape, Dyah Kertawijaya invited the Sufi saint Sunan Ampel to help improve the behavior of the people. He then introduced the Moh Limo teachings.

== Identification between Kertawijaya and Brawijaya ==
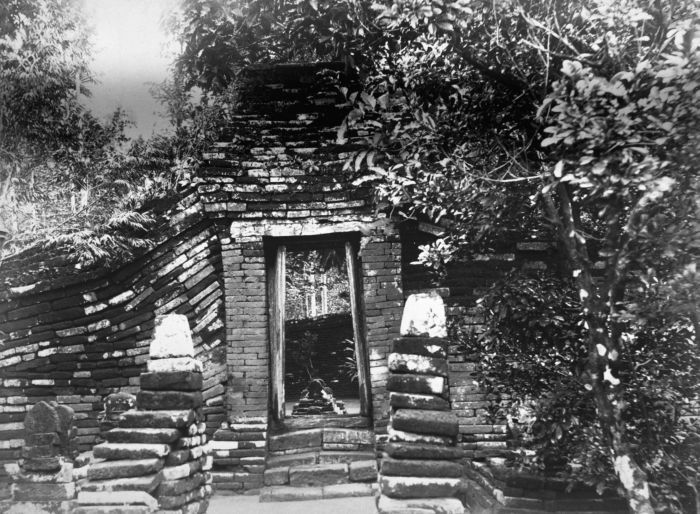
The tomb of Princess of Champa in Trowulan (captured around 1870–1900)

Brawijaya is the name or title of a well-known Majapahit king for modern Javanese people under some manuscripts written in the next era.

A tomb of a princess of Champa found in Mojokerto with the year of 1448 led the Javanese to believe that she was one of King Brawijaya's principal wives. In addition, the name of Kertawijaya as the ancestor of Raden Patah was found in Queen Kalinyamat's tomb located in Jepara.

Another story told that King Brawijaya's wife was a Muslim's queen Dwarawati of the Champa Kingdom. In contrast, Pararaton mentioned that Dyah Kertawijaya's wife was the Princess of Daha, referred to Jayawardhani (personal name Dyah Jayeswari) in the Waringin Pitu charter (1447), a daughter of his aunt Rajasawardhani, by whom he had married when he was still the Prince of Tumapel. This was proven by the Pararaton passage mentions the children of King Wikramawardhana, followed by the children of the Prince of Pandan Salas (husband of Rajasawardhani).

putra pamungsu jalu Bhre Tumapel, sri Kertawijaya
his youngest son, Prince of Tumapel, Kertawijaya.

— Pararaton

Bhre Daha, kambil denira Bhre Tumapel, sama pamungsu
the Princess of Daha, married by the Prince of Tumapel, both of them being youngest children.

— Pararaton

In accordance with Sam Poo Kong's chronicle, the Chinese lady buried in Mojokerto was a daughter of Haji Bok Tak Keng as well the wife of Chinese ambassador for Java, Ma Hong Fu. It was impossible for her to be considered the king's wife.

The other person who was considered as King Brawijaya was Dyah Ranawijaya, referred to as King Girindrawardhana, a son of Dyah Suraprabhawa (regnal name Singhawikramawardhana). His name had been mentioned in the closing part of Pararaton. Thus, "Brawijaya I" referred to Dyah Kertawijaya while "Brawijaya VI" referred to Dyah Ranawijaya.

== Death ==
King Wijayaparakramawardhana Dyah Kertawijaya died in 1451. The king was enshrined at Kertawijayapura. Later, he was succeeded by Rajasawardhana, Prince of Kahuripan.

There wasn't explicit mention of the family relationship between the late king and the new king in Pararaton, raising the speculation that Rajasawardhana ascended the throne by killing Dyah Kertawijaya. Another opinion assured that King Rajasawardhana (r. 1451 – 1453) was a biological son of King Wijayaparakramawardhana, whose personal name, as mentioned in the Waringin Pitu charter, was Dyah Wijayakumara. Moreover, he was the former Prince of Kahuripan, just as Queen Suhita was. The title Bhre Kahuripan was a prestigious rank in the Majapahit court, typically conferred upon the second most powerful person after the monarch, often to the heir apparent, queen dowager, or royal consort. The next ascension must be the late king's younger offspring, Dyah Suryawikrama, Prince of Wengker, the future King Girishawardhana or Bhra Hyang Purwawisesa by designation (r. 1456 – 1466), and Dyah Suraprabhawa, Prince of Tumapel (Singhawikramawardhana, r. 1466 – 1478).

== Ancestry ==
Singhawardhana; 1st Prince of Paguhan
Wikramawardhana; Bhra Hyang Wisesa; 5th King of Majapahit
Kertawardhana; 1st Prince of Tumapel
Rajasaduhiteswari; 1st Princess of Pajang
Tribhuwanotunggadewi; 3rd Queen of Majapahit
Dyah Kertawijaya; Wijayaparakramawardhana; 7th King of Majapahit
Kertawardhana; 1st Prince of Tumapel
Rajasanagara; 4th King of Majapahit
Tribhuwanotunggadewi; 3rd Queen of Majapahit
Kusumawardhani; 1st Princess of Kabalan; 3rd Princess of Lasem
Wijayarajasa; Bhra Parameswara of Pamotan; 1st Prince of Wengker
Paduka Sori

== Footnote ==
Preceded by Suhita	Great King of the Majapahit Kingdom; 1447 - 1451	Succeeded by Rajasawardhana
