= Vikramavardhana =

Vikramavardhana ꦮꦶꦑꦿꦩꦮꦂꦝꦟ
- Bhre Mataram ꦨ꧀ꦲꦿꦺꦩꦡꦬꦩ꧀

5th Maharaja of Majapahit
- Reign: 1389 – 1429
- Predecessor: Hayam Wuruk
- Successor: Suhita

1st Prince of Mataram
- Reign: c. 1353 – 1372/75

3rd Prince of Kahuripan
- Reign: c. 1372/75 – 1389
- Predecessor: Tribhuwana Wijayatunggadewi
- Successor: Rajasawardhani
- Born: before 1365
- Died: 1429
- Burial: Paramawisesapura, Lalangon
- Spouse: Kusumawardhani, 3rd Princess of Lasem
- Issue: Hyang Wekas ing Suka; 2nd Prince of Tumapel; Queen regnant Suhita; King Wijayaparakramawardhana
Regnal name
- Bhra Hyang Wisesa ꦨ꧀ꦲꦿꦲꦾꦁꦮꦶꦱꦺꦱ
- House: Rajasa
- Father: Singhawardhana Raden Sumana, 1st Prince of Paguhan
- Mother: Rajasaduhiteswari Dyah Nertaja, 1st Princess of Pajang

Vikramavardhana (Javanese: ꦮꦶꦑꦿꦩꦮꦂꦝꦟ, romanized: Wikramawardhana), often known by his regnal name Bhra Hyang Wisesa was a Javanese emperor and succeeded Hayam Wuruk as the fifth monarch of the Majapahit, reigning from 1389 to 1429.

== Early life ==
His ksatria name was Raden Gagak Sali as stated in Pararaton. He was the nephew and also the son-in-law of the previous monarch, King Rajasanagara Dyah Hayam Wuruk. His mother was the king's younger sister, Rajasaduhiteswari or Wardhanaduhiteswari or Iswari in short. Krom interpreted it as "the illustrious Wardhana's daughter, Iswari". The term "Wardhana" referred to Prince consort Kertawardhana, husband of Queen Tribhuwana. She was given the title Bhre Pajang and married to Singhawardhana, Bhre Paguhan. According to Pararaton, Vikramavardhana had two younger sisters. The older one was Nagarawardhani, she would be the wife of Vikramavardhana's rival in the future. She was originally the Bhre Wirabhumi before the title shifted to her husband and she became Bhre Lasem. The younger was Surawardhani or Rajasawardhani. At first, she was either the Bhre Panawuhan or Bhre Panawan-awan then after a few rotations, her title was Bhre Kahuripan. Vikramavardhana himself was the Bhre Mataram. In contrast, Nagarakretagama only stated Rajasawardhani as a daughter of Iswari. Perhaps, Nagarawardhani was adopted by The Princess of Daha since her marriage was mentioned as childless in Pararaton.

The young prince was arranged to marry his cousin, Kusumawardhani, styled as Princess of Kabalan. He was no older than 12 and she was no older than 7 at that time. Nagarakretagama written in 1365 reported that they were already married besides King Rajasanagara was just 31 years old. The princess was the only child of the king by his primary wife, Paduka Sori or Sudewi. Vikramavardhana was appointed as heir apparent for his marriage to Kusumawardhani.

== Reign ==
A succession conflict arose following the death of Vikramavardhana grandmother, Queen Regnant Tribhuwana (who held the title Princess of Kahuripan once again after her abdication), and her sister Rajadewi in the 1370s. Rajadewi's husband, Wijayarajasa carried out a separatist action by proclaiming himself as a new king with the regnal name Bhatara Parameswara ring Pamotan. King Rajasanagara (also known as Dyah Hayam Wuruk) was mentioned as ruled in Kedhaton Kulon means "the Western Court" while Prince Wijayarajasa was the head of Kedhaton Wetan or "the Eastern Court". Wijayarajasa's action started the Kedhaton Kulon and Kedhaton Wetan period. Hayam Wuruk refused to fight him as his only son from a concubine supported Wijayarajasa, perhaps because he felt more worthy of inheriting the throne than Vikramavardhana. However, Hayam Wuruk gained the loyalty of most of the Majapahit's royal family members.

As heir-apparent, Vikramavardhana was the most likely to inherit the high prince title Bhre Kahuripan from his grandmother although it wasn't mentioned clearly in Pararaton. Another rotation resulted in the title Bhre Wirabhumi was gotten by Hayam Wuruk's son from a concubine inherited from his wife who was also Vikramavardhana's younger sister, Nagarawardhani.

After the death of Wijayarajasa in 1388 and Hayam Wuruk in 1389, the conflict became worse. In the Western court, Vikramavardhana ascended the throne over the legitimacy of Kusumawardhani as she was the only child of the late monarch born from the queen consort. On the other side, Bhre Wirabhumi succeeded Wijayarajasa.

King Vikramavardhana's co-reigned with Queen Kusumawardhani was challenged by Bhre Wirabhumi. Bhre Wirabhumi felt that he had a better right to be a successor since he was the only son of the late monarch despite his biological mother being a lesser wife or concubine. He was also mentioned as Po-ling-ta-ha or Putreng Daha (Putra-ing Daha) due to his adoption by Bhre Daha which didn't refer to either Hayam Wuruk's cousin, Indudewi, or his aunt, Rajadewi.

Deliberately not to recognize his sovereignty, Vikramavardhana bestowed the title of Bhre Lasem to Kusumawardhani even though at that time the title had been being held by his sister. According to Pararaton, there were two Princesses of Lasem during the Kedhaton Kulon and Kedhaton Wetan periods, and both of them were the new ruler's primary wives. Kusumawardhani, Bhre Lasem Sang Ahayu or "the Fair Princess of Lasem" of western court and Nagarawardhani, Bhre Lasem Sang Alemu or "the Fat Princess of Lasem" of eastern court.

In 1398, Majapahit under the rule of King Vikramavardhana sent their navy to invade the Kingdom of Singapura. Their last ruler, King Iskandar Shah fled to the north. The invasion was greatly successful. Singapore eventually got sacked and destroyed by the Majapahit

Tahun çaka netra-paksagni-sitangsu (1322 saka year or 1400), Vikramavardhana abdicated to become a religious. In the same year, it was reported about the death of Bhre Lasem in Kawidyadharen without any additional information about who was she, which left the historian confused as there were already three women who became the Princess of Lasem. The first holder was Indudewi, who had been shifted to Bhre Daha at that time as well as the late Bhre Lasem. The second was Nagarawardhani, followed by Kusumawardhani on the third. Nagarawardhani had the smallest possibility as the next sentences of Pararaton would mention the death of Bhre Lasem the Fat. If the one who had died was Queen Kusumawardhani, then it would have been probably the reason why Vikramavardhana returned to the court and had a feud again with Bhre Wirabhumi in 1401.

Both rulers had good relationships with the Chinese, moreover, they received envoys separately. Admiral Cheng Ho of the Ming Dynasty was recorded as visiting Java in 1405. The outbreak of the Regreg War in 1406 accidentally killed Chinese envoys in Kedhaton Wetan. Despite Vikramavardhana's success in winning the war and defeating Bhre Wirabhumi, the civil war gravely weakened previously unchallenged Majapahit hegemony in Nusantara and loosened Majapahit's grip on its far-flung vassal kingdoms.

Hyang Wisesa or Bhra Hyang Wisesa was Vikramavardhana's regular designation in Pararaton. Bhra was a shortened form of Bhatara. His pronouncement to adopt the name Hyang Wisesa or Yang-wei-hsi-sha was told in Ming's record in 1415. Vikramavardhana ruled until 1429 and was succeeded by a prabhu stri (queen regnant) who is still debated by historians who was her. The two most likely to assume were his wife, Kusumawardhani, if she was still alive, or their daughter, Suhita.

== Personal life ==
His primary wife and the only queen consort was Kusumawardhani, 1st Princess of Kabalan, then styled as 3rd Princess of Lasem, as well as the only daughter of King Rajasanagara Dyah Hayam Wuruk and Queen Sudewī. She was undoubtedly a drop-dead beauty. It wasn't recorded when the queen gave birth to the crown prince. He inherited either the title Prince of Mataram from his father or Prince of Kabalan from his mother before died in 1399. Vikramavardhana gave him the posthumous name Hyang Wekasing Sukha. Kusumawardhani died a year later.

Vikramavardhana's second child was Bhre Tumapel strongly possibly the crown prince from 1399 until he died in 1427. He married two Princesses of Lasem, and both of them were his cousins. His first wife, the 4th Bhre Lasem was a daughter of Surawardhani and Ranamanggala. His second wife, the 5th Bhre Lasem was a daughter of Bhre Wirabhumi and Nagarawardhani.

Vikramavardhana's third child and the only recorded daughter was the future Queen regnant Suhita. She was arranged to marry Ratnapangkaja, a son of Surawardhani and Ranamanggala. Ratnapangkaja's paternal grandfather was Dyah Sotor, Queen regnant Tribhuwana's stepson.

His fourth and last child namely Dyah Kertawijaya. He was styled as Bhre Tumapel after the death of his older brother. Dyah Kertawijaya also married his cousin, Dyah Jayeswari (formally Jayawardhani). She was the youngest child, in the same condition as her husband. Jayawardhani was the younger sister of the 4th Bhre Lasem and Ratnapangkaja. Later, the youngest prince would ascend the throne after Suhita under his regnal name Wijayaparakramawardhana.

He was the only one who was mentioned as born from Kusumawardhani in Pararaton. The mother of his three siblings was never mentioned in any sources, thus making it confusing. Historian J. Noorduyn argued that the four above were born from Queen Kusumawardhani seeing that the name of the four siblings written without using the additional terms rabi haji, rabi anom, or rabi ksatriya which was usually used to refer to a royal name born from a secondary wife or concubine in Pararaton.

One of Vikramavardhana's concubines was the Princess of Mataram. Her parents were his former rivals, Prince of Wirabhumi and Nagarawardhani. She was taken away after the Regreg war and possibly childless.

== In Literature ==
Deśavarṇana (Also known as Nagarakretagama)

"Tekwan / wrddyawke narendra san umungwin wirabhumy andiri, san çri nagarawarddani pratita rajñi kanyakanopama, ndan / ranten/ haji raja ratwiɳ mataram / lwir hyaɳ kumaranurun, san çri wikramawarddaneçwara paninkah çri narendradipa."

"There was also the younger sibling of the king, the ruler of Wirabhumi, standing apart there: the illustrious princess Nagarawarddhani, renowned as a queen incomparable among maidens. And the royal pair of Mataram were like divine children descended from heaven: the illustrious lord Wikramawardhana, who acted as the radiant lamp of kings."

— Pupuh 6

"Tekwan / wriddi siran / pakanak i siran nrpati kusumawarddaniçwari, raji rajakumaryy anindya siniwi pura ri kabalan utamen raras, saɳ çri wikramawarddanendra saniruktyanira panucapiɳ sanagara, saksat / dewata dewati siran atmwa hlam anukani twasin jagat."

"And there was also her younger brother, the spouse of the sovereign queen Kusumawarddhani — a royal prince of flawless excellence, cherished above all within the palace for the refinement of his beauty: the illustrious lord Wikramawardhana. His fame was spoken of throughout the land; he and his consort were like a god and goddess incarnate, whose very nature was to show compassion to the hearts of the world."

— Pupuh 7

Pararaton

"Bhre Pajang apuputra titiga, mijil bhra Hyang wiçesa, kaksatriyanira raden Gagak sali, karatunira aji Wikrama, sira sang angambil bhre Lasem sira sang ahayu, aputra mijil bhre Hyang wekasing suka; putra manih stri bhre Lasem sang alemu kalap denira bhre Wirabhumi; putra manih stri bhre Kahuripan."

"Bhre Pajang had three children. First was Bhre Hyang Wisesa, whose knightly name was Raden Gagak Sali; his regnal title was Aji Wikrama. He took as wife the beautiful Bhre Lasem, and from them was born Bhre Hyang Wekasing Suka. Another child was a daughter, Bhre Lasem, who was desired in marriage by Bhre Wirabhumi. Another child again was a daughter, Bhre Kahuripan"

Bhra Hyang wiçesapuputra mijil bhre Tumapel; putrestri mijil bhre prabhu stri, bhiseka dewi Suhita; manih putra pamungsu jalu bhre Tumapel çri Kertawijaya.

"Bhre Hyang Wisesa had children: a son, Bhre Tumapel; a daughter, the princess who became ruler, consecrated as Suhita; and another child, the youngest son, Bhre Tumapel, Kertawijaya."

"Bhra Hyang wiçesa prabhu. Tumuli guntur Prang bakat i çaka mukaning-wong-kaya-naga, 1317."

"Bhre Hyang Wisesa became king. Then there thundered the Paregreg civil war at Bubat(?) / Bakat(?) in the Śaka year ‘faces-men-riches-serpent’, 1317."

"Bhra Hyang wiçesa sira bhagawan i çaka netra-paksagni-sitangsu, 1322."

"Bhre Hyang Wisesa became a bhagawan in the Śaka year ‘eye–wing–fire–moon’, 1322 (1400 CE)."

"Bhra Hyang wiçesa apupurikan lawan bhra Wirabhumi. Dadi denira dampul, abelah mati siradampul i çaka 1323. Helet tigang tahun tumuli dadi manih kang paregreg. Sama apangarah, bhre Tumapel, bhra Hyang Parameçwara, sami ingaturan. “Sapa kang sun-ilonana”. Dadi kang yuddha, kalah kadaton kulon, kapesan bhra Hyang wiçesa. Runtik sira ayun lungaha. Ingaturan bhre Tumapel, bhra Parameçwara: “Sampun age lungha, isun-lawanane”. Suka bhra Hyang wiçesa, apangarah ingadegan denira bhre Tumapel, denira bhre Parameçwara. Kalah kadaton wetan. Bhre Daha ingemban denira bhra Hyang wiçesa, bhinakta mangilen."

"Bhre Hyang Wisesa entered into conflict with Bhre Wirabhumi. They came to blows; there was division, and men died in the division, in the Śaka year 1323. After three years there then arose again the Paregreg war. Both sides prepared themselves. Bhre Tumapel and Bhra Hyang Parameśwara were both summoned. ‘Whom shall I follow?’ Then battle began. The western palace was defeated; Bhre Hyang Wisesa was hard pressed. In distress he wished to flee. Then Bhre Tumapel and Bhra Parameśwara said: ‘Do not flee yet — let us fight them.’ Bhre Hyang Wisesa rejoiced at the steadfastness shown by Bhre Tumapel and Bhre Parameśwara. The eastern palace was defeated. Bhre Daha was taken under the protection of Bhre Hyang Wisesa and carried westward."

"Bhra Hyang wiçesa mokta dhinarmeng Lalangon, bhisekaning dharma ring Paramawiçesapura."

"Bhre Hyang Wisesa passed away and was deified at Lalangon, his memorial sanctuary being established at Paramawiśesapura."

Preceded by Hayam Wuruk	Monarch of Majapahit Empire; 1389–1429	Succeeded by Suhita
