= Damarwulan =

Literary work

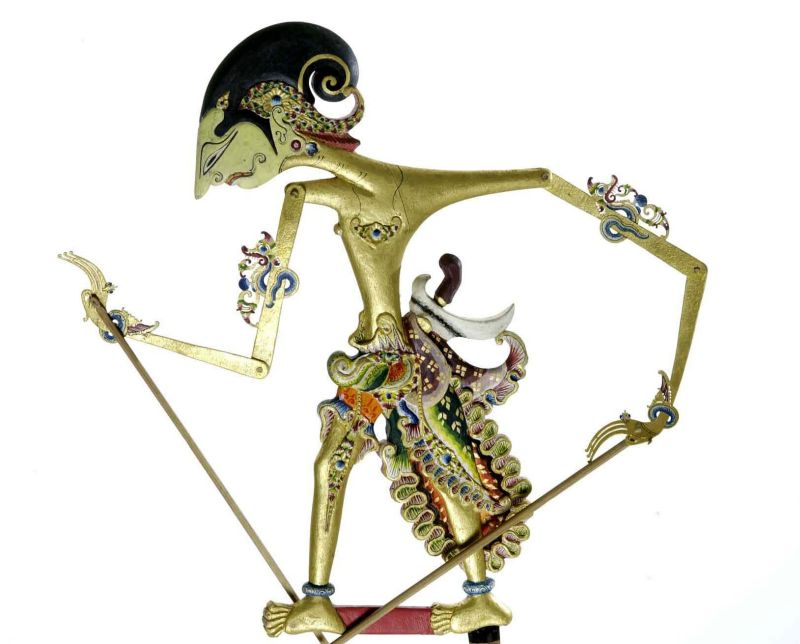
Depiction of the hero Damarwulan in a wayang klitik puppet.

Damarwulan is a Javanese legendary hero who appears in a cycle of stories used in the performance of wayang klitik, as well as Langendriyan (female dance-opera) and ketoprak (popular theater). These stories tell of the struggles between the Majapahit and Blambangan kingdoms, in which Damarwulan gains honor. The stories are especially popular in East Java.

== Origin ==
The Damarwulan legend is associated with the Majapahit court at the time of the queen Suhita, at which time there was a war with Blambangan. However, the names of the characters Damar Wulan ("radiance of the moon") and Menak Jingga ("red knight") suggest that they may incorporate elements of an older sun-moon myth. It is uncertain when the story (MSS.Jav.89) was donated to the Library in 1815. It is thought to date to the late 18th century and "begins with the accession of the daughter of Brawijaya (Kusuma Kancana Wungu) to the throne of Majapahit."

== Characters ==
- Prabu Kenya, also known as Queen Kencanawungu, the maiden queen regent of Majapahit
- Patih Lohgender, her prime minister
- Layang Seta and Layang Kumitir, the prime minister's twin sons
- Dewi Anjasmara, the prime minister's daughter
- Damarwulan, the prime minister's nephew, was raised away from court by his grandfather
- Menak Jingga, the King of Blambangan, a vassal of Majapahit
- Dewi Wahita and Dewi Puyengan, princesses held captive by Menak Jingga as concubines
- Sabdapalon and Nayagenggong, Damarwulan's servants

== Synopsis ==
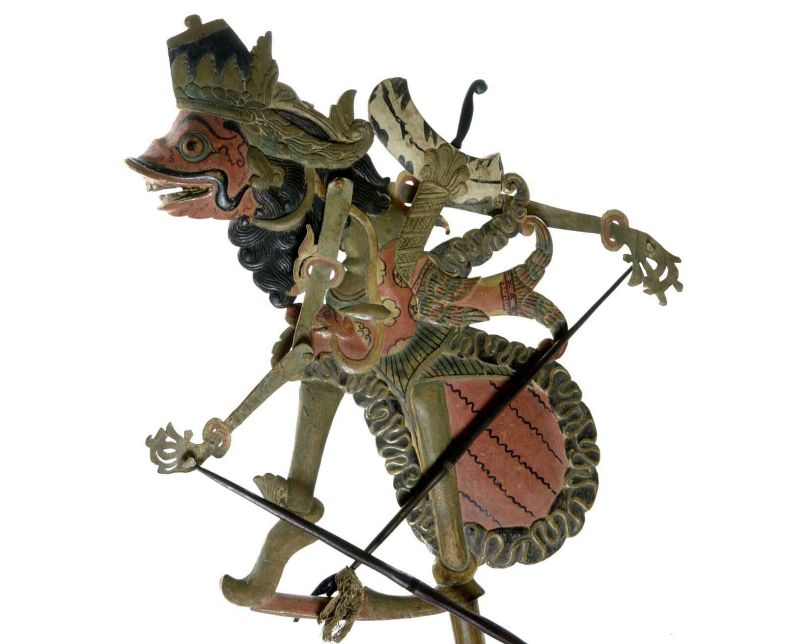
Depiction of the villain Menak Jingga in a wayang klitik puppet.

Damarwulan is a prince by birth, a nephew of the prime minister, Patih Lohgender, but was raised in the hermitage of his grandfather. Following his grandfather's advice, he goes to the Majapahit court seeking worldly experiences and employment. His cousins, the arrogant Layang Seta and Layang Kumitir, the prime minister's sons, mistreat him when he arrives. Patih Lohgender, not wanting him to compete with his sons, assigns him as a grass-cutter and stableboy to attend to Lohgender's horses. Though he is stripped of his fine garments and works as a humble servant in a stable, Damarwulan still looks strikingly handsome. The rumors of a handsome stableboy eventually reach Anjasmara, the prime minister's daughter. She seeks him out secretly, and they fall in love and are clandestinely married. One night, Anjasmara's brothers overhear voices in her chamber. They break in to find Damarwulan in Anjasmara's chamber and try to kill him, but he overcomes them. They flee to their father, who orders that Damarwulan be executed. Anjasmara pleads for her lover, and he doesn't execute Damarwulan but imprisons the pair.

Meanwhile, Menak Jingga, the king of Blambangan has written a letter to Queen Kencanawungu asking for her hand. When the queen rejects him, he declares war on the Majapahit kingdom. He is successful in dispatching Majapahit's allies, and finally, the kingdom is threatened by his forces directly. In distress, the queen announces that whoever kills Menak Jingga and brings her his head can have her hand. Worried when no saviors present themselves, she has a divine revelation that a young knight named Damarwulan can overcome him. She orders Patih Lohgender to release him from jail and send him forth on his mission.

Damarwulan, accompanied by his servants, makes his way to Blambangan. Arriving at night, he sneaks into the gardens and manages to overhear a conversation at the pavilion between two resentful captive princesses, Dewi Wahita and Dewi Puyengan, who are forced to be the concubines of Menak Jingga. Damarwulan enters the pavilion and confides in them; enamoured by his charm and good looks, they fall in love and become devoted to him. At this time, Menak Jingga decides to visit the princesses and discovers Damarwulan. They fight, but Damarwulan cannot hurt Menak Jingga, and severely wounded, appears to die. Menak Jingga leaves, ordering his servants to guard the body. However, when they fall asleep, the two princesses carry him away, nurture him, and explain the secret of Menak Jingga's magic invulnerability, a club of yellow iron kept behind his headrest. If the king is hit on his left temple with this club, he will die. Risking their lives for the sake of their lover, the princesses manage to steal the club while the Menak Jingga is asleep. A second battle between Menak Jingga and Damarwulan follows, in which Damarwulan manages to behead the king. Successful, he returns to Majapahit, but the prime minister's twin sons ambush him outside the palace, killing him and presenting Menak Jingga's head to the queen. However, Damarwulan has not died yet; a hermit rescues and revives Damarwulan. Finally, the queen learns what happened to Damarwulan. In a final battle, Damarwulan defeats his cousins. Damarwulan is crowned as the King of Majapahit and is permitted to retain Anjasmara as his other wife, as well as Dewi Wahita and Dewi Puyengan as his concubines.

== Serat Damar Wulan ==
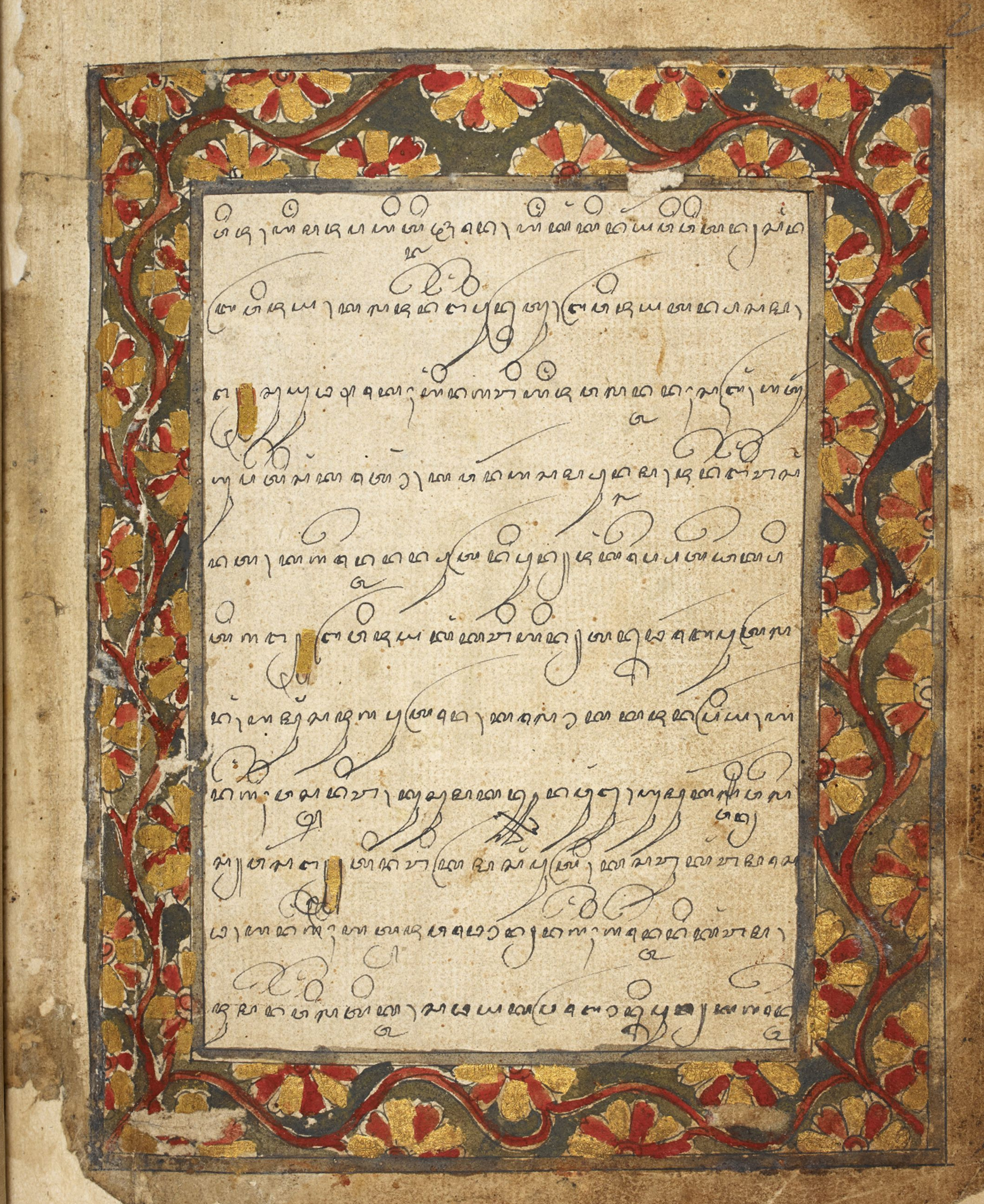
A Wadana or an elaborate carpet page in Serat Damar Wulan, 18th Century, British Library; which tells the accession of Brawijaya's daughter (Kusuma Kancana Wungu) to the throne of Majapahit at the age of 14.

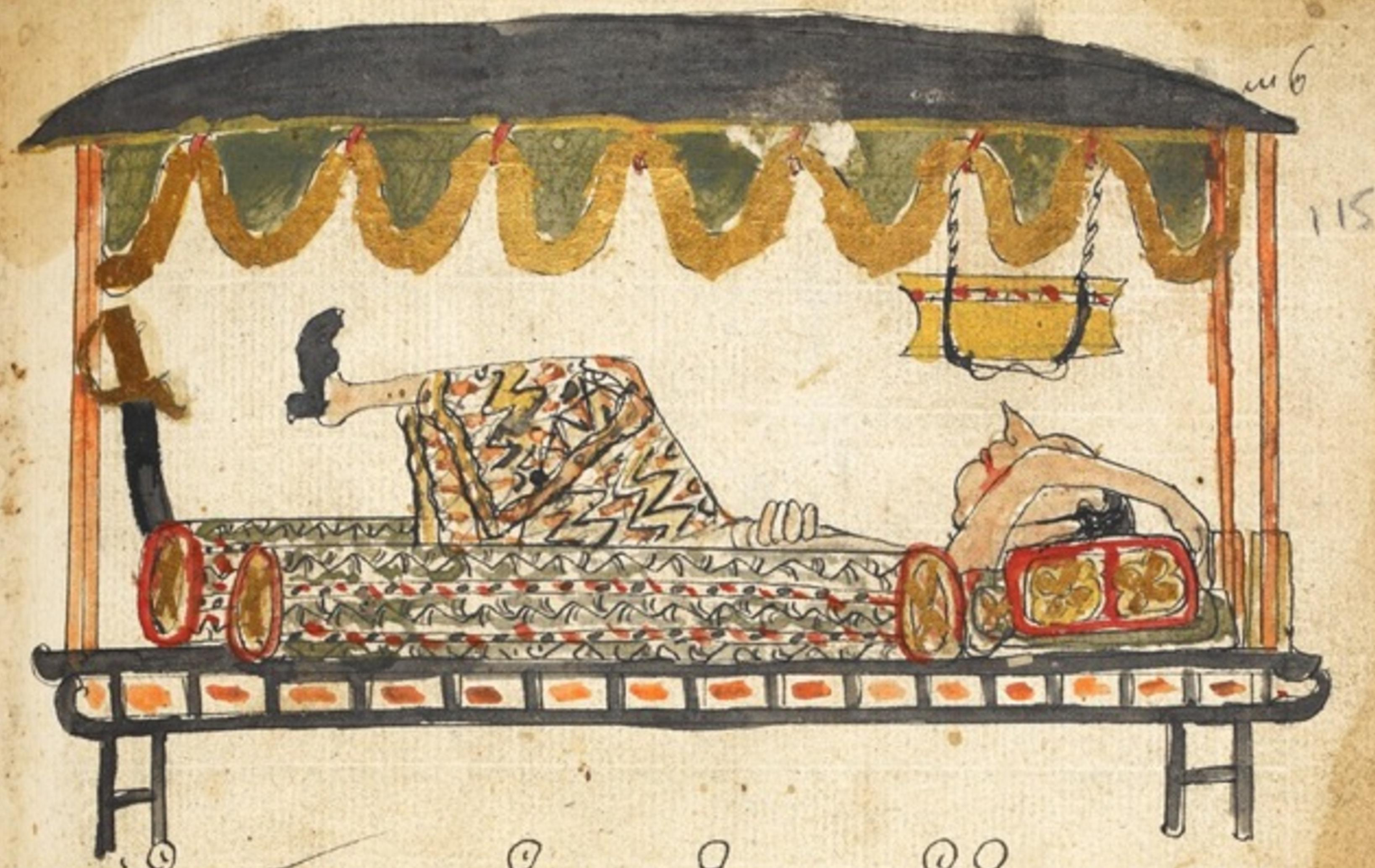
An illumination in Serat Damar Wulan, 18th Century, British Library; depicting a man (Menak Jingga) sleeping with his arm across his eyes, a sandal just balanced on a foot.
