= Suhita =

Queen of the Majapahit Empire, 1429–1447

Suhita ꦯꦸꦲꦶꦡ
- Maharani of Majapahit; Bhre Daha
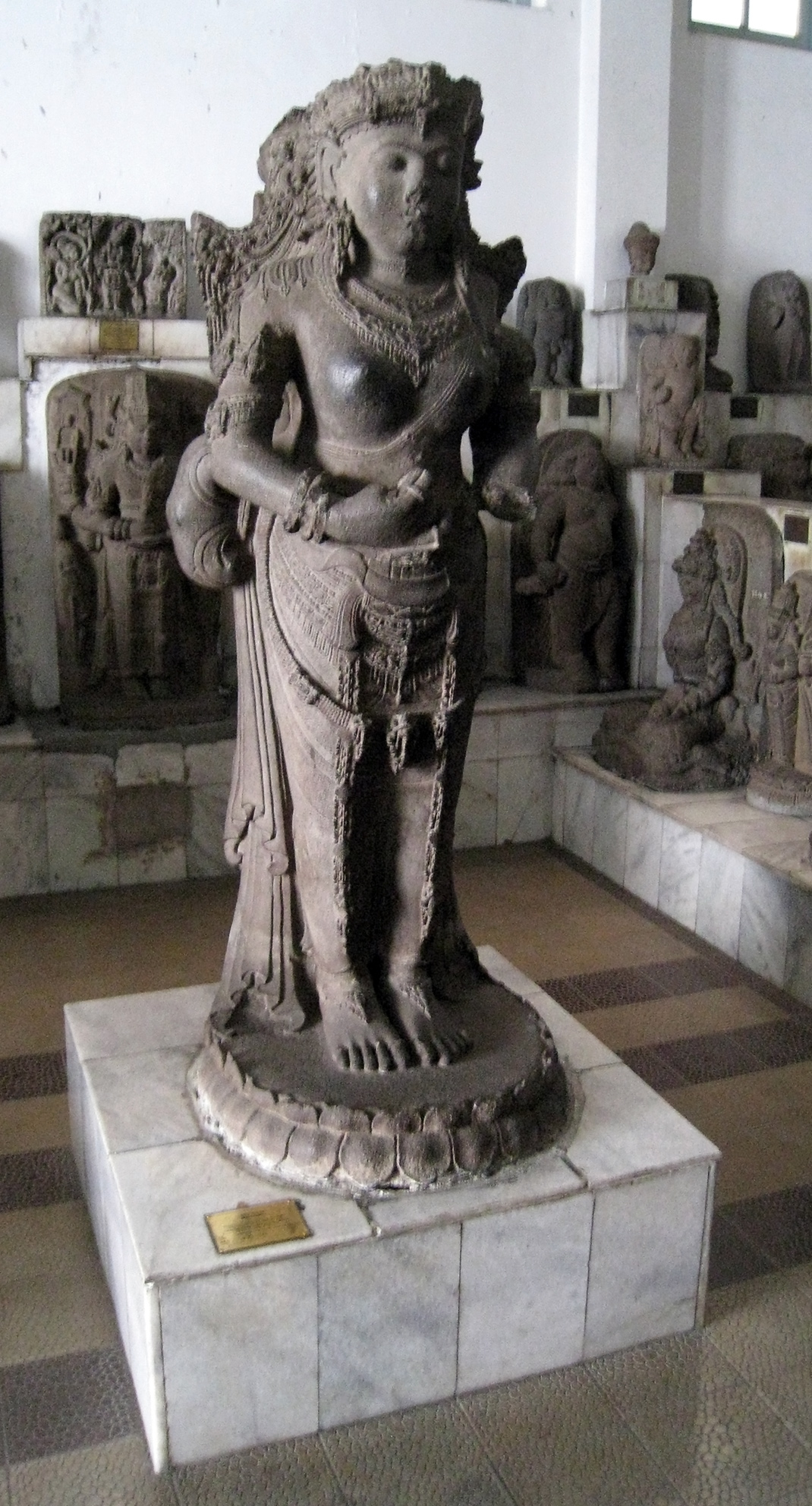
- Statue of Queen Suhita of Majapahit.

6th Maharani of Majapahit
- Reign: 1429 – 1447
- Predecessor: Vikramavardhana
- Successor: Kertawijaya
- Born: before 1406; Majapahit
- Died: 1447; Majapahit
- Burial: Singhajaya
- Spouse: Ratnapangkaja, Prince of Kahuripan (died 1446)
Regnal name
- Bhra Prabhu Stri Dewi Suhita (Pararaton)
- House: Rajasa
- Father: Vikramavardhana
- Mother: Kusumawardhani
- Religion: Hinduism

Suhita or Soheeta (died 1447), was a Javanese queen regnant and the sixth monarch of the Majapahit empire, ruling from 1429 to 1447.

== Early life and succession ==
She was the daughter of King Wikramawardhana (formally Bhra Hyang Wisesa), her predecessor. Her mother was strongly possibly his principal wife, Kusumawardhani seeing that her name was written without prefixes rabi anom, rabi haji, or rabi ksatria usually used to refer a son or daughter of a concubine. If so, her parents as well as the king and the queen were first cousins. She had two older brothers: Hyang Wekas ing Sukha, and 2nd Prince of Tumapel also a younger brother: Dyah Kertawijaya. Both of her older brothers died during the reign of Wikramawardhana.

As he died in 1429, Pararaton reported that the empire was ruled by a queen regnant or prabhu stri. Suhita was the woman suspected. Later, she was succeeded by her younger brother Dyah Kertawijaya by the regnal name King Wijayaparakramawardhana.

== Personal life ==
Suhita was arranged to marry her close relative, Prince Ratnapangkaja. He was son of Surawardhani and Ranamanggala Dyah Sumirat. He was whose mother was Suhita's paternal aunt, and father was a son of Dyah Sotor, Hayam Wuruk's agnatic half-brother.

== Legend ==
The Damarwulan legend is associated with her reign, as it involves a maiden queen (Prabu Kenya in the story), and during Suhita's reign, there was a war with Blambangan as in the legend.

A notable monumental sculpture found in Tulungagung Regency, East Java has been identified by some authors as of Suhita. She is dressed in royal attire, including ear pendants, necklaces, bracelets, anklets, and pendants hung from several girdles. In her right hand, she holds a lotus bud, which symbolizes deceased royalty in transformation.

== Ancestry ==
Singhawardhana; 1st Prince of Paguhan
Wikramawardhana; Bhra Hyang Wisesa; 5th King of Majapahit
Kertawardhana; 1st Prince of Tumapel
Rajasaduhiteswari; 1st Princess of Pajang
Tribhuwanotunggadewi; 3rd Queen of Majapahit
Suhita; 6th Queen of Majapahit
Kertawardhana; 1st Prince of Tumapel
Rajasanagara; 4th King of Majapahit
Tribhuwanotunggadewi; 3rd Queen of Majapahit
Kusumawardhani; 1st Princess of Kabalan; 3rd Princess of Lasem
Wijayarajasa; Bhra Parameswara of Pamotan; 1st Prince of Wengker
Paduka Sori

== Notes ==
Preceded by Wikramawardhana	Monarch of Majapahit Empire; 1429–1447	Succeeded by Kertawijaya
