= Pararaton =

Old Kawi literary classic

Modern early 20th century printed edition of the Pararaton

The Pararaton (Book of Kings), also known as the Katuturanira Ken Angrok (Story of Ken Angrok), is a 16th-century Javanese historical chronicle written in Kawi (Old Javanese). The comparatively short text of 32 folio-size pages (1126 lines) contains the history of the kings of Singhasari and Majapahit in eastern Java.

The Pararaton opens with a formal incarnation of the founder of the Singhasari kingdom (1222–1292), Ken Arok (or Ken Angrok). Almost half of the manuscript is the story of Ken Arok's career before he acceded to the throne in 1222. This part is mythical. There then follows several shorter narrative fragments in chronological order. Many of the events recorded here are dated. Towards the end, the pieces of history become shorter and shorter and are mixed with genealogical information concerning the members of the royal family of the Majapahit empire.

Since the oldest colophon in the manuscripts contains the date 1522 Saka (1600 AD), the final part of the text must have been written between 1481 and 1600 AD.

== Title ==
This chronicle is most commonly known as the Pararaton, a title which does not appear in the body of the text, but only in the colophons of around half of the surviving manuscripts. The body of the text itself begins with the statement: "Thus follows the Story of Ken Angrok" (nihan katuturanira Ken Angrok), which indicates that this was the original title of the text or at least of its first part, which focuses on Ken Angrok's life. The edition of the text published by Jan Laurens Andries Brandes furnishes both alternative titles: Serat Pararaton atawa Katuturanira Ken Angrok ("The Book of Kings, or the Story of Ken Angrok"). The addition of serat, a Modern Javanese term for "book", seems to have been an innovation by Brandes. It is inappropriate to refer to the Pararaton as a serat, because it does not belong to the Modern Javanese tradition in which serat are found. Furthermore, no manuscript of the Pararaton refers to the text as a serat.

The most widely acceptable title for this text is the Pararaton, often translated as Book of Kings. This term is a nominal derivation from the stem ratu ("monarch"). In the Pararaton itself, the word ratu is completely gender-neutral, so it should be translated as "monarch" or "royal", rather than as "king". The analysis of the derivation from ratu to pararaton is not fully certain, but the morphology denotes plurality. Thus, the term pararaton can best be translated into English as The Monarchs or The Royals.

== Prelude ==
The Pararaton commences with a brief prelude telling how Ken Arok incarnated himself when he became the king. He offered himself as a human sacrifice to Yamadipati, the Hindu God of Death, to save himself from death. As a reward, he was promised that upon his death he would return to Vishnu's heaven and be reborn as a superior king of Singhasari.

The promise was fulfilled. Ken Arok was begotten by Brahma a newly-wed peasant woman. On his birth, his mother laid him in a graveyard where his body, effulgent with light, attracted the attention of Ki Lembong, a passing thief. Ki Lembong adopted him, raised him, and taught him all of his arts. Ken Arok indulged in gambling, plunder, and rapine. In the manuscript, it is written as such that Ken Arok was saved many times by divine intervention. There is a scene in Mount Kryar Lejar wherein Gods descend in a conference and Batara Guru declares Ken Arok his son. Ken Arok is also destined to bring stability and power to Java.

The prelude of the Pararaton is followed by the meeting of Ken Arok with Lohgawe, a Brahmana who came from India to make sure Batara Guru's instructions were fulfilled. It was Lohgawe who asked Ken Arok to meet Tunggul Ametung, ruler of Tumapel. Ken Arok then killed Tunggul Ametung to gain possession of Ametung's wife, Ken Dedes, and also the throne of Singashari.

== Analysis of the manuscript ==
Some parts of the Pararaton cannot be accounted as historical facts. Especially in the prelude, fact and fiction, fantasy and reality go together. Scholars such as C. C. Berg argued that texts such as these are entirely supernatural and ahistorical, and intended not to record the past, but instead determine future events. (Note: cited in) However, the majority of scholars accept some historicity in the Pararaton, noting numerous correspondences with other inscriptions and Chinese sources, and accept the manuscript's frame of reference within which a valid interpretation is conceivable.

The manuscript was written under the Javanese kingship. For the Javanese people, it was the function of the ruler to link the present with the past and the future and to give human life its appropriate place in the cosmic order. The king, in the Javanese realm, is the sacral embodiment of the total state, just as his palace is a microcosmic copy of the macrocosmos. The king (or a founder of a dynasty) possesses an innate divinity to a far higher degree than ordinary men.

Hans Ras in 2001 compared the Pararaton with the Pallava Canggal inscription (732 AD), the Śivagŗha (Siwagrha) inscription (856 AD), the Calcutta Stone (1041 AD) and the Babad Tanah Jawi (1836 AD). These show clear similarities in character, structure, and function and also similarity with texts from the Malay historiography.

== Editions ==
- J. Brandes: Pararaton (Ken Arok) of het boek der Koningen van Tumapěl en van Majapahit. 1896. (Text and Dutch translation; online: wikimedia.org; Sĕrat Pararaton on wikisource.org)
  - J. Padmapuspita: Pararaton: teks bahasa Kawi, terdjemahan bahasa Indonesia. 1966.
  - Kitab Pararaton: terjemahan. (Indonesian translation; online: wikimedia.org)
  - Anunama: 𑼦𑼬𑼬𑼡𑼾𑼴𑼥𑽁 (Pararaton in Kawi script). 2017. ISBN 9781545201725
  - Anunama: ꦥꦫꦫꦠꦺꦴꦤ꧀ (Pararaton in Javanese script). 2017. ISBN 9781545202067
- Javanese adaptation by R.M. Mangkudimedja: ꦱꦼꦫꦠ꧀ ꦥꦫꦫꦡꦺꦴꦤ꧀. Vol. 1, 1912. (Online: wikisource.org)
  - H.P. Hardjana: Serat Pararaton/Ken Arok. Vol. 1, 1979. (Online: wikimedia.org)
