= Demak–Majapahit conflicts =

1478 conflict in Java

Demak-Majapahit conflicts
- Part of Islamization of Indonesia
Date	1478–1527
Location	Central and East Java
Result	Demak victory; Fall of the Majapahit Empire; Majapahit royal court fled to Bali; Spread of Islam in Java

Belligerents
Majapahit Empire	Demak Sultanate

Commanders and leaders
Girindrawardhana †; Udara	Raden Patah; Kertabhumi †; Sunan Ngudung †; Sunan Kudus

The Demak-Majapahit conflicts were a series of conflicts between the rising Demak Sultanate and the waning Majapahit Empire. It marked the defeat of forces loyal to the legitimate Majapahit ruler, Bhre Kertabhumi (Prince Kertabhumi), by Girindrawardhana, son of Singhavikramavardhana, and the independence of the Demak Sultanate under Raden Patah. 1478 is used to date the end of the Majapahit Empire. The Sudarma Wisuta was the second biggest war in ancient Java. The war ended in stalemate as Girindrawardhana killed Demak commander (General Ngundung) and Demak Forces destroyed Girindrawardhana logistics.

This battle was a strategic victory for Demak, because after the battle the Demak power and forces grew dramatically. This battle was the last chance for Daha to conquer Demak, because after this battle Daha lost its numerical advantage.

== Background ==
The Demak Sultanate was founded by Raden Patah in 1475. According to Babad Tanah Jawi, he was the son of Kertabhumi and a Chinese concubine. In 1468, Kertabhumi usurped Singhavikramavardhana, exiling him to Daha, and reigned as Brawijaya V of Majapahit. However, Singhavikramavardhana's son Girindrawardhana consolidated a power base in Daha to retake the throne. He was supported by religious tensions. To keep Majapahit influence and economic interest, Kertabhumi had awarded Muslim merchant trading rights on the north coast of Java, an action that supported the Demak Sultanate. The policy increased Majapahit's economy and influence, but weakened Hindu-Buddhism's position as the dominant religion, as Islam began to spread more freely in Java.

== Attack on Trowulan ==
The conflict came to a head in 1478. The Pararaton states, ".... bhre Kertabhumi ..... bhre prabhu sang mokta ring kadaton i saka sunyanora-yuganing-wong, 1400". (Note: The date is known as 1400 Saka) In that year, Girindrawardhana's army under general Udara breached Trowulan's defences and killed Bhre Kertabhumi in his palace. Demak sent reinforcements under Sunan Ngudung, who died in battle and was replaced by Sunan Kudus. Although they managed to repel the invading army, they came too late to save Kertabhumi. In the Trailokyapuri Jiwu and Petak inscriptions, Girindrawardhana claimed the defeat of Kertabhumi, and that with it he reunited Majapahit as one kingdom.

After the conflict, Girindrawardhana reigned as Brawijaya VI of Majapahit until he was killed and replaced by Prabu Udara in 1498, but Demak gained independence and was a sovereign state no longer subject to the Majapahit Empire. The conflict led to continued war between Demak and the Majapahit rump in Daha, since Demak rulers claimed descent from Kertabhumi. This ended with the defeat of Prabu Udara and the fall of Daha in 1527.

== Legacy ==
Today, 1478 is commemorated among Javanese with the candrasengkala sirna ilang kertaning bumi (sirna = 0, ilang = 0, kerta = 4, bumi = 1, interpreted as 1400 Saka) (lost and gone is the pride of the land).
