= Assault of Riau =

16th century expedition assault

- Part of Malacca–Majapahit conflict
| Date | around the 15th century |
| Location | Malay Archipelago, Riau |
| Result | Malaccan victory; Islamization of Riau |
| Territorial changes | Riau was annexed by Malacca Sultanate |

Belligerents
| Malacca Sultanate | Majapahit Empire |

Commanders and leaders
| Mansur Shah; Mahmud Shah | Girindrawardhana |

The Assault of Riau took place in the 15th century during the wider Malacca–Majapahit conflict, the fighting occurred during the decline of Majapahit when numerous Islamic states spread Islam in the region, and saw Majapahit and other local Javanese kingdoms eventually dissolve.

The Malaccans who had started the assault on Majapahit, and sailed across from Malacca to Sumatra. Local Javanese Muslim states were also pushing Majapahit forces to collapse, by local Muslim states such as Mataram Sultanate, Aceh Sultanate, Demak Sultanate and others.

== Prelude ==
In earlier times, Riau had ruled over the mahapatih (vicegerent) of the Majapahit Empire, Gajah Mada. While Majapahit used to control Riau, an early kingdom in existence before Java was under Srivijaya. Although the kingdom of Srivijaya itself was mostly recognized as a powerful maritime empire, they had unexpectedly been attacked by the Cholas led by the leader Rajendra I, who led the Chola incursion upon Srivijaya.

== Aftermath ==
Following the aftermath of the Riau attack, Islam had spread over the entire territory of Riau by Malacca, the latter probably enforced the non-Muslim Majapahit to convert to Islam.

In Java, Majapahit power had weakened by the 15th century. Samudera Pasai had also declined, as Malaccan forces made an expedition to Riau during their rivalry with Sumatra and surrounding islands, as mention by a Portuguese account.
