= Demak invasions of Malacca =

- Part of Portuguese colonization of Indonesia
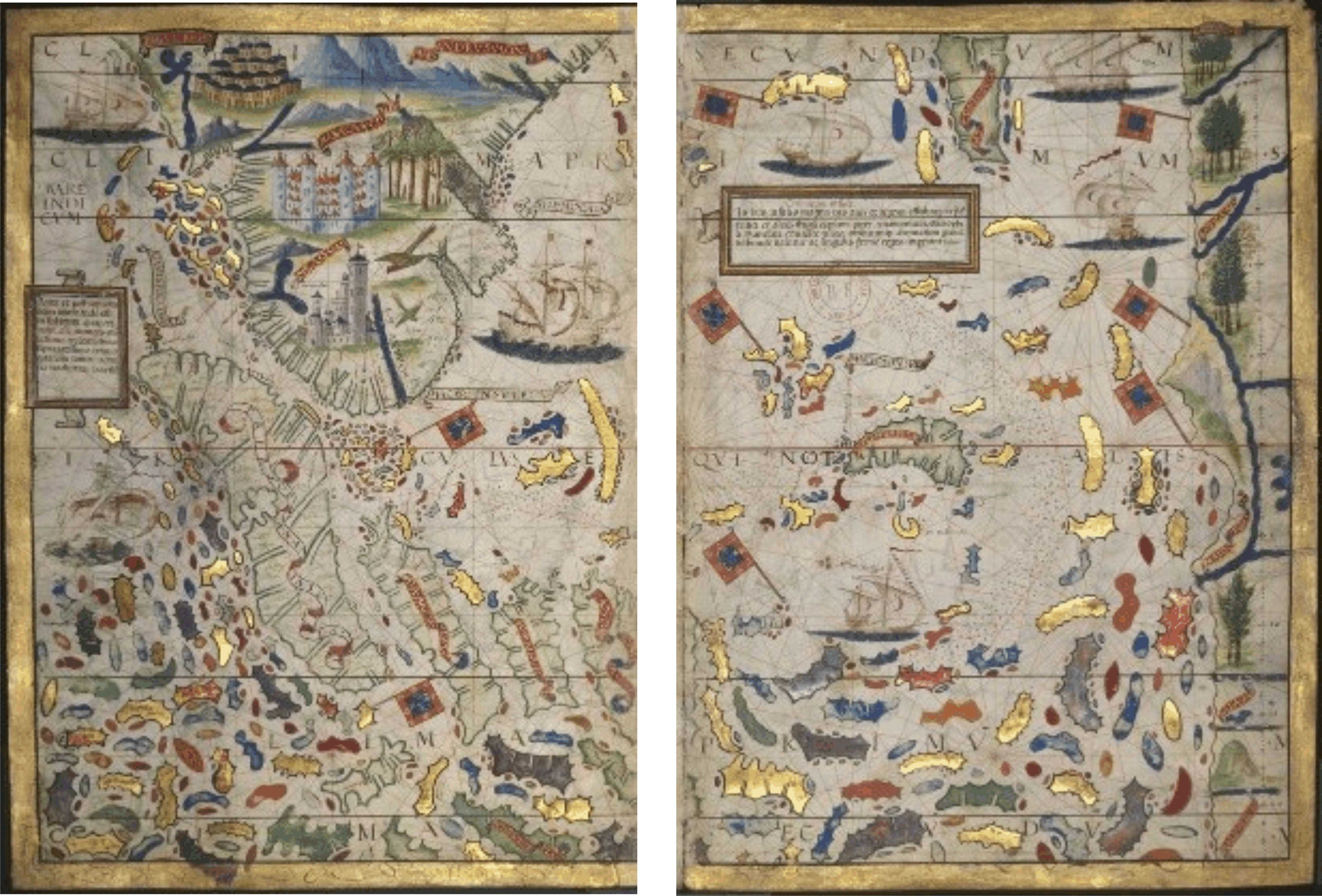
- Atlas Miller map, including Insulindia, c. 1519
Date	1512–1521
Location	Malaysia & Indonesia
Result	Portuguese victory

Belligerents
Kingdom of Portugal; Portuguese Malacca	Demak Sultanate; Cirebon Sultanate; Palembang Sultanate; Malacca Sultanate

Commanders and leaders
Fernão de Andrade	Raden Patah; Pati Unus †

The Demak invasions of Malacca were a series of military expeditions launched by the Demak Sultanate against Portuguese Malacca following its capture in 1511.

== Background ==
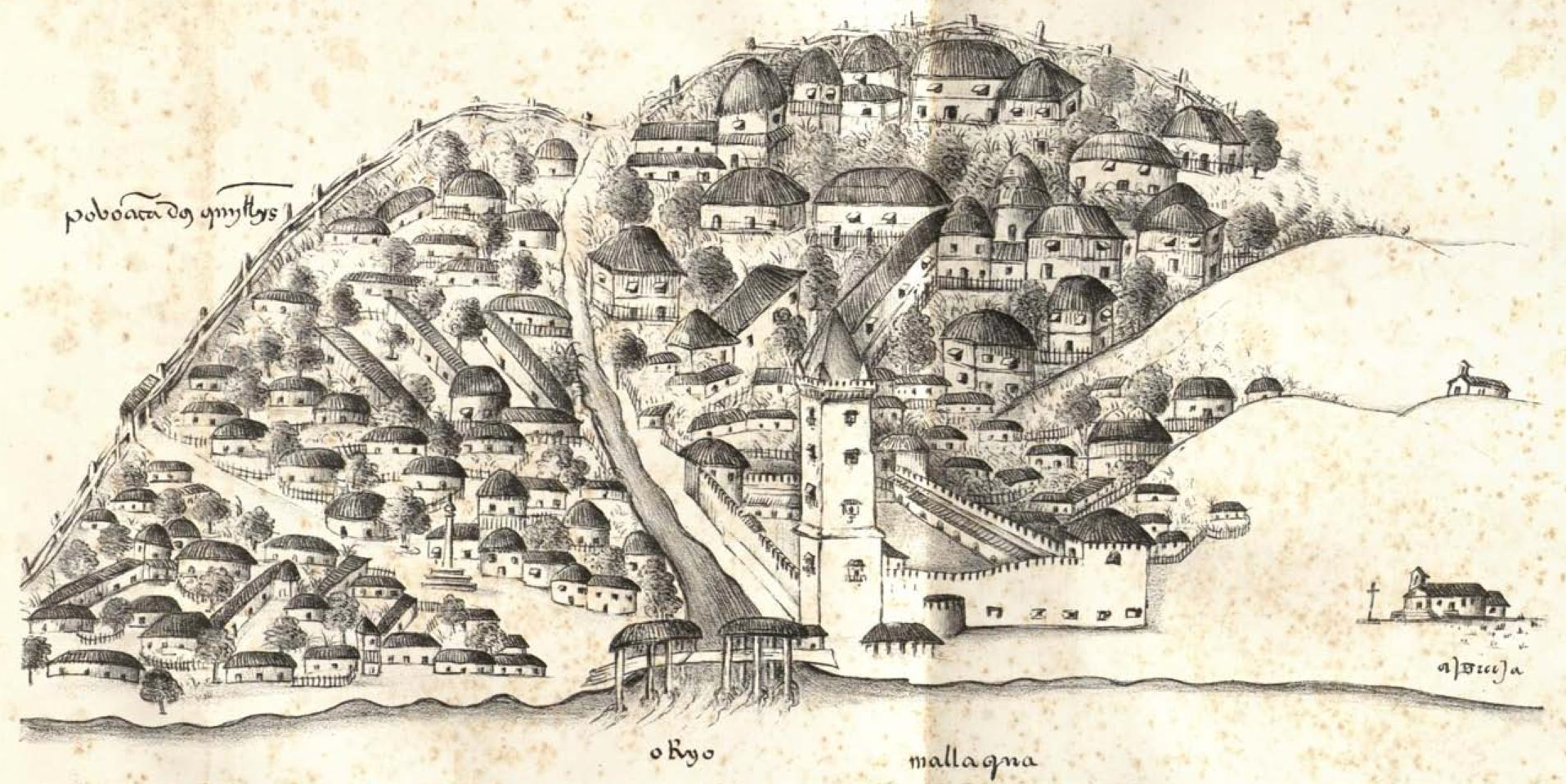
Portuguese Malacca in Lendas da India by Gaspar Correia, c. 1550–1563

The fall of Malacca in 1511 AD to the Portuguese actually provided significant benefits for trade activities in the capital of Demak. However, this did not mean there was no concern or awareness regarding their presence.

The Portuguese domination of the strait made many trading ships hesitant to pass through Malacca when transporting goods, fearing that their cargo would be plundered. As a result, traders from the Nusantara region sought alternative routes for trade, opting to pass through the Sunda Strait and then westward along the western coast of Sumatra.

== Battle of Malacca, 1512 ==
In 1512, Raden Patah, the Sultan of Demak, launched an attack on Malacca to prevent the Portuguese from entering the region. However, the attempt failed, and by 1513, the Portuguese had successfully seized Malacca.

== Battle of Malacca, 1513 ==
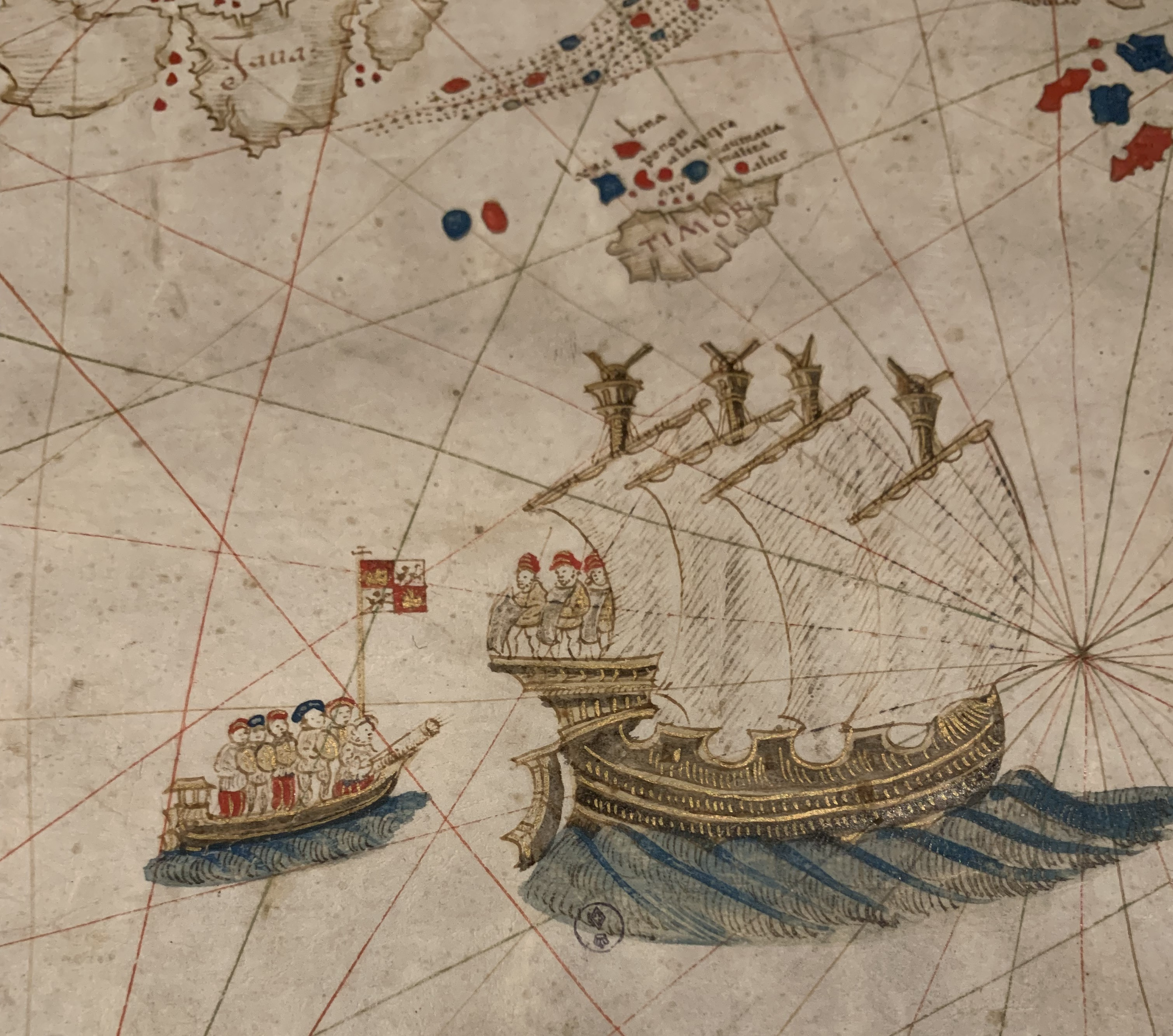
Portuguese illustration of the warship Djong, 1522

In A.D. 1513 (Heg. 919), Pati Unus, a Malay chief from Java, launched an attempt to reclaim Malacca from the Portuguese. He set sail with a fleet of 90–100 ships and an army of 5,000 troops, later reinforced to 12,000.

Malacca was under the governor Fernão Pires de Andrade, who, with three hundred and fifty Europeans and some natives aboard seventeen galleys, confronted Pati Unus's fleet. The Portuguese drove the forces toward the Moar river, where they sunk and burned most of the vessels. Pati Unus barely escaped and had lost eight thousand men and sixty of his largest ships.

== Battle of Malacca, 1521 ==
Demak Sultanate's conquests and expeditions

After succeeding Sultan Raden Patah as the second Sultan of Demak, Pati Unus led a second expedition to Malacca with 375 ships in 1521. However, this second assault on the Portuguese would fail, and the Sultan would die in battle, earning him the title "Pangeran Sabrang Lor".

== Aftermath ==
The success of the Portuguese defense of Malacca gave them free control over spice trade ports in the Nusantara Archipelago.

Meanwhile, the newly crowned Sultan of Demak, Trenggana, instructed Fatahillah to conquer Banten. After doing so, he proceeded to conquer Sunda Kelapa and expelled the Portuguese from Java.

== Bibliography ==
- Begbie, Peter James (1834). The Malayan Peninsula Embracing Its History, Manners and Customs of the Inhabitants, Politics, Natural History, Etc. from Its Earliest Records. University of Oxford.
- Press, Atlantis (December 26, 2023). Proceeding of the 3rd International Conference on Social Knowledge Sciences and Education (ICSKSE) 2023"Change and Continuity in Southeast Asia". Atlantis Press. ISBN 9782384761685.
- Khamdan, Muh (April 2022). Politik Identitas dan Perebutan Hegemoni Kuasa. Penerbit A-Empat. ISBN 9786236289662.
- UIN Sunan Ampel Surabaya (2024). "Bab 4" (PDF). Digilib UIN Sunan Ampel Surabaya.
- Maulana, Wildhan Ichzha; Astana, Cornelius Bayu; Wijayanti, Finna; Kumalasari, Dyah (June 2024). "Maritime Activities of the Demak Sultanate: Shipping and Trade Route in the Nusantara Network (1478–1546)". Journal of Al-Tamaddun. 19 (1): 261–272. doi:10.22452/JAT.vol19no1.19.
