= Sunan Walilanang =

Introducer of Islam to Java

Sunan Walilanang is, according to the Babad Tanah Jawi ("History of the land of Java") manuscripts, one of the nine Wali Sanga ("Nine Saints") to whom Indonesian legend attributes the establishment of Islam as the dominant religion amongst the Javanese, Indonesia's largest ethnic group.

== See also ==
- Islam in Indonesia
- The spread of Islam in Indonesia
