= Sunan Murya =

One of nine Islamic saints in Java

Kangjeng Susuhunan Muria
- Born: Raden Umar Said
- Died: 1551; Dawe, Kudus
- Era: Demak Sultanate, Cirebon Sultanate, Banten Sultanate
- Organization: Walisongo
- Title: Kangjeng Susuhunan Muria
- Father: Sunan Kalijaga

Sunan Muria (or Muria) is, according to the Babad Tanah Jawi ("History of the land of Java") manuscripts, one of the nine Wali Sanga ("nine saints") involved in propagating Islam in Indonesia.

He was born as Raden Umar Said, as the son of Raden Said (Sunan Kalijaga).

A big distinction of Sunan Muria - apart from the other Sunans - was his very close relationship with the common people. He tended to spread his teaching in rural and remote areas, including teaching local people in agriculture, fishery, and other things.

A nearby mountain, Mount Muria, has been named after him.

== See also ==
- Islam in Indonesia
- The spread of Islam in Indonesia
