= Malacca–Majapahit conflict =

15th-century war in Sumatra

Malacca-Majapahit conflict
Date	c. 15th century
Location	Sumatra
Result	Malaccan victory
Territorial changes	Majapahit territories in Sumatra and smaller surrounding islands ceded to Malacca

Belligerents
Malacca Sultanate	Majapahit Empire

Commanders and leaders
Muzaffar Shah; Mansur Shah; Mahmud Shah (until 1500)	Girindrawardhana (surrendered)

The Malacca–Majapahit conflict occurred during the 15th-century when the Malacca Sultanate began to assert its dominance over the Strait of Malacca and its surrounding areas. After its establishment in the late 14th-century, Malacca became a growing power in Maritime Southeast Asia. Meanwhile, the erstwhile great power of the region, the Majapahit Empire, attempted to curb Malacca's growing influence and power. Events and progress of the conflict were depicted in the Malay Annals.

The two states wrestled over territories in and around the Strait of Malacca, mainly Sumatra and the Malay Peninsula. Nevertheless, political manoeuvres, diplomatic policies and religious proselytization often played more important roles in shaping the fortunes of the rival states rather than military confrontation.

== Background ==
=== Majapahit's role in Malacca's founding ===
In the 14th century, a Malay Kingdom of Singapura was established, and it promptly attracted a Majapahit navy that regarded it as Tumasik, a rebellious colony. Singapura was finally sacked by Majapahit in 1398, after approximately 1 month long siege by 300 jong and 200,000 men. The last king, Parameswara, fled to the west coast of the Malay Peninsula to establish the Melaka Sultanate in 1400.

Following the establishment of his new city in Malacca, Parameswara began to develop the city and laid the foundation of a trade port. The Orang Laut, were employed to patrol the adjacent sea areas, to repel pirates, and to direct traders to Malacca. Within years, news about Malacca becoming a centre of trade and commerce began to spread across the eastern part of the world.

In 1405, the Yongle Emperor of the Ming dynasty (r. 1402–1424) sent his envoy headed by Yin Qing to Malacca. Yin Qing's visit paved the way for the establishment of friendly relations between Malacca and China. Two years later, Admiral Zheng He made his first of six visits to Malacca. Zheng He called at Malacca and brought Parameswara with him on his return to China, a recognition of his position as ruler of Malacca.

== History ==
=== Skirmish over Eastern Sumatra ===
The Malaccans sailed across the Straits and eventually reached the coast of Riau—still under Majapahit rule at the time—and launched their first assault there. As the attack unfolded, many of the Javanese population and remnants of Majapahit leadership, including Girindrawardhana, were either forced to flee or were killed. Following this, the Malaccans also forced the Majapahit people, who adhered to a form of Hinduism, into converting to Islam.

=== Chinese support for Malacca ===
The Chinese Ming dynasty provided systematic support to Malacca, and its sultan made at least one trip to personally pay obeisance to the Ming emperor. Malacca actively encouraged the conversion to Islam in the region, while the Ming fleet actively established Chinese-Malay Muslim community in coastal northern Java, thus created a permanent opposition to the Hindus of Java. By 1430, the expeditions had established Muslim Chinese, Arab and Malay communities in northern ports of Java such as Semarang, Demak, Tuban, and Ampel; thus Islam began to gain a foothold on the northern coast of Java. Malacca prospered under Chinese Ming protection, while the Majapahit were steadily pushed back.

=== Growth of Islam in Maritime Southeast Asia ===
Previously, Majapahit had succeeded in asserting its influence in Malacca strait by containing the aspiration of Malay polities in Sumatra and the Malay Peninsula to ever reach the geopolitical might like those of Srivijaya. The Hindu Majapahit was the most powerful maritime power in Southeast Asian seas at that time and were opposed to Chinese expansion into their sphere of influence. The Ming's support for Malacca and the spread of Islam propagated by both Malacca and Zheng He's treasure fleet has weakened Majapahit maritime influence in Sumatra, which caused the northern part of the island to increasingly convert to Islam and gain independence from Majapahit, leaving Indragiri, Jambi and Palembang, remnants of the old Srivijaya, the only suzerainty under Majapahit in Sumatra, bordering Pagaruyung Kingdom on the west and independent Muslim kingdoms on the north.

=== Expansion of Malacca at Majapahit's expense ===
The reign of Mansur Shah (r. 1459–1477) witnessed a major expansion of the sultanate. Among the earliest territory ceded to the sultanate was Pahang, with its capital, Inderapura—a massive unexplored land with a large river and abundant source of gold.

When the court of Majapahit was divided, the kingdom found itself unable to control its western part of the already crumbling empire. The rising power of the Sultanate of Malacca began to gain effective control of the Malacca Strait in the mid-15th century and expand its influence to Sumatra. And amidst these events, Indragiri and Siantan, according to Malay Annals were given to Malacca as a dowry for the marriage of a Majapahit princess and the sultan of Malacca, further weakening Majapahit's influence on the western part of the archipelago.

== Aftermath ==
Malacca continued the traditions once held by Srivijaya, particularly in maintaining control over key occupations and promoting international trade. Primarily, it was known for securing protection of the sea lanes. The rulers of the Malacca Sultanate, like those of Srivijaya before them, commanded the loyalty of various Orang Laut ("Sea People"), who protected Malacca's maritime clients and disrupted rival ports by attacking their shipping routes.

Kertabhumi managed to stabilize this situation by allying with Muslim merchants, giving them trading rights on the north coast of Java, with Demak as its centre and in return asked for their loyalty to Majapahit. This policy boosted the Majapahit treasury and power but weakened Hindu-Buddhism as its main religion because Islamic proselytizing spread faster, especially in Javanese coastal principalities. Hindu-Buddhist followers' grievances later paved the way for Ranawijaya to defeat Kertabumi.

== Bibliography ==
- Abshire, Jean E. (2011), The History of Singapore, Greenwood, ISBN 978-0-313-37742-6
- Ahmad Sarji, Abdul Hamid (2011), The Encyclopedia of Malaysia, vol. 16 – The Rulers of Malaysia, Editions Didier Millet, ISBN 978-981-3018-54-9
- Andaya, Barbara Watson; Andaya, Leonard Yuzon (2001) [1982], A History of Malaysia, London: Palgrave Macmillan, ISBN 0-333-27672-8
- Nadia, Khadim (2021). "The Islamic Sultanate of Malacca" (PDF). Palarch's Journal of Archeology of Egypt/Egyptology. 18 (5): 20.
- Ricklefs, M. C. (2001). A History of Modern Indonesia since c. 1200 (3rd ed.). Stanford University Press. p. 524. ISBN 978-0-8047-4480-5.
- Ricklefs, M. C. (1993). A History of Modern Indonesia since c. 1300 (2nd ed.). Stanford University Press. p. 396. ISBN 978-0-8047-2195-0.
- Sabrizain, Palembang Prince or Singapore Renegade?
- Tsang, Susan; Perera, Audrey (2011), Singapore at Random, Didier Millet, ISBN 978-981-4260-37-4
- Wade, Geoff (2005), Southeast Asia in the Ming Shi-lu: an open access resource, Asia Research Institute and the Singapore E-Press, National University of Singapore
- Wilkinson, R.J. (1912). "The Malacca Sultanate". Journal of the Straits Branch of the Royal Asiatic Society (61). JSTOR: 67–71. JSTOR 41561668.
- Wilkinson, R.J. (June 1912). "The Malacca Sultanate". Journal of the Malayan Branch of the Royal Asiatic Society. 13 (6): 67–71. JSTOR 41559839.
