= Dharmaputra (official title) =

Position in Majapahit

Dharmaputra was the position formed by Raden Wijaya from Majapahit. Members of the Dharmaputra were: Ra Kuti, Ra Semi, Ra Tanca, Ra Wedeng, Ra Banyak, and Ra Pangsa. These seven men of the Dharmaputra were killed during the reign of Jayanegara.

== Titles and positions ==
The Dharmaputra is mentioned in the Pararaton. This position has not appeared in any other historical sources, including in the Nagarakretagama, or any inscription by the kings of Majapahit. Pararaton mentioned Dharmaputra as the "pengalasan wineh suka", translated as "special officials by the Kings". The Dharmaputra was appointed by Raden Wijaya, but in 1328 they disappeared from any historical sources.

== Ra Semi rebellion ==
Kidung Soradaka mentions that in 1316, Patih Nambi's father, Paranaraja, died in Lumajang. Ra Semi went to Lumajang with the mourners from Majapahit. There, Mahapati falsely accused Nambi of rebellion. The king of Majapahit at that time was Jayanagara, the son of Raden Wijaya. Because he already believed in Mahapati's incitement, he sent troops to punish Nambi.

When the Majapahit forces arrived to Lumajang, Ra Semi and the other mourners were still there. Ra Semi decided to join Nambi. Nambi, his followers, and Ra Semi were eventually killed.

== Ra Kuti rebellion ==
Pararaton further tells of the rebellion of the Dharmaputras led by Ra Kuti in 1319. This rebellion took place directly in the capital city of Majapahit and was much more dangerous than the Ra Semi rebellion. Despite this, Jayanagara and his family managed to escape by being escorted by Bhayangkari soldiers led by Gajah Mada.

After bringing the king to safety in the village of Badander, Gajah Mada returned to the capital to seek support. He gathered the officials at the house of the tumenggung amancanegara (a kind of mayor) and reported that Jayanagara had died in the refugee camp. The officials appeared to mourn his reported death. After believing that Ra Kuti's rebellion did not have the support of the people, Gajah Mada told revealed that the king was still alive.

Finally, with the good cooperation between Gajah Mada, the officials, and all the people of the capital, Ra Kuti and his accomplices were successfully destroyed. Ra Kuti was a Majapahit official from the Pajarakan area, which is now part of Probolinggo Regency.

== Ra Tanca incidents ==
Ra Tanca was the only Dharmaputra official who lived after the Ra Kuti rebellions in 1319.

In 1328 Ra Tanca met Gajah Mada to report his wife's complaints. Ra Tanca's wife heard the news that Jayanagara forbade her two younger sisters, namely Dyah Gitarja and Dyah Wiyat, to get married. Jayanagara reportedly intended to marry both his younger sisters. Tanca asked Gajah Mada, who was Jayanagara's favorite servant at that time, to take preventive measures. However, Gajah Mada did not seem to care about Ra Tanca's report. This offended Ra Tanca.

Ra Tanca was one of the great physician doctors in Majapahit's palace. One day, he got called by Jayanegara to heal an ulcer he suffered from. In the king's chamber there were only him, Jayanagara, and Gajah Mada. After performing surgical therapy, Tanca suddenly stabbed Jayanagara to death. Immediately Gajah Mada attacked Tanca.

According to Pararaton, at that time, Gajah Mada was serving as the patih of Daha, where the king was Dyah Wiyat. Gajah Mada deliberately provoked Tanca's anger by pretending that he did not care so that Tanca himself took action. Tanca killed the king and then was immediately killed by Gajah Mada as if to remove traces.
