= Raden Kusen =

Duke of Terung

- Duke of Terung
- Born: 1456; Palembang, Majapahit Empire
- Died: c. 1500; Kudus, Demak Sultanate
- Burial: Sunan Kudus Grave, Kudus, Demak Sultanate
- Spouse: Nyai Mertasari
- Issue: Pangeran Ario Kesuma Ambarawa Cirebon
Names
- Raden Husain
- Dynasty: Rajasa dynasty
- Religion: Sunni Islam

Raden Kusen, also known as Kin San, was the Duke of Terung and one of the last commanders of the Majapahit Imperial Army. His father was the Duke of Palembang, Arya Damar while his mother was Siu Ban Ci, the former concubine of Majapahit Emperor. He was a half-brother of Raden Patah, the founder of the Demak Sultanate. He supposedly was to succeed his father at the Duchy of Palembang, as the Duke of Palembang, but he along with his brother moved to Java island. His descendants, the sultans of Palembang from the 17th century until 19th century were his rightful successors.

== Origin of Raden Kusen ==
According to Babad Tanah Jawi, Emperor Brawijaya V, had many concubines, one of whom was the Chinese princess of Kyai Batong (aka Tan Go Hwat), Siu Ban Ci, who was envied by the Empress, Queen Dwarawati, the princess of Champa. Brawijaya was forced to give Siu Ban Ci to his duke in Palembang, Arya Damar. The Duke found Siu Ban Ci pregnant as a result of marriage with the Emperor who later gave birth to a child named Raden Hasan later known as Raden Patah. Then the Duke married Siu Ban Ci and had a son named Raden Husain/Kin San. He was raised with his brother, by his father as Muslims.

== Adventure to Java ==
Raden Husain with Raden Hasan then began his journey to Java. They stopped in Cirebon to study with Sunan Gunung Jati, Raden Kusen married Sunan Gunung Jati's daughter named Nyai Mertasari, also known as Nyaimas Ranggaluwung and blessed with 4 children named Raden Surodirejo (future Duke of Palembang), Raden Santri (future Prince Aryo Kesumo), Ariyo Timbul, and Ariyo Balitar. Raden Patah continued his journey to meet and learn with Sunan Ampel at Surabaya. Meanwhile, Raden Kusen served the Emperor at Majapahit.

== Serving the Majapahit Empire ==
Raden Kusen was given land in the Duchy of Terung, meanwhile, Raden Patah opened a new village in Demak Bintoro, at the behest of Sunan Ampel. Knowing that his son was opening a new land, Emperor Brawijaya called Raden Patah before him. The Duke of Terung then captured his own half-brother to be brought to the Imperial court. Instead of punishing him for not paying tribute, Raden Patah was tasked to become the Duke of Demak.

== Rebellion by Brawijaya VI ==
After that in 1478, there was a coup d'état carried out by Girindrawardhana of Kediri to Emperor Brawijaya, he appointed himself Emperor of Majapahit with the title Brawijaya VI. All Duchies including duchy of Terung (and Raden Kusen) must submit to the new emperor. Not with Raden Patah, who knew that his father was overthrown by the new emperor. The Duke of Demak, who felt that he was most entitled to succeed to the throne of Majapahit Empire, then broke away from Brawijaya VI's Territory, and established the Sultanate of Demak, an Islamic Kingdom because many of the Dukes of Majapahit at that time had embraced Islam on the Da'wah of the Walisongo and with the permission of Allah Azza Wa Jalla.

== War with Demak ==
During the reign of Raden Patah, he gathered an army led by Sunan Ngudung, the father of Sunan Kudus, to attack the Majapahit capital and overthrow Brawijaya VI. The Emperor prepared an army led by the Duke of Terung. The two armies met at the border on the banks of the Sedayu River. At first, the two commanders decided to keep their troops at bay. After 4 years of uncertainty, the troops were dissatisfied and urged the Duke of Terung to order an attack. The Imperial army finally routed the Muslim army, plus the killing of Sunan Ngudung by a spear stuck in the chest by the Duke of Terung reduced the morale of the Muslim troops and forced them to retreat. After several decades, Sultan of Demak again prepared an army stronger than the first attack, the Duke of Terung was again trusted to be the commander because of his previous success, but fate smiled on the Imperial Army as the Muslim army was victorious. The Duke of Terung (Raden Kusen) lost his duchy and fled towards Blambangan, and the Demak Sultanate razed the once mighty Imperial Capital marking the end of the Hindu era.

== Join with Demak ==
After that, Raden Kusen went to the capital of Demak Sultanate to surrender himself. Raden Patah accepted Raden Kusen's surrender (actually not surrendering himself but Raden Fatah met Raden Husain or Raden Kusen to help him manage Demak). Raden Kusen died peacefully at Kudus.
