= Sunan Bayat =

Sunan Bayat is often mentioned in the Javanese manuscripts of the Babad Tanah Jawi ("History of the land of Java") as one of the Wali Sanga (nine saints), although the chronicles do not generally consider Bayat as one of the main wali. The Wali Sanga are associated with establishing Islam as the dominant religion amongst the Javanese, the largest ethnic group in Indonesia.

Sunan Bayat is said to have been an employee of a female rice merchant.

== See also ==
- Islam in Indonesia
