= Raden Patah =

Sultan of Demak (1475–1518)

Raden Patah 靳文
- Sultan Shah Alam Akbar (According to Serat Pranitiradya); Sultan Surya Alam (Hikayat Banjar); Pate Rodim (Suma Oriental)
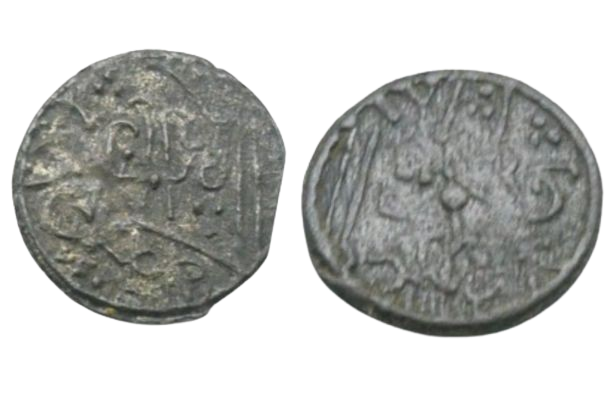
- Coinage of Raden Patah (15th–16th century), Sumatran Numismatic Museum.

Sultan of Demak
- Reign: 1475 – 1518
- Coronation: 1518
- Successor: Pati Unus
- Born: 1455; Palembang, Majapahit Kingdom
- Died: 1518 (aged 62–63); Demak, Demak Sultanate
- Burial: Demak Mosque, Demak, Demak Sultanate
- Spouse: Solekha
- Issue: Raden Kikin; Ratu Mas Nyawa; Raden Surya; Raden Trenggana
Names
- Jin Wen
Regnal name
- Senapati Jimbun Ningrat Ngabdurahman Panembahan Palembang Sayidin Panatagama
- Dynasty: Demak
- Religion: Sunni Islam

Raden Patah, also known as Jin Bun (Javanese: ꦫꦢꦺꦤ꧀ꦦꦠꦃ; Chinese: 靳文; pinyin: Jìn wén) (1455 in Jepara – 1518 in Demak) was the first sultan of the Demak Sultanate. Ascending to the throne in 1475, he remained a vassal of the Majapahit Empire until 1478. Raden Patah took the title Panembahan Jimbun after legitimizing the Sultanate of Demak as the successor state to the Majapahit Empire, with the Wali Sanga appointing him the Sultan of Demak.

The historian Merle Calvin Ricklefs distinguishes Raden Patah from a Muslim named Cek-ko-po, saying that Cek-ko-po was an outsider, most likely from China, who apparently founded the Sultanate of Demak and had a son who might have been named "Rodim", who the Portuguese also referred to by that name. Meanwhile, Tomé Pires, in his book Suma Oriental, said that "Pate Rodim" was the ruler of Demak who ruled the Palembang area. Then, one source said that it is widely believed that the Demak Sultanate was founded in 1500 by a Chinese Muslim named Cek-ko-po or his son, Raden Patah.

He was succeeded by Adipati/Lord Pati Unus and Trenggana.

== Origin ==
Raden Patah has many names, including Praba or Raden Bagus Kasan (Hasan), who has the Chinese name Jin Bun (Chinese: 靳文; pinyin: Jìn wén). He is also called Senapati Jimbun or Panembahan Jimbun, has the title Sultan Syah Alam Akbar al-Fatah. According to Chinese chronicles from the Sam Poo Kong Temple in Semarang, he has a Chinese name, namely Jin Bun, without a surname in front of him, because only his mother is Chinese. Jin Bun means strong person. The name is synonymous with the Arabic name "Fatah" which means victory.

== Early life ==
There are various versions about the origin of the founder of Kerajaan Demak.

According to Babad Tanah Jawi, Raden Patah is thought to have been the son of Brawijaya V, the last king of the Majapahit Empire of a Chinese concubine. This Chinese concubine was the daughter of Kyai Batong (aka Tan Go Hwat). After giving birth to Raden Patah, the Chinese daughter married Arya Damar (aka Swan Liong), giving birth to Raden Kusen (aka Kin San).

According to Purwaka Caruban Nagari, the real name of the Chinese concubine is Siu Ban Ci, Siu Ban Ci daughter of Tan Go Hwat and Siu Te Yo from Gresik. Tan Go Hwat is a trader and scholar with the title Shaykh Bantong (aka Kyai Batong).

According to the Chinese chronicle of the Sam Poo Kong temple, the nickname when Raden Patah was young was Jin Bun, son of Kung-ta-bu-mi (aka Bhre Kertabhumi or Brawijaya V) king of Majapahit of a Chinese concubine. Then the Chinese concubine was given to a half Chinese named Swan Liong in Palembang. Swan Liong is the son of Girishawardhana) from a Chinese concubine. From this second marriage, Kin San (aka Raden Kusen) was born. This Chinese chronicle reports the birth year of Jin Bun as 1455. Therefore, Raden Patah was born before Bhre Kertabhumi was governing the Majapahit Empire (reigned 1474–1478).

According to Slamet Muljana (2005), Babad Tanah Jawi was careless in identifying Brawijaya V as Raden Patah's father as well as Arya Damar's father, more precisely the content of Sam Po Kong's Chinese chronicle script seems more plausible that Swan Liong's father (aka Arya Damar) is Yang-wi-si-sa (楊惟西沙) in contrast to Jin Bun's (aka Raden Patah) father, namely Kung-ta-bu-mi or Kertabhumi aka Brawijaya V.

According to Sejarah Banten, the founder of the Demak Sultanate was named Cu Cu (Gan Eng Wan?), The son (or subordinate) of the former prime minister of China (Haji Gan Eng Cu?) who moved to East Java. Cu Cu served Majapahit and contributed to suppressing the Arya Dilah rebellion, the regent of Palembang. This doesn't add up, as written in Babad Tanah Jawi. Because, Arya Dilah is another name for Arya Damar, Raden Patah's own adoptive father. Furthermore, for his services, Cu Cu became the son-in-law of the king of Majapahit and was made the regent of Demak with the title Arya Sumangsang (Aria Suganda?).

Although there are various versions, it is said that the founder of Demak had ties to Majapahit, China, Gresik, and Palembang.

== Foundations of the Demak Sultanate ==
According to Babad Tanah Jawi, Raden Patah refused to replace Arya Damar as Duke of Palembang. He fled to Java, accompanied by Raden Kusen. Arriving in Java, both of them studied at Sunan Ampel in Surabaya. Raden Kusen then served Majapahit, while Raden Patah moved to Central Java to open the Glagahwangi forest into a pesantren.

The longer the Glagahwangi pesantren was progressing. Brawijaya (aka Bhre Kertabhumi) in Majapahit was worried that Raden Patah intended to rebel. Raden Kusen, who at that time had been appointed Duke of Terung, was ordered to summon Raden Patah.

Duke of Terung confronts Raden Patah to Majapahit. Brawijaya (identified as Brawijaya V) was impressed and finally agreed to admit Raden Patah as his son. Raden Patah was appointed regent, while Glagahwangi was renamed Demak, with the capital being named Bintara.

According to Chinese chronicle of the Sam Poo Kong temple, Jin Bun moved from Surabaya to Demak in 1475. Then he conquered Semarang in 1477 as a subordinate of Demak. This made Kung-ta-bu-mi (aka Bhre Kertabhumi) in Majapahit uneasy. However, thanks to the persuasion of Bong Swi Hoo (aka Sunan Ampel), Kung-ta-bu-mi was willing to acknowledge Jin Bun as a son, and formalized his position as regent at Bing-to-lo (Chinese spelling for Bintoro).

== Demak and Majapahit conflicts during the Raden Patah period ==
The version of the War between Demak and Majapahit is reported in the babad and serat manuscripts, especially Babad Tanah Jawi and Serat Kanda. It is said that Sunan Ampel forbid Raden Patah to rebel against Majapahit because despite his different religions, Brawijaya was still Raden Patah's father. However, after the death of Sunan Ampel, Raden Patah continued to attack Majapahit. Brawijaya moksa in the attack. In order to neutralize the influence of the old religion, Sunan Giri occupied the Majapahit throne for 40 days.

The Chinese chronicle of the Sam Poo Kong temple also reports the war between Jin Bun and Kung-ta-bu-mi in 1478. The war took place after the death of Bong Swi Hoo (aka Sunan Ampel). Jin Bun stormed the capital of Majapahit. Bhre Kertabhumi was arrested and honorably transferred to Demak. Since then, Majapahit has been subordinate to Demak, led by a Chinese Muslim named Nyoo Lay Wa as the regent.

Prof.'s Dr. N. J. Krom in the book "Javaansche Geschiedenis" and Prof. Moh. Yamin in the book "Gajah Mada" said that it was not Demak who attacked Majapahit during the time of King Brawijaya V, but was King Girindrawardhana. Then after Girindrawardhana's attack on Majapahit in 1478 AD, Girindrawardhana then appointed himself king of Majapahit with the title of King Brawijaya VI, Girindrawardhana's power was not that long, because his Patih staged a coup and appointed himself as King Brawijaya VII. The war between Demak and Majapahit occurred during the reign of King Brawijaya VII, not during the time of Raden Fatah and Prabu Brawijaya V.

This Pa-bu-ta-la figure is identical to Prabu Natha Girindrawardhana aka Dyah Ranawijaya who published the Jiyu inscription in 1486 and claimed to be the ruler of Majapahit, Janggala and Kadiri.

In addition, Dyah Ranawijaya also issued a Petak inscription which tells the story of the war against Majapahit. This inscription gave birth to an opinion that Majapahit collapsed in 1478 not because of the attack from the Demak Sultanate, but because of the attack by the Girindrawardhana family.

== Administration ==
Whether Raden Patah ever attacked Majapahit or not, he is said to be the first king of the Sultanate of Demak. According to Babad Tanah Jawi, he has the title Senapati Jimbun Ningrat Ngabdurahman Panembahan Palembang Sayidin Panatagama, while according to Serat Pranitiradya, he has the title Sultan Syah Alam Akbar, and in Hikayat Banjar it is called Sultan Surya Alam.

The name Patah itself comes from the word al-Fatah, which means "The Opening", because he was indeed the opening of the first sultanate on the island of Java.

In 1479, Raden Patah inaugurated the Great Mosque of Demak as the center of government. He also introduced the use of the Salokantara as a royal statute book. Raden Patah was very tolerant of other faiths. The Sam Poo Kong Temple in Semarang was not forced back into a mosque, as it was when it was founded by the Muslim Admiral Cheng Ho.

Tome Pires in Suma Oriental reported that in 1507 Pate Rodin alias Raden Patah inaugurated the newly renovated Demak Grand Mosque. Then in 1512 his son-in-law, Pate Unus, the regent of Jepara, attacked the Portuguese in Malacca.

The Pate Unus character is synonymous with Yat Sun in the Chinese chronicle which is reported to have attacked foreigners in Moa-lok-sa in 1512. The difference is, Pate Unus is Pate Rodin's son-in-law, while Yat Sun is the son of Jin Bun. Both reports, both from Portuguese and Chinese sources, both mention that the fleet that Demak commanded was destroyed in this battle.

According to Chinese chronicles, Jin Bun aka Raden Patah died in 1518 at the age of 63. He was replaced by Yat Sun as the next king, who in Babad Tanah Jawi had the title Pangeran Sabrang Lor.

New title	Sultan of Demak; 1475-1518	Succeeded by Pati Unus
