= Ra Kuti uprising =

1319 Uprising in Java

Date	1319
Location	Trowulan
Result	Majapahit victory

Belligerents
Majapahit	Dharmaputra

Commanders and leaders
Jayanagara; Gajah Mada	Ra Kuti †; Singa Parapen †; Mahapati †

The Ra Kuti uprising was an failed uprising on Trowulan, the uprising was based on the disaffect of Jayanegara decision and also the family background of Jayanegara. This rebellion marked up as the deadliest uprising in the Majapahit because of Ra Kuti advance through Trowulan but ended up defeated by Gajah Mada’s forces.

== Background ==
During the reign of Jayanegara, the Dharmaputra hated Jayanagara rule, due to his terrible decisions and his family background, who not fully Javanese. His family roots were half Javanese and half Malayan,as his mother, Dara Petak, was a noble from Dharmasraya and was captured by Singhasari forces in the Pamalayu expedition.

The Dharmaputra, who were founded by Raden Wijaya, decided to rebel during the Jaya’s reign. One member, Ra Semi, rebelled as retaliation for the Majapahit attacks to Nambi. In the end, that rebellion was suppressed and Ra Semi was ended up killed by Majapahit forces.

== Uprisings ==
In this uprisings Ra Kuti gathered the Dharmaputra to support his action for capturing the throne Jayanegara, Ra Tanca and the others decided to supporting Ra Kuti action. In that years Gajah Mada still the one of companion commander from Bhayangkara (royal guard of Majapahit), also the attacks by Ra Kuti make Trowulan on berserk situation. In this moment Gajah Mada prove his crucial role for saving the throne of Majapahit.

The uprisings by Ra Kuti was considered as the biggest threat for Jayanegara, but Gajah Mada and his forces saving Jayanegara by retreated into Badander village (many of people still said the location of the village around Bojonegoro and Jombang). After the successful retreat Gajah Mada decided to go through Trowulan and making plans to secure Trowulan from Ra Kuti.

Gajah mada reassembled the officials of Majapahit in the house of regent of Amacanegara to creating the made up information about the death of Jayanegara on the retreat zone, many of civilians and officials was cried after hearing this information. By this action Gajah Mada found out that civilians still trusting Jayanegara reign and didn't liked the rebellion by Ra Kuti.

After the investigation by Gajah Mada, the Bhayangkara forces immediately attacked and killed Singa Parapen because his involvement for supporting Ra Kuti actions,following by Gajah Mada companies who marched through Trowulan the companies also killed Mahapati and destructed the Ra Kuti forces and also killed Ra Kuti itselfs .

== Aftermath ==
With the annihilation of Mahapati and his followers it also reflected the Bhayangkara fame under the Gajah Mada leadership, and after the destruction of Ra Kuti forces Jayanegara and his family are able for going to Trowulan. After the rebellion Jayanegara promoting Gajah Mada as governor of Kahuripan and two years later became governor of Daha because the death of previous Daha governor.
