= Gajah Mada inscription =

Ancient Indonesian inscription

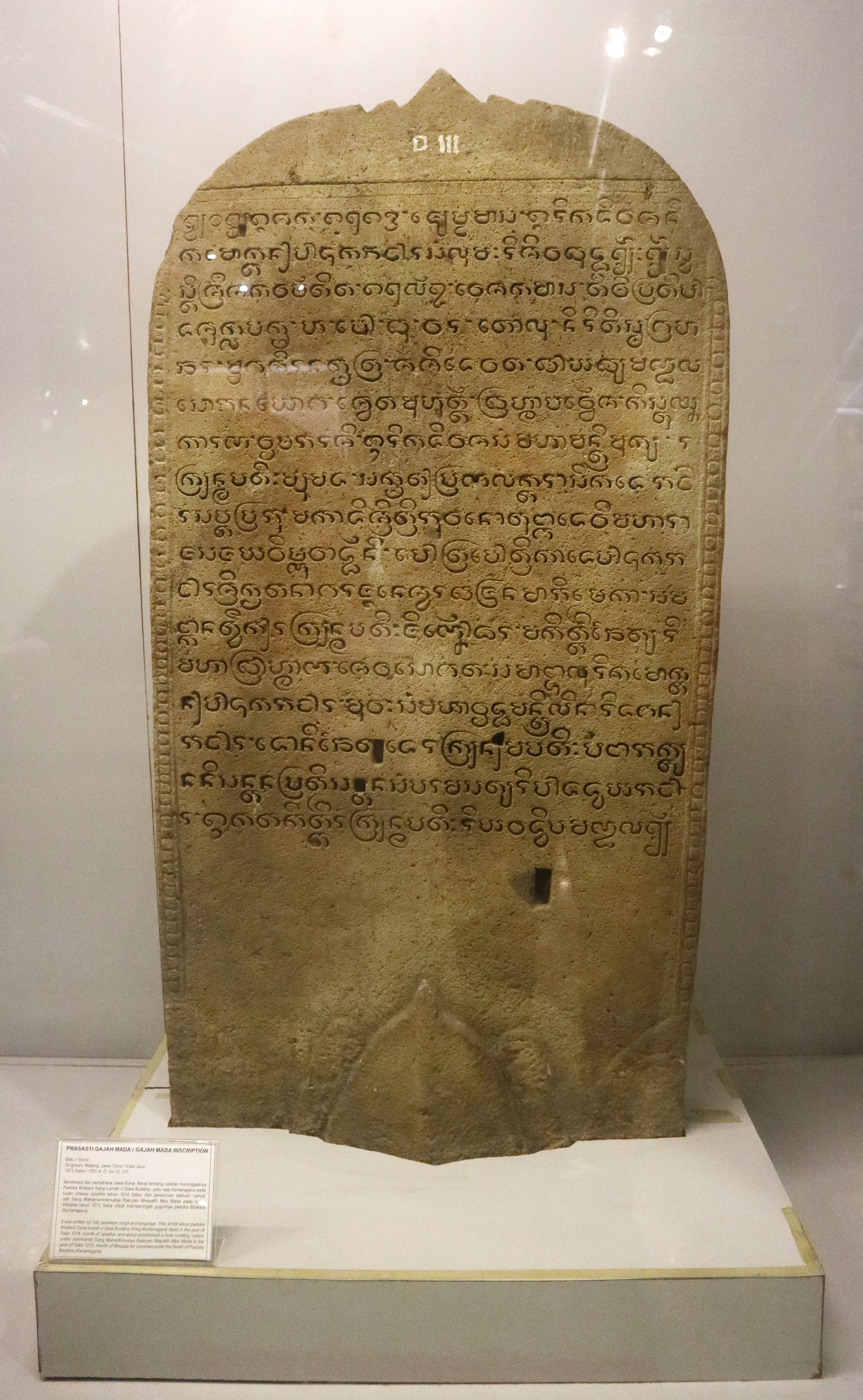
- Gajah Mada inscription, dated 1273 Saka (1351 CE), discovered in Singosari, Malang, East Java. Mentioned about a sacred caitya building dedicated by Gajah Mada for the late King Kertanegara of Singhasari.
- Material: Stone
- Created: 14th century
- Discovered: Singosari, Malang, East Java, Indonesia
- Present location: National Museum of Indonesia, Jakarta
- Registration: D 111

Gajah Mada inscription also known as Singhasari inscription, is an inscription written in old Javanese script, dated to 1273 Saka which corresponds to 1351 CE. This was in the period of the empire of Majapahit. The inscription was discovered in the Singosari district, Malang Regency, East Java. The inscription is now preserved in the National Museum of Indonesia in Jakarta under inventory number D 111. The inscription was carved on a smooth surface, and the letters are clearly legible.

This inscription is called the Gajah Mada inscription because it mentions Mpu Mada, the famed mahapatih (prime minister) of the 14th century Majapahit kingdom. The inscription states that the mahapatih himself commissioned this inscription — a political authority typically reserved only for monarchs. This indicates the importance of Gajah Mada's position within the kingdom, that he even had the right to issue his own inscriptions.

== Content ==
This inscription was written to commemorate the 1351 restoration of a funerary caitya temple dedicated to King Kertanegara of Singhasari who died in 1214 Saka or 1292 CE, carried out by Mahapatih Gajah Mada. The first half of this inscription provides a very detailed date, including the astronomical position of the celestial bodies (see Old Javanese calendar). The second half explains the purpose of this inscription, which is the construction of a caitya for the priests and Gajah Mada's predecessor, who perished when Kertanegara was killed by the king of Kediri. The temple mentioned in this inscription is most probably one of the buildings within the syncretic Shivaist-Buddhist Singhasari temple complex, the main building of which commemorates Kertanagara. This inscription was discovered near this temple.

== Transcription ==
1. / 0 / i śaka; 1214; jyeṣṭa māsa irika diwaśani
2. kamoktan pāduka bhaṭāra sang lumah ring śiwa buddha /’; /’ swa-
3. sti śri śaka warṣatita; 1273; weśakamāsa tithi pratipā-
4. # da śuklapakṣa; ha; po; bu; wara; tolu; niritistha graha-
5. cara; mṛgaśira nakṣatra; śaśidewata; bāyabyamaṇḍala;
6. sobhanayoga; śweta muhurtta; brahmāparwweśa; kistughna;
7. kāraṇa wṛṣabharaśi; ‘irika diwaśa sang mahāmantrimūkya; ra-
8. kryan mapatih mpu mada; sākṣat. praṇala kta rāsika de bhaṭā-
9. ra sapta prabhu; makādi śri tribhuwanotungga dewi mahārā
10. jasa jayawiṣṇuwārddhani; potra-potrikā de pāduka bha-
11. ṭāra śri kṛtanāgara jñaneśwara bajra nāmābhiṣaka sama-
12. ngkāna twĕk. rakryan mapatih jirṇnodhara; makirtti caitya ri
13. mahābrāhmāṇa; śewa sogata samāñjalu ri kamokta-
14. n pāduka bhaṭāra; muwah sang mahāwṛddha mantri linā ri dagan
15. bhaṭāra; doning caitya de rakryan. mapatih pangabhaktya-
16. nani santana pratisantana sang parama satya ri pāda dwaya bhaṭā-
17. ra; ika ta kirtti rakryan mapatih ri yawadwipa maṇḍala //’

Translation by Jessy Blom (adepted from a Dutch translation by Brandes):

In Śāka 1214 (1292 [CE]) in the month Jyesta, His Majesty, who is buried [better: enshrined] in the sanctuary in which Śiva and Buddha are worshipped with equal fervour, achieved redemption. Hail! Śaka-years passed by 1273 (1351 [CE]) in the month of Veśaka, on the first day of the crescent moon, on Haryang Pon Wednesday in the week Tolu, while the planet was in the southwest, and the moon in the lunar mansion Mṟgaśira was the ruling divinity, and in the mandala (astrologer's circle) the north-west came to be considered, in the yoga Sobhana, the hour Śveta, the kāraṉa Kistughna, under Brahmā, lord of the knot, and the sign of the zodiac, the Bull, then the principal high official, the Right Honourable Governor of the realm Mada, acting as intermediary for Their Majesties the seven [rulers], led by H.M. Tribhuwanotunggadewī Mahārāja Wisṉuwardhanī, (and of) the grandsons and granddaughters of H.M. Kṟtanagara (who is mentioned) with the consecration name Jñāneśwarabajra, at the said moment the patih, being the restorer of that which had fallen into ruin, founded a caitya for the great brahmans (rsis), the Śivaites and Buddhists, who followed the king in death, and also for the mahāmantri, who was slain at his feet in the same hour.

The R.H. Governor hopes in this way to have attained (his object) namely that the homage (due) (to their souls) will be rendered by the children and children's children of the faithful companions of the king. This is the foundation of the R.H. Governor of the real of Java's (sea-girt) circle.
