= Girindrawardhana =

Ruler of Daha, c. 1486

Dyah Ranawijaya ꦢꦾꦃꦬꦟꦮꦶꦗꦪ
- Girindrawardhana ꦓꦶꦬꦶꦟ꧀ꦢꦿꦮꦂꦝꦟ
- Reign: 1474–1498
- Predecessor: Kertabhumi
- Successor: Udara
- Born: Trowulan, Java
- Died: 1498; Daha, Java
- Father: Singhavikramavardhana
- Religion: Hinduism

Bhatara Prabhu Girindrawardhana Dyah Ranawijaya (abbreviated as Brawijaya) was the last King of Daha from 1486 until his death. He is referred in a Jiyu inscription as Sri Wilwatikta Jenggala Kediri, which means ruler of Majapahit, Janggala and Kediri, and as Pa Bu Ta La in Chinese literature. In modern historiography, he is believed to be the historical basis of Babad Tanah Jawi's legendary figure, Raden Alit/ Browijoyo. In Suma Oriental, he is mentioned as 'Batara Vojyaya', who is constantly at war with the ruler of Demak, 'Pate Rodim'

== Background ==
Ranawijaya was born in Trowulan (also called Wilwatikta) to King Singhawikramawardhana during a time of upheaval and decline across the Empire. In 1468 Prince Kertabhumi rebelled against King Singhawikramawardhana and captured Trowulan. The king moved to Daha, the former capital of Kadiri, where he died. Thus when Ranawijaya ascended the throne in 1474, the empire was divided.

== Early rule ==
For the first four years, Ranawijaya ruled from Daha in a climate of increasing conflict between Daha and Trowulan. This culminated in Perang Sudarma Wisuta, meaning the war between father and son, in 1478.

In 1478, Ranawijaya's army under Udara attacked the defences at Trowulan. Raden Patah of Demak sent reinforcements under Sunan Ngudung. According to Babad Tanah Jawi, Raden Patah was the son of Kertabhumi and a Chinese concubine. Sunan Ngudung died in the battle and was replaced by Sunan Kudus, but the army managed to turn back Ranawijaya's forces. However, they did not stop Udara's troops storming the palace and killing Kertabhumi.

== Later rule ==
With the death of Kertabhumi, Ranawijaya was now the undisputed ruler of Majapahit. He styled himself Girindrawardhana, the latter to show continuity with his predecessors back to Kritavijaya in 1447. In the Trailokyapuri Jiwu and Petak inscriptions, Girindrawardhana claims that he reunited Majapahit as one kingdom. In the Jiyu inscription, he is referred to as Sri Wilwatikta Jenggala Kediri, which means ruler of Majapahit, Janggala and Kediri in 1486. However, his power was substantially smaller than his predecessors. Raden Patah named himself the Sultan of Demak and ceased paying homage to the Brawijaya. From that time, the Demak Sultanate rose to become the dominant force in Java.

Demak continued to fight Girindrawardhana. As they claimed descent from Kertabumi, Raden Patah and his successor Pati Unus fought Girindrawardhana in retribution for his death.

Girindrawardhana
Preceded by Brawijaya V	Ruler of Majapahit; 1478–1489	Succeeded by Brawijaya VII
