= Sejarah Banten =

Javanese chronicle

Sejarah Banten ("History of Banten") is a Javanese chronicle containing stories of conversion to Islam in Indonesia. The manuscripts of the chronicle date from the late 19th century, although two are known to be copies written from the originals in the 1730s and 1740s.

Due to the scarcity and limitations of primary historical records, Sejarah Banten, is one of a number of accounts of Indonesian legends that scholars use to help illuminate aspects of the spread of Islam in Indonesia, the dominant religion in the Indonesian archipelago since the sixteenth century. Similar to the Babad Tanah Jawi ("History of the Land of Java"), Sejarah Banten, there are magical events, however, conversions are not specifically described nor is there emphasis on formal and tangible conversion rituals such as The Confession of Faith and circumcision.

== Story of Sunan Giri ==
According to the Sejarah Banten, a foreign holy man, Molana Usalam comes to Blambangan in the Eastern Salient of Java where Islam was not established until the eighteenth century. The daughter of Balambangan's ruler is critically ill, but recovers when Molana Usalam gives her betel nut to chew. She is given to Molana Usalam in marriage but Molana Usalam declines the offer when the princess refuses to adopt his religion of Islam. Moalana Usalam leaves the pregnant princess when he departs Balambangan. Her son is subsequently thrown into the sea in a chest, similar to the story of Moses as found in the Bible and sura XX of the Qur'an. The chest was pulled out of the sea at Gresik and the boy is raised as a Muslim. He becomes the first Sunan of Giri.

== See also ==
- History of Indonesia
- Babad Tanah Jawi
