= Gajah Mada =

14th-century political leader of the Majapahit Empire

Gajah Mada ꦓꦗꦃꦩꦢ Mahapatih
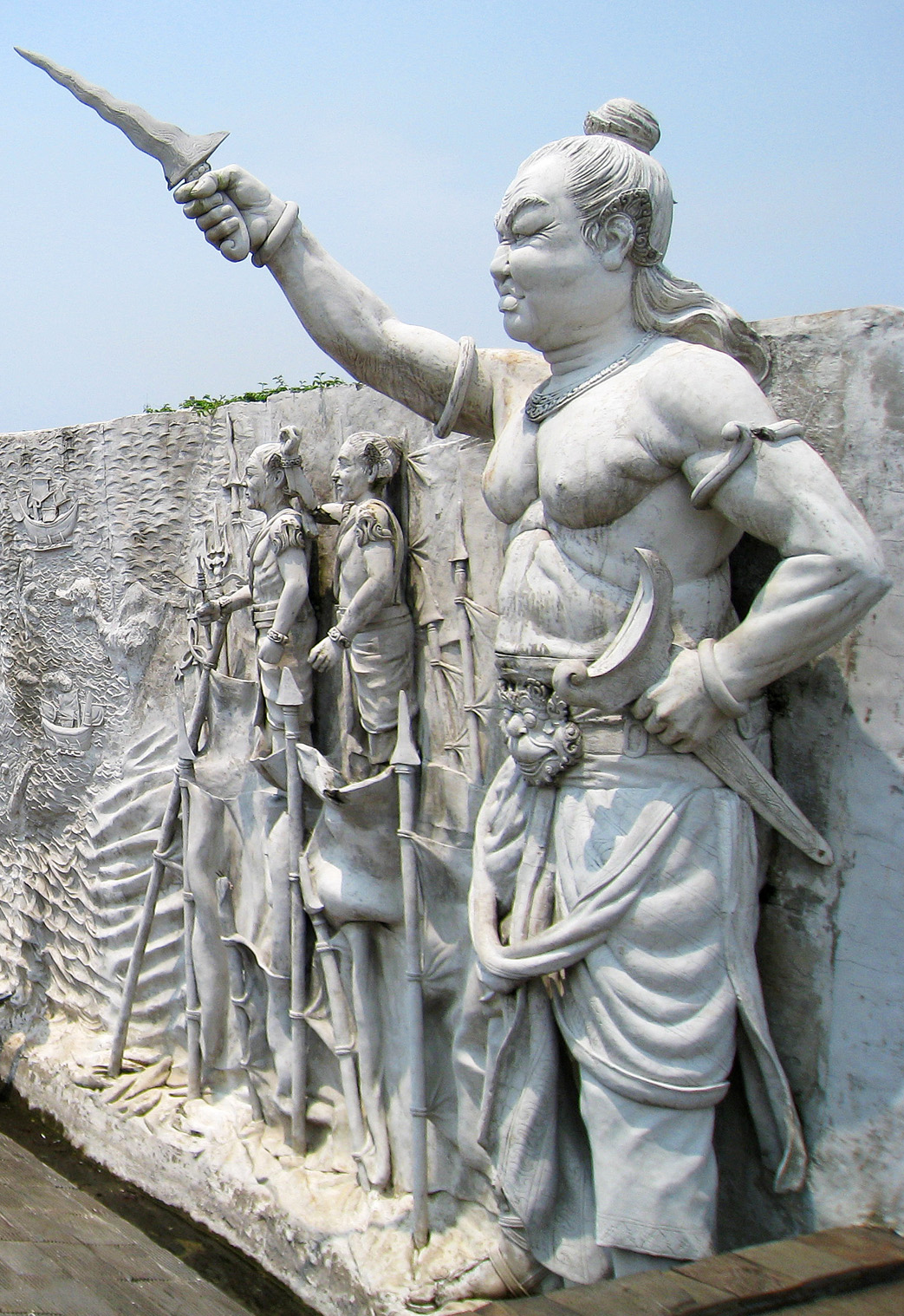
- A modern depiction of Gajah Mada in the National Monument

Mahapatih of the Majapahit Empire
- In office 1331 – c. 1364
- Monarchs: Tribhuwana Wijayatunggadewi; Hayam Wuruk

Personal details
- Born: c. 1290
- Died: c. 1364 (aged 74)
- Religion: Shaiva Hinduism (Note: The deification of Gajah Mada as Brajanata and Bhima indicated that he is Shiva devotee, but the religion of Majapahit itself is a mixture (syncretic) Hindu-Buddhist, also known as Shaiva-Buddhist.)

Military service
- Battles/wars: Sadeng Rebellion; Ra Kuti Rebellion; Bedahulu War; Battle of Brebes; Battle of Bubat; Padompo (Note: It is very possible that Gajah Mada still played a role in Majapahit after the Bubat incident. Munandar interpreted that he led the attack on Dompo with Admiral Wiramandalika Mpu Nala. The interpretation of Gajah Mada's role in Padompo can be seen in the literary collection of the Sultanate of Bima entitled Cerita Asal Bangsa Jin dan Segala Dewa-Dewa (The Origin Story of the Jinn and All the Devas), only that Gajah Mada's name is not mentioned directly but is likened to Bima. The description of the story has also been covered with various myths, legends, fairy tales, as well as contemporary historical events when the manuscript was first composed in the 17th and 19th centuries. See Munandar 2010, pp. 99–100.); Majapahit conquest of Pasai

Gajah Mada (Note: meaning Elephant General in Javanese language.) (c. 1290 – c. 1364, also known as Jirnnodhara) was a mahapatih (Note: In full Mahapatih Hamengkubumi, equivalent to the position of prime minister.) and prominent general of the Javanese Majapahit Empire. He is known for unifying the Nusantara archipelago, bringing the empire to its peak of glory. According to legend, he even went as far as delivering an oath called Sumpah Palapa, in which he vowed not to rest until he had accomplished his goal of unification. His accomplishments had been heavily credited in Old Javanese manuscripts, poems and inscriptions.

During his reign, the Hindu epics, including the Rāmāyana and the Mahābhārata, became ingrained in the Javanese culture and worldview through the performing arts of wayang kulit (“leather puppets”). He is considered an important national hero in modern Indonesia, as well as a symbol of patriotism and national unity. Historical accounts of his life, political career, and administration are taken from several sources, mainly the Pararaton ("The Book of Kings"), the Nagarakretagama (a Javanese-language eulogy), and an inscription dating from the mid-14th century.

== Depiction ==
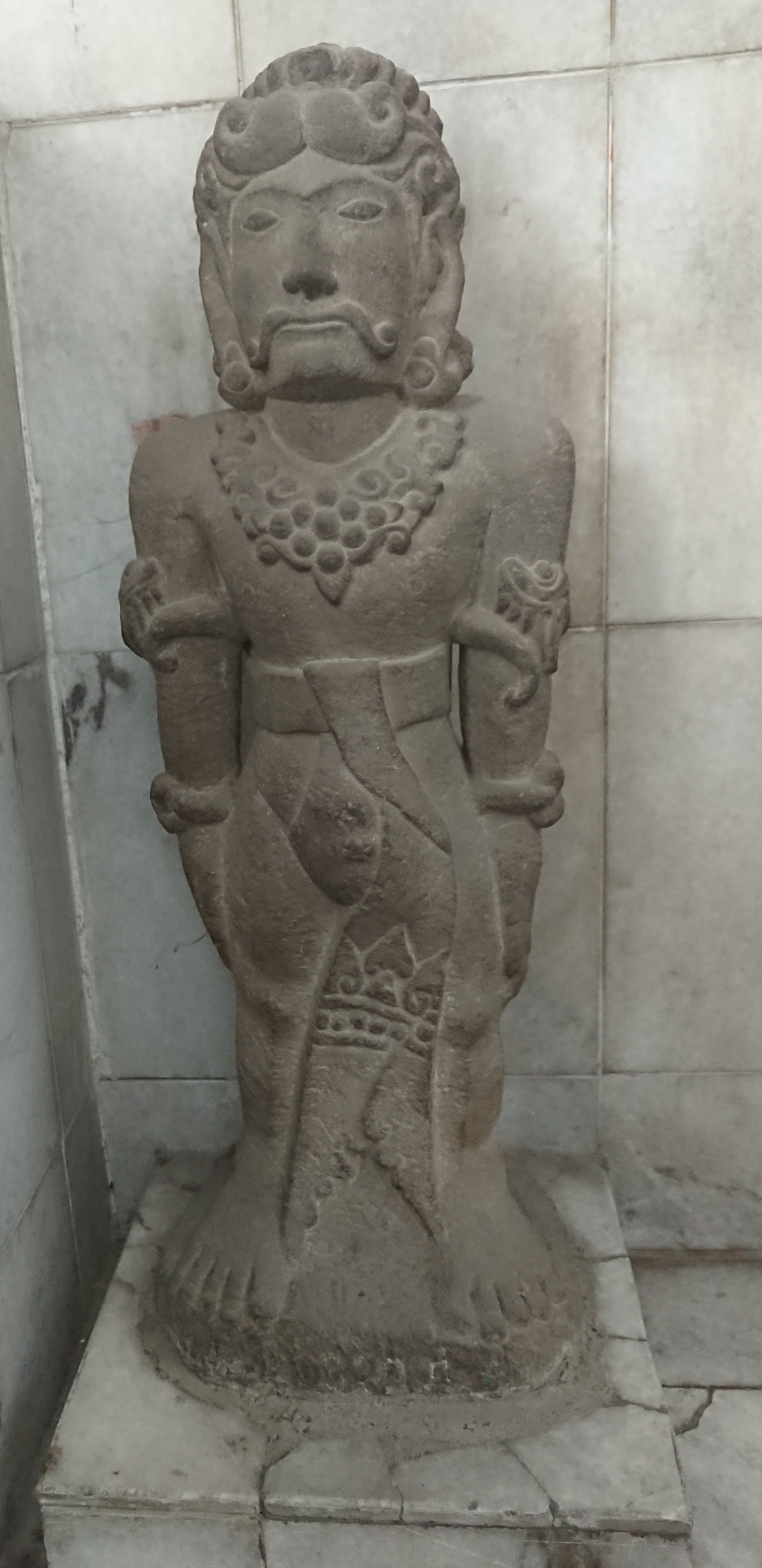
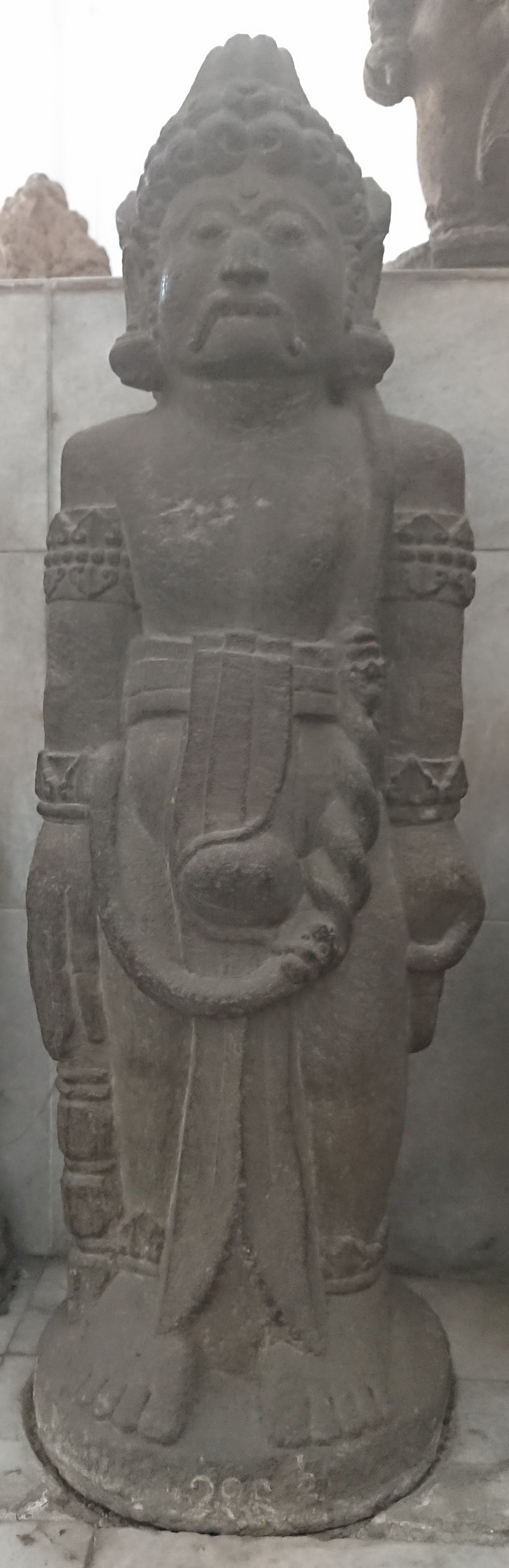
The depiction of Gajah Mada as statues, left to right:
- Brajanata statue, at the National Museum of Indonesia, No. 5136/310d
- Bima statue, No. 2776/286b

Much of the modern popular depiction of Gajah Mada derives from the imagination of Mohammad Yamin in his 1945 book Gajah Mada: Pahlawan Persatuan Nusantara. One day in the 1940s, Yamin visited Trowulan, the site of the capital city of the former Majapahit kingdom. He found fragments of terracotta, one of which was a piggy bank in the form of the face of a man with a stocky face and curly hair. Based on the look on the piggy bank's face, Yamin interpreted this as the face of Gajah Mada, the unifier of the archipelago. Yamin then asked the artist Henk Ngantung to make a painting based on the terracotta fragment. The painting was displayed as the cover of Yamin's book. Many people disagree with Yamin's opinion because it is impossible for the face of a figure as big as Gajah Mada to be displayed in a piggy bank. Such a portrayal is considered an insult because usually the state leaders during the Hindu-Buddhist era, including Majapahit, were made in effigy as statues. Some even believe that the face was none other than Yamin's own face.

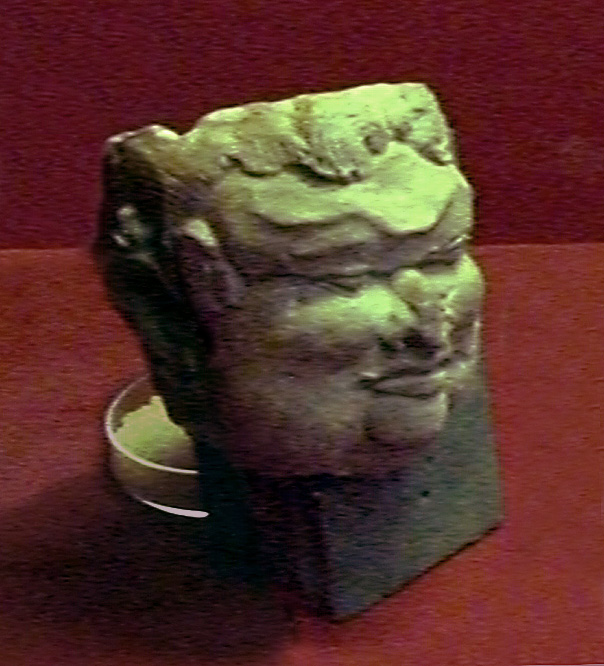
Majapahit Terracotta from archaeological findings at Trowulan Site, now a collection of Majapahit Museum, Mojokerto, East Java.

Another illustration of the historical Gajah Mada, different from Yamin's, is the result of research at the University of Indonesia by archaeologist Agus Aris Munandar. He interpreted that Gajah Mada was depicted as Bima in wayang shadow-puppet shows, with a transverse mustache. In popular depiction, Gajah Mada is mostly shown bare-chested, wearing a sarong, and using a weapon in the form of a kris. While this may have been true on civilian duties, his official outfit might have been different: a Sundanese patih explained in the kidung Sundayana that Gajah Mada wore a gold-embossed karambalangan (breastplate) and was armed with a gold-layered spear and a shield full of diamond decoration.

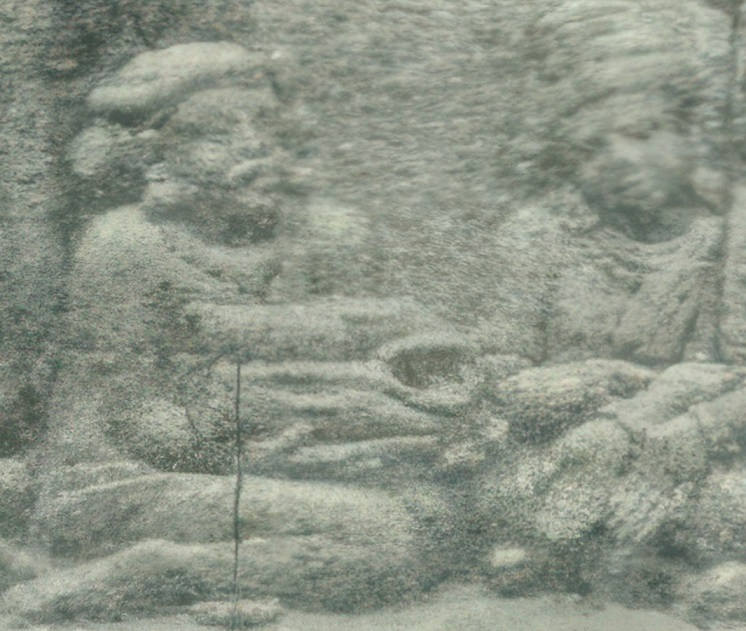
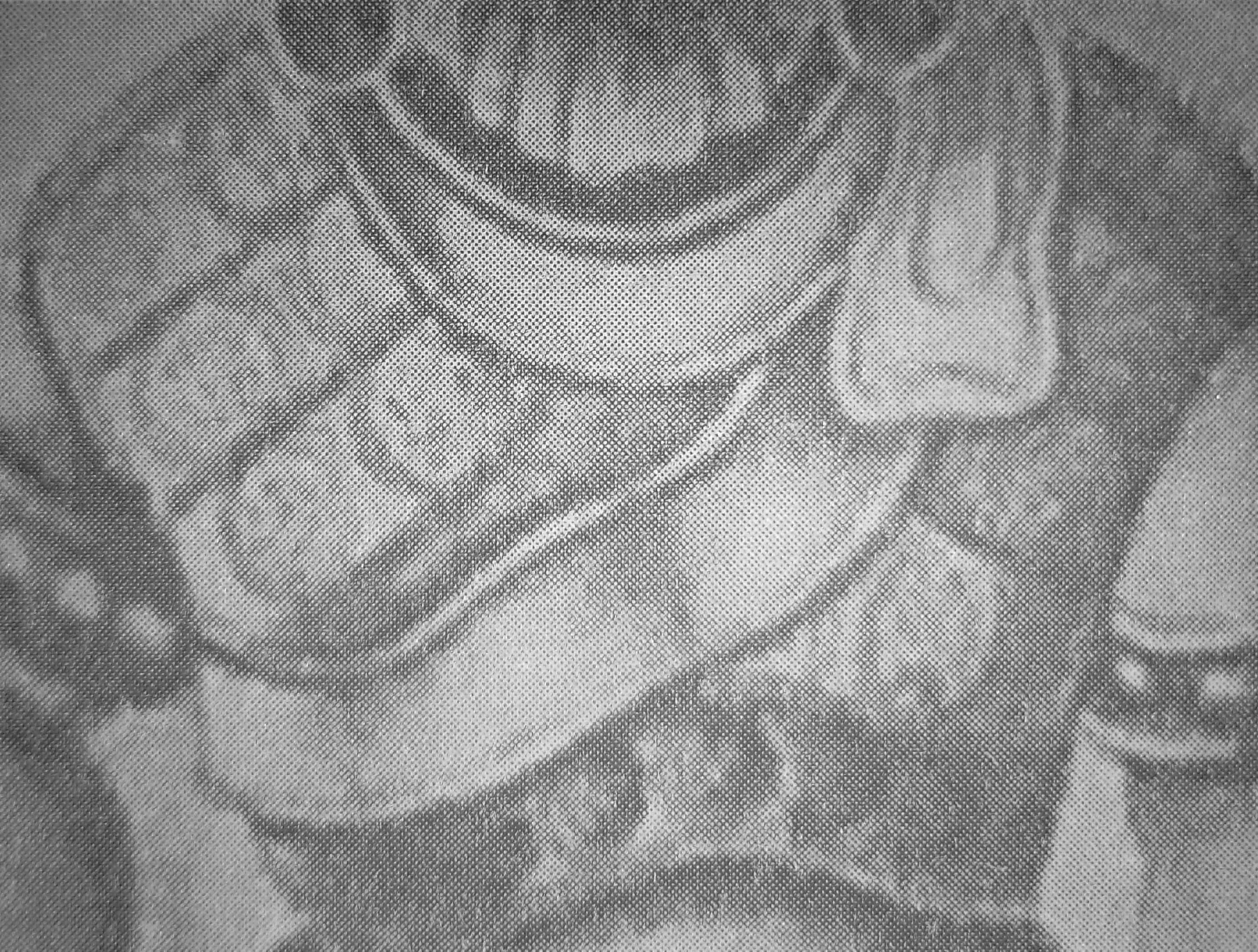
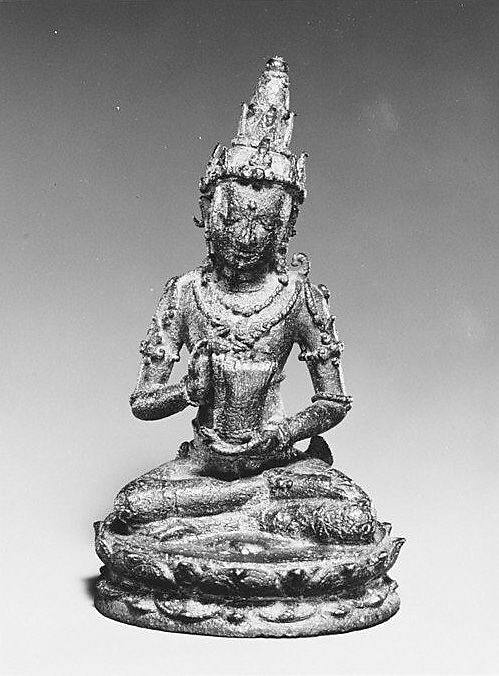
The armor that may be used by Gajah Mada, left to right:
- A cuirass being presented by a brahmin, depicted in the Borobudur temple.
- War attire or armor depicted in a statue from a candi in Singasari
- Cuirass being held by a deity, from earlier, 10–11th century Nganjuk, East Java

According to Munandar, at first Gajah Mada was depicted as a Brajanata character from the Panji tales, and as Bima from the Mahābhārata in later eras. The Panji story was known earlier than the activities of making Bima statues, which apparently began in the mid-15th century, so the former was likely Gajah Mada's original depiction. The glorification of Gajah Mada in the first stage is profane—in the form of its depiction as Brajanata, but then the glorification of Gajah Mada occurs in the second stage which is more sacred, which is equated with Bima as an aspect of Siva. In the statue found at the National Museum of Indonesia (No. 5136/310d), the statue is depicted with a sturdy body, transverse mustache, and wavy curls, at the top of the head there is a hair tie with a ribbon forming like a tekes hat. He wears clothes and jewelry, bracelets, and an upper armband in the form of a snake-like Bima's.

The traditional Bima statue depiction associated with Gajah Mada was made at the end of Majapahit in the mid-15th century. The characteristics are: a) wearing a supit urang crown (his hair is shaped in two arches at the top of the head like a shrimp tongs), b) a transverse mustache, c) strong body, d) wearing poleng (black and white) cloth, and e) the phallus is always depicted standing out. In the Bima statue stored in the National Museum (No. 2776/286b), he is depicted standing upright with both hands beside his body, his right hand holding a gadha (a kind of mace); his phallus is depicted as protruding with a shawl hanging between his legs; he is wearing a serpent upavita, a crown of supit urang, a grim face, and a thick transverse mustache; and the hair above the forehead is described as curly, forming a jamang (forehead decoration). The similarity between the statue of Brajanata as the embodiment of Gajah Mada and the statue of Bima is not a coincidence, but there is an underlying conception that is developed along with the distance between historical events and their worshippers at a later time.

== Meaning of name ==
The word "Gajah" (elephant) refers to a large animal that is respected by other animals. In Hindu mythology it is believed to be a vahana (animal mount) of the god Indra. Elephants are also associated with Ganesha, the elephant-headed god with a human body, the son of Shiva and Parvati. As for the word "Mada", in the ancient Javanese language (possibly derived from Sanskrit, where the word has the same meaning), it means "drunk". When an elephant is drunk, he will walk arbitrarily and violently, overcoming all obstacles. So when it is associated with the figure of Gajah Mada, the name can be interpreted in two ways, namely:

1. He considered himself to be the vehicle of the king, the executor of the king's orders, just as the elephant Airavata became the vahana of the god Indra.
2. He is a person who seems drunk and violent when faced with various obstacles that will hinder the progress of the kingdom. It really is the right choice of name and it seems that the name has been carefully thought out, its meaning having been previously used for his name.

In the Gajah Mada inscription, another nickname was used, namely Rakryan Mapatih Jirnnodhara. It is possible the name is just a title for Gajah Mada, but it can also be seen as the official name. The meaning of the word Jirnnodhara is "builder of something new" or "restorer of something that has fallen apart". In a literal sense, Gajah Mada is the builder of caitya for Kertanegara, which did not exist before. In a figurative sense, he can be seen as a restorer and successor to Kertanegara's ideas in the Dwipantara Mandala concept.

== Rise to power ==
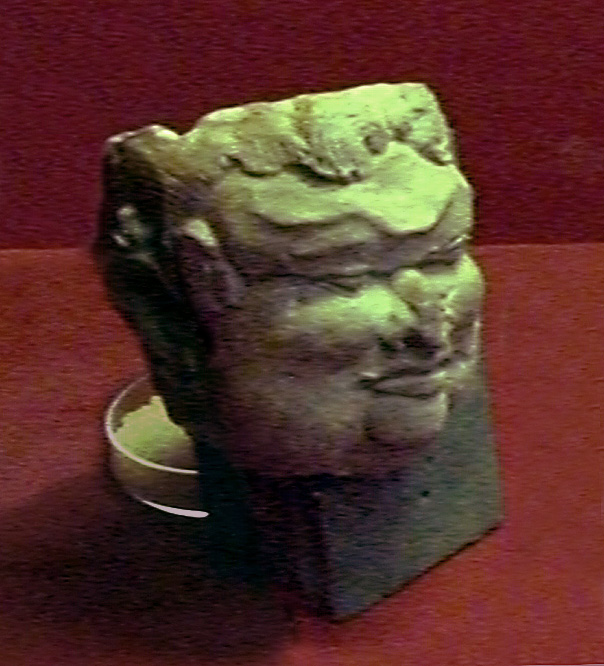
The terracotta figure collection of Trowulan Museum. Mohammad Yamin used this clay image as a popular depiction of Gajah Mada.

Not much is known about Gajah Mada's early life, but he was born into an ordinary family. Early accounts mention his career as a commander of the Bhayangkara, an elite royal guard for the Majapahit king and royal family.

When Rakrian Kuti, an official from Majapahit, rebelled against King Jayanegara (r. 1309–1328) in 1321, Gajah Mada and the mahapatih Arya Tadah rescued the king and his family by escaping from the capital city of Trowulan. Later Gajah Mada helped the king return to the capital and crush the rebellion. Seven years later, Jayanegara was murdered by the court physician Rakrian Tanca, an aide of Rakrian Kuti.

Another version suggests that Jayanegara was assassinated by Gajah Mada in 1328. Jayanegara was overly protective of his two half-sisters, born from Kertarajasa's youngest queen, Dyah Dewi Gayatri. Complaints by the two young princesses led to the intervention of Gajah Mada. His solution was to arrange for a surgeon to murder the king while pretending to perform surgery.

Jayanegara was immediately succeeded by his half-sister Tribhuwana Wijayatunggadewi (r. 1328–1350). However, when she took the throne, the Sadeng and Keta region did not send their delegations, which was interpreted as a rebellion. This was later confirmed when Tribhuwana's spies discovered that both regions were preparing for rebellions. Sadeng and Keta were coastal regions who were formerly conquered by Majapahit. However, the death of Nambi in 1316 (a local patih who was deemed instrumental in raising both regions) also contributed to the rebellion. At this time Sadeng was also led by a famed Majapahit general, Wirota Wiraganti.

While Gajah Mada was still currently a patih, he was sent by Tribhuwana with the advice of the sickly mahapatih Arya Tadah, to negotiate with rebel leaders in 1331. However, the Majapahit general Ra Kembar, a rival of Gajah Mada, preceded his arrival with his army to crush both rebellions. His men Jabung Tarewes, Lembu Peteng, dan Ikal-Ikalan Bang were also the ones implicated in the murder of Nambi.

This led to a conflict between Gajah Mada's and Ra Kembar's forces which was only resolved when Tribhuwana herself led the battles against both rebelling regions. After Arya Tadah's retirement, Gajah Mada was picked as mahapatih in 1334. It was during Gajah Mada's reign as mahapatih, around the year 1345, that the famous Muslim traveller Ibn Battuta visited Sumatra.

== Palapa oath and empire expansion ==
The expansion of the Majapahit empire in the 14th century owed much to Gajah Mada.

It is said that it was during his appointment as mahapatih under queen Tribhuwanatunggadewi that Gajah Mada took his famous oath, the Palapa Oath or Sumpah Palapa. The telling of the oath is described in the Pararaton (Book of Kings), an account of Javanese history that dates from the 15th or 16th century:

Sira Gajah Madapatih amangkubhumi tan ayun amuktia palapa, sira Gajah Mada: "Lamun huwus kalah nusantara isun amukti palapa, lamun kalah ring Gurun, ring Seran, Tañjungpura, ring Haru, ring Pahang, Dompo, ring Bali, Sunda, Palembang, Tumasik, samana isun amukti palapa".

Translation:

[Eventually] Gajah Mada became patih mangkubumi, [but] did not want to amukti palapa. Gajah Mada [swore], "If I have conquered the Nusantara Archipelago, [then] I will amukti palapa. If [I have] conquered Gurun, Seram, Tanjungpura, Haru, Pahang, Dompo, Bali, Sunda, Palembang, Tumasik (Singapore), then I will amukti palapa."

Petrus Josephus Zoetmulder defines amukti palapa as "enjoying a state where everything can be taken", or simply "enjoying pleasure"; while according to Slamet Muljana it means "enjoying rest".

Even his closest friends were at first doubtful of his oath, but Gajah Mada kept pursuing his dream to unify Nusantara under the glory of Majapahit. Soon he conquered the surrounding territory of Bedahulu (Bali) and Lombok (1343). He then sent the navy westward to attack the remnants of the thalassocratic kingdom of Sriwijaya in Palembang. There he installed Adityawarman, a Majapahit prince, as vassal ruler of the Minangkabau in West Sumatra.

He then conquered the first Islamic sultanate in Southeast Asia, Samudra Pasai, and another state in Svarnadvipa (Sumatra). Gajah Mada also conquered Bintan, Tumasik (Singapore), Melayu (now known as Jambi), and Kalimantan.

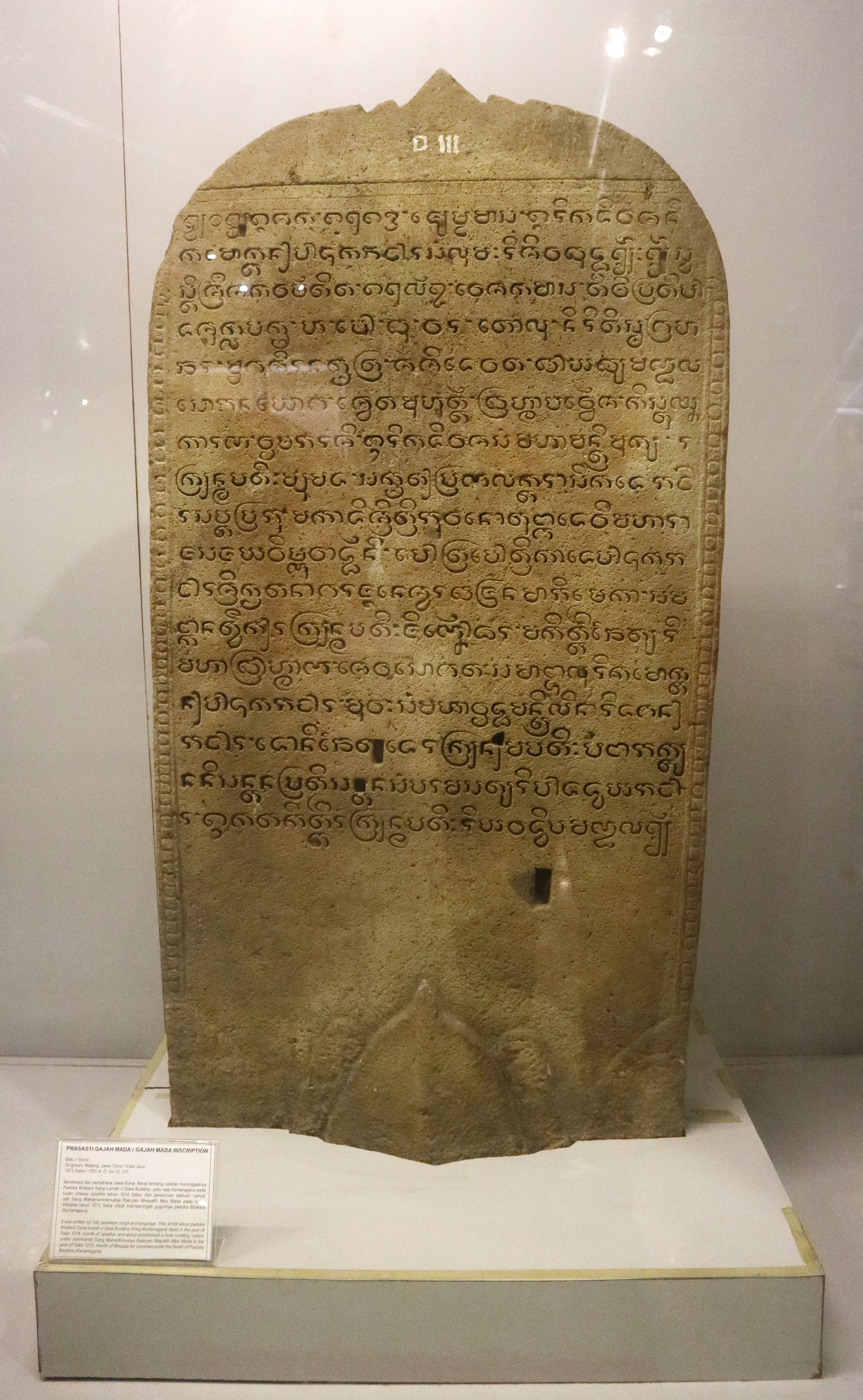
The Gajah Mada inscription, dated 1273 Saka (1351 CE), mentions a sacred caitya building dedicated by Gajah Mada for the late King Kertanegara of Singhasari.

At the resignation of queen Tribuwanatunggadewi, her son, Hayam Wuruk (ruled 1350–1389), became king. Gajah Mada retained his position as mahapatih under the new king and continued his military campaign by expanding eastward into Logajah, Gurun, Seram, Hutankadali, Sasak, Buton, Banggai, Kunir, Galiyan, Salayar, Sumba, Muar (Saparua), Solor, Bima, Wandan (Banda), Ambon, Timor, and Dompo.

He thus effectively brought the modern Indonesian archipelago under Majapahit control, which spanned not only the territory of today's Indonesia but also that of Temasek (the historical name for Singapore), and the states comprising modern-day Malaysia, Brunei, the southern Philippines and East Timor.

According to the Gajah Mada inscription, dated 1273 Saka (1351 CE), in the month of Wesakha, Sang Mahamantrimukya Rakryan Mapatih Mpu Mada (Gajah Mada) commanded, created and inaugurated a sacred building of Caitya, dedicated for the late Paduka Bhatara Sang Lumah ri Siwa Buddha (King Kertanegara) who had died in 1214 Saka (1292 CE) in the month of Jyesta. The inscription was discovered in Singosari subdistrict, Malang, East Java, and was written in Old Javanese script and language. The caitya or temple mentioned in this inscription is possibly Singhasari temple. The special reverence to King Kertanegara of Singhasari demonstrated by Gajah Mada suggests that the mahapatih honoured the late king tremendously, and possibly the two are related. Some historian suggests that possibly Kertanegara was Gajah Mada's grandfather.

== Bubat Incident ==
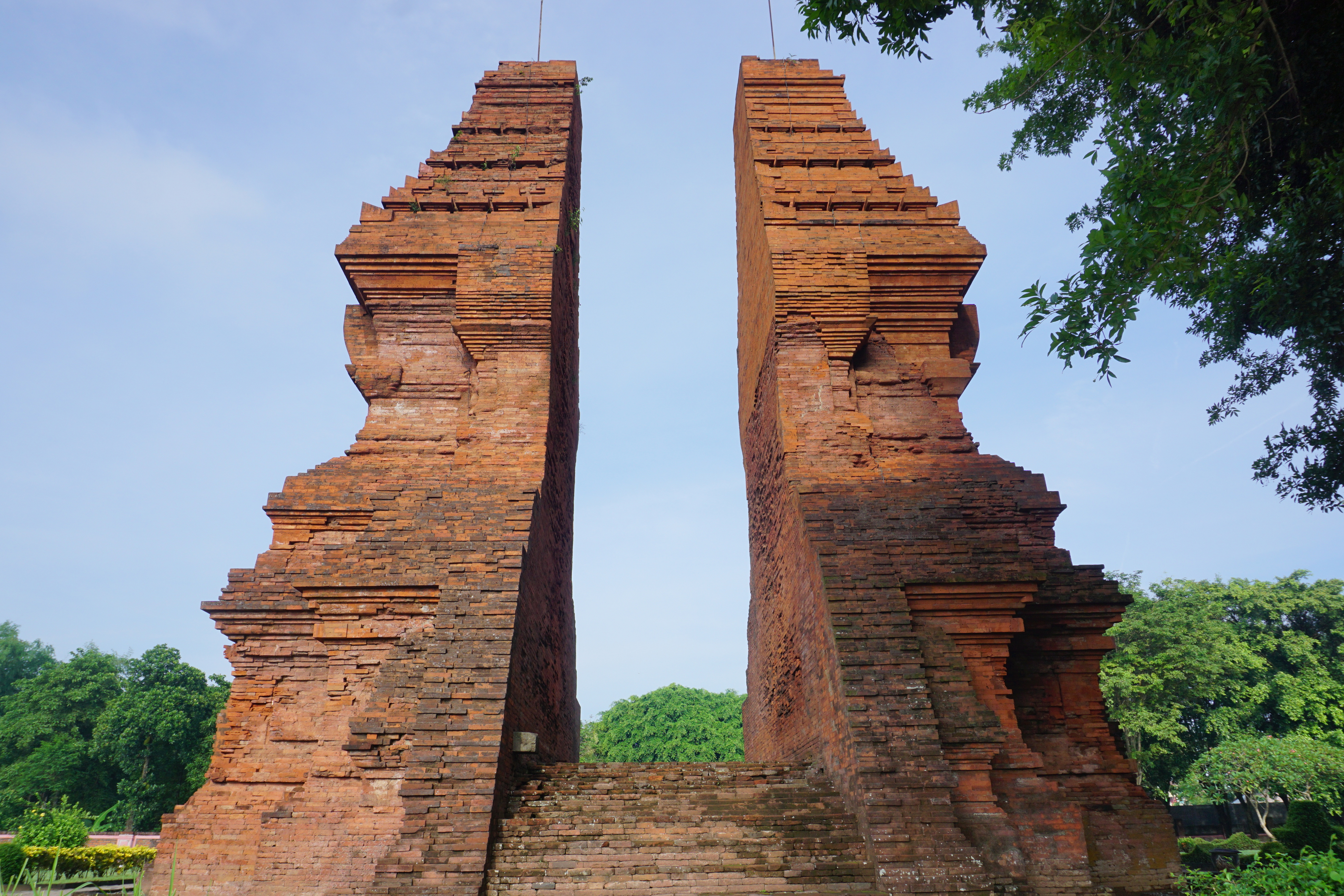
According to Nagarakretagama, Bubat square is located in the northern parts of the Majapahit capital city. The residence of Mahapatih Gajah Mada was also located in the northern part of the city, and tradition has linked this gate with Gajah Mada's residence.

In 1357, the only remaining state refusing to acknowledge Majapahit's hegemony was Sunda, in West Java, bordering the Majapahit Empire. King Hayam Wuruk intended to marry Dyah Pitaloka Citraresmi, a princess of Sunda and the daughter of Sunda's king. Gajah Mada was given the task to go to the Bubat square in the northern part of Trowulan to welcome the princess as she arrived with her father and escort to Majapahit palace.

Gajah Mada took this opportunity to demand Sunda submission to Majapahit rule. While the Sunda King thought that the royal marriage was a sign of a new alliance between Sunda and Majapahit, Gajah Mada thought otherwise. He stated that the Princess of Sunda was not to be hailed as the new queen consort of Majapahit, but merely as a concubine, as a sign of submission of Sunda to Majapahit. This misunderstanding led to embarrassment and hostility, which quickly rose into a skirmish and then the full-scale Battle of Bubat. The Sunda King with all of his guards as well as the royal party were overwhelmed by Majapahit troops and subsequently killed in the field of Bubat. Tradition holds that the heartbroken princess, Dyah Pitaloka Citraresmi, committed suicide.

Hayam Wuruk was deeply shocked by the tragedy. Majapahit courtiers, ministers and nobles blamed Gajah Mada for his recklessness, and the brutal consequences were not to the taste of the Majapahit royal family. Gajah Mada was promptly demoted and spent the rest of his days at the estate of Madakaripura in Probolinggo in East Java.

== Death ==
Gajah Mada died in obscurity in 1364, at the age of 74. King Hayam Wuruk considered the power Gajah Mada had accumulated during his time as mahapatih too much to handle for a single person. Therefore, the king split the responsibilities that had been Gajah Mada's, between four separate new mahamantri (equal to ministries), thereby probably increasing his own power. King Hayam Wuruk, who is said to have been a wise leader, was able to maintain the hegemony of Majapahit in the region that was gained during Gajah Mada's service. However, Majapahit slowly fell into decline after the death of Hayam Wuruk.

== Legacy ==
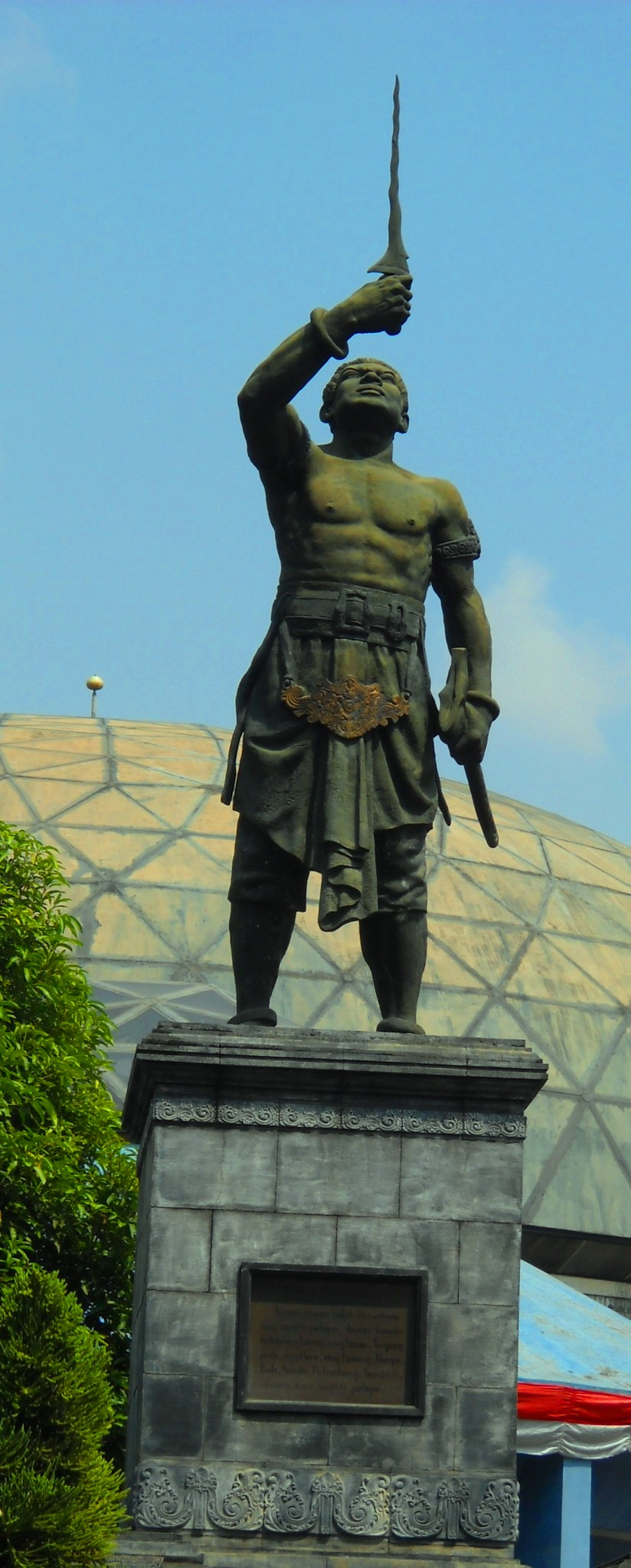
Gajah Mada statue in front of the now-demolished Telecommunication Museum in Taman Mini Indonesia Indah, Jakarta. Palapa, Indonesia's first telecommunication satellite, was named after Palapa oath.

His reign helped further Indianisation of Javanese culture through the spread of Hinduism and sanskritization.

The Blahbatuh royal house in Gianyar, Bali, has been performing Gajah Mada's mask dance drama ritually for the past 600 years. The mask of Gajah Mada has been protected and brought to life every couple of years to unite and harmonize the world, this sacred ritual was intended to bring peace to Bali.

Gajah Mada's legacy is important for Indonesian Nationalism, and invoked by the Indonesian Nationalist movement in the early 20th century. The Nationalists prior to the Japanese invasion, notably Sukarno and Mohammad Yamin, often cited Gajah Mada's oath and Nagarakretagama as the inspiration and a historical proof of Indonesian past greatness — that Indonesians could unite, despite vast territory and various cultures. The Gajah Mada campaign that united the far flung islands within the Indonesian archipelago under Majapahit suzerainty, was used by Indonesian nationalists to argue that an ancient form of unity had existed prior to Dutch colonialism. Thus, Gajah Mada was a great inspiration during the Indonesian National Revolution for independence from Dutch colonization.

In 1942, only 230 Indonesian natives held a tertiary education. The Republicans sought to mend the Dutch apathy and established the first state university, which freely admitted native pribumi Indonesians. Universitas Gadjah Mada, in Yogyakarta is named in honour of Gajah Mada and was completed in 1945, and had the honour of being the first Medicine Faculty freely open to natives.

Launched on 9 July 1976, Indonesia's first telecommunication satellite was called Satelit Palapa signifying its role in uniting the vast archipelagic nation.

The Army Military Police Corps of the Indonesian Army has honored Gajah Mada as their unit symbol. The symbol of the Army MP corps also has the picture of Gajah Mada. After modernization of the Italian aircraft carrier Giuseppe Garibaldi and transfer to the Indonesian Navy, she was renamed KRI Gajah Mada.

Many cities in Indonesia have streets named after Gajah Mada, such as Jalan Gajah Mada and Jalan Hayam Wuruk. There is a brand of badminton shuttlecock named after him as well.

== In popular culture ==
In games

- Gajah Mada was featured as a character in the visual novel Cannonball ~Neko Neko Machine Mou Race!~, and the character is based on a real historical person.
- Gajah Mada appears as an NPC quest giver in the MMORPG Atlantica Online, where he leads the military during the Majapahit Empire questline and tasks players with stopping the Rakrian Kuti rebellion to protect King Jayanegara.
- Gajah Mada appeared in the expansion pack Brave New World for the PC video game Sid Meier's Civilization V as the leader of the Indonesian civilization.
- Gajah Mada is featured in the video game Europa Universalis IV expansion pack, Leviathan. Through the Gajah Mada's Oath mission, which unlocks a unique conquest casus belli based on the Palapa oath, allowing players to subjugate neighboring nations and unify the region under Majapahit.
- Gajah Mada has a campaign for the Malay civilization in the Age of Empires II expansion pack, Rise of the Rajas. The campaign revolves around the establishment of the Majapahit Empire with the Mongol invasion, the conquest of the archipelago after the Palapa oath and the Bubat Tragedy that led to his downfall.
- Gajah Mada appeared as a playable commander in the mobile game Rise of Kingdoms, obtainable upon reaching the Season of Conquest campaign.
- Gajah Mada is featured as a key historical figure in the strategy board game Buru by Crafty Games, where players act as nobles sent by King Hayam Wuruk and Gajah Mada to explore and build influence on the Buru island during the Majapahit era.
- Gajah Mada is featured in the MMORPG Uncharted Waters Origin within the Writing the Chronicles quest line set in Southeast Asia.

In anime

- Gajah Mada is mentioned as Prime Minister of the Majapahit Empire in the anime Joukamachi no Dandelion in episode 10.

== See also ==
- Gajah Mada inscription
- Negarakertagama
- Kejawèn
- Kidung Sunda
- Gadjah Mada University
- Jalan Gajah Mada and Jalan Hayam Wuruk
- Agama Hindu Dharma
- Hinduism in Indonesia
- Hinduism in Southeast Asia

== Sources ==
- Munandar, Agus Aris (2010). Gajah Mada: Biografi Politik. Jakarta: Komunitas Bambu. ISBN 978-979-3731-72-8.
- Pigeaud, Theodoor Gautier Thomas (1960). Java in the 14th Century: A Study in Cultural History : The Nāgara-Kĕrtāgama by Rakawi Prapañca of Majapahit, 1365 A.D., Volume III: Translations (3rd revised ed.). The Hague: Martinus Nijhoff. ISBN 978-94-011-8772-5.
- Yamin, Muhammad (1945). Gadjah Mada, Pahlawan Persatoean Noesantara. Balai Poestaka. ISBN 9794073237.
