= Pati Unus =

Sultan of Demak (1518–1521)

Pati Unus aka Yat Sun (Javanese: ꦥꦠꦶꦪꦸꦤꦸꦱ꧀, Chinese: 逸新, Pinyin: Yat Sun) known as Pangeran Sabrang Lor (1488–1521) was the second Sultan of Demak who reigned from 1518 to 1521. Pati Unus' real name is Raden Abdul Qadir. He is the crown prince of Raden Patah, the founder of Demak.

According to Tome Pires in 1513, Pati Unus was 25 years old and had finished invading Malacca in the first attack. In 1521, Pati Unus led a second invasion of Malacca against the Portuguese occupation. However, he was killed in battle and was succeeded by his sister-in-law, Trenggana as the next king of Demak.

== Origin ==
In the Suma Oriental, Tomé Pires mentions a man named "Pate Onus" or "Pate Unus". He was the brother-in-law of Pate Rodim, the ruler of Demak. Pate Rodim is a figure who is synonymous with Raden Patah, the founder and first king of Demak.

In the Hikayat Banjar, the king of Demak Sultan Surya Alam helped Pangeran Samudera, the ruler of Banjarmasin to defeat his uncle the ruler of the Kingdom of Negara Daha in the interior of South Kalimantan.

A son of Raden Patah named Raden Surya is also known as Pangeran Sabrang Lor (sabrang means crossing and lor means north), because he crossed the Java Sea to Malacca to fight the Portuguese.

The statement of the figure of Pati Unus clashes with the figure of Trenggana, the third king of Demak, who reigned from 1505 to 1518, then from 1521 to 1546.

== Invasions of Malacca ==
=== First invasion ===
In 1512, Samudra Pasai fell to the Portuguese, this made Pati Unus' task as Commander of the Islamic Fleet of Java even more urgent, and had to be carried out immediately. So at the end of 1512 a fleet, in the expedition of jihad was sent to invade the Portuguese fort in Malacca. In January 1513, Pati Unus' fleet reached Malacca, carrying about 100 ships with 5,000 Javanese soldiers from Jepara and Palembang. About 30 of them are large Javanese junks weighing 350-600 tons (with the exception of the main ship Pati Unus), the rest are smooth-knit, exploring, and graduation type ships. The junks alone carried 12,000 people. The ships carried a lot of artillery made in Java. Although defeated, Pati Unus sailed home and buried his warship as a monument to the struggle. This won him the throne of Demak. In a letter to Afonso de Albuquerque, from Cannanore, 22 February 1513, Fernão Pires de Andrade, Captain of the fleet that repelled Pate Unus, said:

Pati Unus's junk is the largest seen by the people of this area. He had a thousand soldiers on board, and His Majesty can trust me... that it was a very remarkable thing to see, because the nearby Anunciada didn't look like a ship at all. We attacked it with bombardment, but even the greatest shot did not penetrate it below the waterline, and the esfera (fire) I had on board I managed to get in but did not penetrate; The ship had three layers of metal, all of which were more than one cruzado thick. And that ship is really so terrible that no one has ever even seen the like. It took three years to build, His Majesty may have heard the story in Malacca about Pati Unus, who made this fleet to become the king of Malacca.

=== Second invasion ===
In 1521, all 375 ships had been completed. Despite serving as sultan for only three years, Pati Unus decided to directly join the expedition along with his two sons from his marriage to Raden Patah's daughter, and another son from another wife. The war fleet was prepared to depart from the port of Demak, blessed by Sunan Gunung Jati. The exceptionally large fleet for its time was led by Pati Unus. This massive war fleet set sail for Malacca, where the Portuguese had prepared a defense with dozens of large cannons protruding from the Malacca fortress.

As Pati Unus's ship was about to lower the boat to dock on the beach, it was struck by a cannonball, and he died as a result of the attack. The Javanese joint forces, who had also suffered heavy casualties, decided to retreat under the leadership of Raden Hidayat, the second in command after the death of Pati Unus. Upon the return of the remaining fleet to Java, Fadhlullah Khan, was appointed by Syarif Hidayatullah as the new Commander of the Joint Fleet, replacing Pati Unus who died in Malacca.

The failure of the second expedition to Malacca was partly due to internal factors, particularly issues of harmony among the sultanates of Indonesia.

Pati Unus's first and third sons also perished, while his second son, Raden Abdullah, survived and continued the lineage of Pati Unus. He joined the remaining fleet to return to Java. In the fleet that returned to Java, some soldiers of the Malacca Sultanate chose to migrate to Java as their homeland failed to be recaptured from the Portuguese colonizers. They were Malaccan Malays, and their descendants later assisted the descendants of Raden Abdullah, the son of Pati Unus, in the Islamization of the land of Pasundan.

== Sources ==
- Pires, Tomé, Suma Oriental
- Ricklefs, M. C., A History of Modern Indonesia since c. 1200, Palgrave MacMillan, New York, 2008 (terbitan ke-4), ISBN 978-0-230-54686-8
