= Spread of Islam in Indonesia =

Islamic conversion of Indonesia

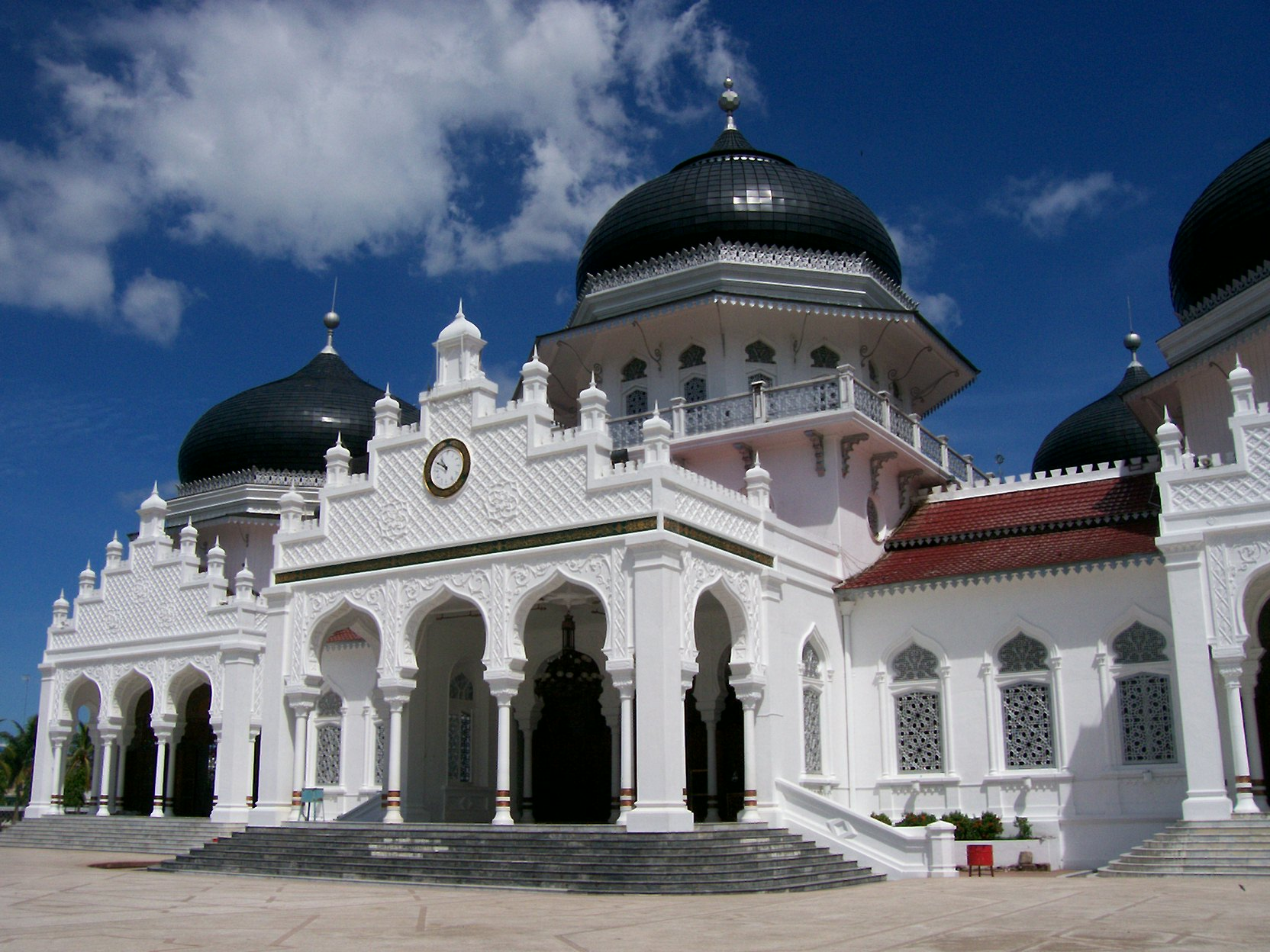
Baiturrahman Grand Mosque in Banda Aceh, Aceh. The spread of Islam in Indonesia began in the region.

The history of the arrival of Islam in Indonesia is somewhat unclear. One theory states that Islam arrived directly from Arabia as early as the 9th century, during the time of the Umayyad and Abbasid caliphates. Another theory credits Sufi travelers for bringing Islam in the 12th or 13th century, either from Gujarat in India or from Persia. Before the archipelago's conversion to Islam, the predominant religions in Indonesia were Hinduism (particularly its Shaivism tradition) and Buddhism.

The islands that now constitute Indonesia have been recognized for centuries as a source of spices such as nutmeg and cloves, which were key commodities in the spice trade long before the Portuguese arrived in the Banda Islands in 1511. Due to the archipelago's strategic place as the gateway between the Muslim world and Imperial China, it became a busy international hub for merchants engaged in many forms of trade. It became a place where different peoples shared their respective cultures, including Islam.

Despite being one of the most significant developments in Indonesian history, evidence about the coming of Islam to Indonesia is limited; there is considerable debate among scholars about what conclusions can be drawn about the conversion of Indonesian peoples. The primary evidence, at least of the earlier stages of the process, are gravestones and a few travelers' accounts, but these can only show that indigenous Muslims were in a certain place at a certain time. This evidence cannot explain more complicated matters such as how lifestyles were affected by the new religion or how deeply it affected societies. It cannot be assumed, for example, that because a ruler was known to be a Muslim, the Islamization of that area was therefore widespread. Nevertheless, a clear turning point occurred when the Hindu Majapahit empire in Java fell to the Islamised Demak Sultanate. In 1527, the Muslim ruler renamed the newly conquered Sunda Kelapa as Jayakarta (meaning "precious victory") which was eventually contracted to Jakarta.

The spread of Islam was slow. The limited evidence that is currently known suggests that the spread of Islam accelerated in the 15th century. One of the defining characteristics of the spread was that it was achieved through generally peaceful means. As Muslim traders settled in coastal areas, they began to assimilate with the local population. Soon new Muslim communities were created, as evidenced by the travel journals of Ibn Battuta, Zheng He, and Marco Polo. Many Muslims inter-married with royalties, with their descendants establishing various sultanates in Sumatra and Java.

Dominant kingdoms included Mataram in Central Java, and the sultanates of Ternate and Tidore in the Maluku Islands to the east. By the end of the 13th century, Islam had been established in North Sumatra; by the 14th in northeast Malaya, Brunei, the southern Philippines and among some courtiers of East Java; and the 15th in Malacca and other areas of the Malay Peninsula. Although it is known that the spread of Islam began in the west of the archipelago, the fragmentary evidence does not suggest a rolling wave of conversion through adjacent areas; rather, it suggests the process was complicated and slow.

== Early history ==
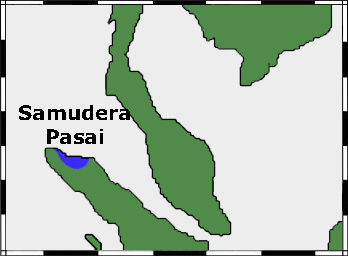
Samudera Pasai Sultanate map

Before Islam was established in Indonesian communities, Muslim traders had been present for several centuries. Ricklefs identifies two overlapping processes by which the Islamisation of Indonesia occurred: (1) Indonesians came into contact with Islam and converted, and (2) foreign Muslim Asians (Indians, Chinese, Arabs, etc.) settled in Indonesia and mixed with local communities. Islam is thought to have been present in Southeast Asia from early in the Islamic era. When, why and how the earliest Muslims converted in Indonesia is a matter of debate. There are no definite conclusions as to how the process of early Islamisation occurred with any certainty, due to the lack of written sources.

The earliest accounts of the Indonesian archipelago date from the Abbasid Caliphate. According to those early accounts, the Indonesian archipelago was famous among early Muslim sailors, mainly due to its abundance of precious spice trade commodities such as nutmeg, cloves, galangal and many other spices.

The presence of foreign Muslims in Indonesia does not, however, demonstrate a significant level of local conversion or the establishment of local Islamic states. The most reliable evidence of the early spread of Islam in Indonesia comes from inscriptions on tombstones and a limited number of travellers' accounts. The earliest legibly inscribed tombstone is dated AH 475 (AD 1082), although as it belongs to a non-Indonesian Muslim, there is doubt as to whether it was transported to Java at a later time. The first evidence of Indonesian Muslims comes from northern Sumatra. In 1111, some local Acehnese were converted by an Arab called 'Abd-Allah 'Arif. One of his disciples, Burhan al-Din spread Islam as far as Pariaman at Minangkabau region in West Sumatra. Marco Polo, on his way home from China in 1292, reported at least one Muslim town; and the first evidence of a Muslim dynasty is the gravestone, dated AH 696 (AD 1297), of Sultan Malik al Saleh, the first Muslim ruler of Samudera Pasai Sultanate, with further gravestones indicating continued Islamic rule. The presence of the Shafi'i school of thought, which later came to dominate Indonesia, was reported by Ibn Battuta, a Moroccan traveller, in 1346. In his travel log, Ibn Battuta wrote that the ruler of Samudera Pasai was a Muslim who performs his religious duties with utmost zeal. The school of thought he used was Al-Shafi‘i with similar customs to those he had seen in India. Many of the Indonesians who studied in Hejaz had specifically sought Kurdish teachers, likely due to them also being Shafi'i. Kurdish teaching had an influence on Indonesian Muslims.

== Influences of Zheng He's voyages ==
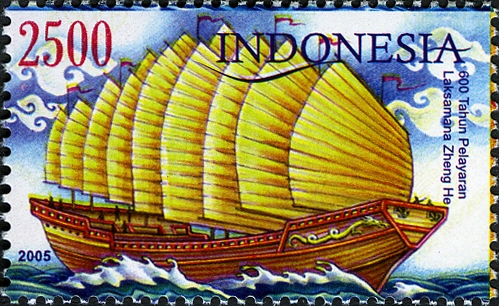
Stamps of Indonesia commemorating Zheng He's voyages to secure the maritime routes, usher urbanization and assist in creating a common prosperity

Zheng He is credited to have settled Chinese Muslim communities in Palembang and along the shores of Java, the Malay Peninsula, and the Philippines. These Muslims allegedly followed the Hanafi school in the Chinese language. This Chinese Muslim community was led by Hajji Yan Ying Yu, who urged his followers to assimilate and take local names.

Zheng He (1371–1433 or 1435), originally named Ma He, was a Hui court eunuch, mariner, explorer, diplomat, and fleet admiral during China's early Ming dynasty. Zheng commanded expeditionary voyages to Southeast Asia, South Asia, Western Asia, and East Africa from 1405 to 1433. His larger ships stretched 400 feet in length (Columbus's Santa Maria, for comparison, was 85 feet). These carried hundreds of sailors on four tiers of decks. As a favorite of the Yongle Emperor, whose usurpation he assisted, he rose to the top of the imperial hierarchy and served as commander of the southern capital Nanjing (the capital was later moved to Beijing by the Yongle Emperor). These voyages were long neglected in official Chinese histories but have become well-known in China and abroad since the publication of Liang Qichao's Biography of Our Homeland's Great Navigator, Zheng He in 1904. A trilingual stele left by the navigator was discovered on the island of Sri Lanka shortly thereafter.

== By region ==
It was initially believed that Islam penetrated Indonesian society in a largely peaceful way, (which is still largely true according to many scholars) and from the 14th century to the end of the 19th century the archipelago saw almost no organised Muslim missionary activity. Later findings of scholars say that some parts of Java, i.e. Sunda kingdom West Java and the kingdom of Majapahit on East Java was conquered by Javanese Muslims. The Hindu-Buddhist Sunda Kingdom of Pajajaran was conquered by Muslims in the 16th century, while the Muslim-coastal and Hindu-Buddhist-interior part of East Java was often at war. Organised spread of Islam is also evident by the existence of the Wali Sanga (nine holy patriarchs) who are credited for the Islamisation of Indonesia during this period.

=== Northern Sumatra ===
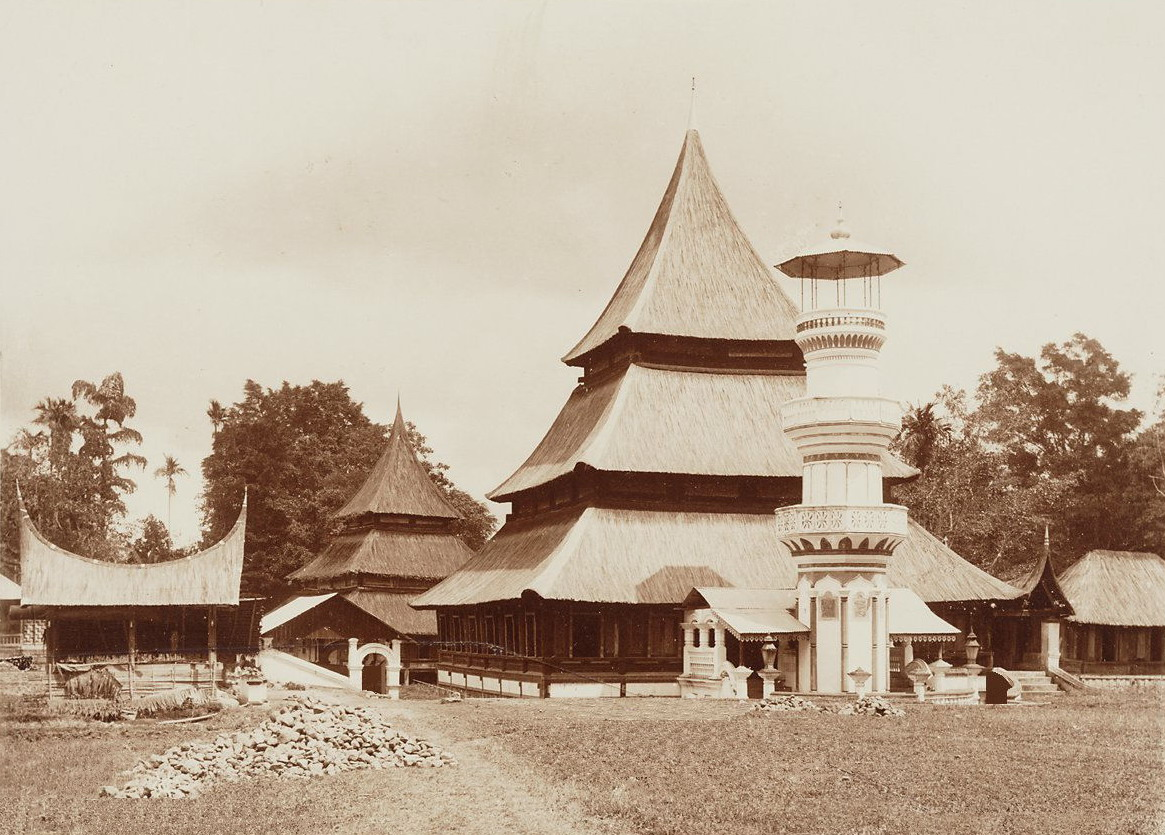
Mosque in West Sumatra with traditional Minangkabau architecture

Firmer evidence documenting continued cultural transitions comes from two late-14th century gravestones from Minye Tujoh in North Sumatra, each with Islamic inscriptions but in Indian-type characters and the other Arabic. Dating from the 14th century, tombstones in Brunei, Terengganu (northeast Malaysia) and East Java are evidence of Islam's spread. The Trengganu stone has a predominance of Sanskrit over Arabic words, suggesting the representation of the introduction of Islamic law. According to the Ying-yai Sheng-lan: The overall survey of the ocean's shores' (1433) a written account by Zheng He's chronicler and translator Ma Huan: "the main states of the northern part of Sumatra were already Islamic Sultanates. In 1414, he visited the Malacca Sultanate, its ruler Iskandar Shah was Muslim and also his people, and they were very strict believers".

In Kampong Pande, the tombstone of Sultan Firman Syah, the grandson of Sultan Johan Syah, has an inscription stating that Banda Aceh was the capital of the Kingdom of Aceh Darussalam and that it was built on Friday, 1 Ramadhan (22 April 1205) by Sultan Johan Syah after he defeated the Hindu and Buddhist Kingdom of Indra Purba whose capital was Bandar Lamuri. The establishment of further Islamic states in North Sumatra is documented by late 15th- and 16th-century graves including those of the first and second Sultans of Pedir; Muzaffar Syah, buried (1497) and Ma'ruf Syah, buried (1511). Aceh was founded in the early 16th century and would later become the most powerful North Sumatran state and one of the most powerful in the whole Malay archipelago. The Aceh Empire's first sultan was Ali Mughayat Syah whose tombstone is dated (1530).

The book of Portuguese apothecary Tomé Pires that documents his observations of Java and Sumatra from his 1512 to 1515 visits, is considered one of the most important sources on the spread of Islam in Indonesia. In 1520, Ali Mughayat Syah started military campaigns to dominate the northern part of Sumatra. He conquered Daya, and submitted the people to Islam. Further conquests extended down the east coast, like Pidie and Pasai incorporating several pepper-producing and gold-producing regions. The addition of such regions ultimately led to internal tensions within the Sultanate, as Aceh's strength was as a trading port, whose economic interests vary from those of producing ports.

At this time, according to Pires, most Sumatran kings were Muslim; from Aceh and south along the east coast to Palembang the rulers were Muslim, while south of Palembang and around the southern tip of Sumatra and up the west coast, most were not. In other Sumatran kingdoms, such as Pasai and Minangkabau the rulers were Muslim although at that stage their subjects and peoples of neighboring areas were not, however, it was reported that the religion was continually gaining new adherents.

After the arrival of the Portuguese colonials and the tensions that followed regarding control of the spice trade, the Acehnese Sultan Alauddin al-Kahar (1539–71) sent an embassy to the Ottoman Sultan Suleiman the Magnificent in 1564, requesting Ottoman support against the Portuguese Empire. The Ottomans then dispatched their admiral Kurtoğlu Hızır Reis he set sail with a force of 22 ships carrying soldiers, military equipment and other supplies. According to accounts written by the Portuguese Admiral Fernão Mendes Pinto, the Ottoman fleet that first arrived in Aceh consisted of a few Turks and largely of Muslims from the ports of the Indian Ocean.

=== East Sumatra and Malay peninsula ===
Founded around the beginning of the 15th century by Sultan Parameswara, the great Malay trading state The Sultanate of Malacca founded by Sultan Parameswara, was, as the most important trading center of the Southeast Asian archipelago, a center of foreign Muslims, and it thus appears a supporter of the spread of Islam. Parameswara, himself is known to have converted to Islam, and taken the name Iskandar Shah after the arrival of the Hui-Chinese Admiral Zheng He. From Malacca and elsewhere, gravestones survive showing not only its spread in the Malay archipelago but as the religion of a number of cultures and their rulers in the late 15th century.

=== Central and eastern Java ===
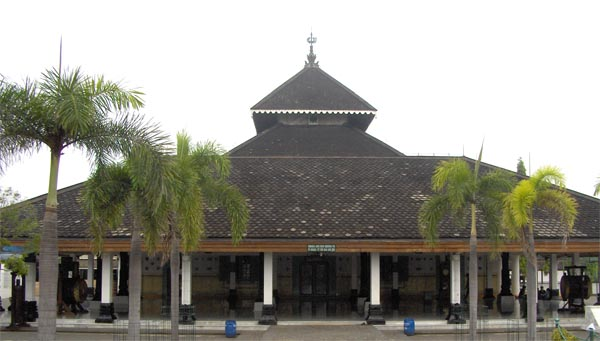
Grand Mosque of Demak, the first Muslim state in Java

Inscriptions in Old Javanese rather than Arabic on a significant series of gravestones dating back to 1369 in East Java, indicate that these are almost certainly Javanese, rather than foreign Muslims. Due to their elaborate decorations and proximity to the site of the former Hindu-Buddhist Majapahit capital, Damais concludes that these are the graves of very distinguished Javanese, perhaps even royalty. This suggests that some of the Javanese elite adopted Islam at a time when the Hindu-Buddhist Majapahit was at the height of its glory.

Ricklefs (1991) argues that these east Javan gravestones, sited and dated at the non-coastal Majapahit, cast doubt on the long-held view that Islam in Java originated on the coast and represented political and religious opposition to the kingdom. As a kingdom with far-reaching political and trading contacts, Majapahit would have almost certainly been in contact with Muslim traders, however there is conjecture over the likelihood of its sophisticated courtiers being attracted to a religion of merchants. Rather, mystical Sufi Muslim teachers, possibly claiming supernatural powers (keramat), are thought to be a more probable agent of religious conversion of Javanese court elites, who had long been familiar with aspects of Hindu and Buddhist mysticism.

Central and East Java, the areas where the ethnic Javanese lived, was still claimed by the Hindu-Buddhist king living in the interior of east java at Daha. The coastal areas such as Surabaya were, however, Islamised and were often at war with the interior, except for Tuban, which remained loyal to the Hindu-Buddhist king. Some of the coastal Muslim lords were converted Javanese, or Muslim Chinese, Indians, Arabs, and Malays who had settled and established their trading state on the coast. This war between the Muslim-coast and Hindu-Buddhist interior also continued long after the fall of the Majapahit by the Demak Sultanate, and the animosity also continues long after both regions had adopted Islam.

When the peoples of the north coast of Java adopted Islam is unclear. Chinese Muslim, Ma Huan who was a follower of Zheng He, the envoy sent by Yongle Emperor of Ming China, visited the Java coast in 1416 and reported in his book, Ying-yai Sheng-lan: The overall survey of the ocean's shores' (1433), that there were only three types of people in Java: Muslims from the west, Chinese (some Muslim) and the heathen Javanese. Since the east Javan gravestones were those of Javanese Muslims fifty years before, Ma Huan's report indicates that Islam may have indeed been adopted by Javanese courtiers before the coastal Javanese.

An early Muslim gravestone dated AH 822 (AD 1419) has been found at Gresik an East Javanese port and marks the burial of Malik Ibrahim. As it appears, however, that he was a non-Javanese foreigner, the gravestone does not provide evidence of coastal Javanese conversion. Malik Ibrahim was, however, according to Javanese tradition one of the first nine apostles of Islam in Java (the Wali Sanga) although no documentary evidence exists for this tradition. In the late 15th century, the powerful Majapahit empire in Java was at its decline. After having been defeated in several battles, the last Hindu kingdom in Java fell under the rising power of Islamised Kingdom of Demak in 1520.

=== Western Java ===
Pires' Suma Oriental reports that Sundanese-speaking West Java was not Muslim in his day, and was indeed hostile to Islam. A Muslim conquest of the area occurred later in the 16th century. In the early 16th century, the Central and East Java (home of the Javanese) were still claimed by the Hindu-Buddhist king living in the interior of East Java at Daha (Kediri). The north coast was, however, Muslim as far as Surabaya and was often at war with the interior. Of these coastal Muslim lords, some were Javanese who had adopted Islam, and others were not originally Javanese but Muslim traders settling along established trading routes including Chinese, Indians, Arabs and Malays. According to Piers, these settlers and their descendants so admired Javanese Hindu-Buddhist culture that they emulate its style and were thus themselves becoming Javanese.

In his study of the Banten Sultanate, Martin van Bruinessen focuses on the link between mystics and royalty, contrasting that Islamisation process with the one which prevailed elsewhere in Java: "In the case of Banten, the indigenous sources associate the tarekats not with trade and traders but with kings, magical power and political legitimation." He presents evidence that Sunan Gunungjati was initiated into the Kubra, and Shattari, orders of sufism.

=== Other areas ===
There is no evidence of the adoption of Islam by Indonesians before the 16th century in areas outside of Java, Sumatra, the sultanates of Ternate and Tidore in Maluku, and Brunei and the Malay Peninsula.

== Indonesian and Malay legends ==
Although time frames for the establishment of Islam in Indonesian regions can be broadly determined, the historical primary sources cannot answer many specific questions, and considerable controversy surrounds the topic. Such sources do not explain why significant conversions of Indonesians to Islam did not begin until after several centuries of foreign Muslims visiting and living in Indonesia, nor do they adequately explain the origin and development of Indonesia's idiosyncratic strains of Islam, or how Islam came to be the dominant religion in Indonesia. To fill these gaps, many scholars turn to Malay and Indonesian legends surrounding Indonesian conversion to Islam. Ricklefs argues that although they are not reliable historical accounts of actual events, they are valuable in illuminating some of the events is through their shared insights into the nature of learning and magical powers, foreign origins and trade connections of the early teachers, and the conversion process that moved from the elite downwards. These also provide insight into how later generations of Indonesians view Islamisation. These sources include:

- Hikayat Raja-raja Pasai ("The Story of the kings of Pasai") – an Old Malay text that tells how Islam came to "Samudra" (Pasai, northern Sumatra), where the first Indonesian Islamic state was founded.
- Sejarah Melayu ("Malay History") – an Old Malay text, which like Hikayat Raja-raja Pasai tells the story of the conversion of Samudra, but also tells of the conversion of the King of Malacca.
- Babad Tanah Jawi ("History of the land of Java") – a generic name for a large number of manuscripts, in which the first Javanese conversions are attributed to the Wali Sanga ("nine saints").
- Sejarah Banten ("History of Banten") – a Javanese text containing stories of conversion.

Of the texts mentioned here, the Malay texts describe the conversion process as a significant watershed, signified by formal and tangible signs of conversion such as circumcision, the Confession of Faith, and the adoption of an Arabic name. On the other hand, while magical events still play a prominent role in the Javanese accounts of Islamisation, such turning points of conversion as in the Malay texts are otherwise not as evident. This suggests a more adsorptive process for the Javanese, that is consistent with the significantly larger syncretic element in contemporary Javanese Islam in comparison to the relatively orthodox Islam of Sumatra and Malaysia.

== Flags of the Sultanates in the East Indies (Indonesia) ==
Flag of Banten Sultanate

Flag of Cirebon Sultanate

Flag of Mataram Sultanate

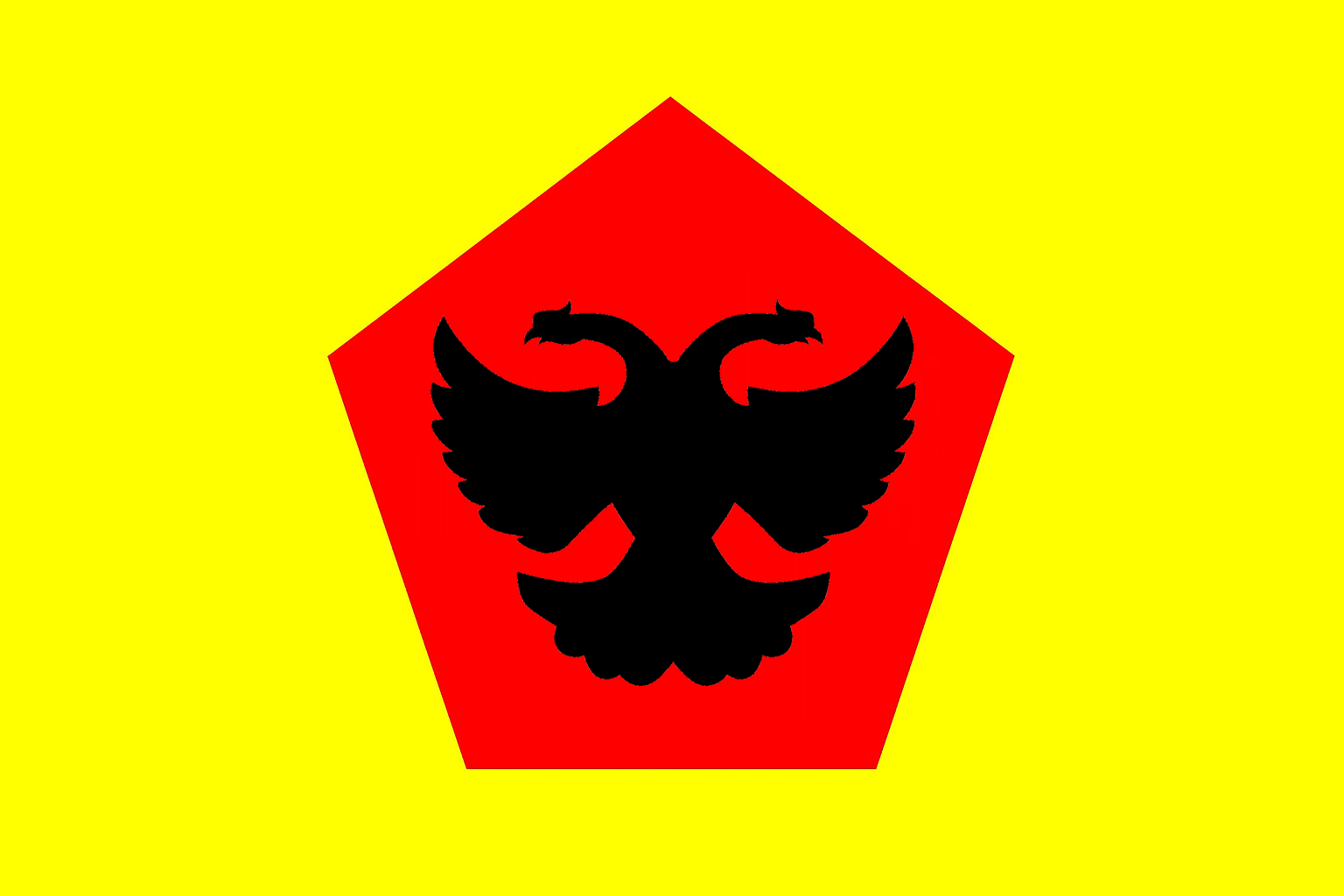
Flag of Bima Sultanate

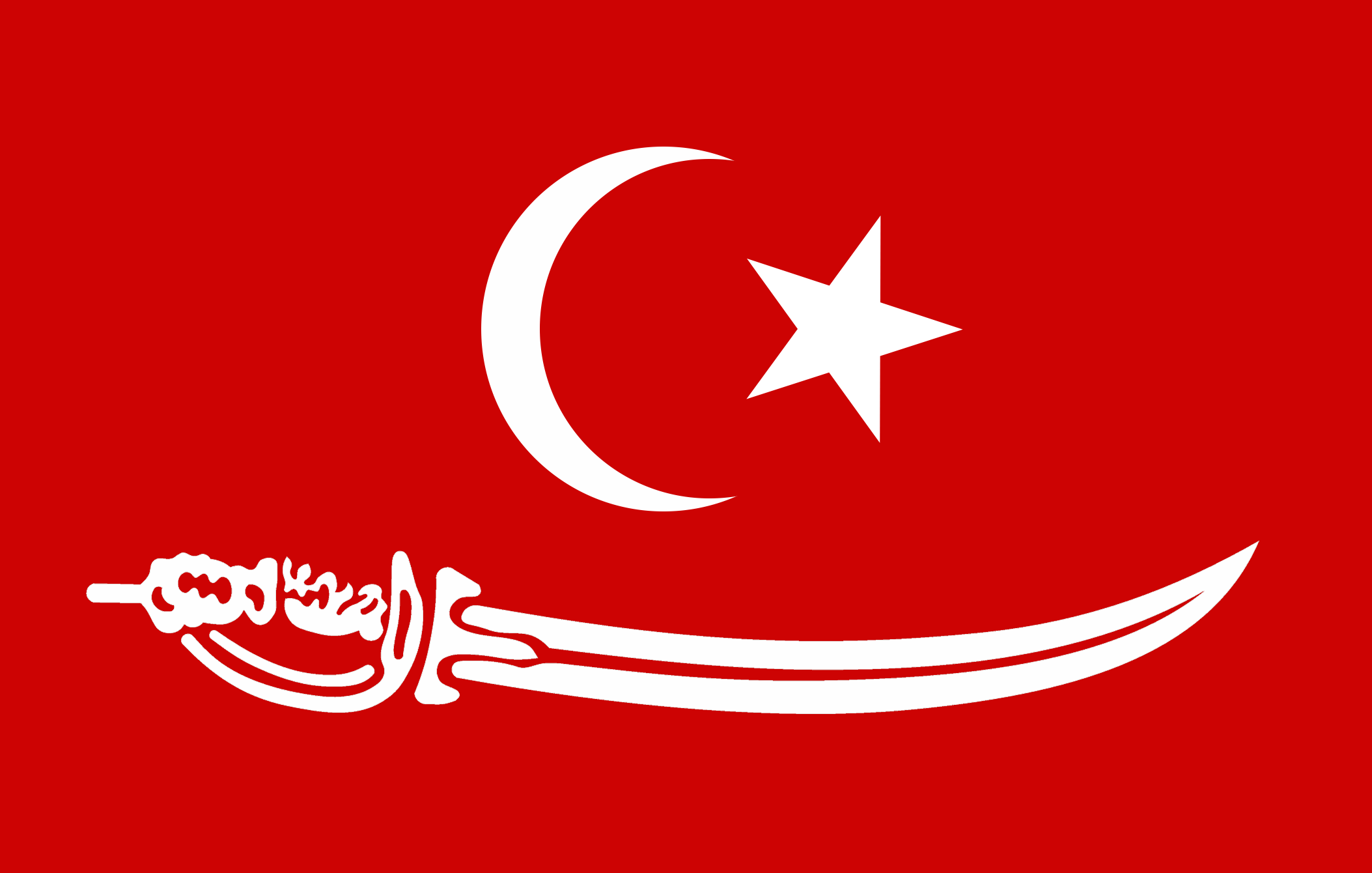
Flag of Aceh Sultanate

Flag of Gowa Sultanate

Flag of Surakarta Sultanate

Flag of Siak Sultanate

== See also ==
- Islam in Indonesia
- History of Indonesia
- Mosques in Indonesia
- Spread of Islam in Southeast Asia
- Spread of Islam
