= Babad Tanah Jawi =

Collection of Javanese manuscripts

The first volume of a 1917 printed edition by Rd. Pandji Djojosubroto (Serat Babad Tanah Jawi; G.C.T. Van & Company)

Babad Tanah Jawi (Javanese: ꦧꦧꦢ꧀ꦠꦤꦃꦗꦮꦶ, lit. 'History of the land of Java'), is a generic title for many manuscripts written in the Javanese language. Their arrangements and details vary, and no copies of any of the manuscripts are older than the 18th century.

Due to the scarcity and limitations of primary historical records, Babad Tanah Jawi is one of several accounts of Indonesian legends that scholars use to help illuminate aspects of the spread of Islam in Indonesia, the dominant religion in the Indonesian archipelago since the 16th century.

The texts attribute the first Javanese conversions to Islam to the Wali Sanga ("nine saints"), although their names and relationships vary across the texts to the extent that perfect reduction and agreement among them is not possible. Although most of the manuscripts accept the convention of nine saints, a number lists ten. These names commonly appear throughout the Babad Tanah Jawi texts:

- Sunan Ngampel-Denta
- Sunan Kudus
- Sunan Murya
- Sunan Bonang
- Sunan Giri
- Sunan Kalijaga
- Sunan Sitijenar
- Sunan Gunungjati
- Sunan Walilanang
- Sunan Bayat (an oft-mentioned tenth saint)

== See also ==
- Sejarah Banten
