= Great Mosque of Mataram Kotagede =

Historic mosque in the Kotagede town of Yogyakarta, Indonesia

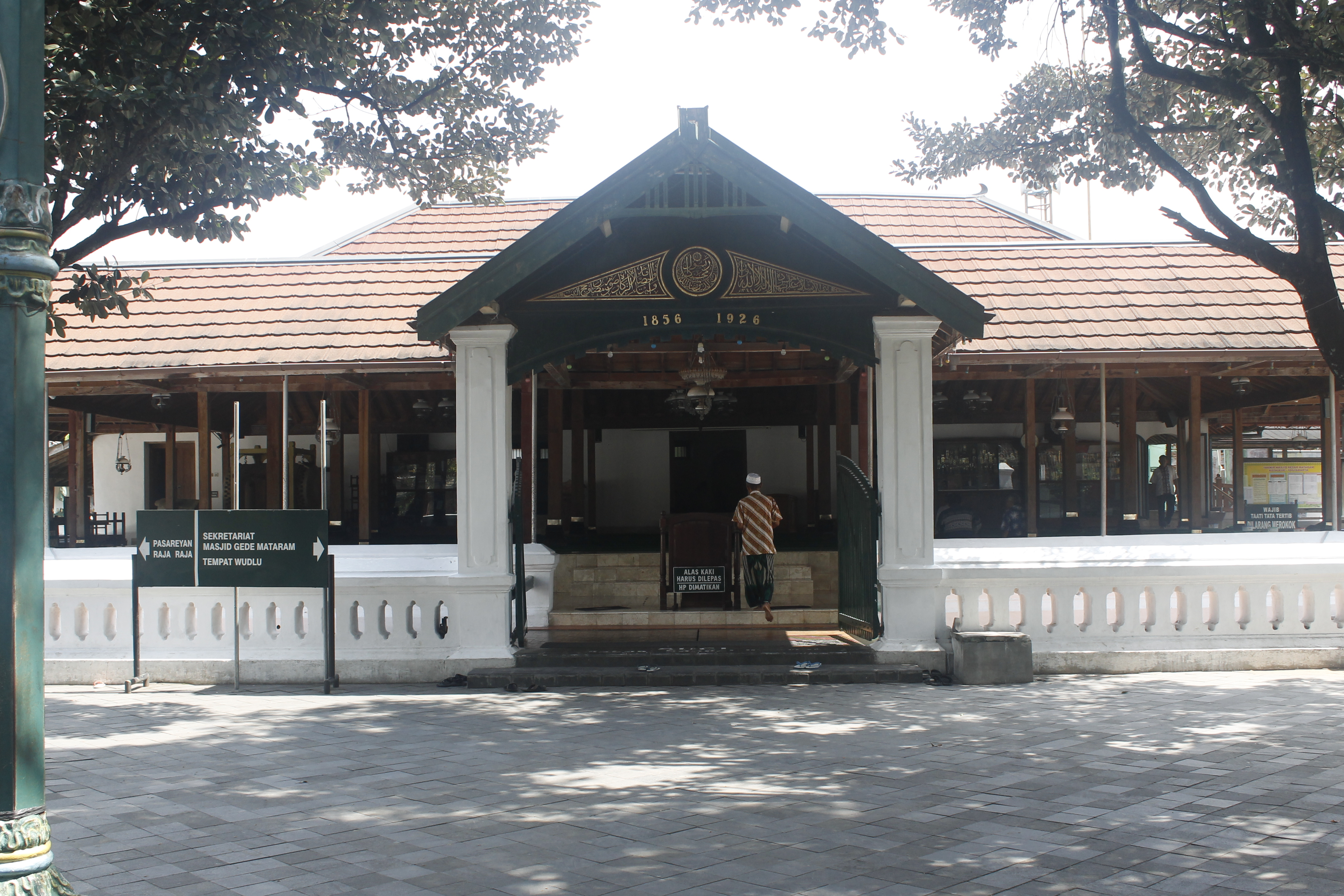
- Main entrance to the mosque.

- Location in Indonesia

Religion
- Affiliation: Sunni Islam

Location
- Location: 59CX+67V, Jalan Masjid Besar Mataram, Sayangan, Jagalan, Kec. Banguntapan, Kabupaten Bantul, Daerah Istimewa Yogyakarta 55192, Indonesia
- Country: Indonesia
- Coordinates: 7°49′45″S 110°23′54″E

Architecture
- Type: Mosque
- Style: Javanese architecture
- Established: 1575
- Completed: 1920s
- Dome: 1

The Great Mosque of Mataram Kotagede (Indonesian: Masjid Gede Mataram Kotagede, ꦩꦱ꧀ꦗꦶꦢ꧀ꦒꦼꦝꦺꦩꦠꦫꦩ꧀) is a mosque located in the historic neighborhood of Kotagede in southern Java, Indonesia. First built in 1575 and later rebuilt during the reign of Senapati of Mataram, it is the oldest mosque in Yogyakarta.

== History ==
The mosque was built in 1575 during the reign of Joko Tingkir (r. 1549–1582), the first ruler of the Kingdom of Pajang that held sway over Yogyakarta in the 16th century and further improvements continued into the reign of Arya Pangiri (r. 1583–1586). After the Mataram Sultanate gained control of Yogyakarta, Kyai Senapati rebuilt the mosque in 1587 under the recommendations of his religious mentor, Sunan Kalijaga. The Hindu and Buddhist residents of Yogyakarta assisted in the construction process, helping to design the mosque and build the entrance gateways. In 1611, Sultan Agung further renovated the mosque, expanding it to accommodate the rapidly growing Muslim population around Kotagede as well as adding a verandah, porch and wide courtyard to the existing structure. After a fire had destroyed the mosque in 1919, Pakubuwono X ordered yet another reconstruction of the mosque. The Muhammadiyah organization later reinforced the wooden tiered roof with ceramic tiles in the 1920s.

== Architecture ==
The mosque is built in a traditional Javanese architectural style which includes elements from Hindu and Buddhist styles. Bricks made out of stone are used in the construction of the walls surrounding the main prayer hall of the mosque. On these walls, floral carvings as well as Hindu-inspired decorations can be seen, such as the carving of the face of a Barong, a creature from the mythology of the Indonesian sects of Hinduism. Aside from the brick walls, the gateways of the mosque are completely Hindu and Buddhist in nature, due to the fact that Hindus and Buddhist residents helped with their designs and construction.

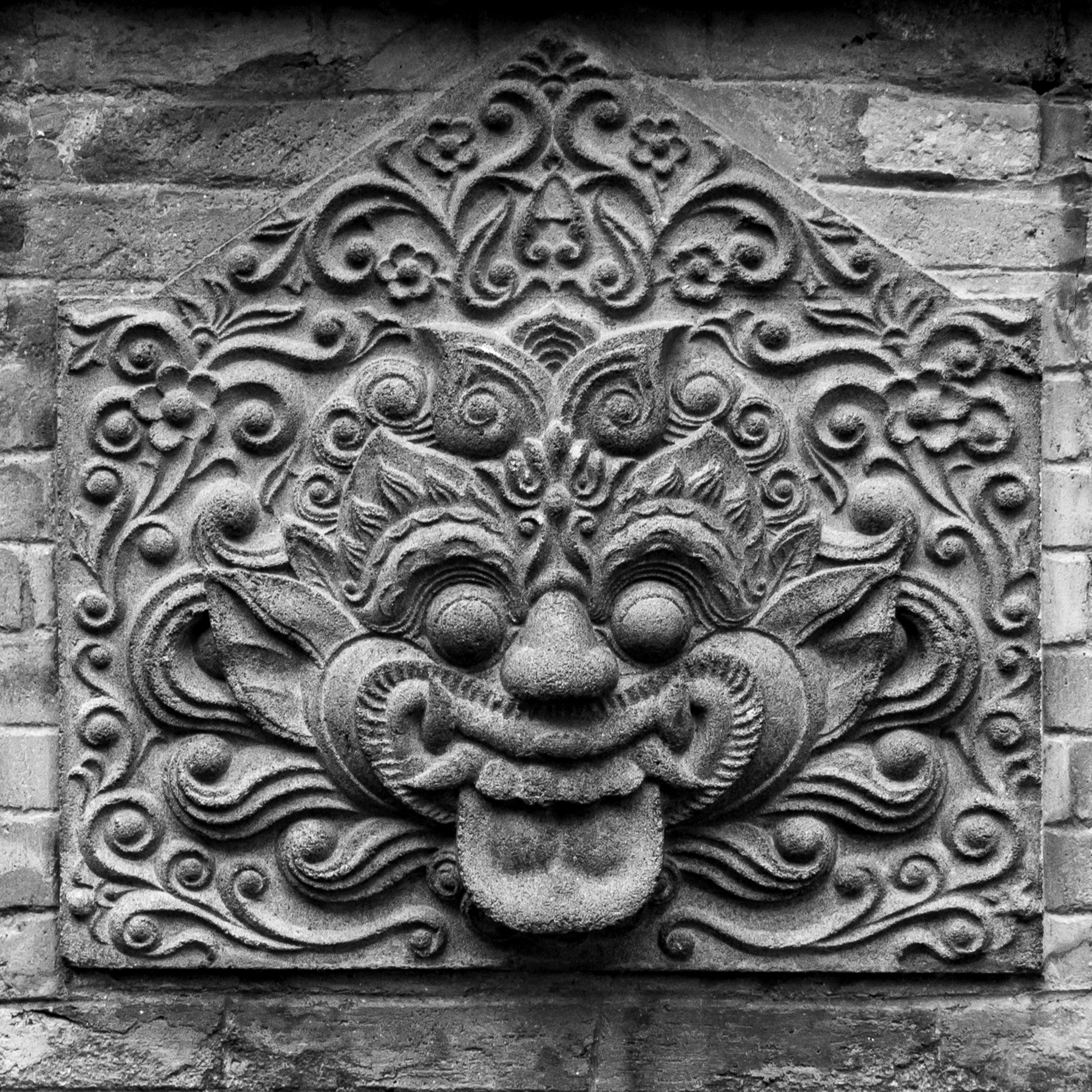
A carving of the head of a demon on one of the walls of the mosque.

The main prayer hall is elevated from the ground and accessible via a flight of steps at the entrance. The interior is fully carpeted, while the roofs of the main prayer hall are made of wood and are multi-tiered, a common feature in old mosques of Indonesia. Four wooden pillars, known as saka guru, hold up the central chamber of the main prayer hall. It is a basic square in layout, with a rectangular pavilion attached to it. The mosque has two minbars, both made of wood, while the second minbar has a carving of a qilin, a Chinese mythological creature, embedded into it.

To the west of the mosque is the royal cemetery of the Sultanate of Mataram, where the founder of the mosque, Kyai Senapati, and his relatives along with some of the later Sultans are buried.

== See also ==
- Kotagede
- Astana Pajimatan Himagiri
- List of mosques in Indonesia
