= Senapati of Mataram =

Sultan of Mataram

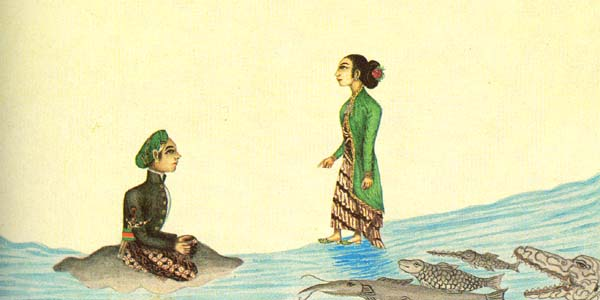
- A painting depicting Senapati's encounter with Nyi Roro Kidul

King of Mataram
- Reign: 1586–1601
- Successor: Hanyakrawati
- Born: Danang Sutawijaya or Dananjaya
- Died: 1601; Kajenar, Mataram Sultanate
- Burial: Kitha Ageng Royal Cemetery, Kitha Ageng, Mataram Sultanate
- Spouse: Queen Mas Waskitajawi; Queen Ratna Dumilah
- Issue: Hanyakrawati of Mataram
Regnal name
- Sampeyan Dalem Ingkang Sinuhun Kanjeng Panembahan Senapati ing Ngalaga Sayyidin Panatagama
Posthumous name
- Panembahan Seda ing Kajenar
- Father: Ki Ageng Pemanahan
- Mother: Nyi Sabinah

Panembahan Senapati, formally styled Panembahan Senapati ing Ngalaga Sayyidin Panatagama (died in Jenar (now Purwodadi, Purworejo), 1601), was the founder of the Mataram Sultanate.

== Origin ==
Born Danang Sutawijaya, known as Dananjaya, he was the son of Ki Ageng Pamanahan, a Javanese chief and retainer to Joko Tingkir, who reigned as Hadiwijaya, Sultan of Pajang. It was said that Pamanahan was a descendant of the last Majapahit king. Sutawijaya's mother was Nyai Sabinah who, according to Javanese chronicles, was a descendant of Sunan Giri, a member of Walisanga. Nyai Sabinah had a brother, Ki Juru Martani, who was elected as the first patih (viceregent) of Mataram. He had an important role in arranging a strategy to suppress Arya Penangsang's rebellion in 1549.

Sutawijaya was adopted by Hadiwijaya as an inducement because Hadiwijaya and his wife still had no children yet in that time. Hadiwijaya gave him a residence in the north of a market, thus his nickname "Raden Ngabehi Loring Pasar".

== Early role ==
According to Javanese tradition, the Senopati who was Joko Tingkir's foster son assassinated Arya Penangsang of Jipang-Panolan (now in Cepu, Blora Regency), making him the last direct heir of the Sultans of Demak. His death established the legitimacy of the Sultanate of Pajang.

== Senapati ing Alaga ==
Ki Ageng Pamanahan was granted Mataram region in 1556. After he died in 1575, Sutawijaya succeeded him as chief of Mataram, styled Senapati Ing Ngalaga (meaning "commander in the battlefield").

In 1576, Ngabehi Wilamarta and Ngabehi Wuragil of Pajang came to Mataram to ask for Mataram's loyalty, given that Senapati hadn't come to Pajang for more than a year. Senapati, who was riding his horse in Lipura village, didn't pay attention to them. However, the two senior officials were able to keep Sultan Hadiwijaya's feelings from the report they had arranged.

== Divine mandate ==
The traditional chronicle Babad Tanah Jawi alleges that Senopati, in his quest to become the supreme ruler of Java, had a spiritual alliance with Nyai Roro Kidul, the Javanese goddess of the Indian Ocean. The Babad, however, derives Senopati's support from Muslim saint Sunan Kalijaga, who is considered to be one of the Wali Songo or 'Nine Apostles' of Islam in Java. Other than Nyi Roro Kidul, Senapati also contacted the ruler of Mount Merapi. He also built fortifications and trained his soldiers.

== Rebellion against Pajang ==
In his effort, Senapati also dared to divert the journey of mantri pamajegan (tax collector) from Kedu and Bagelen who wanted to deliver tax to Pajang. They could be persuaded by Senapati so they swore allegiance to him.

Sultan Hadiwijaya was restless to hear about his adopted son's development. He then sent 3 messengers to investigate Mataram's development, i.e. Arya Pamalad of Tuban, Prince Benawa, and Patih Mancanegara. Senapati welcomed them with a party. However, there was a quarrel between Raden Rangga (Senapati's son) with Arya Pamalad.

In 1582, Sultan Hadiwijaya banished Tumenggung Mayang to Semarang because he had helped his son, Raden Pabelan, to enter keputren (residence for Mataram princesses) and seduce Ratu Sekar Kedaton, Sultan's youngest daughter. Raden Pabelan himself was sentenced to death and his corpse was thrown away to Jenes River in Laweyan (currently located in Surakarta).

Pabelan's mother was Senapati's sister. Senapati then sent mantri pamajegan to liberate Tumenggung Mayang who were on a journey to exile.

Outraged by Senapati's action, Sultan Hadiwijaya invaded Mataram with his soldiers. The war then took place. Pajang's soldiers could be defeated although outnumbered Mataram's one.

Sultan Hadiwijaya fell sick on his journey back to Pajang, and died after it. On his deathbed, Sultan Hadiwijaya requested his children not to dislike Senapati and they had to treat him as the eldest brother. Senapati himself also attended his adoptive father's funeral.

== King of Mataram ==
Arya Pangiri was Sultan Hadiwijaya's son-in-law who became Duke of Demak. Supported by Panembahan Kudus, he occupied Pajang in 1583 and ousted Prince Benawa by appointing him as Duke of Jipang.

Prince Benawa then allied with Senapati in 1586. They viewed Arya Pangiri's reign had harming the people of Pajang. The war broke out. Arya Pangiri was arrested and sent back to Demak.

Prince Benawa offered Pajang's throne to Senapati but refused. Senopati just demanded some Pajang's heirlooms to be looked after in Mataram.

Prince Benawa became Sultan of Pajang in 1587. He requested that Pajang be merged with Mataram. He requested Senapati to be Mataram's king. Pajang then became Mataram's vassal state, administered by Prince Gagak Baning, Senapati's brother.

Since that time, Senapati became the first king of Mataram, titled Panembahan. He didn't want to use Sultan as a title to honour Sultan Hadiwijaya and Prince Benawa. His royal court was located in Kotagede.

== Reign ==
During his reign, the kingdom adhered to Javanese traditions, although Islam had already been introduced to Java. The Javanese Muslim state of Pajang (and the ancient Hindu-Javanese kingdom of Mataram, still on the same site) got in trouble when Panembahan Senopati schemed to undermine the authority of the King of Pajang. Senopati had conquered the Mataram district himself and circa 1576 he conquered Pajang, imposed the new religion, and established his court. The Mataram ruler refused to embrace Islam. Many historiographical problems surrounded Senopati's reign. He concentrated his spiritual powers through meditation and asceticism. Senopati's reliance upon both Sunan Kalijaga and Nyai Loro Kidul in the chronicles' accounts nicely reflects the Mataram Dynasty's ambivalence towards Islam and indigenous Javanese beliefs. The straight line between Mount Merapi at the north and the southern sea, with the Mataram kingdom at the center, was a strong concept of cosmology among the Javanese.

Senopati's grandson, Sultan Agung (the Great Sultan, 1613–1645), was described as a great Muslim ruler and was claimed as the greatest of Mataram's rulers, though both Senopati and Sultan Agung established a liaison with the Goddess of the Southern Ocean of Nyai Loro Kidul.

== Expanding Mataram's territory ==
After Hadiwijaya's death, many vassal states in East Java seceded. The alliance of East Java's dukes was still led by Surabaya as the strongest entity. They were involved in a battle against Mataram in Mojokerto, but they could be mediated by Giri Kedaton's messenger.

Other than Pajang and Demak, Pati was also subjugated peacefully. Pati was led by Duke Pragola I, son of Ki Panjawi. His sister Queen Waskitajawi became the main queen consort of Mataram. It had made Duke Pragola I hope that Mataram would be led by his sister's descendants.

In 1590, joined troops of Mataram, Pati, Demak, and Pajang attacked Madiun, which was led by Rangga Jumena (the youngest son of Sultan Trenggana), who had prepared large troops awaiting the invader. With a brilliant trickery, Madiun was conquered. Rangga Jumena fled to Surabaya, while his daughter namely Retno Dumilah was married to Senapati.

In 1591, a coup d'etat took place in Kediri. Raden Senapati of Kediri was driven out by a new regent, Ratujalu, supported by Surabaya.

Raden Senapati of Kediri was adopted by Panembahan senapati as his son and he helped him to take over the throne of Kediri. The war ended with the death of both Raden Senapati with Duke Pesagi (his uncle).

In 1595, the Duke of Pasuruan intended to submit to Mataram peacefully, but was prevented by his commander, Rangga Kaniten. Rangga Kaniten was defeated by Panembahan Senapati in a duel. He was assassinated by the Duke of Pasuruan, who swore allegiance to Mataram.

In 1600, Duke Pragola I of Pati rebelled against Mataram. The rebellion was precipitated by the appointment of Retno Dumilah of Madiun as the second queen consort. Pati military forces were able to occupy some regions in the north of Mataram. A war broke out near Dengkeng River, where the Mataram force led by Senapati himself destroyed the Pati force.

== Death ==
Panembahan Senapati alias Danang Sutawijaya died in Kajenar village in 1601. He was buried in Mataram Cemetery, Kotagede, and was succeeded by his son Mas Jolang, born from Ratu Mas Waskitajawi.

== Children ==
- Queen consort of Pati
  - Raden Mas Jolang, later Panembahan Anyakrawati
- Queen consort of Madiun
  - Raden Mas Kanitren, titled Pangeran Adipati Martalaya
  - Raden Mas Julig, titled Pangeran Adipati Pringgalaya
- Secondary consort of Kalinyamat
  - Pangeran Rangga
- Secondary consort, Nyai Adisara
  - Raden Mas Kenthol Kejuron, titled Pangeran Adipati Puger, Pangeran Adipati of Demak
  - Raden Ajeng Denok, styled Raden Ayu Adipati Tepasana
- Secondary consort of Giring
  - Raden Mas Damar, titled Pangeran Adipati Purbaya
- Secondary consort of Kajoran
  - Raden Mas Gathot, titled Pangeran Riya Manggala
  - Raden Mas Bêthotot, titled Pangeran Adipati Jagaraga of Ponorogo
- Unknown
  - Ratu Pembayun
  - Raden Mas Bagus, titled Pangeran Adipati Juminah
  - Raden Ajeng Juwog, styled Raden Ayu Wiramantri of Ponorogo

== Notes ==
Preceded by None (first creation)	Panembahan of Mataram; 1586 – 1601	Succeeded by Anyokrowati
