= Ki Ageng Ngenis =

Indonesian preacher

- Died: Laweyan, Surakarta
- Burial place: Pasarean Laweyan, Laweyan, Surakarta
- Occupation: Preacher
- Spouse: Nyi Ageng Ngenis
- Children: Ki Ageng Pamanahan
- Relatives: Senapati of Mataram (grandson)

Ki Ageng Ngenis was an Indonesian preacher who played a role in preaching Islam in Surakarta. He was the father of Ki Ageng Pamanahan and the grandfather of Senapati of Mataram.

== Early life ==
Ki Ageng Ngenis was the only son and youngest of the seven children of Ki Ageng Selo and Nyai Bicak, Sunan Ngerang's daughter. His sisters were Nyai Ageng Lurung Tengah, Nyai Ageng Saba, Nyai Ageng Bangsri, Nyai Ageng Jati, Nyai Ageng Patanen, and Nyai Ageng Pakisdadu.

== Marriage ==
Ki Ageng Ngenis was married to Nyi Ageng Ngenis. They had a son, Ki Ageng Pamanahan, who later devoted himself to Sultan Hadiwijaya, the founder of Kingdom of Pajang. His grandson, Danang Sutawijaya, who later was known as Panembahan Senopati, was the founder of the Kingdom of Mataram.

== Career ==
Before Islam entered the area, the people in Surakarta, especially in Laweyan, practiced Hinduism. In Laweyan, there was a leader named Ki Ageng Beluk, who later became acquainted with Ki Ageng Ngenis. Ki Ageng Ngenis was then given a fief by Ki Ageng Beluk, where he taught the residents to develop thread into cloth and batik. While working on textiles in Laweyan, Ki Ageng Ngenis also spread Islam. The people of Laweyan were later successfully converted to Islam by Ki Ageng Ngenis, including Ki Ageng Beluk. The temple building owned by Ki Ageng Beluk was allowed to be converted into a mosque by Ki Ageng Ngenis, becoming Laweyan Mosque. Around 1546, Ki Ageng Ngenis settled in Laweyan, to the north of the Laweyan market.

== Death ==
Ki Ageng Ngenis resided in Laweyan until his death and was buried at Pasarean Laweyan. His tomb is located behind Laweyan Mosque. After his death, his house was occupied by his grandson, Danang Sutawijaya. Sutawijaya later moved to Mentawak Forest before establishing the Kingdom of Mataram and becoming its first king under the title Panembahan Senopati.

== Legacy ==
In Serat Kandha, Ki Ageng Ngenis is recorded as the spiritual teacher of Sultan Hadiwijaya when he still was called Joko Tingkir. After that, he served Sultan Hadiwijaya as an elder and was an important in the Sultanate of Pajang. Ki Ageng Ngenis was the ancestor of the Mataram kings. The Kingdom of Mataram later became the Surakarta Sunanate, the Yogyakarta Sultanate, the Mangkunegaran and the Pakualaman.
