= Kudus Regency =

Regency in Central Java, Indonesia

Kudus Regency Kabupaten Kudus
- Regency

Other transcription(s)
  - Javanese: ꦏꦸꦢꦸꦱ꧀
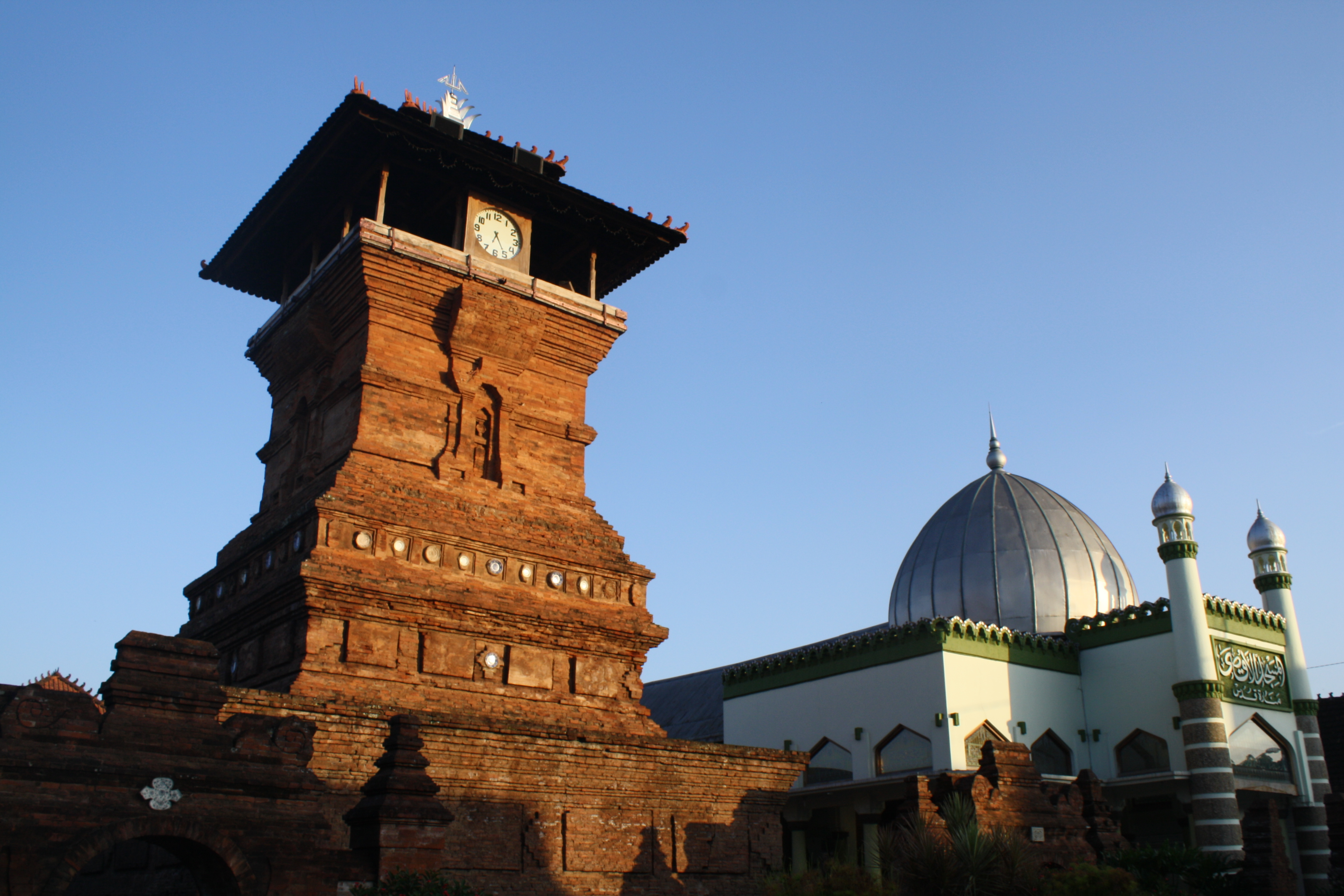
- Menara Kudus Mosque

- Coat of arms
- Motto(s): Nagri Carta Bhakti (Land of prosperity and devotion)
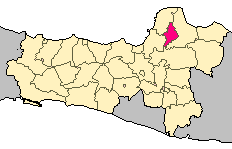
- Kudus Regency in Central Java
- Coordinates: 6°48′S 110°50′E
- Country: Indonesia
- Province: Central Java
- Districts: List: Kota Kudus; Kaliwungu; Jati; Undaan; Jekulo; Bae; Gebog; Mejobo; Dawe

Government
  - Regent: Sam'ani Intakoris
  - Vice Regent: Bellinda Putri Sabrina Birton

Area
  - Total: 425.15 km^{2} (164.15 sq mi)

Population (mid 2025 estimate)
  - Total: 891,721
  - Density: 2,097.4/km^{2} (5,432.3/sq mi)
- Time zone: UTC+7 (WIB)
- Post Code: 593xx
- Area code: 0291
- Website: kuduskab.go.id

Kudus (Javanese: ꦏꦸꦢꦸꦱ꧀ Pegon: قدوس) is a regency (Indonesian: kabupaten) in Central Java province in Indonesia. Kudus Regency is located between 6° 51’ and 7° 16’ South Latitude and between 110° 36' and 110° 50’ East Longitude. Its capital is the town of Kudus. It covers a land area of 425.15 km^{2} and is thus the smallest regency on Java Island in area, and it had a population of 777,437 at the 2010 Census and 849,184 at the 2020 Census; the official estimate as of mid 2025 was 891,721 (comprising 444,495 males and 447,226 females). It is located northeast of Semarang, the capital of Central Java.

== Geography ==
=== Regency Area Boundaries ===
The administrative boundaries of Kudus Regency include:

- North = Jepara Regency
- South = Grobogan Regency and Demak Regency
- West = Demak Regency
- East = Pati Regency

Most of the Kudus Regency area is lowland. In part of the northern region stands a mountain, namely Mount Muria, with the peaks Puncak Songolikur (Saptorenggo Peak) (1,602 m above sea level), Puncak Rahtawu (Rahtawu Peak) (1,522 m above sea level), and Puncak Argojembangan (Argojembangan Peak) (1,410 m above sea level). The largest river is the Kali Serang, which flows westward, bordering Kudus Regency and Demak Regency. Kudus is divided by the Gelis River in the middle, with the two sections known as Kudus West and Kudus East. Kudus Regency is the smallest regency in Central Java but the richest, with a per capita income exceeding IDR 123 million.

== History ==
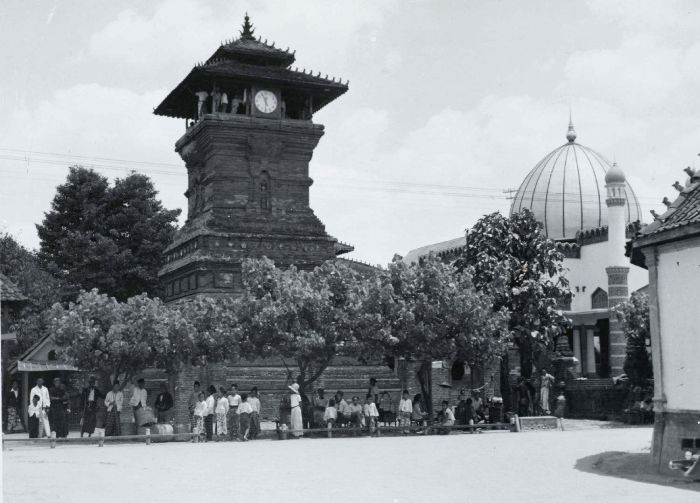
Minaret of Kudus mosque. Photo from colonial period.

The town of Kudus was something of an important Islamic holy city in the sixteenth century. It is the only place in Java to have permanently adopted an Arabic name ('al-Quds', Jerusalem). Sunan Kudus, one of the nine Wali Sanga, was said to have been the fifth imam (head) of the mosque of Demak and a major leader of the 1527 campaign against 'Majapahit', before moving to Kudus.

The Mosque of Kudus (Masjid Menara), dating to this period, remains a local landmark to this day. It is notable for both its perseverance of pre-Islamic architectural forms such as Old Javanese split doorways and Hindu-Buddhist influenced Majapahit-style brickwork, and for its name al-Manar or al-Aqsa. The date AH 956 (AD 1549) is inscribed over the mihrab (niche indicating the direction of Mecca).

== Administrative districts ==
The Regency comprises nine districts (kecamatan), tabulated below with their areas and their populations at the 2010 Census and the 2020 Census, together with the official estimates as of mid 2025. The table also includes the number of administrative villages in each district (totaling 123 rural desa and 9 urban kelurahan - the latter all in Kudus town District), and its post code.

Kode Wilayah	Name of District (kecamatan)	Area in km^{2}	Pop'n Census 2010	Pop'n Census 2020	Pop'n Estimate mid 2025	Admin centre	No. of villages	Post code
33.19.01	Kaliwungu	32.71	91,174	103,293	110,130	Kedungdowo	15	59332
33.19.02	Kota Kudus (Kudus town)	10.47	92,776	89,480	89,810	Purwosari	25 ^{(a)}	59311 -59319
33.19.03	Jati	26.30	99,466	108,819	114,080	Tanjung Karang	14	59341 -59349
33.19.04	Undaan ^{(b)}	71.77	69,073	76,128	80,830	Undaan Kidul	15	59372
33.19.05	Mejobo	36.77	69,754	77,434	81,750	Jepang	11	59381
33.19.06	Jekulo	82.92	98,741	108,658	114,230	Klaling	12	59382
33.19.07	Bae	23.32	66,333	73,903	78,160	Bae	10	59321 -59327
33.19.08	Gebog	55.06	93,915	104,313	110,160	Gondosari	11	59333
33.19.09	Dawe	85.84	96,205	106,685	112,580	Piji	18	59353
	Totals	425.15	777,437	849,184	891,721	Kudus (town)	132	

Note: (a) comprises 9 urban kelurahan (Kajeksan, Kerjasan, Mlati Kidul, Mlati Norowito, Panjunan, Purwosari, Sunggingan, Wergu Kulon, and Wergu Wetan) and 16 rural desa.
(b) Undaan District consists of a large southwards salient away from the rest of the Regency.

== Kudus town ==
The town of Kudus, including those parts of the regency that form part of the urban area (the surrounding Kaliwungu, Jati, Gebog, and Bae Districts), had a population of 358,335 at the 1990 Census. Although most residents of Kudus are Javanese, there is an Indonesian Chinese minority in the town centre, as well as an Arab neighborhood, Kudus Kulon, to the west of the town centre.

The town is considered to be the "birthplace" of the kretek clove cigarette, which is by far the most widely smoked form of tobacco in the country, and it remains a major centre for their manufacture. Haji Jamahri, a resident of the town, invented them in the 1880s. A festival named Dandangan is held for about one month before Ramadhan, the Muslim fasting month, in Kudus Kulon.

== Anti-nuclear movement ==
On June 12, 2007, about 5,000 people gathered peacefully to protest against Jakarta's plan to build 4 nuclear reactors in the region. The movement included residents, activists, artists, students, public officials, members of parliament, military commanders, and police chiefs. This movement has been part of a series of responses from across Indonesian society against the use of nuclear technology for energy production.

== Notable people ==
- Hariyanto Arbi, badminton player
- Hermawan Susanto, badminton player
- Liem Swie King, badminton player
- Eddy Hartono, badminton player
- Sudono Salim, businessman
- Anthoni Salim, businessman
- Robert Budi Hartono, businessman
- Michael Bambang Hartono, businessman
- Julie van der Veen, Dutch visual artist
- Sastromoeljono, former governor of Jakarta

== See also ==
- Sunan Kudus
