= Gedhe Pamanahan =

Kyai Gedhe Pamanahan was the first ruler of the Sultanate of Mataram. He is also referred to as Kyai Gedhe Mataram.

He was the descendant of Ki Ageng Selo (Sela is a village near present-day Demak). His father, Ki Ageng Ngenis, was a preacher who spread Islam in Surakarta. Pamanahan became the war advisor of the king of Pajang, Sultan Hadiwijaya. After Hadiwijaya won a battle against Arya Penangsang with his advice, he gave Pamanahan the land to the south in the Mentaok forest, near modern Surakarta, which became the Sultanate of Mataram, with the right of autonomous government.

Preceded by —	Sultan of Mataram; 1570s—ca. 1584	Succeeded by Senapati Ingalaga
