= Sunan Ngudung =

Sunan Ngudung, real name Shuraḥbīl (died 1524) was a statesman of the Demak Sultanate and a local Islamic religious leader. A contemporary of Trenggana, he served as a preacher at the main congregational mosque of the kingdom. Ngudung was the father of Sunan Kudus, a member of the Wali Sanga.

== Biography ==
His year of birth is unknown. According to the manuscript Serat Walisana, his real name was Shaykh Shurahbil, which had been corrupted to Sabil. Arabic records, however, show that his real name was ʿUthmān, and that he was the son of ʿAlī Murtaḍā, a prince from the Burji dynasty. His family claimed descent from the Islamic prophet Muhammad through Ali, the fourth Rashidun caliph and first Shi'ite Imam.

Sunan Ngudung was a companion of Raden Patah, the founder of the Demak Sultanate. Raden Patah appointed him as a statesman and military commander. He was also appointed as the head Imam at the first congregational mosque in Demak during the early reign of Trenggana in 1521.

When Trenggana was officialized as the new ruler of Demak in 1521, he clamped down on the remnants of the Majapahit, which included arresting their surviving loyalists and getting the remaining vassal states to submit to Demak authority as well as adopt Islam. Sunan Ngudung was appointed as the commander of an expedition against the state of Sidoarjo, a pro-Majapahit state, in 1524. During the expedition, he confronted the ruler of Terung and challenged him to a duel. Although Ngudung wore a suit of enhanced chainmail armour that the Majapahit forces did not have, his opponent was able to gain the upper hand, impaling him in the chest with the sword.

Ngudung left behind a son, Sunan Kudus, who succeeded his father in the position of being the head Imam of the grand mosque of Demak. Kudus was a conservative Muslim statesman who played an influential role in the politics of the Demak Sultanate, such as helping Arya Penangsang ascend the throne during the civil war that erupted after the death of Trenggana.

== Tomb ==
Sunan Ngudung was buried in the royal cemetery behind Masjid Agung Demak, next to Raden Patah.

== See also ==
- Sunan Kudus
- Islam in Indonesia
