= Laweyan Mosque =

Mosque in Surakarta, Central Java, Indonesia

Coordinates: 7°34′17″S 110°47′33″E

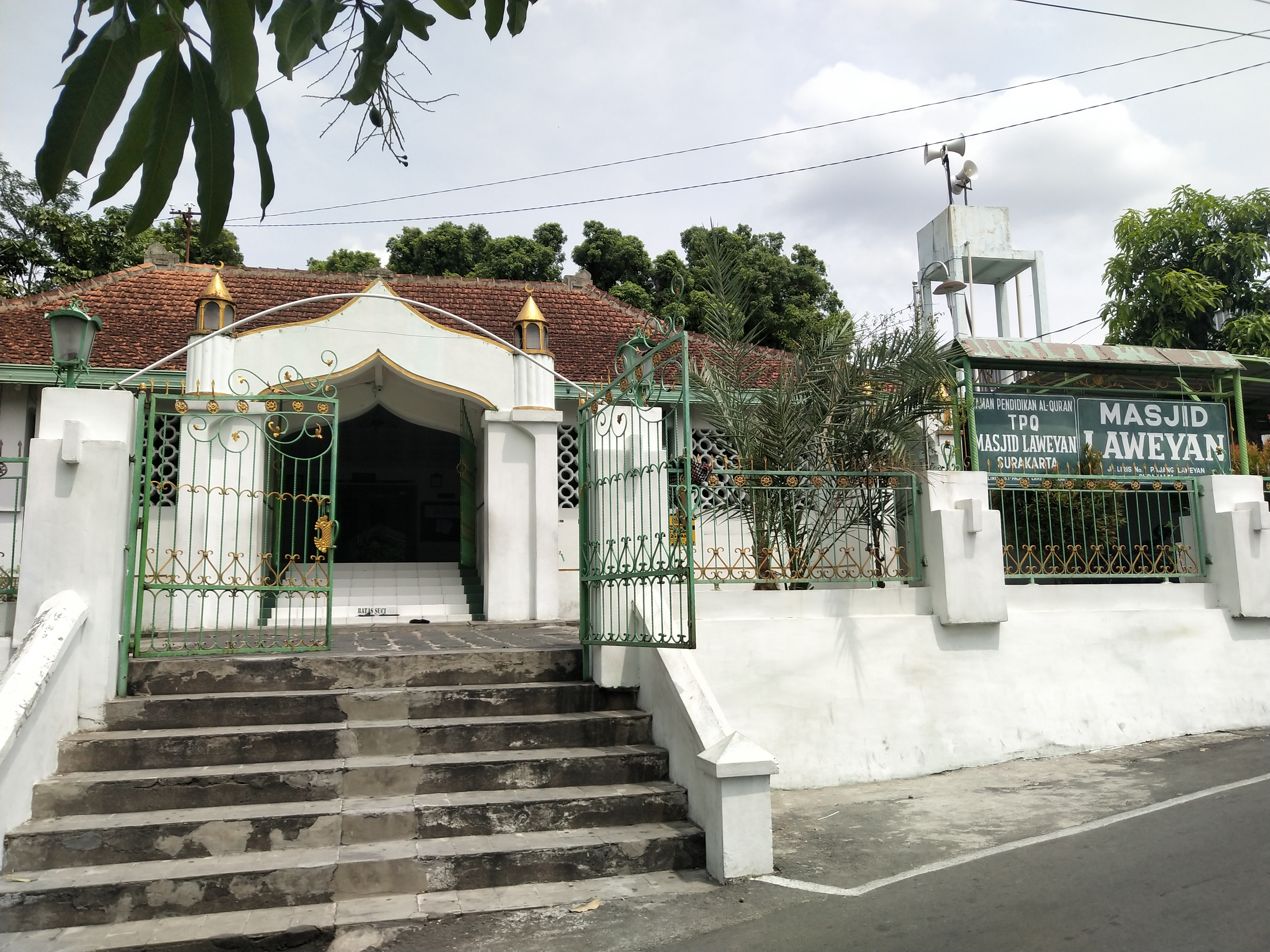

Religion
- Affiliation: Islam
- Province: Central Java

Location
- Location: Surakarta, Central Java, Indonesia
- Country: Indonesia
- Interactive map of Laweyan Mosque

Architecture
- Type: Mosque
- Style: Javanese vernacular

Laweyan Mosque is a historic mosque located in Surakarta, Central Java, Indonesia. The mosque was constructed in the 16th century, during the reign of Joko Tingkir of the Sultanate of Pajang, prior to the construction of the Great Mosque of Surakarta.

== History ==
According to traditional accounts such as Babad Tanah Jawi, Laweyan Mosque was constructed in 1546. It is regarded as the oldest mosque in Surakarta. The land the mosque was built on was given to Ki Ageng Ngenis, an important Islamic figure and advisor to Joko Tingkir, by Ki Ageng Beluk, a Hindu, for the purpose of constructing a mosque.

== Architecture ==
Laweyan Mosque, located in Surakarta, Central Java, showcases unique architectural features that reflect a fusion of Islamic and Javanese cultural influences. Like several other traditional Javanese mosques, Laweyan Mosque bears a strong resemblance to Javanese Hindu temples, most notably in its multi-tiered, stacked roof design known as tajug. This characteristic roof structure symbolizes a connection between the earthly realm and the divine, a concept rooted in pre-Islamic Javanese spiritual architecture.

The layout of Laweyan Mosque is consistent with the layout of other Javanese mosques. The mosque is divided into three parts: the main room, the right atrium (for women), and the left atrium (the larger area of the mosque, used for congregational prayers). There are three entrance hallways to the mosque, representing the three dimensions of Islamic religion: Islam, Iman, and Ihsan.

Ki Ageng Ngenis is buried behind Laweyan Mosque, as are some Surakartan nobles.

== See also ==
- List of mosques in Indonesia
