= Sunan Sitijenar =

Indonesian saint

Sunan Sitijenar is, according to the Babad Tanah Jawi ("History of the land of Java") manuscripts, one of the nine Wali Sanga ("Nine Saints") to whom Indonesian legend attributes the establishment of Islam as the dominant religion among the Javanese, Indonesia's largest ethnic group.

However, some Javanese texts relate stories about Syekh Siti Jenar (also known as Syekh Lemah Abang) having conflicts with the Wali Sanga and the Sultanate of Demak. This was because his perspective on Islam was different to that of the other members of the Wali Sanga. Siti Jenar, who came from Campa (Note: Campa is either Čampā (more or less the actual Vietnam) or a place in Java. The latter seems more likely.), was influenced by Campa's traditions and emphasized the more mystical approach of sufism, called pantheist sufism (union of man and God, wujûdiyah, manunggaling kawulo gusti) - which opposed chariatic sufism. This brought out strong oppositions. Siti Jenar and his disciples Pangeran Jipang and Sunan Panggung (Pengging) were executed upon the order of either Ja’far Sadik or Sunan Kudus, hardliner islamist who was at that time at the head of religious affairs in Demak Sultanate. Politics dictated these executions: Jenar was perceived as an opponent to the political orientation of the sultanate. Theological dynamics were often influenced and/or interrupted by political interventions from one faction or another - and reciprocally. (Note: As an example of the mutual influence of politics and religion, two other members of the Wali Sanga opposed each other: Sunan Kudus, islamic hardliner of Arabic origin, supported the prince of Jipang; whereas Sunan Kalijaga (or Kalijogo), islamic moderate of Javanese origin, supported Sunan Prawoto. Sunan Kudus instigated that the prince of Jipang killed Sunan Prawoto; but the prince of Jipang was subsequently defeated by the founder of the new sultanate of Pajang, Joko Tingkir, and could not claim the throne of Demak. The sultan of Demak sent Kudus as ambassador to the small kingdom of Pengging, at the foot of Mount Merapi (Central Java), in an attempt to obtain the submission of the reigning prince who was an adept of Sheikh Siti Jenar. Facing obstinate refusals, Kudus had that prince killed. He is also the main accusator of two other religious masters: Sheikh Jangkung on the pretext that the latter wanted a mosk to be built without having received his permission, and Sheikh Maulana, a disciple of Sunan Gunung Jati whose doctrine diverged from that of Kudus. Then Kudus also had a tiff with the sultan of Demak about the beginning of Ramadam month. But as he had been defeated, he left Demak for Tajug and transformed that region in an islamic state in 1549.)

Dang Hyang Nirartha was also a student of his; he had a significant influence in the kingdom of Majapahit, the biggest Hindu kingdom in Nusantara, East Java; and later in Bali.

== See also ==
- Islam in Indonesia
- The spread of Islam in Indonesia

== See also ==
=== Bibliography ===
- Ardhana, I Ketut (2018). "Syekh Siti Jenar and Danghyang Nirartha: Historical Relation of Islam and Hindu in Java and Bali". In Sarjana, I Putu; Wibawa, I Putu Sastra (eds.). Tolerance and Pluralism in Southeast Asia (PDF) (International Seminar, October 2, 2018). Denpasar: Unhi Press. pp. 32-38 (see p. 33). ISBN 978-602-52255-7-4.
- Azra, Azyumardi (2006), Islam in the Indonesian World: An Account of Institutional Formation, Mizan Pustaka
- Headley, Stephen Cavanna (2004), Durga's Mosque: Cosmology, Conversion And Community in Central Javanese Islam, Institute of Southeast Asian Studies
- Nubowo, Andar (2023). La genèse d'un "islam du juste milieu" en Indonésie : histoire et portée de l'institutionnalisation d'une notion ambigüe [Genesis of a "golden mean islam" in Indonesia: history and scope of the institutionalisation of an ambiguous notion] (PDF) (phD in History) (in French). École normale supérieure de Lyon. pp. 30–31.
- Ricklefs, M.C. (1991). A History of Modern Indonesia since c.1300, 2nd Edition. London: MacMillan. pp. 9–10. ISBN 0-333-57689-6.
