= Arya Pangiri =

Duke of Demak

Arya Pangiri was the duke of Demak who succeeded in becoming the second king of the Pajang Sultanate, who ruled from 1583 to 1586 with the title of Sultan Awantipura. According to the Chinese chronicle of the Sam Po Kong Temple, Ja Tik Su (Sunan Kudus?) Appointed a prince from Mukming/Raden Mukmin as the King of Demak after the death of Mukming/Raden Mukmin who was killed.

== Origin ==
Arya Pangiri was the son of Sunan Prawoto, the fourth king of Demak, who was killed by Rangkuti, a Jipang soldier who was very loyal to Arya Penangsang in 1547. He was then raised by his aunt, Ratu Kalinyamat in Jepara.

Arya Penangsang, the fifth king of Demak, was later killed by rioters sent by Hadiwijaya, the duke of Pajang. Since then, Pajang has become a sovereign kingdom in which Demak is subordinate.

As and adult, Arya Pangiri was married to Ratu Pembayun, the eldest daughter of Sultan Hadiwijaya and became the duke of Demak.

== Libraries ==
- Andjar Any. 1979. "Secrets of the Jayabaya, Ranggawarsita & Sabdopalon Forecast". Semarang: Various Knowledge
- "Babad Tanah Jawi, Starting from Prophet Adam Until 1647". (trans.). 2007. Yogyakarta: Narration
- H.J.de Graaf and T.H. Pigeaud. 2001. "The First Islamic Empire in Java". trans. Jakarta: Graffiti Main Library
- Hayati et al. 2000. "The Role of Queen Kalinyamat in Japan in the XVI Century". Jakarta: National History Awareness Raising Project Directorate of History and Traditional Values Directorate General of Culture Ministry of National Education
- M.C. Ricklefs. 1991. "History of Modern Indonesia" (trans.). Yogyakarta: Gadjah Mada University Press
- Moedjianto. 1987. "The Concept of Javanese Power: Its Application by the King of Mataram". Yogyakarta: Kanisius
- Purwadi. 2007. "History of the king of Java". Yogyakarta: Science Media
