= Menara Kudus Mosque =

Mosque in Kudus, Central Java, Indonesia

- Masjid Menara Kudus
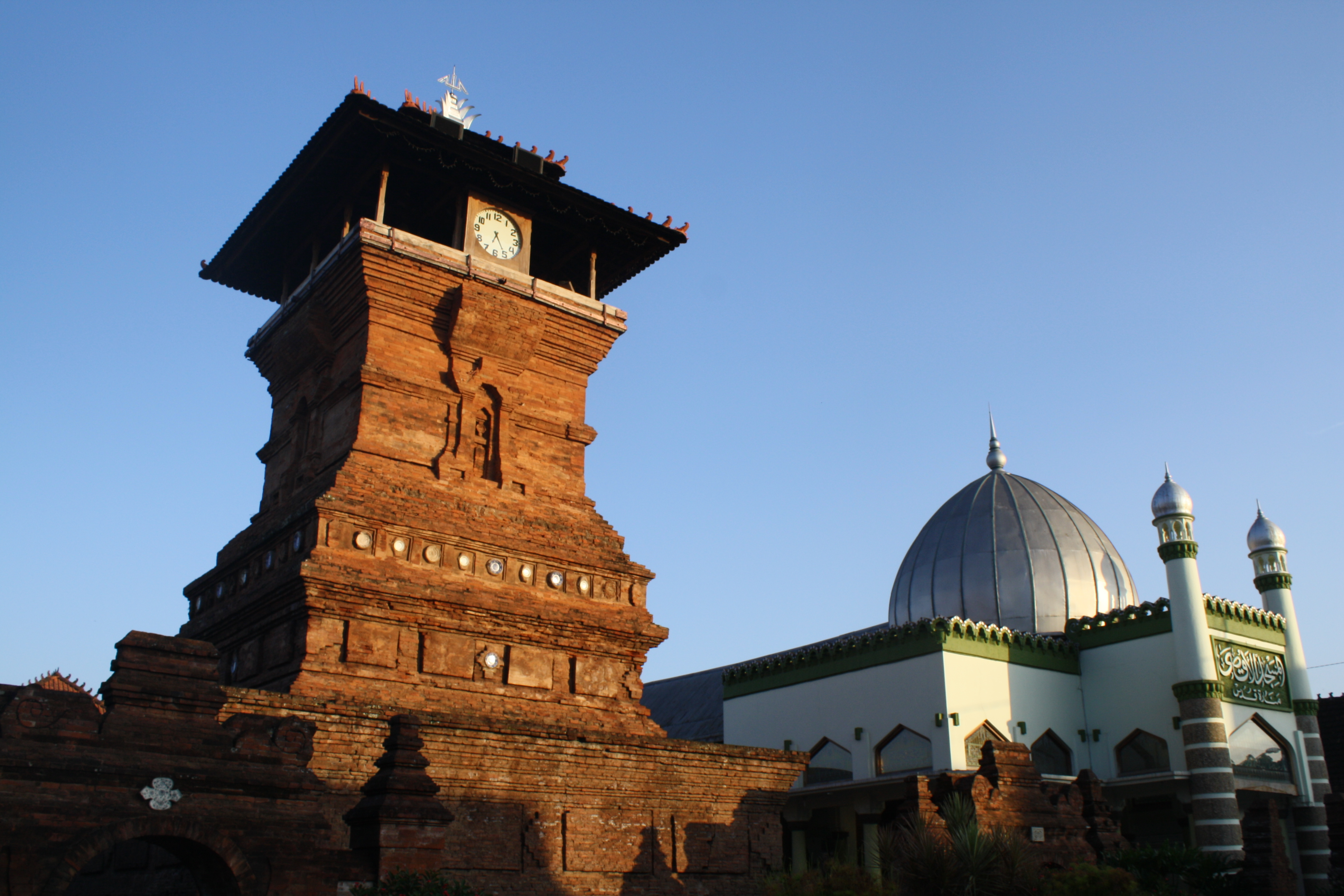

- Indonesia

Religion
- Affiliation: Islam
- Branch/tradition: Sunni

Location
- Location: Kudus, Central Java, Indonesia
- Interactive map of Menara Kudus Mosque
- Coordinates: 6°48′14″S 110°49′56″E

Architecture
- Type: Mosque
- Established: 1549

The Menara Kudus Mosque (Indonesian: Masjid Menara Kudus) or Al-Aqsha Mosque is located in Kudus in the Indonesian province of Central Java. Dating from 1549, it is one of the oldest mosques in Indonesia, built at the time of Islam's spread through Java. The mosque preserves the tomb of Sunan Kudus, one of the nine Islamic saints of Java (the Wali Sanga), and is a popular pilgrimage point.

== Architecture ==
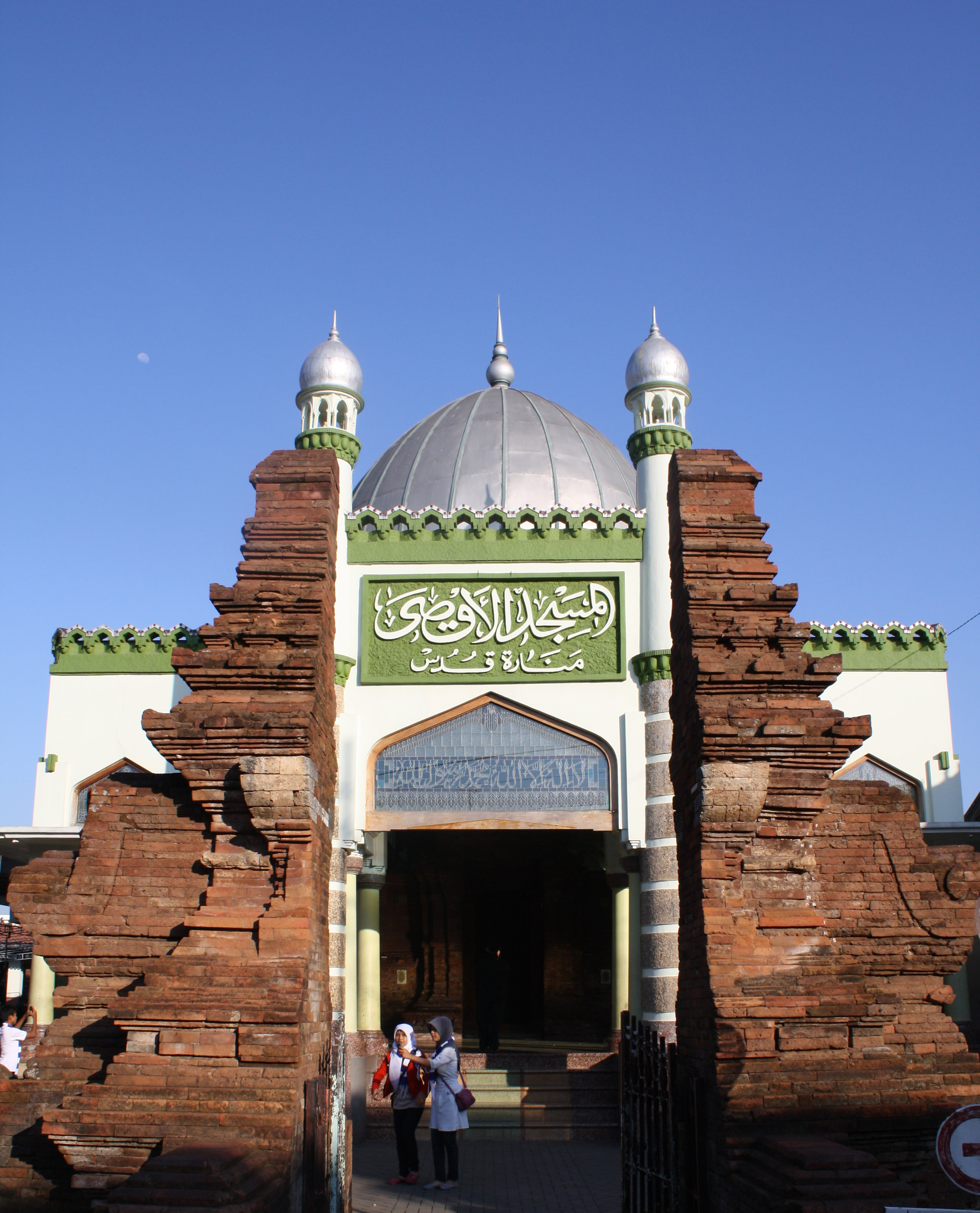
Gateway of Kudus Mosque

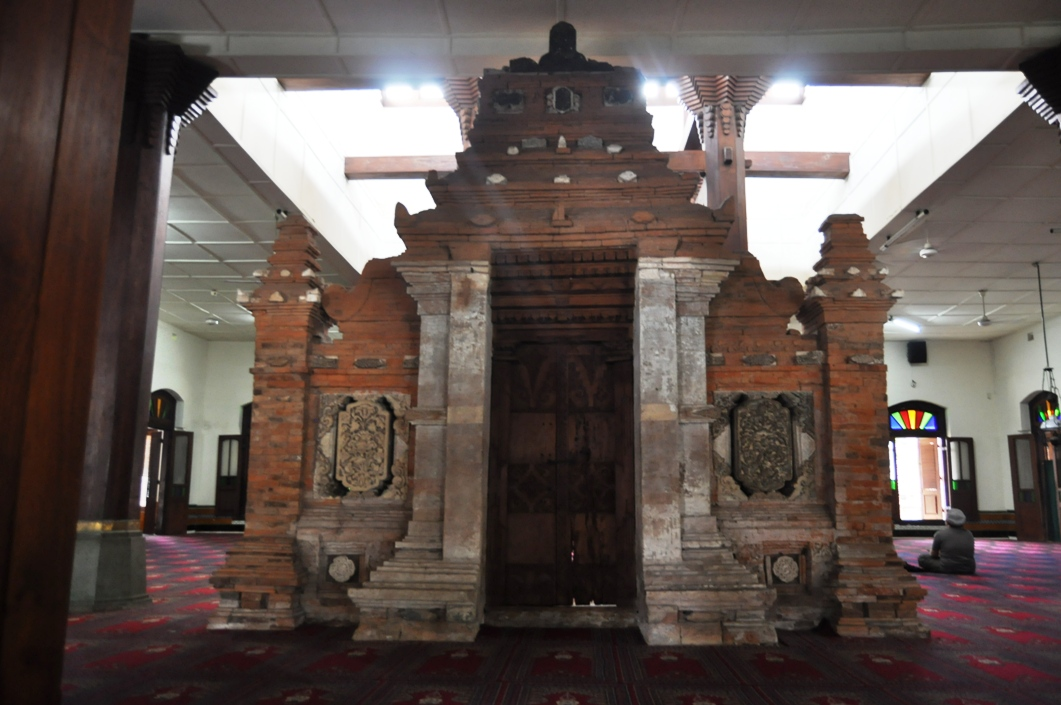
the interior of the main room

It preserves pre-Islamic architectural forms such as old Javanese split doorways, ancient Hindu-Buddhist-influenced Majapahit-style red brickwork, and a three-tired pyramidal roof. The most unusual feature is the brick minaret on which a pavilion shelters a large skin drum (bedug), which is used to summon the faithful to prayer instead of the more common muezzin. Whereas a bedug normally hangs under the eaves of a mosque veranda, in the Kudus Mosque it sits in a tower like a Balinese Hindu temple kul-kul or signal drum used to warn of an impending attack, fire, or communal event. No other mosque in Java is known to have a drum tower of this type.

In front of the minaret and around the compound are walls and gateways in the old candi bentar (split gate) and kori agung (main gate) styles. Inside are two gateways—a smaller, inner gate with relief panels on either side similar to those found in Mantingan, and an outer gate that is reminiscent of the 14th-century Bajang Ratu gate at Trowulan. Other pre-Islamic touches include 8 kala-head water spouts in the ablution area and Ming porcelain plates set in the walls.

The pre-Islamic elements suggest the complex has incorporated a pre-existing Hindu-Javanese structure. The mosque has been rebuilt several times removing evidence of what the original structure looked like. The Majapahit style gates, walls, and minaret that appear so incongruous today may have blended more harmoniously with the main structure (which probably had a meru roof supported by large pillars, as in Cirebon and Demak). The peaked roof is a 1920s renovation with terracotta tiles replacing wooden tiles, with glass windows inserted between the roof tiers. The roof is topped with a mastaka crown roof element. An inscription over the mihrab says the mosque was founded by Ja'far Shodiq in AH 956 (AD 1549). He is believed to be the venerated Sunan Kudus, one of the nine Islamic saints of Java (Wali Sanga) who lies buried in an elaborately carved mausoleum behind the mosque. The complex includes a Mogul-style mosque with a silvery onion dome and concrete pillars.

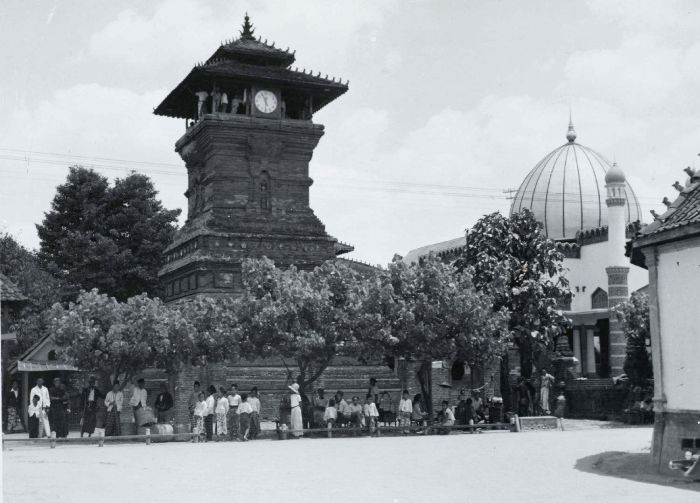
The tower and domed mosque main building.

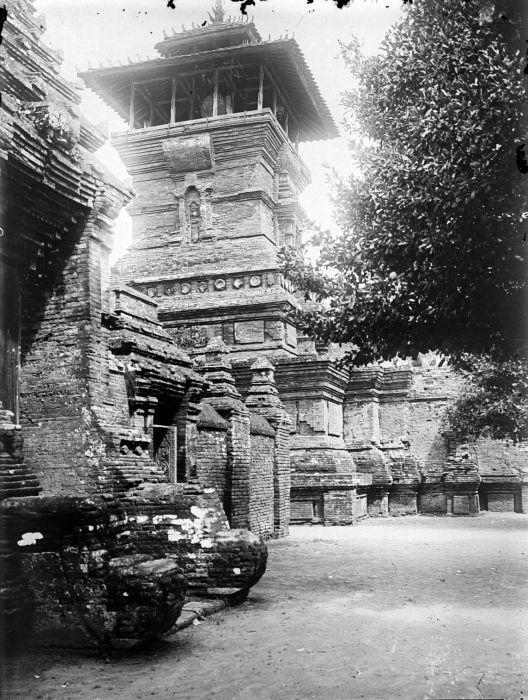
The bedug drum in the pavilion atop the menara (minaret).

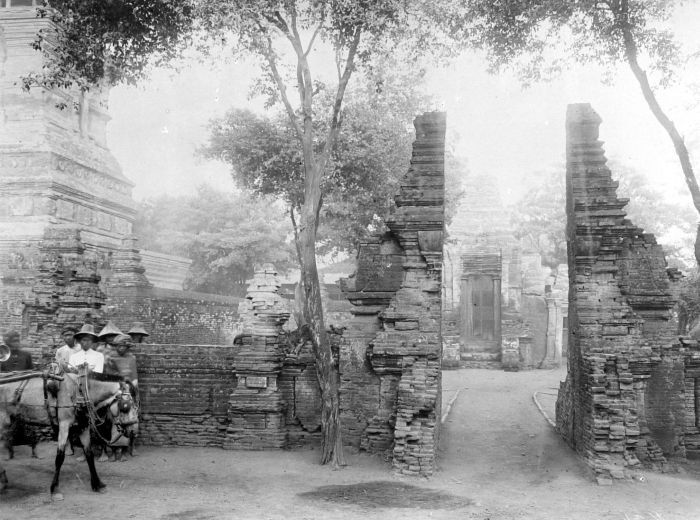
Majapahit style split gate and red brickwork

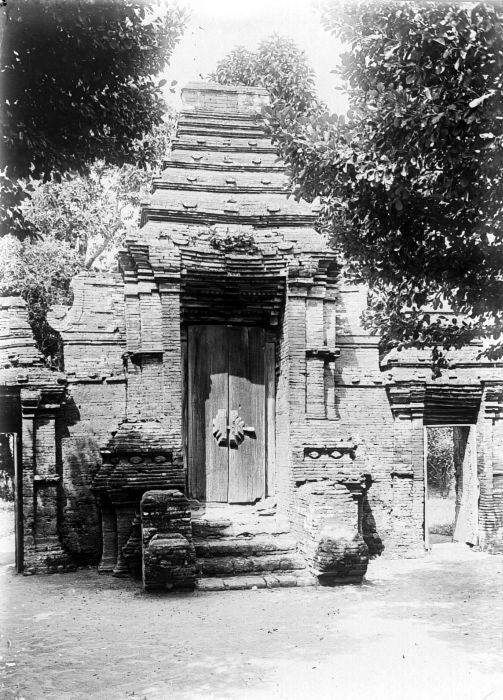
Mosque gate (Pintu gerbang)

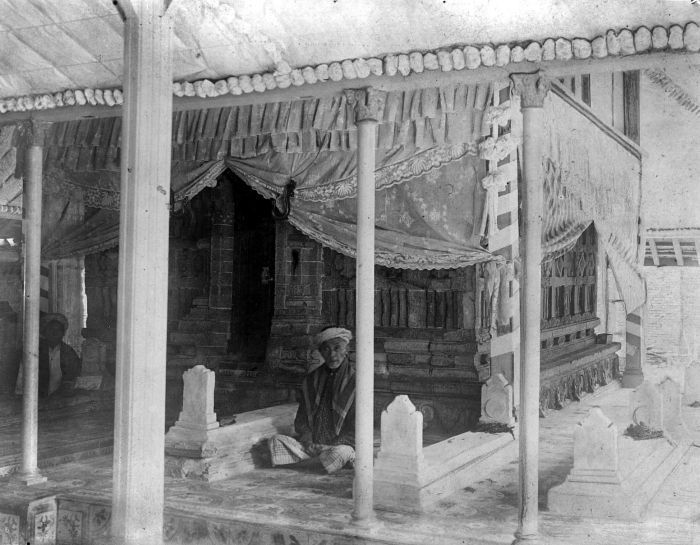
Cemetery (Makam)

== See also ==
- Indonesian architecture
- Mosques in Indonesia
