= Sunan Kudus =

One of nine Islamic saints in Java

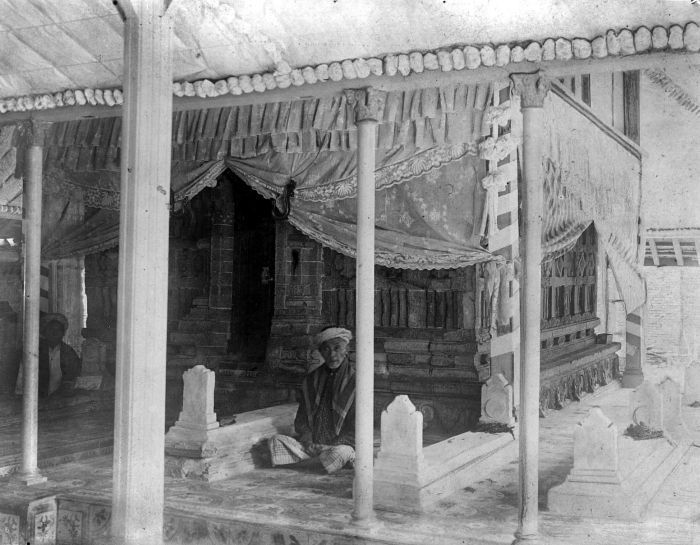
- The tomb of Sunan Kudus (wooden structure, background) in the Menara Kudus Mosque.
- Title: Wāli al-ʿilmi

Personal life
- Born: Jaʿfar al-Ṣādiq; 1500
- Died: 1550 (aged 49–50) Kudus, Indonesia; Demak Sultanate
- Buried: Menara Kudus Mosque

Religious life
- Religion: Islam
- Denomination: Sunni (Sufi)
- Jurisprudence: Itjihad
- Creed: Atharī
- Movement: Wali Sanga

Muslim leader
- Influenced by: Sunan Ampel, Ibn al-Qayyim al-Jawziyyah
- Influenced: Trenggana

Sunan Kudus (Jawi: سونن قدوس), real name Jaʿfar al-Ṣādiq (1500–1550) was an Islamic scholar and statesman of the Demak Sultanate. He was a member of the Wali Sanga, a group of nine Islamic missionaries that spread Islam to Indonesia. Sunan Kudus is attributed with the introduction of wayang golek puppetry to West Java, as well as the construction of the Menara Kudus Mosque where his tomb is located.

== Biography ==
Sunan Kudus, whose real name was Jaʿfar al-Ṣādiq, was born in the year 1500. He was the grandson of ʿAlī Murtaḍā, a prince from the Burji dynasty who emigrated to Java, while his father Sunan Ngudung served as a commander in the army of the Demak Sultanate during the rule of Raden Patah, the first Sultan of Demak. Legendary tales had been narrated about the early life of Sunan Kudus, including claims of his birth in Jerusalem.

His teachers included his own father, as well as the local scholar Sunan Ampel. As a member of the Wali Sanga, his missionary work continued into the rest of the predominately Hindu and Buddhist region of West Java with the support and assistance of the Demak Sultanate. He also travelled to Mecca to complete the Hajj pilgrimage, as well as visited the city of Jerusalem for further education and religious guidance. Due to his influence on the Javanese populace, he was nicknamed Sunan Kudus. He was also renowned for his fatwa where he prevented the slaughter of cows in public spaces, out of respect for the Hindu populations.

Kudus founded the Menara Kudus Mosque in 1549, which was converted from an abandoned Hindu temple. He died in 1550 and was buried in the cemetery behind the mosque, where a mausoleum was built around his grave.

=== Religious and political conflicts ===
Sunan Kudus, unlike the other missionaries in Java contemporary to his time, adhered to an orthodox form of Islamic jurisprudence and Sufism which was strictly based on the Islamic shari'at. He was reportedly influenced by the teachings of the Hanbali jurist Ibn al-Qayyim al-Jawziyyah, whose writings espoused a strict adherence to the Qur'an and Islamic shari'at, as well as support of Sufism and the Athari theology. Hence, Kudus opposed his fellow Wali Sanga member, Sunan Kalijaga, the latter who had a more moderate approach to the Islamic religion and missionary work towards Hindus and Buddhists.

As a statesman of the Demak Sultanate, Sunan Kudus requested the execution of Sunan Sitijenar and his disciples, to which the reigning Sultan of Demak agreed. This was due to the fact that Sitijenar preached the doctrine of Wahdat al-Wujud, which was considered heretical and pantheistic by the conservative Kudus. After the death of Trenggana, a civil war between the princes Arya Penangsang and Raden Mukmin emerged, to claim the throne of Demak, with Sunan Kudus supporting the former and Sunan Kalijaga supporting the latter. With the assistance of Kudus, Arya was able to assassinate Mukmin and was appointed the de facto Sultan of Demak, although he would be killed in 1568 by Joko Tingkir, the founder of the Sultanate of Pajang.

Kudus was also sent as an ambassador to Pengging, a small kingdom at Mount Merapi which adhered to the doctrine of Wahdat al-Wujud. After the ruler of Pengging refused to accept the suzerainty of the Demak Sultanate and continued to preach Wahdat al-Wujud, Kudus had the ruler executed.

== Legacy ==
Sunan Kudus is traditionally regarded as the founder of wayang golek, a form of puppet art that is an integral part of Sundanese culture. However, the tradition of wayang golek has been dated to 1584, hence making it unlikely that Kudus, who died in 1550, created this form of art. Other variations of the origin story replace the mention of Kudus with an unspecified Sunan Suci.

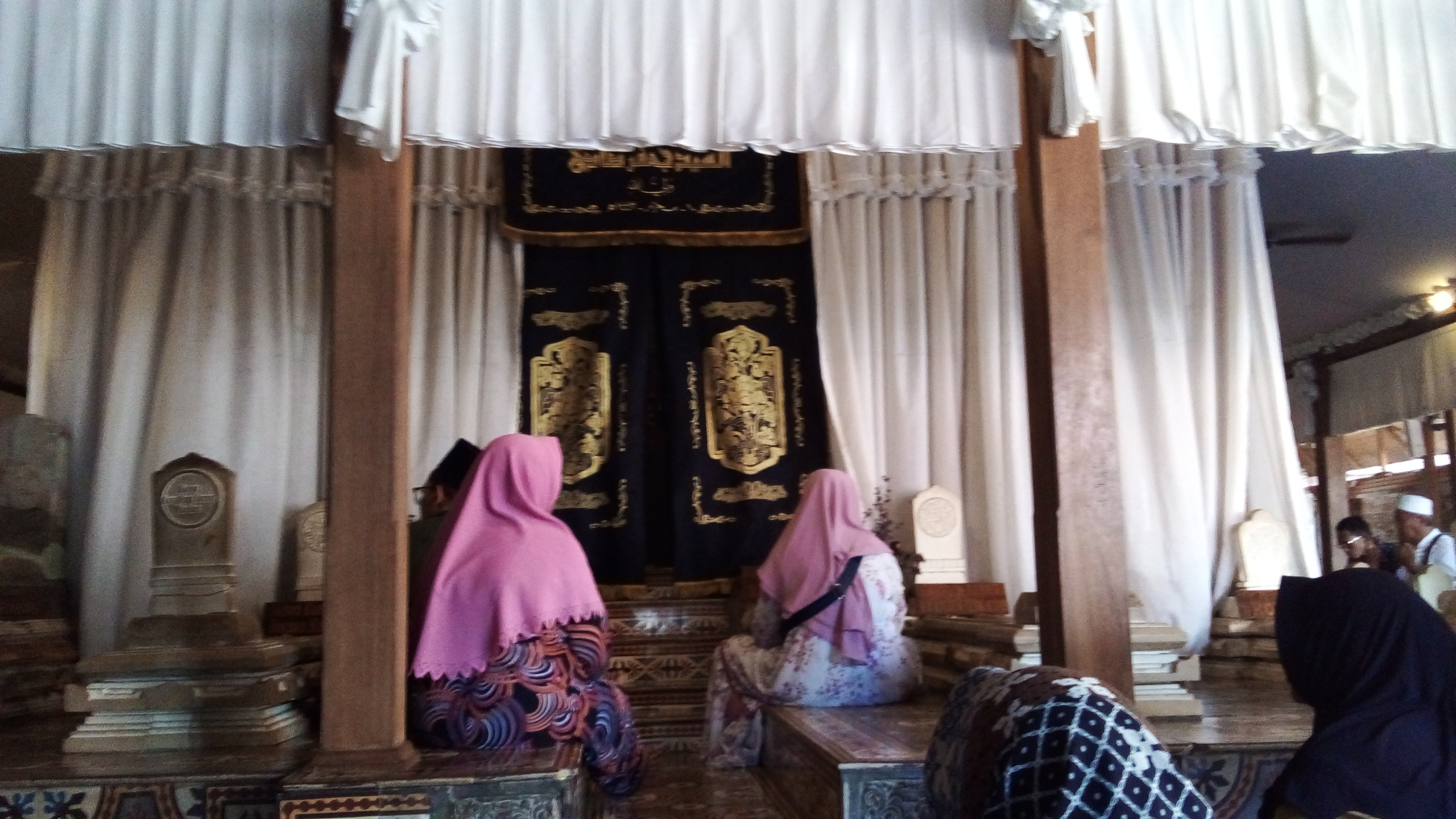
The tomb of Sunan Kudus behind the mosque he founded attracts visitors from different places apart from Indonesia.

The tomb of Sunan Kudus behind the Menara Kudus Mosque is a popular site for religious tourism, especially with the purpose of ziyarat. His tomb attracts visitors from all over Indonesia, as well as visitors from Malaysia, Singapore and even Australia.

== See also ==
- Wali Sanga
- Islam in Indonesia
