= Sumatran Numismatic Museum =

Museum in Aceh Jaya, Indonesia

Coordinates: 4.62427°N 95.61686°E

- Museum Uang Sumatera
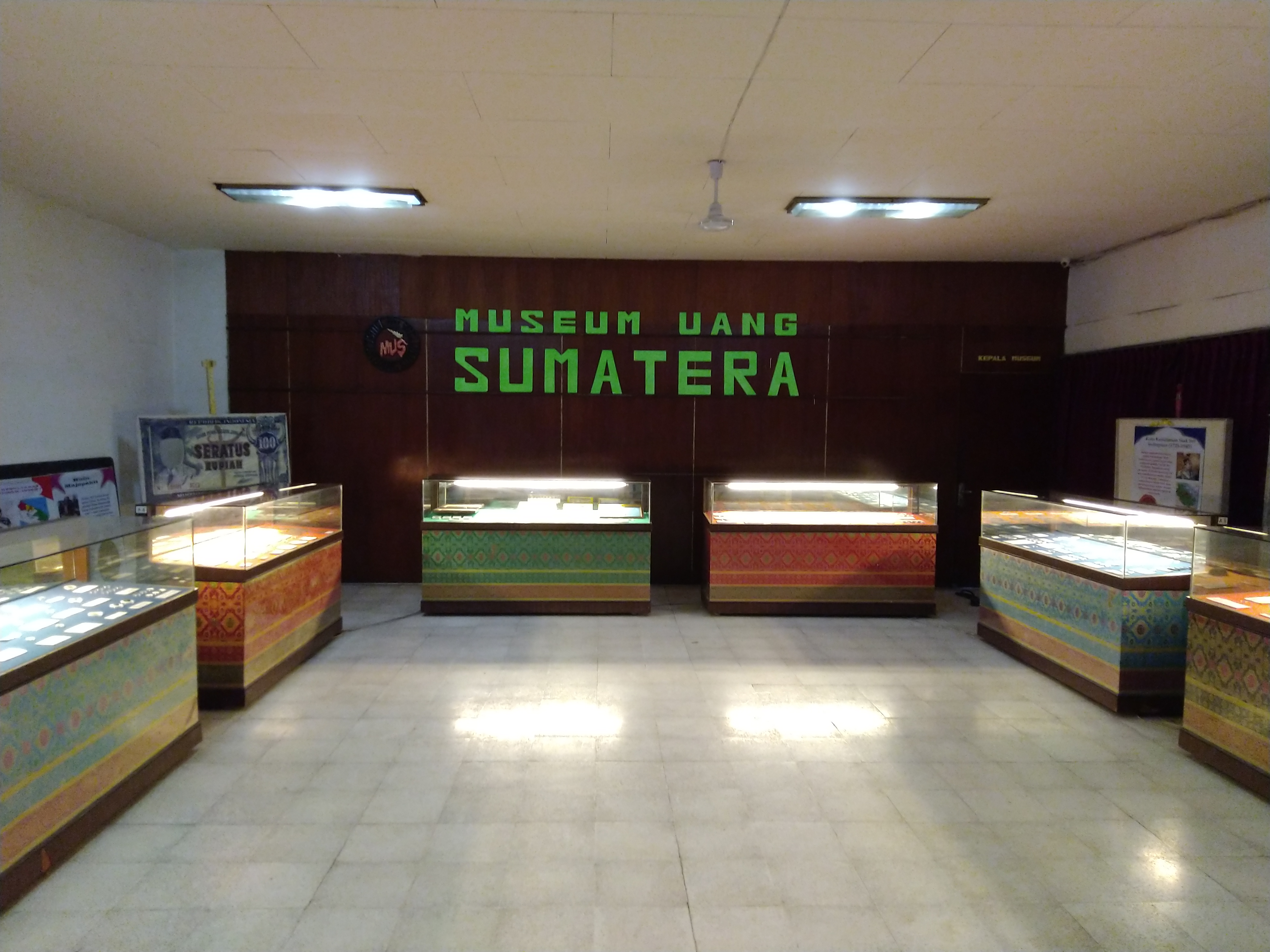
- Established: 2017
- Location: Medan, North Sumatra, Indonesia
- Founder: Saparudin Barus

The Sumatran Numismatic Museum (Indonesian: Museum Uang Sumatera) is a museum located in Medan, Indonesia. Established in 2017, the museum is dedicated to the history of money in Indonesia and houses a significant collection of objects.

== Description ==
The museum was established in 2017 by Saparudin Barus, an avid collector. The museum's extensive collection contains objects from historical nations located in Southeast Asia, coins from the Dutch colonial period and Dutch East Indies, and from modern-day Indonesia. Artifacts include coins, stamps, tokens, coupons, and paper money.
