= Sunan Kalijaga =

One of nine Islamic saints in Java

Kangjeng Susuhunan Kalijaga
- Born: Raden Mas Said; 1450; Tuban, Majapahit
- Died: 1513 (aged 62–63); Kadilangu, Demak
- Era: Majapahit, Demak Sultanate, Kingdom of Pajang, Mataram Sultanate, Cirebon Sultanate, Banten Sultanate
- Employer: Sultanate of Demak
- Organization: Walisongo
- Title: Kangjeng Susuhunan Kalijaga
- Father: Tumenggung Wilatikta

Sunan Kalijaga (born Raden Mas Said; 1450–1513) was one of the "nine saints" of Javanese Islam (Wali Sanga). The "Kalijaga" title was derived from an orchard known as "Kalijaga" in Cirebon. Other accounts suggest that the name derives from his hobby of submerging himself in Kali ("river" in Javanese). Others note that the name Kalijaga derived its nature from the Arabic notion of qadli dzaqa which means "holy leader" in the sultanate.

== Names ==
Sunan Kalijaga was known by the following names and titles:

- Raden Said
- Lokajaya
- Syaikh Melaya
- Raden Abdurrahman
- Pangeran (prince) Tuban
- Ki Dalang Sida Brangti
- Ki Dalang Bengkok
- Ki Dalang Kumendung
- Ki Unehan
- Pangeran (prince) Santi Kusuma

== Life ==
Sunan Kalijaga was a close friend of Sunan Gunungjati and is said to have lived to the age of 100. He witnessed the downfall of Majapahit, the kingdoms of Demak, Cirebon, Banten, and Pajang in 1546.

Among his missionary activities (dawah), he built two mosques, Masjid Agung Cirebon and Masjid Agung Demak. His main mentor was Sunan Bonang, another of the Wali Sanga. Kalijaga's beliefs and teaching are more sufistic than salaf, applying arts and culture as a medium for his dawah. He was also tolerant of local tradition. His exegesis from the Quranic perspective led him to believe that people will keep away from dakwah if their personality is questioned. In this premise, one should consider a step-by-step approach to his people by the principle of following yet influencing. To him, if Islam was truly or fully understood, then people would gradually give up their old habits that contravened Islamic teachings.

This method can be seen in Indonesian artworks, particularly in carvings, shadow puppets (wayang kulit), gamelan (Javanese traditional musical performance), and singing. From this idea, he popularized Baju Takwa (a traditional dress custom for Indonesian Moslem), Sekaten (a festivity), and Grebeg Maulud, amongst others.

Sunan Kalijaga was buried in Kadilangu southeast of Demak.

== Babad Tanah Jawi ==
In the Babad Tanah Jawi, a chronicle of large Javanese manuscripts, there are no formal signs of Sunan Kalijaga's conversion to Islam so it is not clear if Kalijaga was already Muslim at the time of his "conversion". In this legend, he is said to be the son of Tumenggung Wilatikta, and in the service of the Majapahit empire, and Kalijaga whose religion is unspecified but has the Arabic name "Said". Following gambling losses, Said resorts to highway robbery on the north coast of Java. Sunan Bonang one day passes and is pulled up by Said. Sunan Bonang suggests it would be better for Said to rob a person who will later pass dressed in blue with a red hibiscus behind his ear. Three days later, this person passes and is Bonang in disguise. Said attacks, but Bonang turns himself into four persons, traumatising Said such that he becomes an ascetic. He takes the name "Kalijaga", becomes a wali, and marries the sister of Sunan Giri.

== Legacy ==
Kalijaga has been remembered as a quintessential example of the perceived flexibility of Indonesian Muslims, with anthropologist Clifford Geertz stating that he was seen as "malleable, tentative, syncretistic, and, most significantly of all, multivoiced".

== See also ==
- Islam in Indonesia
- The spread of Islam in Indonesia
