= Joko Tingkir =

Sultan of Pajang (1549–1582)

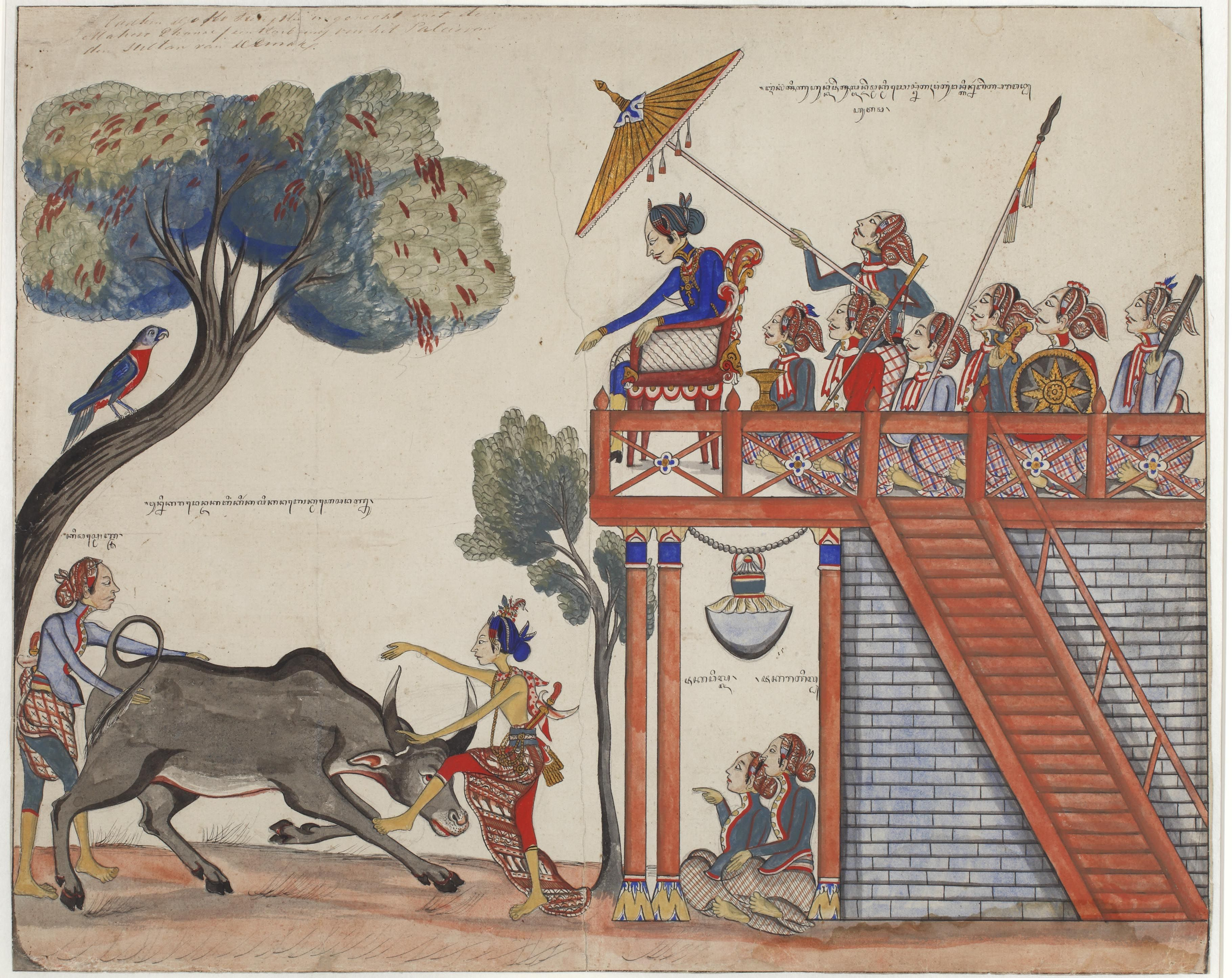
- Javanese classical painting, Jaka Tingkir killing a buffalo under watch of the Sultan of Demak (probably Sultan Trenggana).

King of Pajang
- Reign: 1549–1582
- Successor: Sultan Prabuwijaya
- Born: Mas Karèbèt
- Died: 1582; Kingdom of Pajang
- Spouse: Queen Mas Cempaka
- Issue: Sultan Prabuwijaya; Queen Glampok Raras; Princess Sekar Kedhaton
Regnal name
- Sultan Adiwijaya
- Father: Ki Ageng Pengging
- Mother: Nyi Ratu Mandoko

Joko Tingkir, or sometimes written as Jaka Tingkir, is the founder and the first king of the Sultanate of Pajang. He ruled from 1549 to 1582. He is also known by the title of Sultan Adiwijaya.

== Ancestry ==
Joko was the son of Ki Ageng Pengging, born as Mas Karèbèt. When he was conceived, his father was having a wayang beber (shadow puppet) show performed by the dalang Ki Ageng Tingkir. Both were followers of Syekh Siti Jenar (the 10th saint of Java). Afterwards, Ki Ageng Tingkir died of an illness.

Ten years later, Ki Ageng Pengging was sentenced to capital punishment for rebellion against the Sultanate of Demak with Sunan Kudus as the executioner. After her husband's execution, Nyai Ageng Pengging also fell ill and died. Mas Karèbèt was then cared for by Nyai Ageng Tingkir, the widow of Ki Ageng Tingkir.

When he grew up, he became widely known as Jaka Tingkir. He followed the teaching of Sunan Kalijaga as well as Ki Ageng Sela. He was also considered to be related to the three grandsons of Ki Ageng Tingkir, Ki Juru Martani, Ki Ageng Pemanahan, and Ki Panjawi.
