= Kingdom of Pajang =

Short-lived Muslim state in Java

Coordinates: 7°34′27″S 110°47′08″E

Pajang كسلطانن ڤاجڠ Kasultanan Pajang
- 1568^{1}–1586
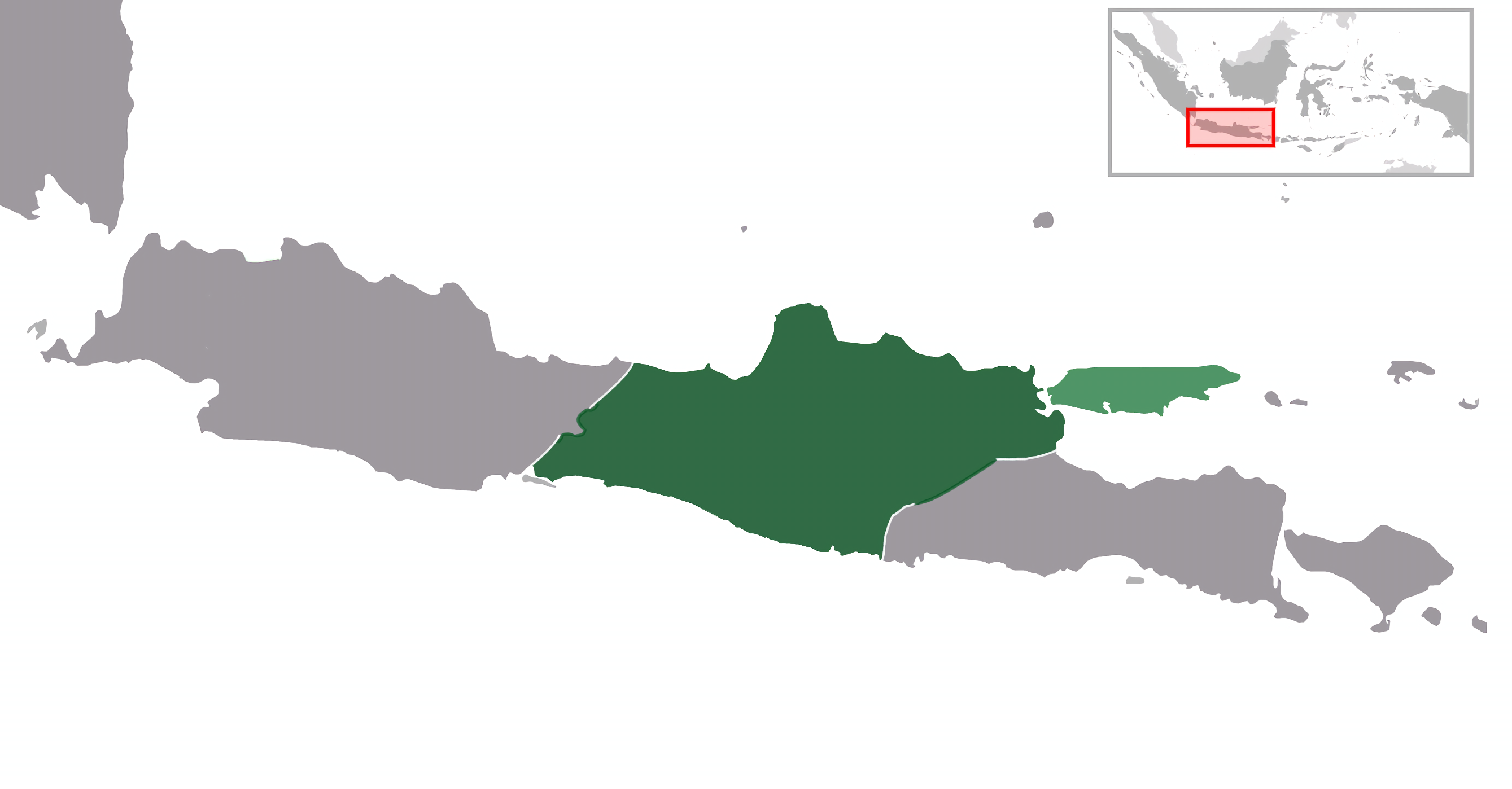
- The Pajang Kingdom at its greatest extent under Adiwijaya.
- Capital: Pajang
- Common languages: Javanese
- Religion: Islam
- Government: Monarchy
- Sultan
  - 1568–1583^{1}: Adiwijaya
  - 1583-1586: Arya Pangiri
  - 1586-1587: Prince Benawa
- History
  - Adiwijaya assumes throne: 1568
  - Transfer of power to Mataram: 1586
Preceded by	Succeeded by
Demak Sultanate	Mataram Sultanate
- ^1 (1548-1568 was interregnum due to various claimants after death of the last Demak ruler, King Trenggana of Demak Kingdom)

The Kingdom of Pajang or Sultanate of Pajang (Javanese using Pegon: كسلطانن ڤاجڠ; 1568–1586) was a short-lived Muslim state in Java. It was established by Adiwijaya or Jaka Tingkir, Lord of Boyolali, after a civil war and was a successor to Sultanate of Demak. Adiwijaya claimed to be a descendant of Brawijaya V, the last king of the Majapahit empire, and Trenggana, the sultan of Demak.

Pajang is based in Central Java as a continuation of the Demak Sultanate. The palace complex at this time only remains in the form of the boundaries of its foundations which are on the border of Pajang Village - Surakarta and Makamhaji Village, Kartasura, Sukoharjo.

In the last battle against the last claimant of Demak, the vicious Arya Penangsang, Jaka Tingkir commissioned his greatest vassal, Ki Ageng Pamanahan, and his son, Sutawijaya, to destroy Arya Penangsang's army. The two managed to defeat and kill Arya Penangsang and were thus awarded a fief in a forest called Alas Mentaok, now Kotagede, on which they founded their base for the future capital of Mataram Kingdom.

Legend says King Adiwijaya was so fond of Sutawijaya, that he adopted him as the playmate of his heir, Prince Banawa. Adiwijaya's rule was supposed to be succeeded by this weak-minded heir, but a rebellion by a vassal named Ario Pangiri forced the prince to seek asylum from his childhood friend Sutawijaya.

Pledged to help, Sutawijaya gathered his army defeated Ario Pangiri, and seized the Pajang Palace. Prince Banawa then submitted his crown to Sutawijaya and thus ended the Kingdom of Pajang in 1586, when Sutawijaya founded the greatest Islamic kingdom in Java: Mataram Sultanate.

== Origin ==
The name of the land of Pajang has been known since the time of the Majapahit Empire. According to Nagarakretagama, written in 1365, at that time the younger sister of Hayam Wuruk (the king of Majapahit at that time) whose real name was Dyah Nertaja served as the ruler of Pajang, had the title Bhatara i Pajang, or abbreviated as Bhre Pajang. Dyah Nertaja is the mother of Wikramawardhana (the heir of Majapahit at the time).

Based on the babad scripts, the Pengging country is called the forerunner of Pajang. The legendary folklore mentions that Pengging was an ancient kingdom that was once led by Prabu Anglingdriya, the arch-enemy of Prabu Baka, the king of Prambanan. This story is with the fairy tale of the founding of the Prambanan Temple.

When Majapahit was led by Brawijaya V (the last king written in the babad texts), the name Pengging reappeared. It is said that Brawijaya V's daughter, Retno Ayu Pembayun, was kidnapped by Menak Daliputih, the king of Blambangan, the son of Menak Jingga. A hero named Jaka Sengara appears who manages to seize the princess and kill the kidnapper.

For his services, Jaka Sengara was appointed by Brawijaya as the Pengging regent (bupati) and married Retno Ayu Pembayun. He then was given the title Andayaningrat.

== Early history ==
The Kingdom of Panjang is seen as the first kingdom that emerged in the interior of Java after the collapse of the Muslim kingdom in the Pasisir, or the northern coastal region of Java.

According to the babad scripts, Andayaningrat died at the hands of Sunan Ngudung during the war between the Majapahit Empire and the Demak Sultanate. He was later replaced by his son, whose name was Raden Kebo Kenanga, with the title Ki Ageng Pengging. Since then Pengging has been the subordinate area of the Demak Kingdom.

Several years later Ki Ageng Pengging was sentenced to death because he was accused of trying to rebel against the Demak Sultanate. His son, who had the title Jaka Tingkir, when he was an adult, actually served Demak.

Jaka Tingkir's brilliant achievements in the army made him appointed as Trenggana's son-in-law and became the regent (bupati) of Pajang with the title Adiwijaya. The Pajang area at that time covered the Pengging area (now roughly covering Boyolali and Klaten), Tingkir (the Salatiga area), Butuh, and its surroundings.

After the death of Trenggana in 1546, then Sunan Prawata took the throne. However, Sultan Prawata was killed by his cousin, Arya Penangsang, the regent (bupati) of Jipang in 1547. After that, Arya Penangsang tried to kill Adiwijaya but failed.

With the support of Ratu Kalinyamat (the regent (bupati) of Jepara and daughter of Trenggana), Adiwijaya and his followers succeeded in defeating Arya Penangsang. Adiwijaya then seized the throne of Demak and founded the Kingdom of Pajang.

== See also ==
- The spread of Islam in Indonesia (1200 to 1600)
- List of monarchs of Java
