= Arya Penangsang =

Sultan of Demak (1549–1554)

- Arya Jipang
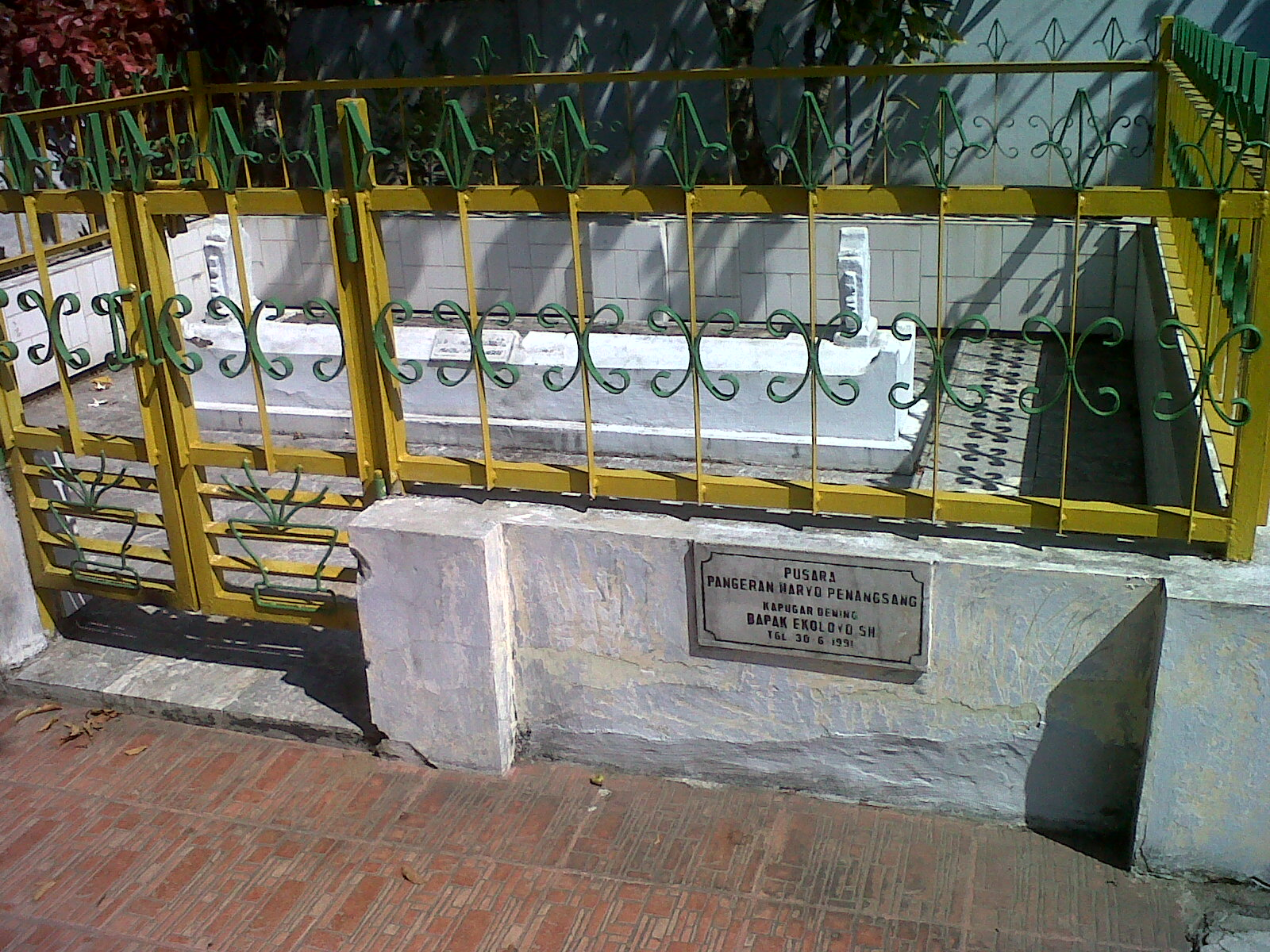
- Tomb of Arya Penangsang

Sultan of Demak
- Reign: 1549–1554
- Predecessor: Sunan Prawoto
- Successor: Sultan Hadiwijaya (founder of Pajang sultanate )
- Born: Arya Penangsang; 1505; Jipang, Cepu, Blora, Sultanate of Demak
- Died: 1554 (aged 48–49); Sultanate of Demak
- Religion: Islam

Arya Penangsang was king of the Sultanate of Demak between 1549 and 1554.

In 1521 the husband of Raden Patah's first daughter, Pati Unus attacked the Portuguese in Malacca but died in the war. It is said that Trenggana, the younger brother, fought for the throne.

Prince Surowiyoto or Raden Kikin had two sons named Raden Arya Panangsang and Arya Mataram, while Trenggana had a first son named Raden Mukmin also known as Sunan Prawoto. Mukmin is said to have killed Raden Kikin after Friday prayers on the banks of a river in Lasem using the kris Kyai Setan Kober which made Trenggana the third Sultan of Demak.

After Raden Kikin's death, Arya Panangsang succeeded in his father's position as Duke of Jipang. At that time he was 16 years old, so his government was assisted by Patih Mat Ahun (Mentaun). Arya Panangsang was only made proper ruler four years later in 1525, at 20 years old.

Trenggana ascended the throne of Demak in 1521. His reign ended when he died in Panarukan, Situbondo in 1546 while trying to attack the Portuguese again to continue the struggle of Pati Unus.

In 1554 Arya Panangsang was killed by the Adipati Pajang's messenger troops. With the death of Arya Panangsang, the power of the Demak Sultanate collapsed and the Kingdom of Pajang would soon be established.

== Sources and further reading ==
- Olthof, W. L. (2007). Babad Tanah Jawi, Mulai dari Nabi Adam Sampai Tahun 1647. Yogyakarta: Narasi. ISBN 9789791681629.
- de Graff, H.J.; Pigeaud, TH. G. TH. (2019). Kerajaan Islam Pertama di Jawa: Tinjauan Sejarah Politik Abad XV dan XVI, cetakan V edisi revisi. Yogyakarta: MataBangsa. ISBN 9789799471239.
- Hayati, Chusnul (2000). Peranan Ratu Kalinyamat di jepara pada Abad XVI (PDF). Jakarta: Proyek Peningkatan Kesadaran Sejarah Nasional Direktorat Sejarah dan Nilai Tradisional Direktorat Jenderal Kebudayaan Departemen Pendidikan Nasional.
- Ricklefs, M.C. (2008). A History of Modern Indonesia since c. 1200. New York: Palgrave MacMillan. ISBN 9780230546868.
- Moedjianto, G. (1987). Konsep Kekuasaan Jawa: Penerapannya oleh Raja-raja Mataram. Yogyakarta: Kanisius. ISBN 9780230546868.
- Manuskrip Jipang
