= Demak, Demak =

Town in Central Java, Indonesia

Coordinates: 6°53′S 110°38′E

Demak is a town and an administrative district (kecamatan) in Central Java Province of Indonesia. It is the capital of Demak Regency and was the location of the former Sultanate of Demak, the first Muslim state on Java and briefly the strongest power on the island of Java in the early 16th century. The district covers an area of 61.13 km^{2}, and had a population of 110,165 at the 2020 Census; the official estimate as of mid-2023 was 115,115 - comprising 57,699 males and 57,416 females.

== Administrative Villages ==
Demak District is divided into the following nineteen towns and villages (six of which have the status of urban kelurahan - indicated by an asterisk after their name in the following table - and thirteen with the status of rural desa), tabulated below with their areas and their populations according to the mid-2023 official estimates, together with their postcodes.

| Kode Wilayah | Name | Area (km^{2}) | Pop'n Estimate mid 2023 | Post code |
|---|---|---|---|---|
| 33.21.11.2001 | Bolo | 2.39 | 4,230 | 59517 |
| 33.21.11.2002 | Bango | 3.30 | 6,897 | 59517 |
| 33.21.11.2003 | Kedondong | 2.71 | 5,302 | 59517 |
| 33.21.11.2004 | Sedo | 4.37 | 3,331 | 59517 |
| 33.21.11.2005 | Mulyorejo | 3.42 | 4,775 | 59517 |
| 33.21.11.2006 | Turirejo | 6.28 | 8,615 | 59517 |
| 33.21.11.2007 | Raji | 4.14 | 4,901 | 59517 |
| 33.21.11.2008 | Cabean | 3.54 | 7,714 | 59517 |
| 33.21.11.2009 | Tempuran | 1.84 | 3,990 | 59517 |
| 33.21.11.2010 | Karangmlati | 3.37 | 4,600 | 59517 |
| 33.21.11.2011 | Katonsari | 2.52 | 7,331 | 59516 |
| 33.21.11.2012 | Kalikondang | 3.46 | 7,047 | 59517 |
| 33.21.11.2013 | Donorejo | 2.33 | 4,111 | 59517 |
| 33.21.11.1014 | Mangunjiwan * | 4.77 | 9,322 | 59515 |
| 33.21.11.1015 | Kalicilik * | 2.52 | 3,602 | 59514 |
| 33.21.11.1016 | Singorejo * | 0.87 | 1,626 | 59513 |
| 33.21.11.1017 | Betokan * | 2.12 | 5,285 | 59512 |
| 33.21.11.1018 | Bintoro * | 5.43 | 18,646 | 59511 |
| 33.21.11.1019 | Kadilangu * | 2.18 | 3,790 | 59517 |
| Totals | Demak District | 61.56 | 115,115 | |

== Climate ==
Demak has a tropical monsoon climate (Am) with moderate to little rainfall from May to October and heavy to very heavy rainfall from November to April.

Climate data for Demak
| Month | Jan | Feb | Mar | Apr | May | Jun | Jul | Aug | Sep | Oct | Nov | Dec | Year |
|---|---|---|---|---|---|---|---|---|---|---|---|---|---|
| Mean daily maximum °C (°F) | 30.8 (87.4) | 30.7 (87.3) | 31.0 (87.8) | 32.0 (89.6) | 32.0 (89.6) | 32.2 (90.0) | 32.5 (90.5) | 33.4 (92.1) | 34.2 (93.6) | 34.2 (93.6) | 33.2 (91.8) | 31.9 (89.4) | 32.3 (90.2) |
| Daily mean °C (°F) | 26.4 (79.5) | 26.4 (79.5) | 26.5 (79.7) | 27.2 (81.0) | 27.1 (80.8) | 26.7 (80.1) | 26.2 (79.2) | 26.8 (80.2) | 27.5 (81.5) | 28.0 (82.4) | 27.9 (82.2) | 27.0 (80.6) | 27.0 (80.6) |
| Mean daily minimum °C (°F) | 22.0 (71.6) | 22.2 (72.0) | 22.1 (71.8) | 22.4 (72.3) | 22.2 (72.0) | 21.2 (70.2) | 20.0 (68.0) | 20.2 (68.4) | 20.9 (69.6) | 21.9 (71.4) | 22.6 (72.7) | 22.1 (71.8) | 21.7 (71.0) |
| Average rainfall mm (inches) | 471 (18.5) | 360 (14.2) | 276 (10.9) | 191 (7.5) | 121 (4.8) | 64 (2.5) | 45 (1.8) | 40 (1.6) | 54 (2.1) | 122 (4.8) | 216 (8.5) | 332 (13.1) | 2,292 (90.3) |
Source: Climate-Data.org
