= Trenggana =

Sultan of Demak (1521–1546)

Trenggana (1521–1546), also called Trenggono, was the third Sultan of Demak after he succeeded Pati Unus.

Sultan Trenggana was crowned by Sunan Gunungjati, one of the Wali Songo who spread Islam in Java. He became the third and greatest ruler of Demak. Because of his coronation, Trenggana is now referred to as "sultan", but this Arabic title was given to him by later generations. Trenggana conquered the Hindu empires of Central Java.

After the discovery of the Portuguese-Sundanese alliance directed against Demak, Trenggana ordered the invasion of Banten and Sunda Kelapa, ports of the Kingdom of Sunda, in 1527. The city of Sunda Kelapa was later renamed Jayakarta. He made these territories the new sultanate of Banten, a vassal state of Demak under the reign of Hasanudin.

Trenggana spread Demak's influence eastwards and during his reign he conquered the remains of the last Javanese Hindu-Buddhist state, the once mighty Majapahit. Majapahit's heirlooms were brought to Demak and adopted as royal treasures of the Kraton of Demak. On Java, thrones, crowns and objects such as krises. Demak was able to Islamize and subjugate other major ports of the interior of East Java. Trenggana's campaigns ended when he was killed in Panarukan in East Java in 1546.

== Sources ==
- Miksic, John (general ed.), et al. (2006) Karaton Surakarta. A look into the court of Surakarta Hadiningrat, central Java (First published: 'By the will of His Serene Highness Paku Buwono XII'. Surakarta: Yayasan Pawiyatan Kabudayan Karaton Surakarta, 2004) Marshall Cavendish Editions Singapore ISBN 981-261-226-2
