= Blora Regency =

Regency in Central Java, Indonesia

Blora Regency Kabupaten Blora, Kabupatèn Blora
- Regency
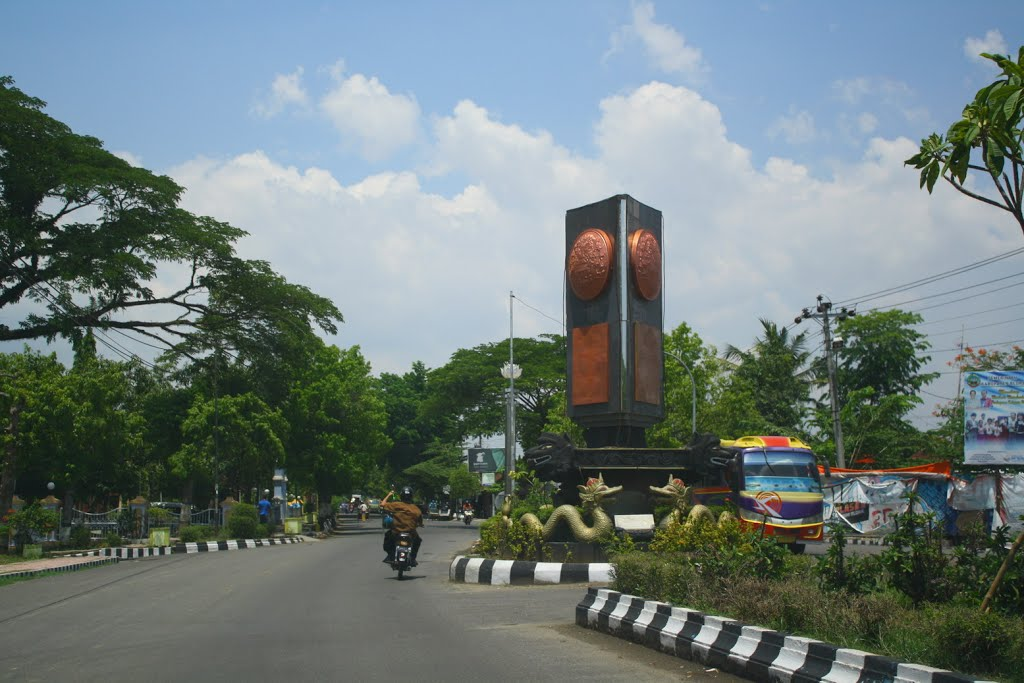
- Adipura monument

- Coat of arms
- Nicknames: Mbloro (Javanese); Blora (Indonesian)
- Mottoes: Sasana Jaya Kerta Bhumi and MUSTIKA (Maju, Unggul, Sehat, Tertib, Indah, Kontinyu, Aman) (Advanced, Superior, Healthy, Beautiful, Continuous, Secure)
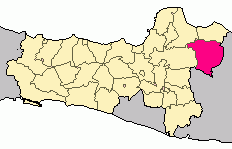
- Location within Central Java

- Location in Java Location in Indonesia
- Coordinates: 6°57′0″S 111°25′0″E
- Country: Indonesia
- Province: Central Java
- Incorporated (regency): 11 December 1749
- Capital: Blora

Government
  - Regent: Arief Rohman
  - Vice Regent: Sri Setyorini
  - Chairman of the Regional Representatives Council: HM. Dasum

Area
  - Total: 1,955.83 km^{2} (755.15 sq mi)

Population (mid 2026 estimate)
  - Total: 920,104
  - Density: 470.442/km^{2} (1,218.44/sq mi)
- Time zone: UTC+7 (WIB)
- Area code: (+62) 296
- Website: blorakab.go.id

Blora (Indonesian pronunciation: [ˈblora]; Javanese: ꦧ꧀ꦭꦺꦴꦫ) is a regency in the northeastern part of Central Java province in Indonesia. Its capital is the town of Blora. The regency is located in the easternmost part of Central Java and borders the Bengawan Solo River and the East Java province. It covers an area of 1,955.83 km^{2} and it had a population of 829,728 at the 2010 Census and 884,333 at the 2020 Census; the official estimate as of mid 2026 was 920,104 (comprising 459,802 males and 460,302 females).

== Etymology ==
According to folklore, the word Blora is derived from the word belor which means mud. It then evolved into mbeloran, then contracted to blora. This folk etymology could partly explain the origin of this name, as the word evolved from Old Javanese instead of the modern belor. See the explanation below.

The word Blora means low, watery ground. The name was derived from way and lorah combined (wailorah), which means water and cliff, respectively. During its evolution, the Modern Javanese language evolved voiced plosive [b] from the previous approximant [w] in Old Javanese in the same manner as in Persian. Modern Javanese has also monophthongized Old Javanese "ai" or "ay" into "e", and lost its h's in many places, almost similar to that of French from Latin. Therefore, wailorah became bailorah, then bailora, and finally blora.

== History ==
=== Duchy of Jipang ===
Blora was under the administration of the Duchy of Jipang in the 16th century, which was itself still ruled by the Demak Sultanate at the time. The Duke of the duchy was Arya Penangsang, better known as Aria Jipang. The area under the control of the duchy includes Pati, Lasem, Blora, and Jipang. But, after Joko Tingkir (Hadiwijaya) inherited the throne, the capital was moved into Pajang. After that, Blora was under the Kingdom of Pajang.

=== Mataram Kingdom ===
The Duchy of Jipang did not rule for long, because it was seized by the Mataram Kingdom. Blora was in the eastern part of the kingdom (Bang Wetan). During the reign of Pakubuwono I (1704–1719), Blora was given to his son, Pangeran Blitar, and appointed as a duke. The area of Blora at that time was 22.5 km^{2}. In 1719–1727, the Mataram Kingdom was led by Amangkurat IV, so Blora was under Amangkurat IV's rule.

=== War of Mangkubumi ===
When Mataram was under the administration of Pakubuwono II (1727–1749), there was a rebellion led by Mangkubumi and Mas Sahid, Mangkubumi succeeded in controlling Sukawati, Grobogan, Demak, Blora, and Yogyakarta. Finally, Mangkubumi was appointed by the people to be a king in Yogyakarta.

=== Incorporation as a regency ===
From the Pajang era to the Mataram era, the Blora Regency was an important area for kingdoms. This was because Blora was known for its teak forests. News from Babad Giyanti and Serat Kuntharatama stated that Mangkubumi became a king on 11 December 1749, the day Blora Regency was created. Along with the appointment of Mangkubumi as a king, other officials were also appointed. The leader of the Mangkubumen warriors, Wilatikta, was appointed as the first regent of Blora. Blora's status changed from apanage into a regency on that same day.

=== Sultanate of Surakarta ===
The War of Mangkubumi ended with the Giyanti agreement, in 1755, which was known as palihan negari. Because of this agreement, Mataram was divided into two kingdoms, the Surakarta Sultanate under Paku Buwana III, and Yogyakarta, under Sultan Hamengkubuwono I. In the now-divided kingdom, Blora was in the Surakarta Sultanate as part of the Mancanegara Timur area. However, the regent of Wilatikta did not agree to join the sultanate, so he chose to resign from his position.

=== Dutch East Indies ===
Resistance by the people against the Dutch, which was pioneered by the peasants, emerged in the late 19th and early 20th centuries. It was caused by the worsening social and economic conditions of the rural population at that time. In 1882, a head tax was imposed by the Dutch, which was very burdensome for landowners (farmers). In other areas in Java, tax increases have led to peasant revolts, such as the Cilegon incident in 1888. Two years later, Saminism, a mystical religious sect, rose from the Randublatung region in Blora and Bojonegoro Regency in 1890, and gained prominence in the early 20th century. Headed by a Javanese peasant, Surontiko Samin, it followed the teachings of the Islamic prophet Adam but owed little to the religion. Stressing the village structure, mysticism, and sexuality, it became an early protest movement and was opposed to the local rulers as much as it was against the Dutch East Indies colonial administration, refusing to pay the new Dutch head tax. After 1907, many followers were detained and arrested by the Dutch. The movement survived until the 1960s.

During the administrative restructuring of Java during 1925–8, Blora briefly became one-half of the new Blora Residency; it was abolished in 1931.

== Geography ==
The regency has an area of 1,955.83 km^{2} (755.15 sq mi). Blora Regency consists of both lowland and hilly areas between 20 and 280 metres high above sea level. The northern part of the regency is a hilly area that forms a series of Northern Limestone Mountains as well as the southern area (Kendeng Mountains) that stretches from east of Semarang to Lamongan (East Java). The capital of Blora Regency is located right on the slope of the Northern Limestone Mountains.

Half of Blora Regency's area is forested, especially in the northern, eastern, and southern regions, while the central lowland is mainly used for agricultural purposes (rice fields). During the dry season, most of Blora Regency has a water supply shortage, either for drinking or irrigation, especially in limestone and mountainous areas. In the rainy season, several areas are prone to landslides.

=== Locations ===
==== Adjacent regencies ====
- Rembang Regency—north
- Tuban Regency, East Java—northeast
- Bojonegoro Regency, East Java—east and southeast
- Ngawi Regency, East Java—south and southwest
- Grobogan Regency—southwest and west
- Pati Regency—northwest

== Demographics ==
Historical population
Year	Pop.	±%
1961	507,375	—
1971	567,091	+11.8%
1980	696,523	+22.8%
1990	767,228	+10.2%
2000	826,229	+7.7%
2005	827,587	+0.2%
2010	829,728	+0.3%
2015	851,841	+2.7%
2020	884,333	+3.8%
2026	920,104	+4.0%

Blora Regency had a population of 884,333 in 2020, an increase of 54,605 since the 2010 census. The officialk estimate as at mid 2026 was 920,104. Almost all of the population is Muslim (98%). The gender ratio in mid 2026 was 99.89 (males per 100 females).

== Administrative districts ==
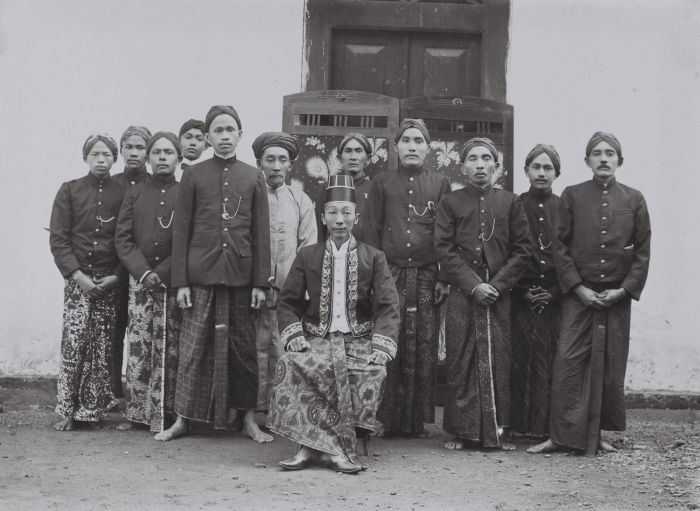
Regent of Blora, Raden Toemenggoeng Ario Said, during colonial period. 5 June 1921.

Blora Regency is divided into 16 districts or kecamatan, sub-divided into 271 rural villages or desa, and 24 urban villages or kelurahan. Before the division in the 2000s, Blora Regency (at that time the Blora Level II District) was divided into an administrative city, five regent assistants, 19 (nineteen) sub-districts, nine sub-district representatives, 429 rural villages or desa, and 26 urban villages or kelurahan. The present districts are tabulated below with their areas and their populations at the 2010 and 2020 Censuses, together with the official estimates as of mid 2026. The table also includes the locations of the district administrative headquarters and the number of villages in each district, together with their postcodes.

Kode Wilayah	Name of District (kecamatan)	Area in km^{2}	Pop'n census 2010	Pop'n census 2020	Pop'n estimate mid 2026	Admin centre	No. of villages	Post codes
33.16.01	Jati	215.38	45,177	49,143	51,131	Doplang	12	58384
33.16.02	Randublatung	235.92	73,969	77,649	80,790	Randublatung	18 ^{(a)}	58382
33.16.03	Kradenan	112.04	38,721	41,062	42,723	Menden	10	58383
33.16.04	Kedungtuban	108.45	54,220	57,447	59,771	Kedungtuban	17	58381
33.16.05	Cepu	49.04	72,146	76,370	79,459	Cepu	17 ^{(b)}	58311: 58315
33.16.06	Sambong	102.68	24,933	27,659	28,778	Sambong	10	58371
33.16.07	Jiken	165.40	37,369	38,374	39,926	Jiken	11	58372
33.16.15	Bogorejo	60.82	23,548	24,805	25,808	Bogorejo	14	58262
33.16 08	Jepon	119.19	58,940	62,824	65,365	Jepon	25 ^{(c)}	58261
33.16.09	Blora Kota (town)	72.33	90,714	93,779	97,572	Blora	28 ^{(d)}	58211: 58219
33.16.11	Banjarejo	110.64	56,907	62,152	64,666	Banjarejo	20	58253
33.16.10	Tunjungan	89.36	44,828	47,981	49,922	Tunjungan	15	58252
33.16.16	Japah	129.23	33,321	35,310	36,738	Japah	18	58257
33.16.12	Ngawen	104.86	55,950	60,559	63,009	Ngawen	29 ^{(e)}	58254
33.16.13	Kunduran	124.72	61,972	66,189	68,866	Kunduran	26 ^{(c)}	58255
33.16.14	Todanan	155.77	57,013	63,030	65,580	Todanan	25	58256
	Totals	1,955.83	829,728	884,333	920,104	Blora	295	

Notes: (a) including 2 kelurahan (Randublatung and Wulung). (b) including 6 kelurahan (Balun, Cepu, Karangboyo, Ngelo, Ngroto and Tambakromo). (c) including one kelurahan (Jepon).
(d) comprising 12 kelurahan (Bangkle, Beran, Jetis, Karangjati, Kauman, Kedungjenar, Kunden, Mlangsen, Sonorejo, Tambahrejo, Tegalgunung and Tempelan) and 16 desa.
(e) including 2 kelurahan (Ngawen and Punggursugih). (f) including one kelurahan (Kunduran).

== Transportation ==
An inter-provincial road passes through Blora, connecting Semarang, the capital of Central Java, to Surabaya, the capital of East Java via Purwodadi. It is a 2nd class road, because most people prefer Semarang-Surabaya via Rembang, due to the wider road there.

Blora is also situated on a southern railway connection that links most big cities in Java. However, Blora's main train station is located in Cepu District. Therefore, people often refer to the Cepu train station. Except for the two above, Blora is just like any other regencies in Java, which has several local public transportation services, such as bemo, becak, etc.

Ngloram (Kapuan) Domestic Airport is at Ngloram (Kapuan), Cepu District with a 900-metre long runway, located at 7°11′41″S 111°32′51″E, built in 1978, but officially closed in 1980. In 2013, expansion and land acquisition was still in progress. Six years after that, the airport reactivation plan was started.

== Economy ==
Agriculture is the main sector of the economy. In the forestry sub-sector, Blora is one of the main producers of high quality teak wood in Java.

The Cepu area has long been known as an area full of petroleum, which has been exploited since the Dutch East Indies era. Blora received international attention in 2001 when oil reserves of ~250 million barrels were discovered in Cepu. In March 2006, the contract between the government and contractors (PT. Pertamina EP Cepu, Exxon Mobil Cepu Ltd, and PT Ampolex Cepu) was signed, and Exxon Mobil Cepu Ltd.) was appointed as the field operator, in accordance with the Joint Operating Agreement (JOA) of the three contractors. According to the latest developments, the Banyu Urip Field Plan of Development (POD) has been approved by the Minister of Energy and Mineral Resources.

Even though Blora is known for its teak forests and petroleum, which have been managed since the Dutch colonial era to the current Indonesian government, Blora is one of the poorest in Central Java. The ubiquitous natural resources in the regency are not able to raise the standard of living of its people. This is because all of the natural resources benefits the central government and company employees, most of which are outside Blora, without a clear program to improve the economy of the local people.

== Places of interest ==
- Terawang Cave at Todanan district.
- Kantor Pelayanan Pajaka Pratama
- Cepu Forest Railway or Cepu Loko Tour with some Berliner Maschinenbau steam locomotives from Berlin, Germany, Central Europe at Ngelo, Cepu district.
- Tempuran reservoir in Blora City
- Greneng reservoir in Tunjungan
- Blora City Park in Blora City
- Sarbini Park or Water Splash in Blora City
- Tirtonadi Park in Blora City
- Sculpture Satay Park in Gagaan Village, Kunduran District
- Thousand Lights Park in Cepu City
- Samin Village in Klopodhuwur Village, Kunduran District
- Bentolo reservoir in Todanan
- Randhakuning reservoir in Muraharjo Village, Kunduran District
- Spring vegetables in Soko Village
- Pencu Hill in Bogorejo District
- Manggir Mountain in Ngumbul Village

== Culture ==
=== Arts and festivals ===
Barongan Gembong Amijoyo is carried out in village and family agendas, such as sedekah bumi. It is performed either with or without a storyline.

Tayub Blora is often held in various agendas in Blora, usually held at weddings. In addition, Tayub Blora is often performed in annual village agendas. To preserve the culture of Blora, the local government held the Tayub Nusantara Festival at Tirtonadi Blora Park.

Kadrohan or Terangan in Blora comes from districts that have a strong santri culture. It is growing rapidly in the Blora and Ngawen subdistrict. It is usually performed to fill recitation events, circumcisions and weddings. There are two types of Kadrohan, traditional and modern. Traditional hadro does not use melodic instruments. In the middle of the performance, the narration of Berjanjen or Manaqib Syeh Abdul Qodir Jailani is usually read.

Karawitan is a traditional music that is often performed at weddings. The purpose is to entertain guests at weddings with Javanese music. The main instrument is a set of gamelan.

== Notable people ==
- Tirto Adhi Soerjo, journalist and founder of Medan Prijaji.
- Pramoedya Ananta Toer, Indonesian writer (The main character of his novel, Buru quartet is based on Tirto Adhi Soerjo).
- Leonardus Benjamin Moerdani, former ABRI Commander from 1983 to 1988 and former Indonesia's Minister of Defense and Security.
- Maria Rahajeng, Miss Indonesia 2014 and represented Indonesia at Miss World 2014 (top 25).
- Pratama Arhan, Indonesian footballer who play for Tokyo Verdy and the Indonesia national team.
- Awam Prakoso, storyteller
