= Cepu (disambiguation) =

Cepu is a district in Blora Regency, Central Java Province, Indonesia.

Cepu or CEPU may also refer to:

== Indonesia ==
- Cepu (town), in Cepu, Blora district
- Cepu station, in Cepu, Blora district
- Cepu field, an oil field operated by Mobil Cepu Ltd; see Energy in Indonesia

== Organisations ==
- Communications, Electrical and Plumbing Union, a trade union in Australia
- CEPU, owner of several universities including Link Campus University

== See also ==
- Ngloram Airport, an airport in Cepu, Central Java, Indonesia
