= NS 3850 =

Dutch railway locomotives during WW II

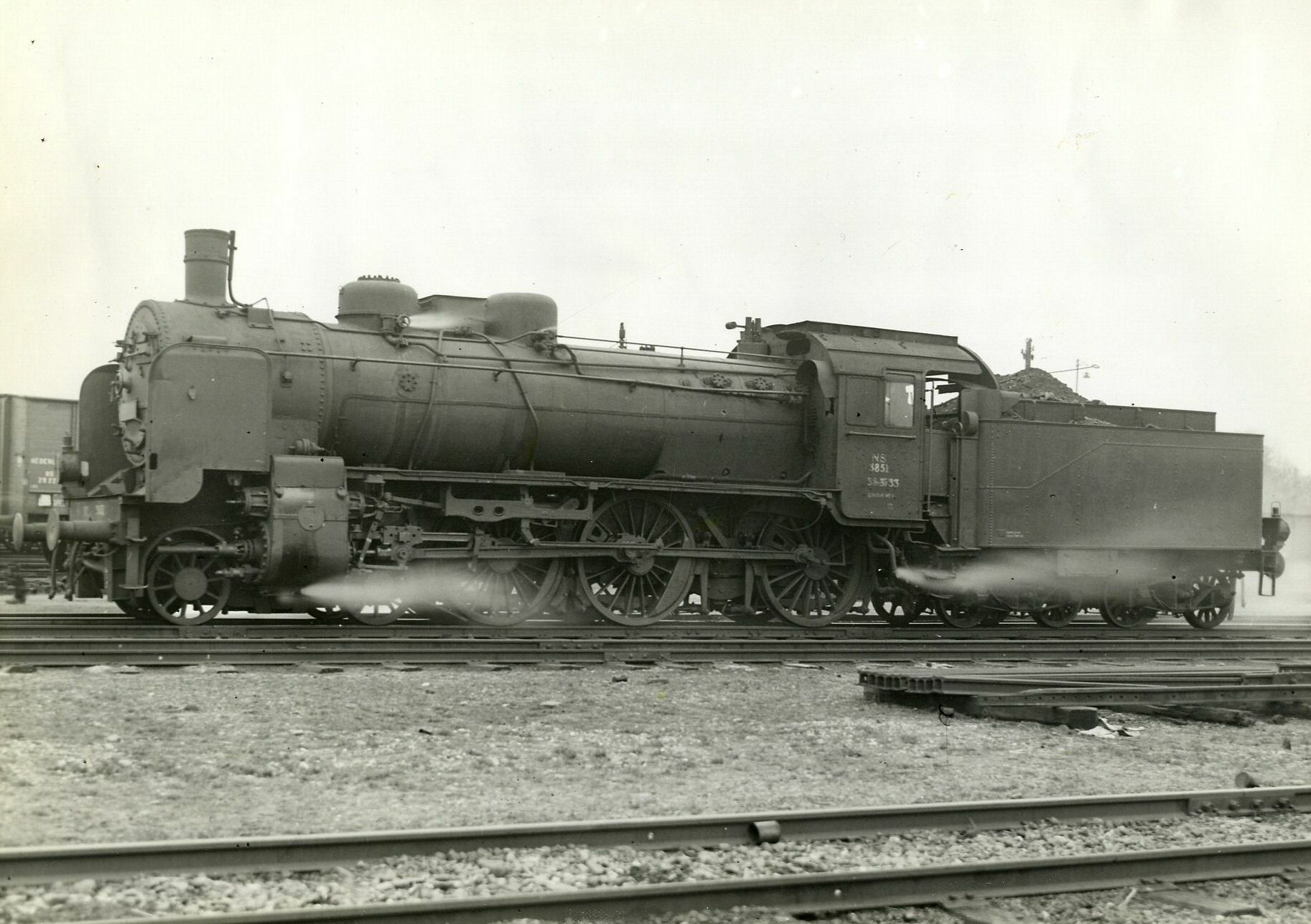
Type and origin
- Power type: Steam
- Builder: Humboldt, Linke-Hofmann, Henschel, Berliner Maschinenbau AG (Schwartzkopff)
- Build date: 1945
- Total produced: 5 (In service with the NS)
Specifications
- Configuration
  - Whyte: 4-6-0
  - UIC: 2'C
- Gauge: 1,435 mm (4 ft 8 1/2 in)
- Leading dia.: 1,000 mm (3 ft 3 in)
- Driver dia.: 1,750 mm (5 ft 9 in)
- Length: 18,590 mm (61 ft 0 in)
- Height: 4,550 mm (14 ft 11 in)
- Loco weight: 78 t (86 short tons; 77 long tons)
- Tender weight: 50 t (55 short tons; 49 long tons)
- Fuel type: Coal
- Fuel capacity: 7 t (7.7 short tons; 6.9 long tons)
- Water cap.: 21.5 m^{3} (4,700 imp gal)
- Firebox
  - Grate area: 2.64 m^{2} (28.4 sq ft)
- Boiler pressure: 12 kg/cm^{2} (170 psi)
- Heating surface
  - Tubes: 3851 – 3852: 127 m^{2} (1,370 sq ft), 3853 – 3854: 135 m^{2} (1,450 sq ft), 3855: 136.6 m^{2} (1,470 sq ft)
- Superheater
  - Heating area: 3851 - 3854: 58.9 m^{2} (634 sq ft), 3855: 54.3 m^{2} (584 sq ft)
- Cylinders: 2
- Cylinder size: 575 mm × 630 mm (22.6 in × 24.8 in)
- Valve gear: Walschaerts
Performance figures
- Maximum speed: Forwards: 100 km/h (62 mph), Backwards: 50 km/h (31 mph), Backwards: 85 km/h (53 mph) (If fitted with a wannentender)
- Tractive effort: 10,000 kgf (22,000 lbf)
Career
- Operators: NS
- Numbers: 3851 – 3855
- Withdrawn: 1947
- Preserved: No engines that were in service with the NS

The NS 3851–3855 was a series of locomotives was in service at the Dutch Railways shortly after the Second World War. They were originally German locomotives.

== History ==
As a successor to the P6, the Prussian P8 was developed by Robert Hermann Garbe. The locomotive was built by the Berliner Machinenbau AG and was intended for the Königlich Preußische Staatseisenbahnen (K.P.St.E.). The first locomotives initially showed some weaknesses, such as wrongly dimensioned connecting rods and a tender that ensured that the locomotive could not run faster than 45 km/h backwards. Over the years, various adjustments were made to the P8, such as the use of a DB tender (wannentender) for the P8, which greatly improved the running characteristics of the locomotive backwards and which was now able to achieve a speed of 85 km/h running in reverse. (the Dutch locomotives had no wannentenders).

== Service with the NS ==
Five locomotives entered service with the NS in 1945 because many Dutch locomotives were taken or destroyed by the Germans in World War II. They were classified as the series NS 3850. They were numbered 3851 to 3855.

All locomotives were returned to Germany in 1947.

Manufacturer	Serial number	DRB number	NS number
Maschinenbau Anstalt Humboldt	1684 of 1922	38 3733	3851
Maschinenbau Anstalt Humboldt	1664 of 1921	38 3553	3852
Linke-Hofmann Werke	1294 of 1916	38 1856	3853
Henschel & Sohn	16881 of 1919	38 2527	3854
Berliner Maschinenbau AG	7201 of 1920	38 2776	3855

== Gallery ==
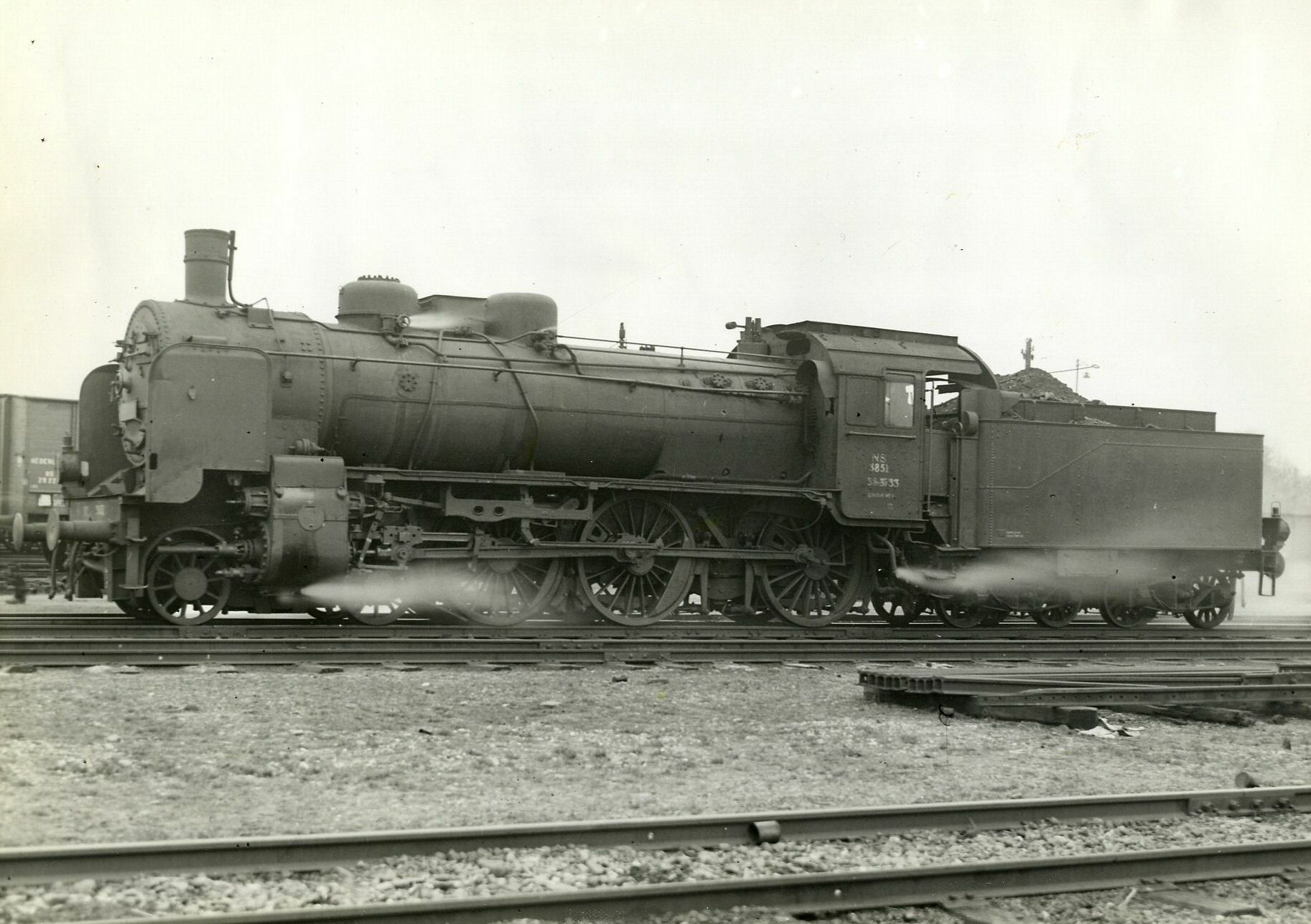
NS 3851 of the NS in Eindhoven. (Locomotive belonged to the D.R.B.)

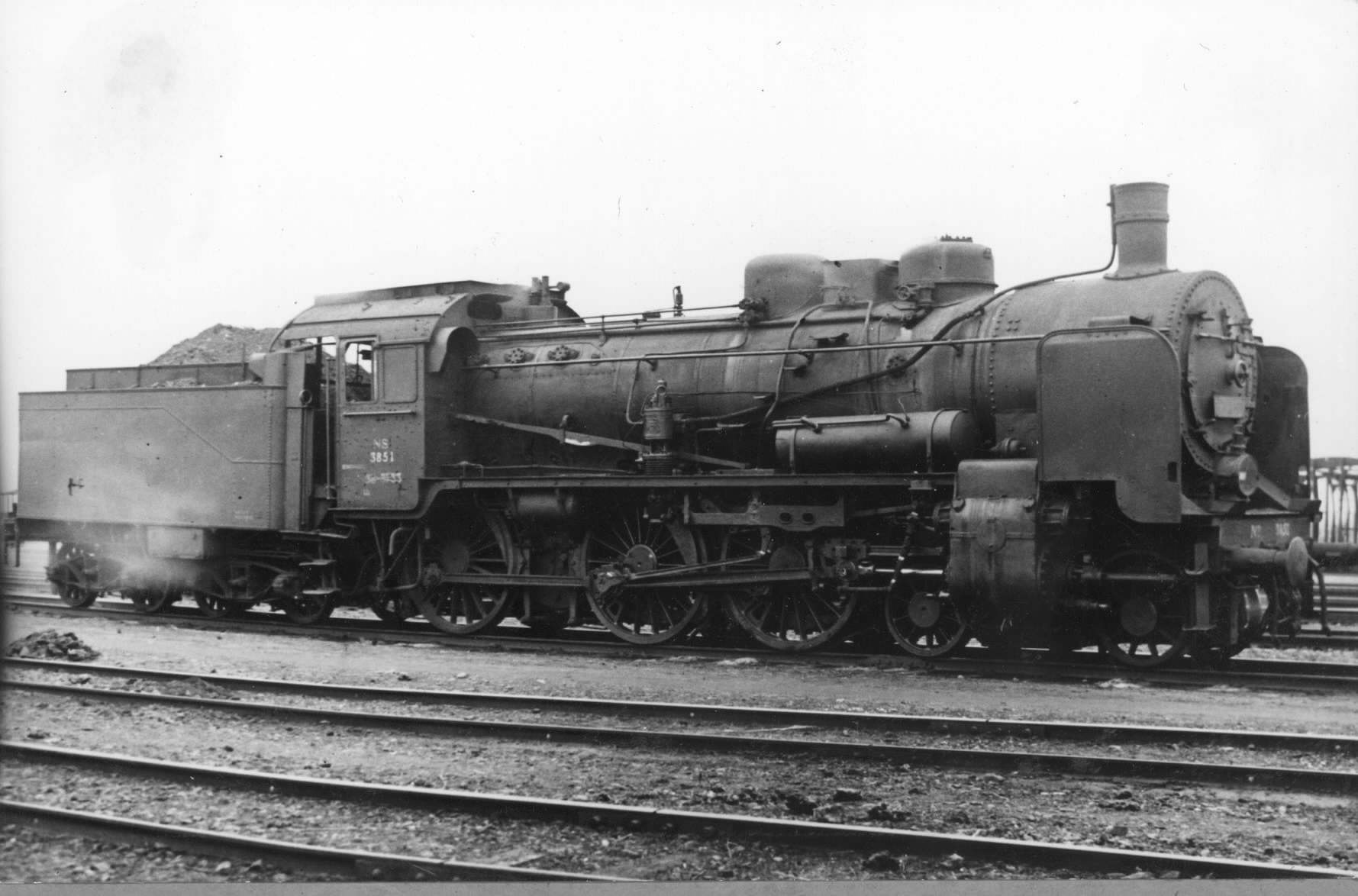
Steam locomotive no. 3851 of the N.S. from the D.R.B. (originally number 38 3733) in Hengelo (1946)

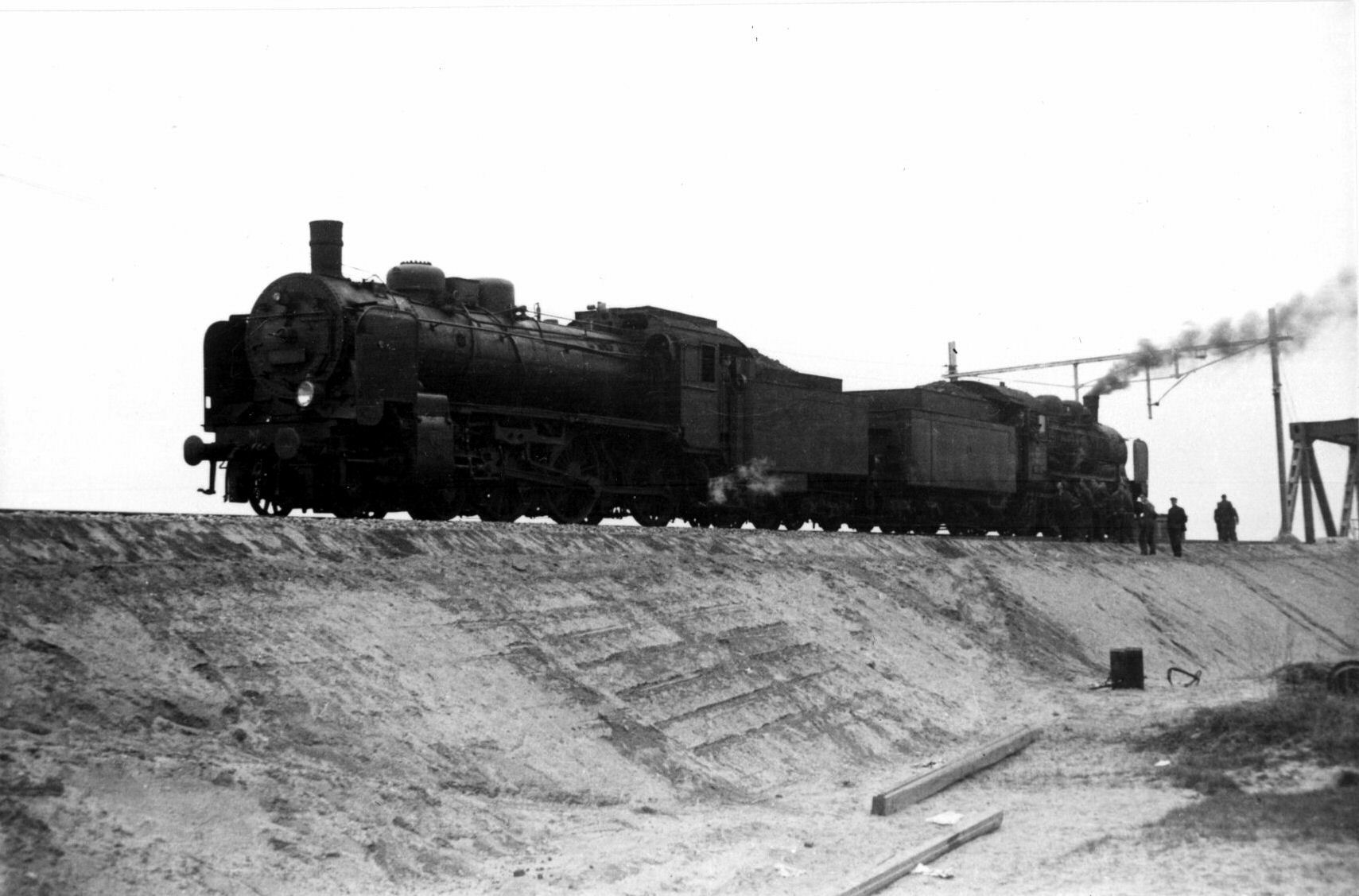
Two locomotives of the series NS 3851 at the (restored) railway bridge over the Maas in Hedel during the load test. These originally German steam locomotives Baureihe 38 that were in service in the Netherlands from 1945 to 1947

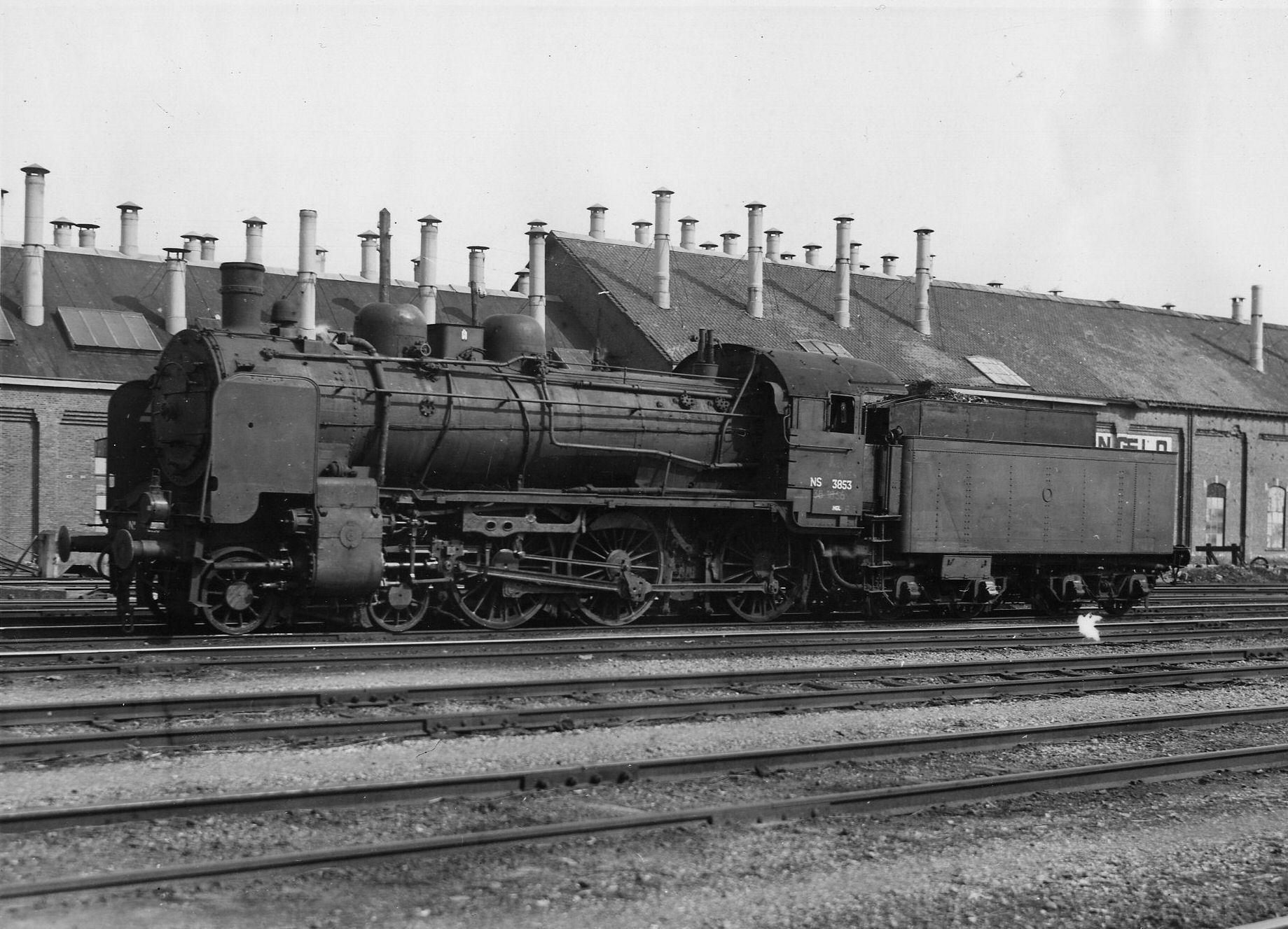
NS 3853 from the D.R.B. (originally number 38 1856) in Hengelo (1946)

== Sources ==
- H. Waldorp: Onze Nederlandse stoomlocomotieven in woord en beeld, (7e druk) uitgeverij De Alk, Alkmaar, 1986. ISBN 90-6013-947-X.
- Het Utrchts Archief
