= Kudus, Indonesia =

Capital of Kudus Regency, Indonesia

Coordinates: 6.8097°S 110.8420°E

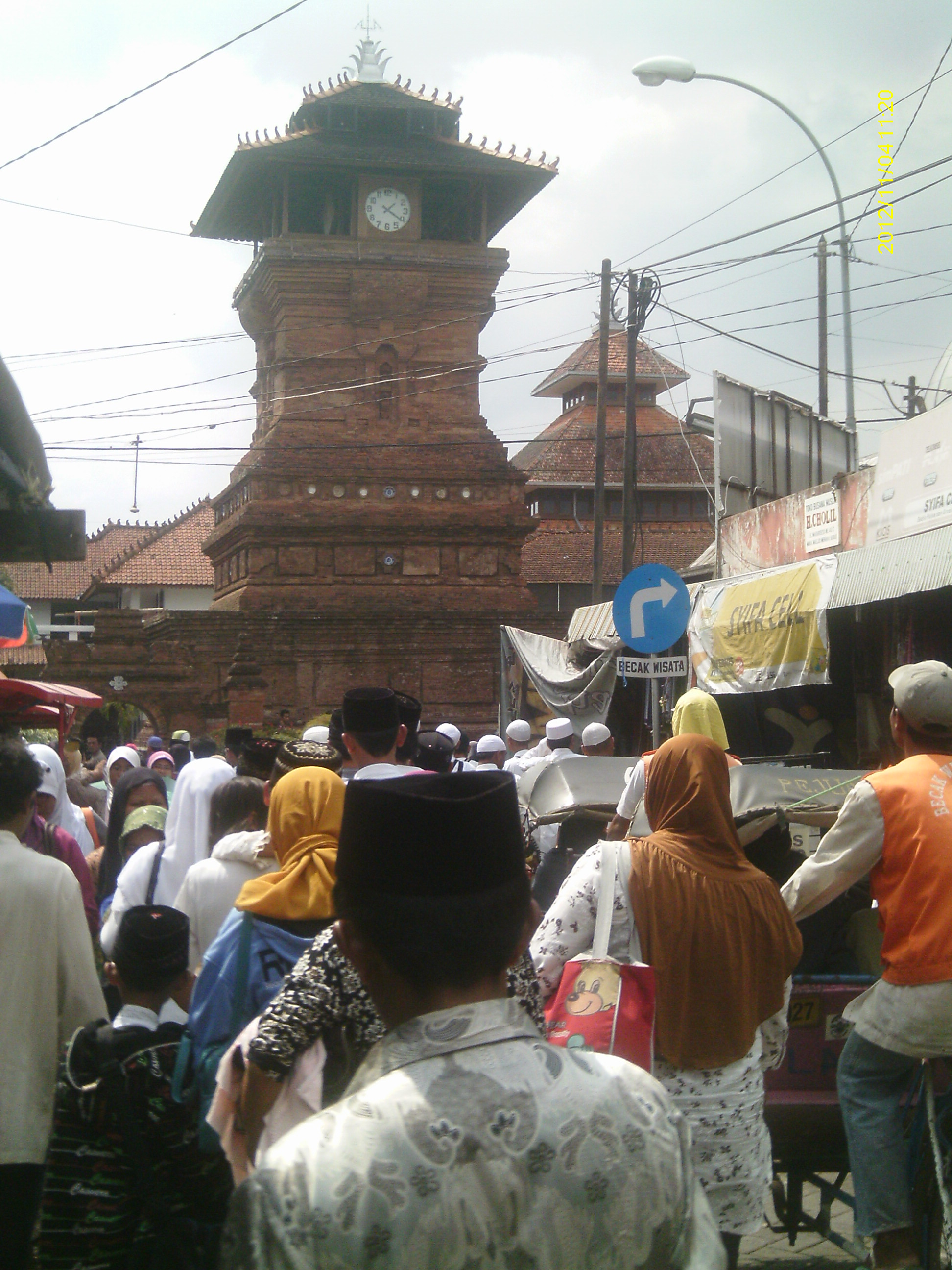
The Minaret of Kudus Mosque

Kudus (Javanese: ꦏꦸꦢꦸꦱ꧀) is the capital and the namesake of the Kudus Regency in Central Java, Indonesia. Its name has an Arabic etymology (Arab: القدس al-Quds) connected to its foundation by the legendary figure Sunan Kudus. It also houses the mosque established by Sunan Kudus named Menara Kudus Mosque, one of the most important and influential mosques in Indonesia. According to the 2010 census, its population was 92,776, but by mid-2022 this had declined to 88,635.

During the Dutch East Indies era, Kudus was the seat of the Kudus Regency which was a part of Semarang Residency dating back to 1817. From 1928 to 1931, it was the seat of the short-lived Koedoes Residency, which incorporated the regency as well as the neighboring Demak and Jepara regencies.

== History ==
On 8 December 1951, a clash between the ex-426 Battalion fighters and the Indonesian National Armed Forces occurred in Kudus after the battalion commander refused to surrender. This marked the start of Battalion 426 rebellion. During the battle, the rebels fired mortar shells, and some fell to the town square. The battle lasted until dusk when heavy rain poured on the town, resulting in the ex-426 Battalion members fleeing the town to the south.

== Climate ==
Kudus has a tropical monsoon climate (Am) with moderate to little rainfall from May to October and heavy to very heavy rainfall from November to April.

Climate data for Kudus
Month	Jan	Feb	Mar	Apr	May	Jun	Jul	Aug	Sep	Oct	Nov	Dec	Year
Mean daily maximum °C (°F)	31.2 (88.2)	31.1 (88.0)	31.3 (88.3)	32.0 (89.6)	31.9 (89.4)	32.1 (89.8)	32.5 (90.5)	33.4 (92.1)	34.4 (93.9)	34.5 (94.1)	33.7 (92.7)	32.2 (90.0)	32.5 (90.6)
Daily mean °C (°F)	26.7 (80.1)	26.7 (80.1)	26.7 (80.1)	27.1 (80.8)	27.0 (80.6)	26.5 (79.7)	26.1 (79.0)	26.7 (80.1)	27.5 (81.5)	28.1 (82.6)	28.1 (82.6)	27.1 (80.8)	27.0 (80.7)
Mean daily minimum °C (°F)	22.2 (72.0)	22.3 (72.1)	22.2 (72.0)	22.3 (72.1)	22.1 (71.8)	21.0 (69.8)	19.8 (67.6)	20.0 (68.0)	20.7 (69.3)	21.8 (71.2)	22.5 (72.5)	22.1 (71.8)	21.6 (70.9)
Average rainfall mm (inches)	514 (20.2)	385 (15.2)	289 (11.4)	172 (6.8)	110 (4.3)	54 (2.1)	39 (1.5)	38 (1.5)	46 (1.8)	118 (4.6)	180 (7.1)	310 (12.2)	2,255 (88.7)
Source: Climate-Data.org
