= BMAG =

BMAG may refer to:

- British Mensa Annual Gathering
- Birmingham Museum & Art Gallery
- Berliner Maschinenbau AG - German manufacturer of locomotives
