= Cepu, Blora =

Cepu
- Kecamatan
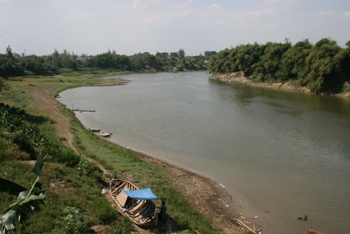
- Solo River in Cepu district

- Location within Java Location within Indonesia
- Coordinates: 7°9′S 111°35′E
- Country: Indonesia
- Province: Central Java
- Regency: Blora
- Capital: Cepu

Government

Area
  - Total: 49.81 km^{2} (19.23 sq mi)

Population (2020 Census)
  - Total: 76,370
  - Density: 1,533/km^{2} (3,971/sq mi)
- Time zone: UTC+7 (WIB)
- Area code: 0296
- Website: Official website

Cepu (formerly Tjepoe or Tjepu) is a district (kecamatan) of Indonesia in Blora Regency, Central Java Province. Its seat is the town of Cepu.

== History and economy ==
In colonial times, when Indonesia was part of the Dutch East Indies, Cepu was known for its teak (timber) and oil. The oil refineries, operated by Bataafse Petroleum Maatschappij, could produce about 11,000 bpd. They were blown up by the Dutch immediately after the Japanese landings on the island of Java in 1942. The invaders, one of whose objectives was the oilfields, committed atrocities. The teak is still highly regarded. By 2001, the oil reserves were thought to have been exhausted; but new ones have been discovered by ExxonMobil, which may yield 235,000 bpd.

== Weather, climate and ecology ==
The nearest weather station to Cepu town appears to be at Surakarta, Central Java, 104 km (65 mi) away.

== Language ==
The local language is Bahasa Jawa Blora, a dialect of Javanese.

== Subdivisions ==
Cepu District comprises the following rural and urban villages:

- Balun
- Cabeyan
- Cepu
- Gadon
- Getas
- Jipang
- Kapuan
- Karangboyo
- Kentong
- Mernung
- Mulyorejo
- Ngelo
- Nglanjuk
- Ngloram
- Ngroto
- Sumberpitu
- Tambakromo

== Transportation ==
Cepu lies between Semarang (127 km (79 mi)), capital of Central Java Province, and Surabaya (179 km (111 mi)), capital of East Java Province, and is connected to them by road. It is 30 km (19 mi) from Blora, capital of Blora Regency.

Cepu is served by Cepu railway station and Ngloram Airport.

Cepu Forest Railway is a steam-powered narrow-gauge light logging railway which also runs tourist trains.

== People ==
- Mukti Ali (1923-2004), Minister of Religious Affairs of the Republic of Indonesia; born in Cepu
- Sekarmadji Maridjan Kartosuwiryo (1905-1962), Indonesian Islamic mystic; born in Cepu
- Leonardus Benjamin Moerdani (1932-2004), general, Commander-in-Chief of ABRI 1983-1988, Minister of Defense and Security; born in Cepu

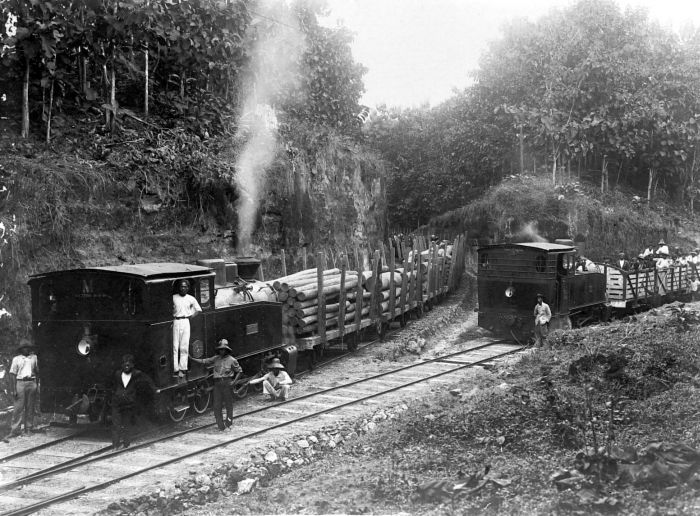
Logging trains in Cepu, c. 1930s.
