= Awam Prakoso =

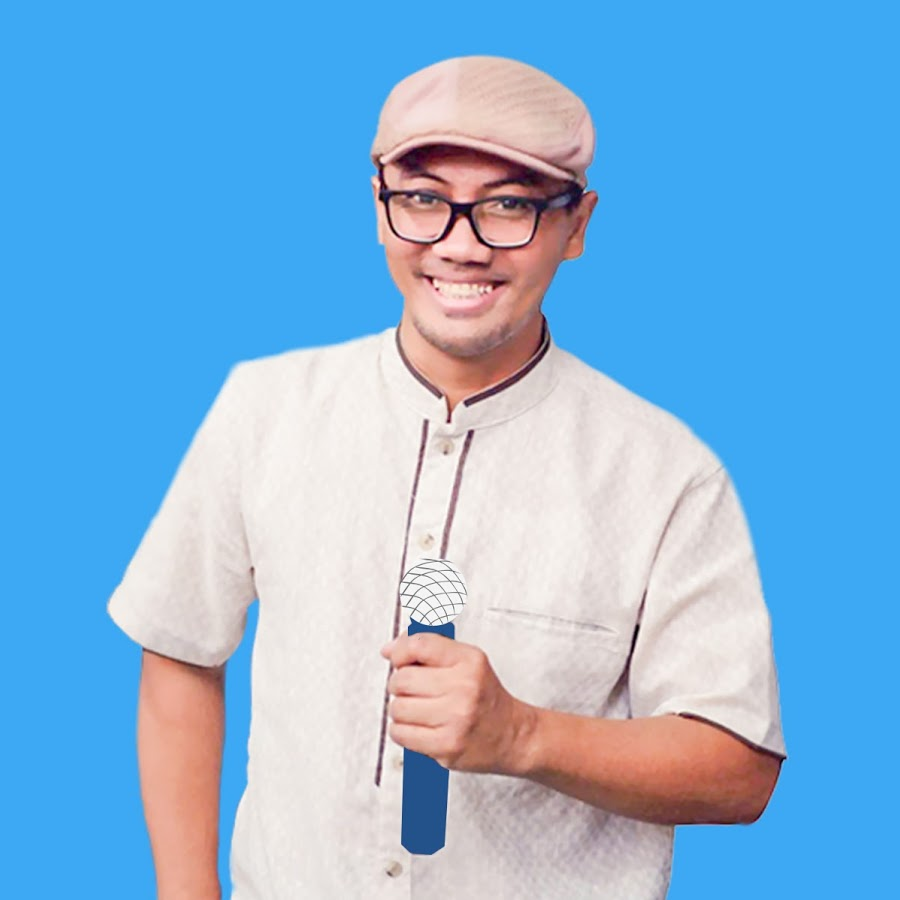
- Born: 18 May 1973 (age 53); Blora, Central Java, Indonesia
- Education: SMA Muhammadiyah 1 Yogyakarta (out)
- Occupations: Chairman & Founder Kampung Dongeng
- Years active: 1999–now
- Children: 3
- Parent(s): Taksisman HW; Soekartini
- Website: Kampung Dongeng Pendongeng

Mochammad Awam Prakoso better known as Kak Awam or Awam Prakoso (b. Blora, Indonesia, 18 May 1973) is a storyteller from Indonesia. Kak Awam is also known as a TV emcee. In 2013 he broke the record for the longest non-stop storytelling (8 hours) at Museum Rekor Dunia Indonesia (Muri). He earned awards as a Young Observer of children from Kak Seto Mulyadi at Grand Indonesia Shopping Town, Jakarta.

== Career ==
Awam Prakoso had an active role in the art world and theater. In 1992, he joined Sanggar KUMMIS (Kumpulan Mahasiswa Muhammadiyah Insan Seni) under the auspices of the campus STIE Ahmad Dahlan Jakarta. Awam appeared in a music video for the song "Abiy" by Haddad Alwi and Sulis in the album Cinta Rasul 5.

He began storytelling in 1999. He appeared across Indonesia and expanded to international storytelling for children. He gave a seminar and provided training for teachers and parents.

He published 25 Cerita Kampung Dongeng and recorded storytelling videos Petualangan Ayam Jago, Cerita Anak Islami, Air Sahabat Anak, Aku Anak Hebat, Tutorial Mendongeng. His albums include Juga karya 2, Lagu Anak berjudul, and Mendongenglah and Album Aku Anak Hebat. Awam built Kampung Dongeng to enrich imagination for kids in South Tangerang,

=== Presenter/storyteller ===
- Diary Bunda, ANTV
- Budi & Kerti, TVRI Nasional
- Kak Awam Punya Cerita in TV Anak Spacetoon
- Asyiknya Ramadhan in TV Anak Spacetoon
- Panggung Dongeng in TV Anak Spacetoon
- Dunia Anak HI Channel @ Firstmedia

== Book ==
- 25 Cerita Kampung Dongeng

== CD/DVD ==
- Petualangan Ayam Jago
- Cerita Anak Islami
- Air Sahabat Anak
- Aku Anak Hebat
- Tutorial Mendongeng
