= DRG Class E 77 =

Class of 56 German electric locomotives

Bavarian Class EG 3 Prussian Class EG 3 DRG Class E 77
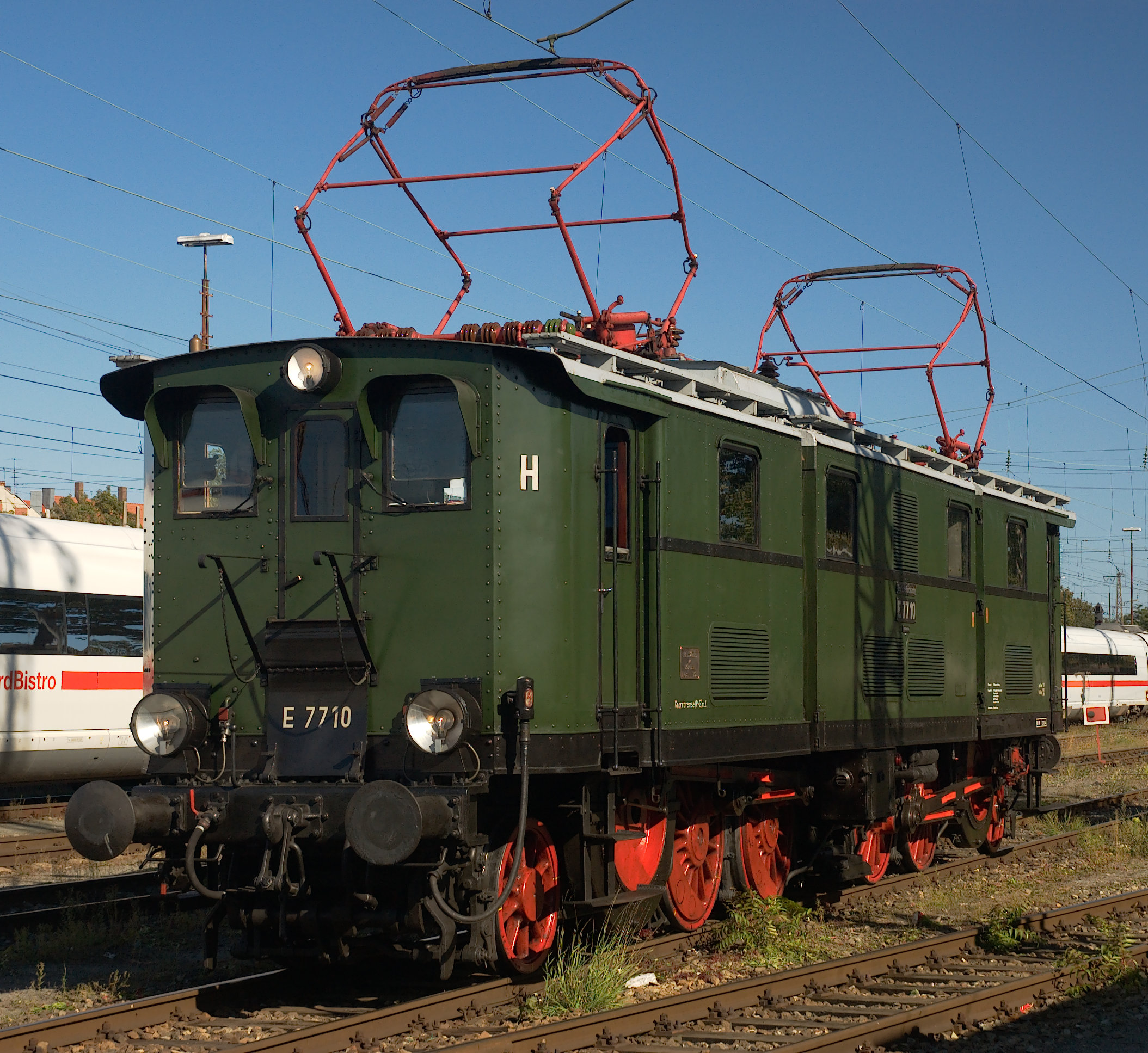
- Museumslok E 77 10
Type and origin
- Builder: BMAG, BMS, Krauss, LHW
- Build date: 1924–1926
- Total produced: 56
Specifications
- Configuration
  - UIC: initially (1B)(B1), later (1′B)(B1′)
- Gauge: 1,435 mm (4 ft 8 1/2 in)
- Length
  - Over beams: 16,250 mm (53 ft 3.8 in)
- Service weight: 113.0 t (111.2 long tons; 124.6 short tons)
- Electric system/s: 15 kV 16 2/3 Hz AC Catenary
- Current pickup: Pantograph
- Traction motors: 2
- Transmission: Winterthur Schrägstangenantrieb
- Running step switch: Electro-pneumatic Schützensteuerung mit Stromteilern
- Loco brake: Compressed-air brake
Performance figures
- Maximum speed: 65 km/h (40 mph)
- Power output
  - 1 hour: 1,880 kW (2,520 hp)
  - Continuous: 1,600 kW (2,100 hp)
- Power index: 16.6 kW/t
- Tractive effort
  - Starting: 235 kN (53,000 lb_{f})
Career
- Numbers: 01–31; 51–75
- Retired: 1968

The German DRG Class E 77 was a Deutsche Reichsbahn-Gesellschaft electric locomotive class, which was ordered in 1923 and entered service in 1924. The 56 units of this class were specifically intended for the Halle (Saale) - Leipzig line and for routes in southern Germany.

== Pre-war period ==
The E 77 had been designated a light multi-purpose locomotive within DRG's first classification programme. Later it was mainly used on freight trains.

The engines were delivered by BMAG, Krauss and LHW and had originally still held the State Railways' Class EG 3 title with numbers 22 001 through 031 (Bavarian) or EG 701 to 725 (Prussian). BMS delivered the electrical parts.

In service, the E 77 distinguished itself with a rather limited result. One was never really satisfied with its running abilities. Moreover, there were often problems due to the many flexible electric cables. During World War II all engines ended at the Reichsbahndirektionen Halle und Hanover in exchange for Class E 75.

== Post-war period ==
At the end of the war, 53 locomotives were left. 42 thereof, as well as parts of engines E 77 02, 09, 19, 28, 56, 67, 71 and 73, which had been taken out of service due to damages, were ceded to the Soviet Union as reparations. E 77 06 and 51 were so heavily damaged that their scrapping in Leipzig was authorized in 1947/48. Nothing is known of E 77 64's post-war fate. In 1952/53, 38 of the reparations locomotives (not E 77 05, 58 and 75) were returned into DR's stock. Of them, only 10 units with numbers E 77 03, 10, 14, 15, 18, 24, 25, 30, 52 and 53 were repaired past 1955. The others were scrapped only in the 1960s. When sufficient numbers of new electric locomotives were available, Class E 77 was retired and save for E 77 10, all units were scrapped as well until late in 1966. For a few years, E 77 10 still served as a switch heating engine at Halle central station and was then converted to a heritage locomotive at the Dresden railway works, whereby it was almost restored to its prior state.

== Technical data ==
Save for the first series of Prussian locomotives (EG 701 - 713, later E 77 51 to 77 63), all engines had originally had cowl doors. At the reinstatement by DR though, those were dropped. The trailer axles of the threepartite linked locomotives were at first embedded steeply and later flexibly, so that the wheel arrangement was changed from (1B)(B1) to (1'B)(B1'). But even after this conversion they were not yet satisfied with the engines' smoothness.

The work schedule featured the following transportation services:

- Freight trains with 1,800 tonnes at a 3 permille slope with 30 km/h
- Passenger trains with 500 t at 3 permille with 60 km/h
- Passenger trains with 500 t at 10 permille with 50 km/h and
- Freight trains with 850 t at 10 permille with 25 km/h.

The locomotives had 15 permanent running steps.

== Preserved locomotives ==
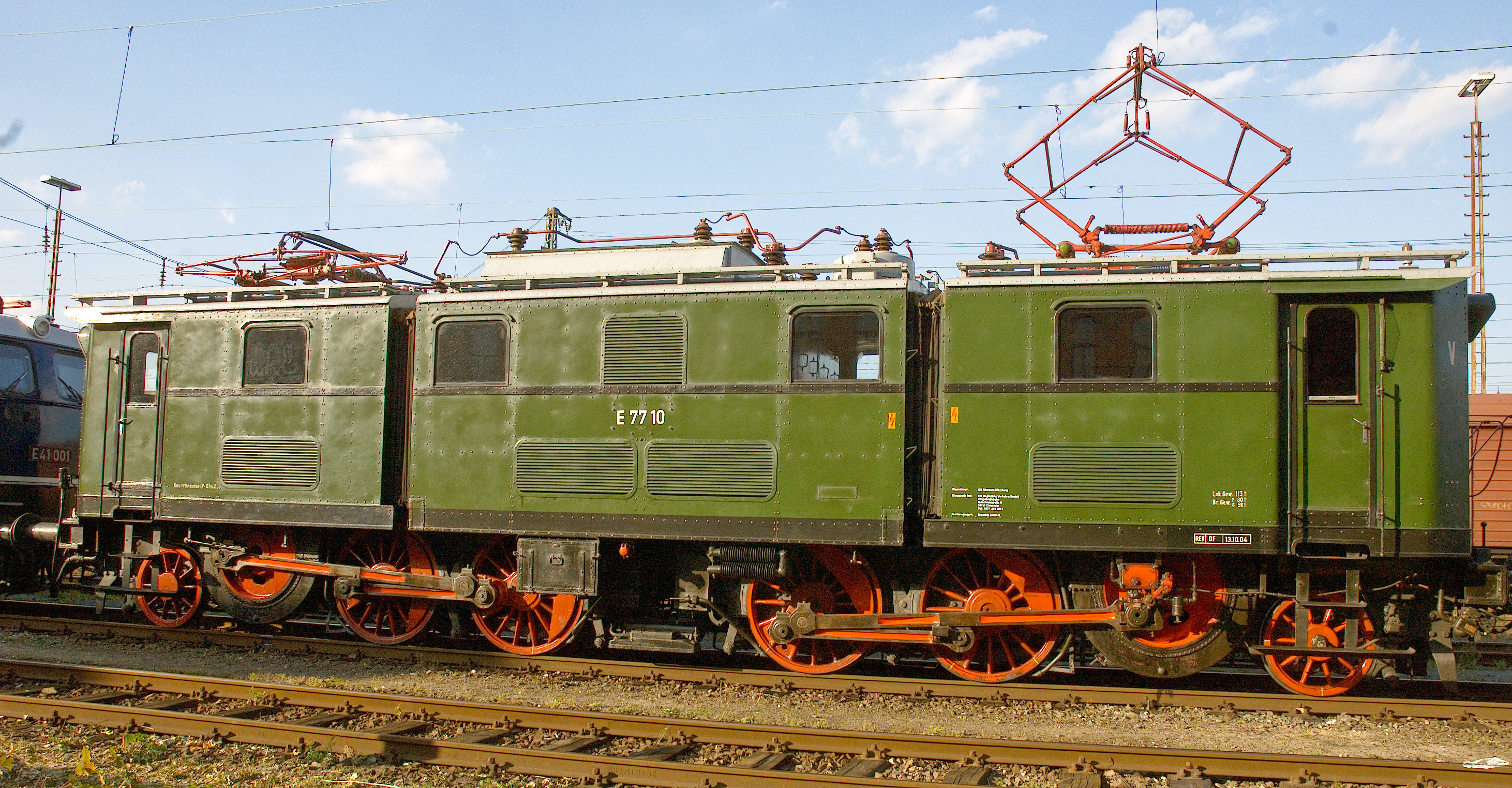
E 77 10 preserved at Dresden Transport Museum

Of the 56 exemplaries built in total, one unit has been preserved. E 77 10 is nowadays based at the Dresden Transport Museum.

== See also ==
- List of DB locomotives and railbuses
- List of DRG locomotives and railbuses
- List of Bavarian locomotives and railbuses

== Literature ==
- Obermayer, Horst J. (1970). Taschenbuch Deutsche Elektrolokomotiven (in German). Stuttgart: Franckh'sche Verlagshandlung. ISBN 3-440-03754-1.
- Bäzold; Fiebig (1984). Eisenbahn-Fahrzeug-Archiv 4, Elektrische Lokomotiven deutscher Eisenbahnen (in German). Düsseldorf and Berlin: Alba- Verlag and Transpress Verlak. ISBN 3-87094-106-5.
