= Blora Residency =

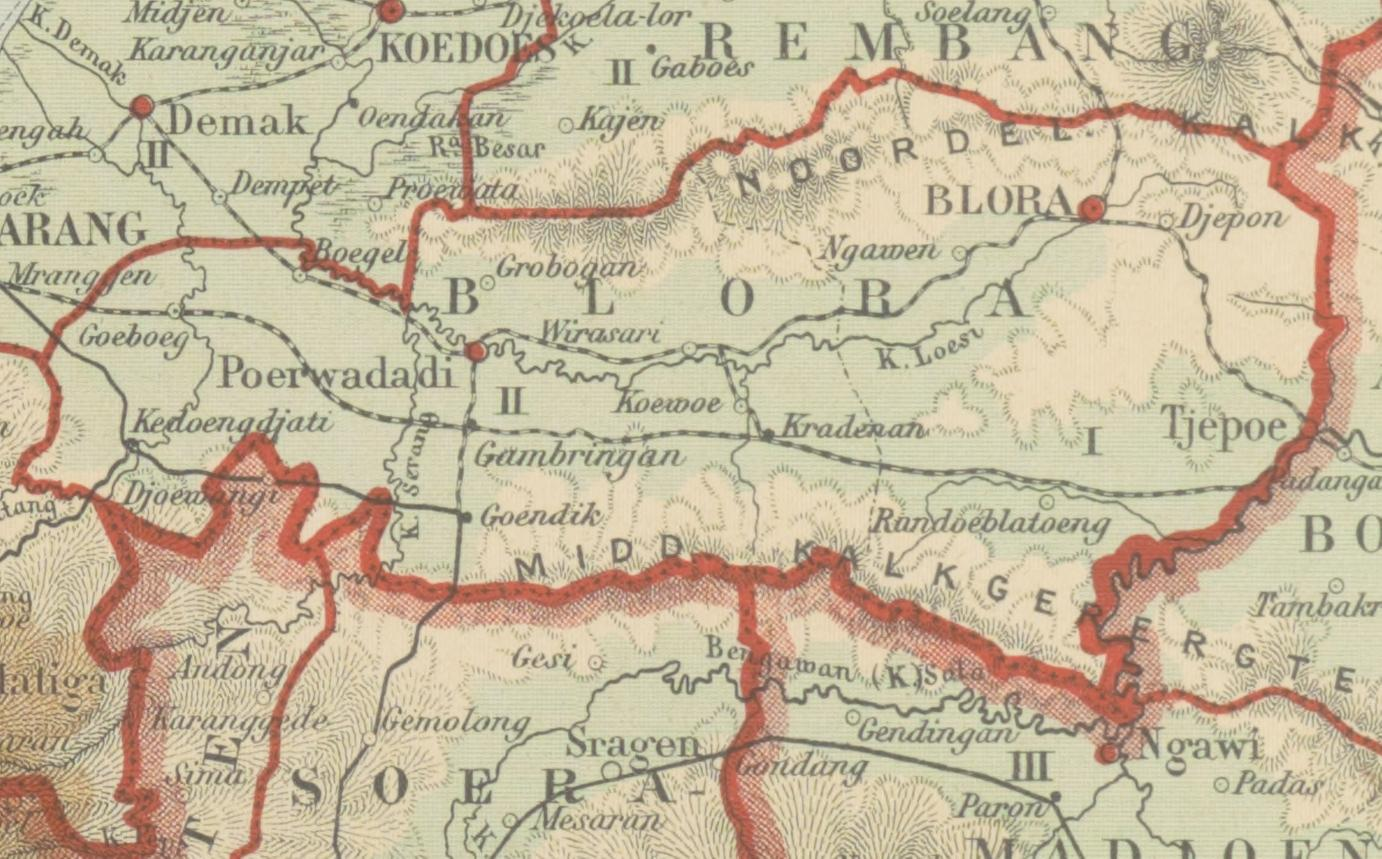
1928 map of Blora Residency

Blora Residency (Dutch: Residentie Blora) was an administrative division (Residency) of Central Java province of the Dutch East Indies with its capital at Blora, which existed between 1928 and 1931. It was significantly larger than the present-day Blora Regency, as it also contained Grobogan Regency and Purwodadi.

== History ==
This region was part of the Demak Sultanate in the sixteenth century; after its decline the Mataram Sultanate came to claim it. As the Dutch East India Company (VOC) became a greater presence in Java in the seventeenth century, they allied themselves with Mataram in exchange for trade and territorial concessions; they eventually came to control most of the northern coast of central Java including Semarang and the region around Blora. After 1817 when the Dutch reorganized Java into Residencies, the western part of this region became part of Semarang Residency and the eastern part became a part of Rembang Residency.

Blora Residency was created as a result of the 1925 Decree on the Administrative Organization which allowed for the subdivision of existing residencies in the Indies. However, it took time to implement and was not put in place in Central Java province (Provincie Midden-Java) until 1928. The new Blora Residency consisted of two Regencies, Blora Regency and Grobogan Regency, and the seat of the residency was in the small city of Blora. Its population in 1928 was estimated to be 827,847, roughly 98% of whom were Native Indonesians, around 1 percent Chinese Indonesians. During its existence the Residency had only two Residents. The first was Willem Ferdinand Dirk Philips (from 1 July 1928 to 2 June 1930), who had been Assistant Resident of Blora Regency before the Residency was created. The second was Jan Habbema (from 2 June 1930 to 1931), the former Resident of Rembang.

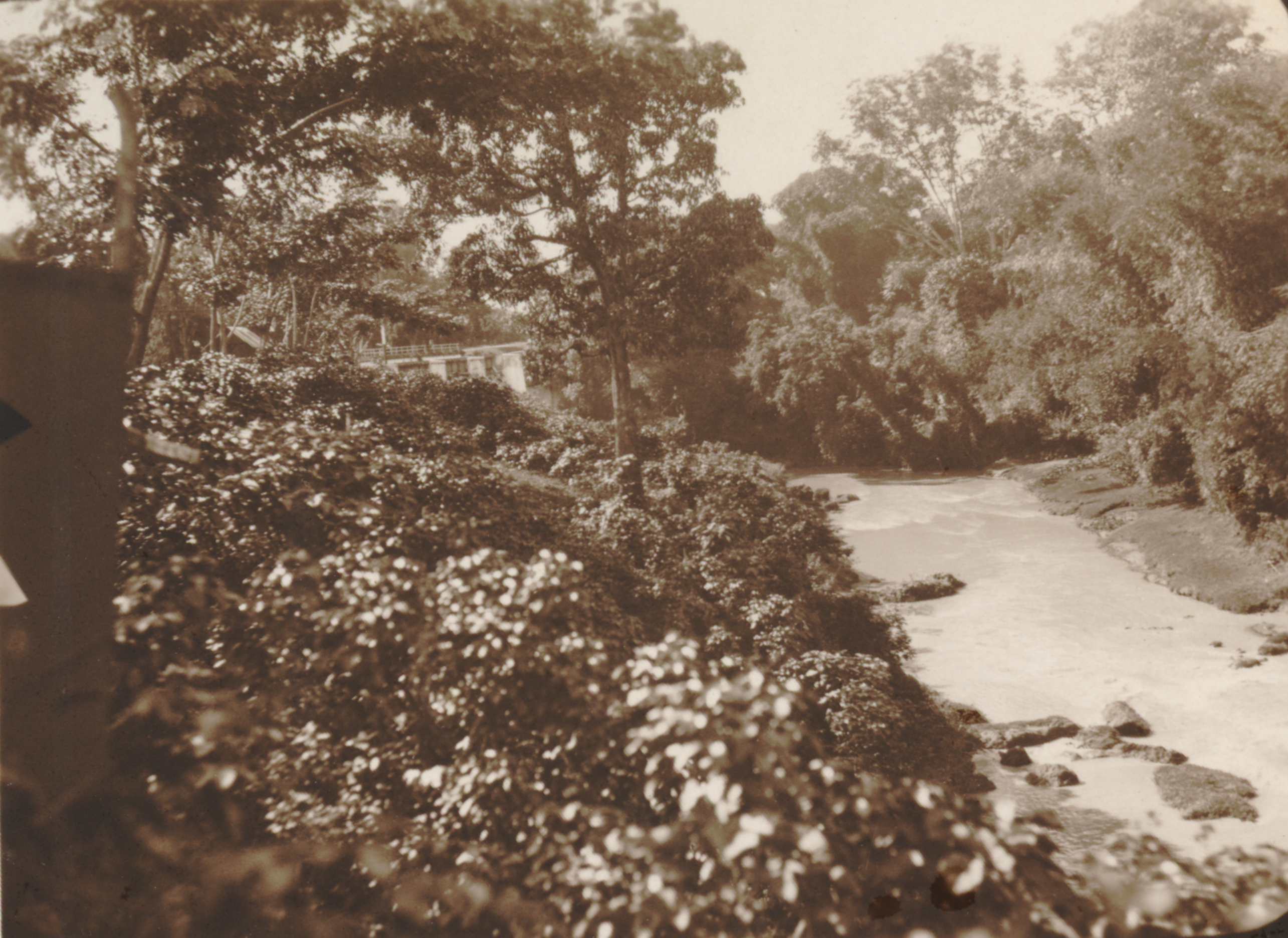
A river scene near Purwodadi, Blora Residency, 1928

The Residency was also used as a unit of measure in the 1930 Census. At that time its population was estimated to be 932,164.

Blora Residency was abolished in 1931 when the Indies government restructured the Residencies in Java once again; its western part became part of Semarang Residency, and its western and northern part became a part of the new Djapara-Rembang Residency.
