= DRG Class 71.0 =

Class of 6 German 2–4–2T locomotives

Type and origin
- Power type: Steam
- Builder: Berliner Maschinenbau (2); Borsig (2); Krupp (2)
- Build date: 1934–1936
- Total produced: 6
Specifications
- Configuration
  - Whyte: 2-4-2T
  - UIC: 1′B1′ h2t
  - German: Pt 24.15
- Gauge: 1,435 mm (4 ft 8 1/2 in)
- Leading dia.: 850 mm (2 ft 9 1/2 in)
- Driver dia.: 001–002: 1,500 mm (4 ft 11 in); 003–006: 1,600 mm (5 ft 3 in)
- Trailing dia.: 850 mm (2 ft 9 1/2 in)
- Wheelbase
  - Axle spacing (Asymmetrical): 2,700 mm (8 ft 10 1/4 in) +; 3,000 mm (9 ft 10 1/8 in) +; 2,700 mm (8 ft 10 1/4 in) =
  - Engine: 8,400 mm (27 ft 6 3/4 in)
- Length
  - Over headstocks: 10,500 mm (34 ft 5 3/8 in)
  - Over buffers: 11,800 mm (38 ft 8 5/8 in)
- Height: 4,165 mm (13 ft 8 in)
- Axle load: 15.0 t (14.8 long tons; 16.5 short tons)
- Adhesive weight: 001–002: 29.9 t (29.4 long tons; 33.0 short tons); 003–006: 30.0 t (29.5 long tons; 33.1 short tons)
- Empty weight: 001–002: 45.4 t (44.7 long tons; 50.0 short tons); 003–006: 45.62 t (44.90 long tons; 50.29 short tons)
- Service weight: 001–002: 48.6 t (47.8 long tons; 53.6 short tons); 003–006: 58.61 t (57.68 long tons; 64.61 short tons)
- Fuel type: Coal
- Fuel capacity: 001–002: 3.0 t (3.0 long tons; 3.3 short tons); 003–006: 2.8 t (2.8 long tons; 3.1 short tons)
- Water cap.: 7 m^{3} (1,500 imp gal; 1,800 US gal)
- Firebox
  - Grate area: 001–002: 1.37 m^{2} (14.7 sq ft); 003–006: 1.38 m^{2} (14.9 sq ft)
- Boiler
  - Pitch: 2,900 mm (9 ft 6 1/8 in)
  - Tube plates: 3,500 mm (11 ft 5 3/4 in)
  - Small tubes: 44.5 mm (1 3/4 in), 70 off
  - Large tubes: 118 mm (4 5/8 in), 26 off
- Boiler pressure: 20 bar (20.4 kgf/cm^{2}; 290 psi)
- Heating surface
  - Firebox: 001–002: 5.53 m^{2} (59.5 sq ft); 003–006: 5.89 m^{2} (63.4 sq ft)
  - Tubes: 30.4 m^{2} (327 sq ft)
  - Flues: 31.5 m^{2} (339 sq ft)
  - Total surface: 001–002: 67.43 m^{2} (725.8 sq ft); 003–006: 67.79 m^{2} (729.7 sq ft)
- Superheater
  - Heating area: 28.6 m^{2} (308 sq ft)
- Cylinders: Two, outside
- Cylinder size: 001–002: 310 mm × 660 mm (12 3/16 in × 26 in); 003–006: 330 mm × 660 mm (13 in × 26 in)
- Valve gear: Heusinger (Walschaerts)
Performance figures
- Maximum speed: 001–002: 90 km/h (56 mph); 003–006: 100 km/h (62 mph)
- Indicated power: 570 PS (419 kW; 562 hp)
Career
- Operators: Deutsche Reichsbahn; → Deutsche Bundesbahn
- Numbers: 71 001 – 71 006
- Retired: 1955–1956

The German DRG Class 71.0 was a 2-4-2T locomotive with the Deutsche Reichsbahn, which was intended as a replacement for railbuses. Originally it had been planned for these standard engines (Einheitsloks) to haul fast passenger trains.

Two vehicles were delivered in 1934 by the firm of Schwartzkopff and two each in 1936 by the firms of Borsig and Krupp. The two-cylinder superheated engines were equipped with automatic underfeed stokers for one-man operation. In the course of its service the boiler overpressure was reduced from 20 bar to 16 bar for safety reasons. All the locomotives had a plate frame. The second coupled wheelset was driven and the carrying wheels rested in Bissel axles.

The Deutsche Bundesbahn took over all the engines after the Second World War and allocated them to the locomotive depot (Bahnbetriebswerk or Bw) in Nuremberg. Later they were all transferred to Kaiserslautern and Landau. The locomotives were retired by 1956.

No examples of the DRG Class 71.0 remain.

== See also ==
- List of DRG locomotives and railbuses
