= Koedoes Residency =

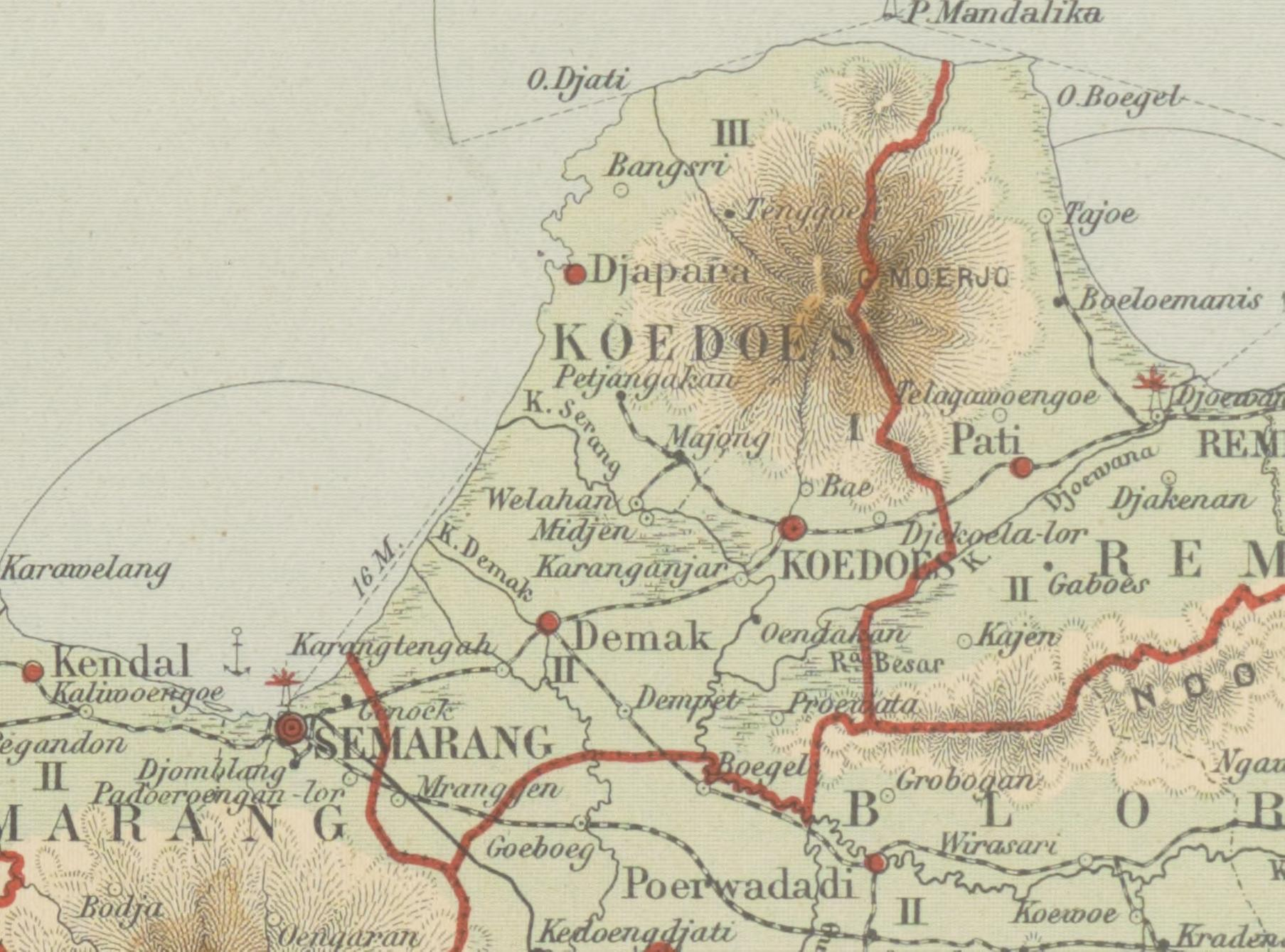
1928 map of Koedoes Residency

Koedoes Residency (Dutch: Residentie Koedoes) was an administrative division (Residency) of Central Java province of the Dutch East Indies with its capital at Kudus, which existed between 1928 and 1931. It was significantly larger than the present-day Kudus Regency, as it also contained Demak Regency and Jepara Regency.

== History ==
The territory around Kudus and Demak was the core of the Demak Sultanate in the sixteenth century; after its decline the Mataram Sultanate came to claim it. Mataram were then forced to concede it to the Dutch; during the nineteenth century and early twentieth century, the area of Koedoes Residency had been a part of Semarang Residency. The area was long known for its tobacco and cotton production as well as historic mosques such as the Menara Kudus Mosque.

Koedoes Residency was created as a result of the 1925 Decree on the Administrative Organization which allowed for the subdivision of existing residencies in the Indies. However, it took time to implement and was not put in place in Central Java province (Provincie Midden-Java) until 1928. At that point, a new Koedoes Residency was created with its capital in Kudus, consisting of roughly one third of the former Semarang Residency, including the Koedoes, Demak, and Japara regencies, with a total size of roughly 2700 square kilometres. There were other minor border changes; Demak Regency gained a subdistrict from Semarang Regency and ceded two to Grobogan Regency. Willem Arthur Cornelis Ilgen, a former controleur and Assistant Resident, became the first and only Resident of Koedoes on 1 July 1928, and Assistant Residents were also appointed in the three Regencies located in the Residency.

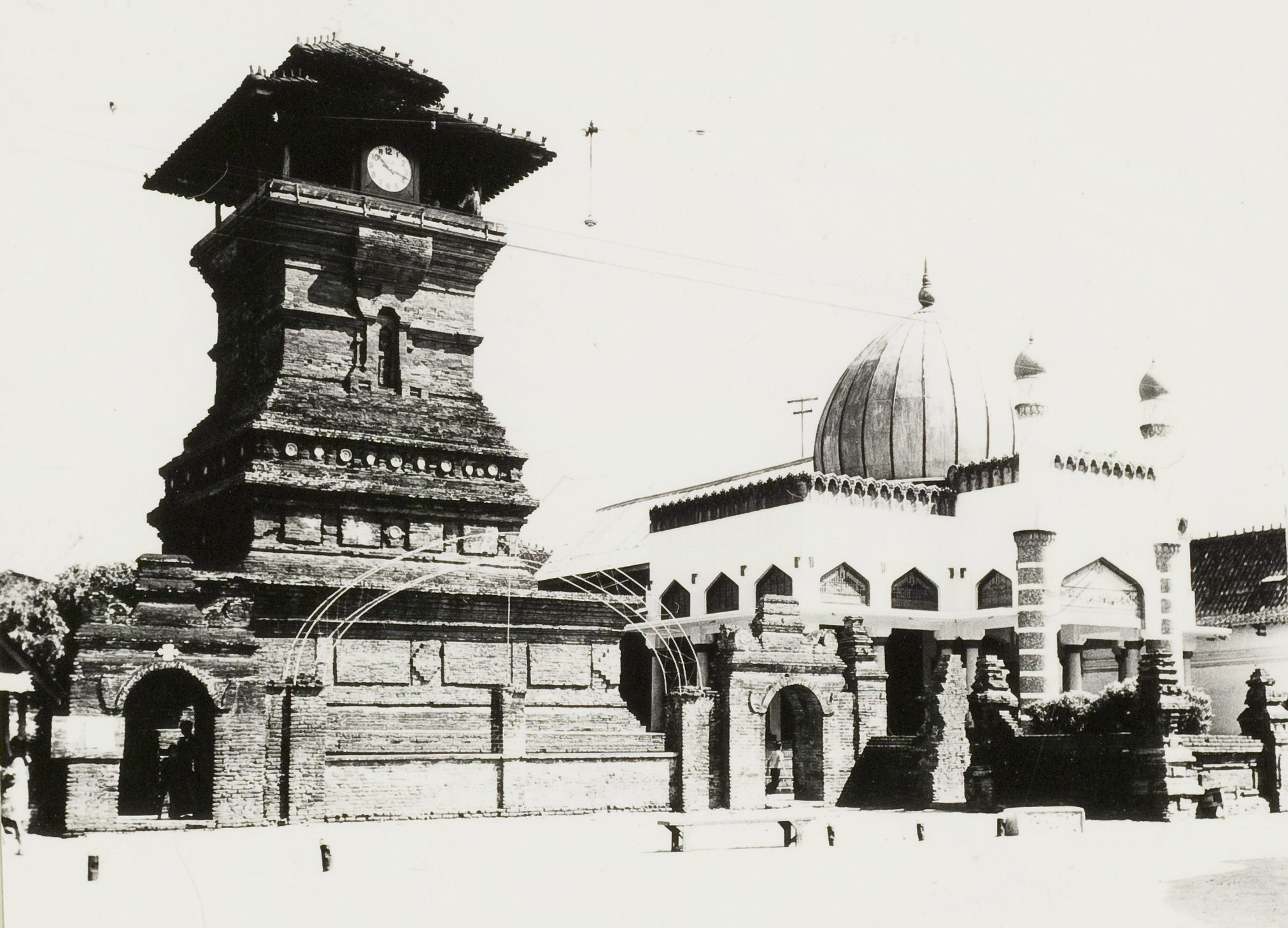
Kudus Mosque, 1940s–50s

The Residency was used as a division in the 1930 Dutch East Indies census; its population was estimated to have been 1,027,786.

Koedoes Residency was abolished in 1931 when the Indies government restructured the Residencies in Java once again; its southern part became part of Semarang Residency, and its northern half became a part of the new Djapara-Rembang Residency.
