= Blora, Blora =

Blora District
- District
- Kecamatan Blora
- Location within Java
- Country: Indonesia
- Province: Central Java
- Regency: Blora Regency

Government
  - Camat: Drs. Kunto Aji

Area
  - Total: 72.33 km^{2} (27.93 sq mi)

Population
  - Total: 96,560
  - Density: 1,335/km^{2} (3,458/sq mi)

Blora is a town and district in Blora Regency, Central Java, Indonesia. The district borders Rembang Regency to the north, Jepon District to the east and south, and Banjarejo District and Tunjungan District to the west. It is also the administrative capital of Blora Regency. During the period of 1928–31, it was also the seat of Blora Residency.

== Administrative divisions ==
Blora consists of 16 rural villages (desa) and 12 urban villages (kelurahan):

Kode Wilayah	Rural village (desa)	Post code	Kode Wilayah	Urban village (kelurahan)	Post code
33.16.09.2001	Jepangrejo	58219	33.16.09.1006	Beran	58216
33.16.09.2002	Kamolan	58219	33.16.09.1008	Bangkle	58218
33.16.09.2003	Pelem	58219	33.16.09.1009	Kedungjenar	58217
33.16.09.2004	Purworejo	58219	33.16.09.1010	Mlangsen	58215
33.16.09.2005	Andonrejo	58219	33.16.09.2011	Jetis	58214
33.16.09.2007	Jejuruk	58219	33.16.09.2012	Tambahrejo	58214
33.16.09.2019	Temurejo	58219	33.16.09.1013	Kauman	58213
33.16.09.2020	Tempurejo	58219	33.16.09.1014	Sonorejo	58213
33.16.09.2021	Patalan	58219	33.16.09.1015	Kunden	58212
33.16.09.2022	Tambaksari	58219	33.16.09.1016	Tempelan	58211
33.16.09.2023	Purwosari	58219	33.16.09.1017	Tegalgunung	58219
33.16.09.2024	Ngadipurwo	58219	33.16.09.1018	Karangjati	58219
33.16.09.2025	Sendangharjo	58219			
33.15.09.2026	Tempuran	58219			
33.16.09.2027	Plantungan	58219			
33.16.09.2028	Ngampel	58219			

The ten kelurahan are situated in the centre of the district, with Jejuruk desa to its east. The first five desa (numbered 2001 to 2005) are south of the centre, and the last ten desa (numbered 2019 to 2028) are north of the centre.

== Geography ==
=== Climate ===
Blora features a tropical monsoon climate (Am). The district features distinctly wetter and drier months, with June through August being the driest months. Blora on average sees approximately 1,800 mm (71 in) of rain annually.

Climate data for Blora
Month	Jan	Feb	Mar	Apr	May	Jun	Jul	Aug	Sep	Oct	Nov	Dec	Year
Mean daily maximum °C (°F)	30.7 (87.3)	30.6 (87.1)	30.9 (87.6)	31.6 (88.9)	31.5 (88.7)	31.5 (88.7)	31.8 (89.2)	32.6 (90.7)	33.7 (92.7)	34 (93)	33.3 (91.9)	31.9 (89.4)	32.0 (89.6)
Daily mean °C (°F)	26.1 (79.0)	26.1 (79.0)	26.4 (79.5)	26.7 (80.1)	26.7 (80.1)	26.2 (79.2)	25.9 (78.6)	26 (79)	26.6 (79.9)	27.1 (80.8)	26.9 (80.4)	26.4 (79.5)	26.4 (79.5)
Mean daily minimum °C (°F)	22.2 (72.0)	22.3 (72.1)	22.3 (72.1)	22.4 (72.3)	22 (72)	21 (70)	20.2 (68.4)	20.1 (68.2)	20.8 (69.4)	21.9 (71.4)	22.5 (72.5)	22.3 (72.1)	21.7 (71.0)
Average rainfall mm (inches)	295.7 (11.64)	233.2 (9.18)	260.8 (10.27)	162.2 (6.39)	128.8 (5.07)	55.8 (2.20)	43.3 (1.70)	35.6 (1.40)	60.7 (2.39)	112.1 (4.41)	186.5 (7.34)	264.8 (10.43)	1,839.5 (72.42)
Average rainy days	18.7	17.6	16.6	12.4	9	7.2	3.6	3.2	3.8	6.2	11.1	16.5	125.9
Average relative humidity (%)	84.7	84.6	84.3	82.7	81.1	78.7	75.6	72.5	71.1	72.7	77	82.2	78.9
Average dew point °C (°F)	23.3 (73.9)	23.3 (73.9)	23.5 (74.3)	23.5 (74.3)	23.2 (73.8)	22.2 (72.0)	21.3 (70.3)	20.7 (69.3)	20.9 (69.6)	21.8 (71.2)	22.5 (72.5)	23.1 (73.6)	22.4 (72.4)
Mean daily sunshine hours	5.8	5.98	6.49	7.93	8.21	8.32	9.39	10.05	9.78	9.29	8.192	6.37	7.98
Mean daily daylight hours	12.8	12.7	12.5	12.5	12.2	12.1	12.1	12.2	12.4	12.6	12.8	12.9	12.5
Source 1: Weatherbase
Source 2: Climate Data (average high and low temperatures)
