= Semarang Residency =

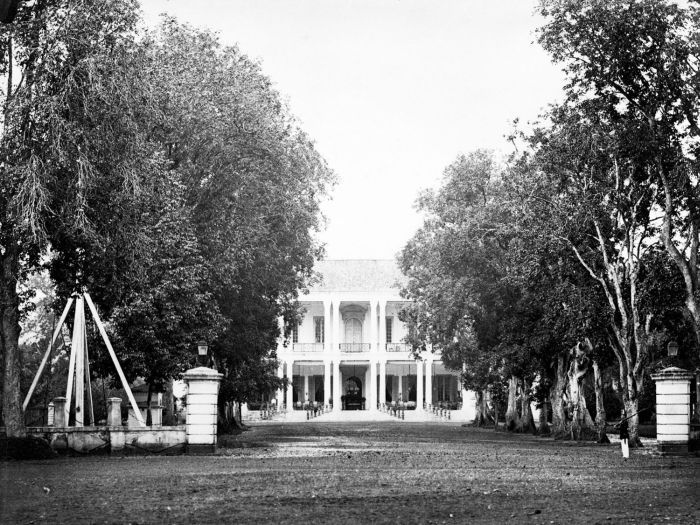
Resident's house in Semarang

Semarang Residency (Dutch: Residentie Samarang) was an administrative subdivision (residency) of the Dutch East Indies located on the northern coast of Central Java and named after its capital city Semarang. It existed from 1818 to 1942, although its borders were changed many times during that period.

== History ==
=== Prehistory ===
Demak Sultanate conquests and expeditions

The territory around Semarang was the core of the Demak Sultanate in the sixteenth century; after its decline the Mataram Sultanate came to claim it. As the Dutch East India Company (VOC) became a greater presence in Java in the seventeenth century, they allied themselves with Mataram in exchange for trade and territorial concessions. Although Mataram continued to control most of central and eastern Java, they ceded the city of Semarang and its surrounding villages to the VOC in January 1678. At first it was only a small enclave, but gradually the VOC demanded expansions until Pakubuwono II was forced to yield all of the northern coast around Semarang to them in the 1740s. They were not initially structured as a residency, but as a Governorate (the Gouvernement of Java's Northeast Coast), with Semarang as its seat. When the French under Napoleon took control of the Indies and appointed Herman Willem Daendels as governor, he abolished the former administrative divisions and created prefectures, including Semarang, Japara, and Pakalongan.

=== Semarang Residency ===
After the end of the French and British interregnum in the Dutch East Indies in 1817, Java was reorganized once again into Residencies. Semarang became one such Residency, although it was much smaller than its later extent, and was bordered by Pekalongan Residency to the west and Djapara Residency to the northeast.

In January 1901 the former Djapara Residency was added to Semarang Residency. A municipal council was established for the city of Semarang in 1906 followed by a regional council for Semarang Residency in 1908.

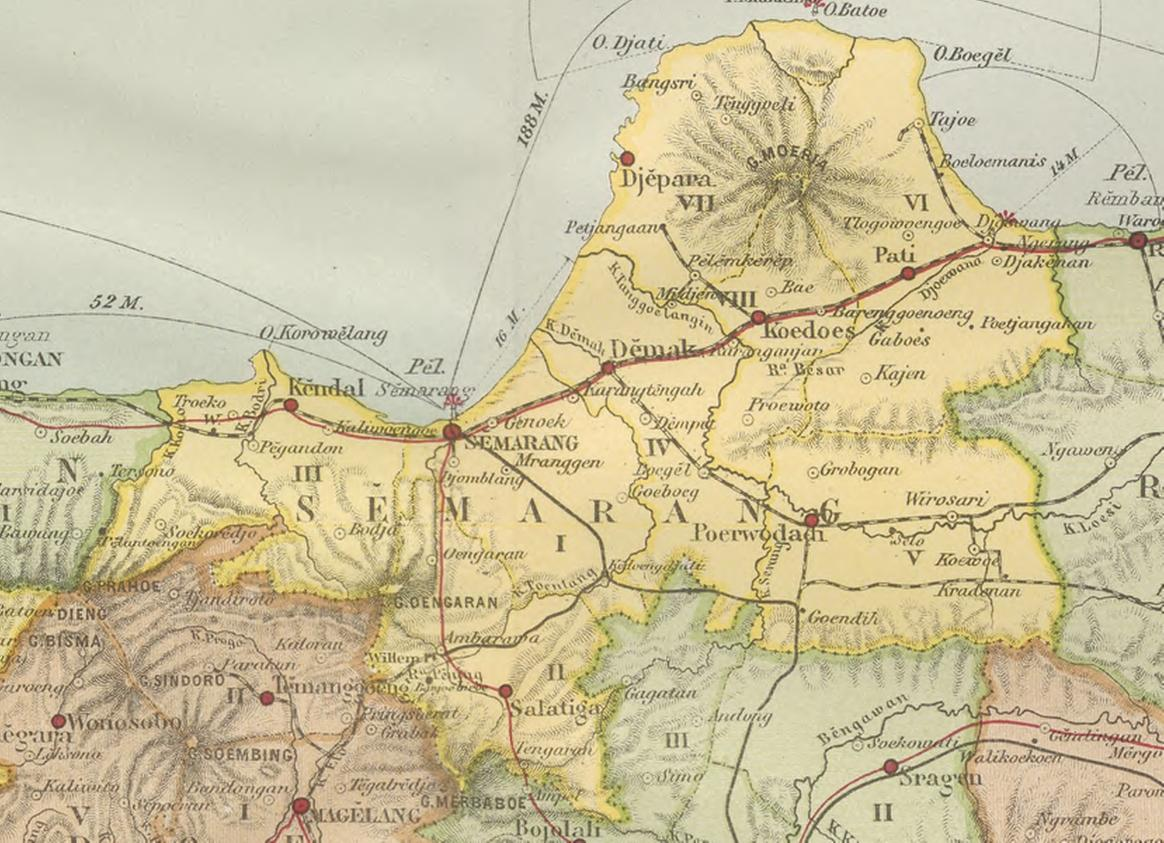
Map of Semarang Residency, 1909

At around the time of World War I it was divided into a number of subdivisions (afdeelingen), most of which still exist as Regencies in Indonesia today:

- Samarang, including Salatiga and Ambarawa;
- Kendal;
- Demak;
- Grobogan (with its capital at Poerwodadi);
- Pati;
- Koedoes;
- and Japara.

In the late 1920s Semarang Residency became considerably smaller because of administrative restructuring. The 1925 Decree on the Administrative Organization allowed for the subdivision of existing residencies in the Indies. However, it took time to implement and was not put in place in Central Java province (Provincie Midden-Java) until 1928. Parts of the former Semarang Residency were incorporated into the new Koedoes Residency and Blora Residency; Semarang only retained Semarang Regency, most of Kendal Regency, and Salatiga. In 1931 the borders were changed once again; Koedoes and Blora residencies were abolished, Semarang absorbed part of their territories, and the new Djepara-Rembang Residency to the northeast absorbed the rest.

After during the Japanese occupation of the Dutch East Indies and the Indonesian National Revolution, the Residencies in Java ceased to exist; after independence Indonesia added the former territory of the Semarang Residency to Central Java province, and retained the subdivisions as regencies (Semarang Regency, Demak Regency, and so on).

== List of residents ==
- Hermannus Adriaan Parvé: 1817–1818
- Jacobus de Bruin: 1818–1820
- Willem Nicolaas Servatius: 1820–1822
- Hendrik Jacob Domis: 1822–1827
- Pieter Hubertus van Lawick van Pabst: 1827–1829
- Pieter le Clereq: 1829–1834
- Daniel François Willem Pietermaat: 1834–1834
- Hendrik Stephanus van Son: 1835–1838
- Guillaume Louis Baud: 1838–1841
- Johan Frederik Walraven van Nes: 1842–1843
- Jacob Willem Hendrik Smissaert: 1843–1846
- Arnoldus Adriaan Buijskes: 1846–1850
- Hermanus Douwe Potter: 1850–1857
- Dirk Carel August van Hogendorp: 1857–1862
- Theodore van Capellen: 1862–1864
- Adriaan Anton Maximiliaan Nicolaas Keuchenius: 1864–1867
- Karel Frederik Stijman: 1867–1868
- François Henri Adolph van de Poel: 1868–1873
- Nicolaas Dirk Lammers van Toorenburg: 1873–1875
- Gerard Marinus Willem van der Kaa: 1875–1877
- Willem Herman van der Hell: 1877–1881
- Pieter Frederik Wegener: 1881–1884
- Jan Marinus van Vleuten: 1884–1885
- Pieter Frederik Wegener: 1885–1897
- Pieter Frederik Sythoff: 1897–1905
- Henri Chrétien Antoine Gérard de Vogel: 1905–1914
- Petrus Karel Willem Kern: 1914–1920
- Jan Hendrik Nieuwenhuis: 1920–1922
- Jacob van Gigch: 1922–1924
- Adrien Henri Maas Geesteranus: 1924–1925
- Pieter Johannes van Gulik: 1925–1928
- Johannes Bijleveld: 1928–1935
- Karel Johann Alex Orie: 1935–1937
- Adolph Maximiliaan Pino: 1937–1940
- Jan Frederik Antonie van Bruggen: 1940–1942
