= Cepu Forest Railway =

Narrow-gauge railway in Indonesia

Coordinates: 7°8′16.2″S 111°36′21.32″E

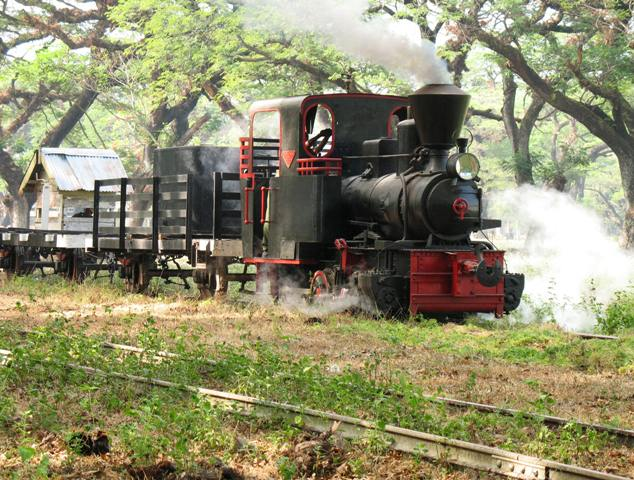
Cepu Forest Railway – Du Croo & Brauns locomotive

The Cepu Forest Railway (officially branded as Loco Tour Cepu) is a 1,067 mm (3 ft 6 in) narrow gauge light logging railway that runs through teak plantations to the northwest of the town of Cepu, in Cepu district, on the boundary between Central and East Java provinces, on the island of Java in Indonesia. It is owned by Perhutani, a state-owned forestry company of Indonesia. Steam traction is still dominant.

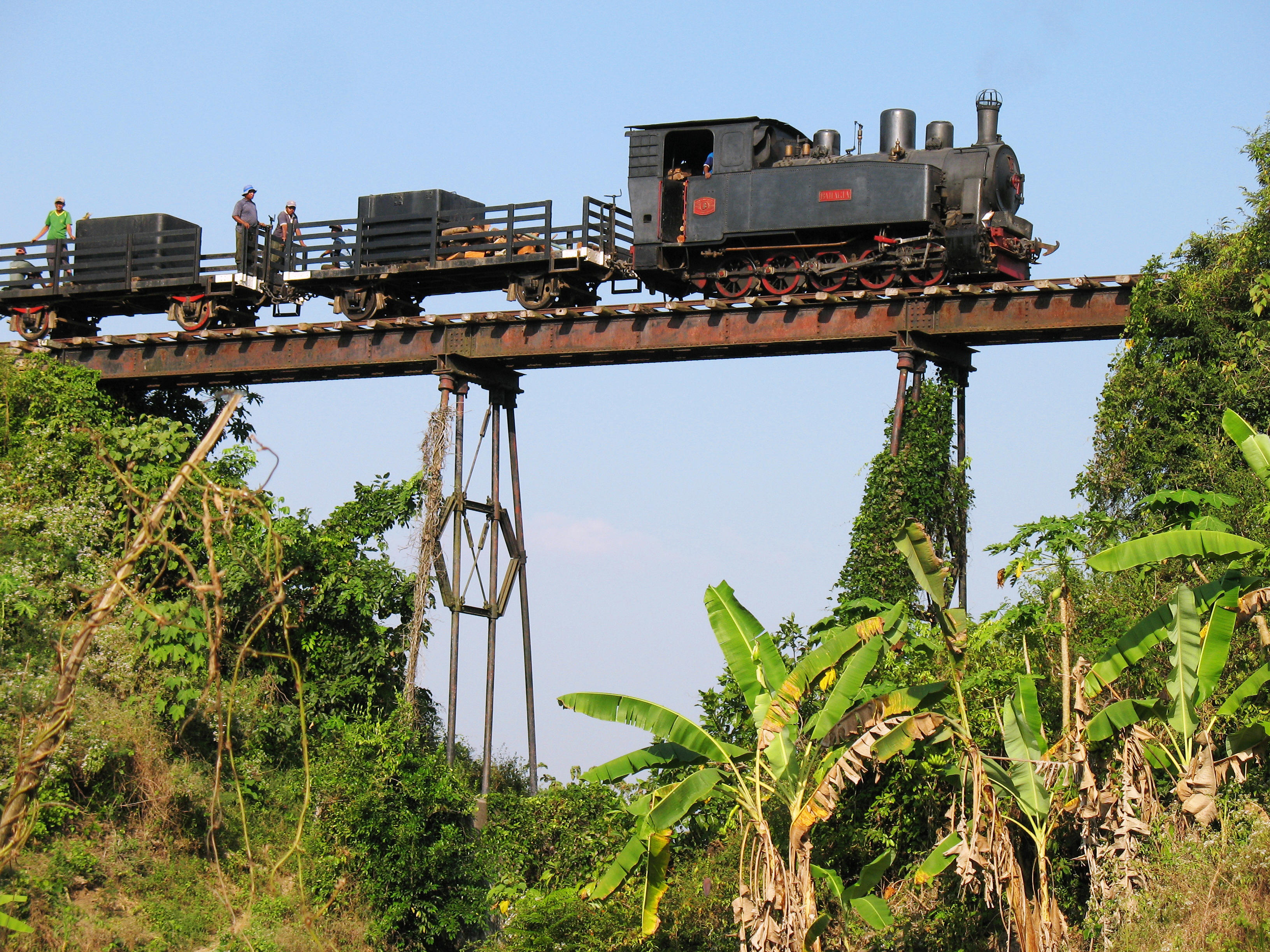
The iconic bridge between Cepu and Gubug Payung on the Cepu Forest Railway: a major attraction for railway enthusiasts

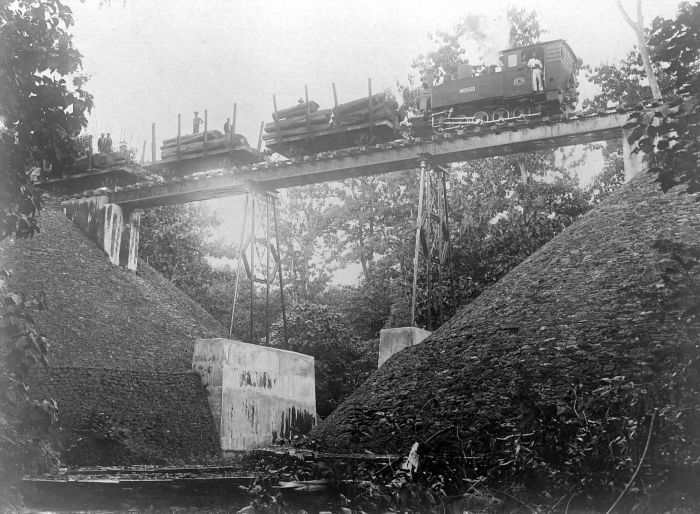
Historic photograph of the bridge between Cepu and Gubug Payung, 1937

Along with Olean Sugar Mill in Situbondo, East Java (a candidate World Heritage Site), Tasik Madu sugar mill and the rack railway at Ambarawa (both also in Central Java), the Cepu Forest Railway is one of the four main centres of steam railway heritage remaining in Java. In fact, with four operable steam locomotives, built by Berliner Maschinenbau and Du Croo & Brauns, the Cepu depot has the largest concentration of active preserved steam locomotives in Indonesia. It is therefore of major heritage importance and due to its globally significant status as an active and complete steam locomotive-powered logging railway it might also be considered a candidate World Heritage Site.

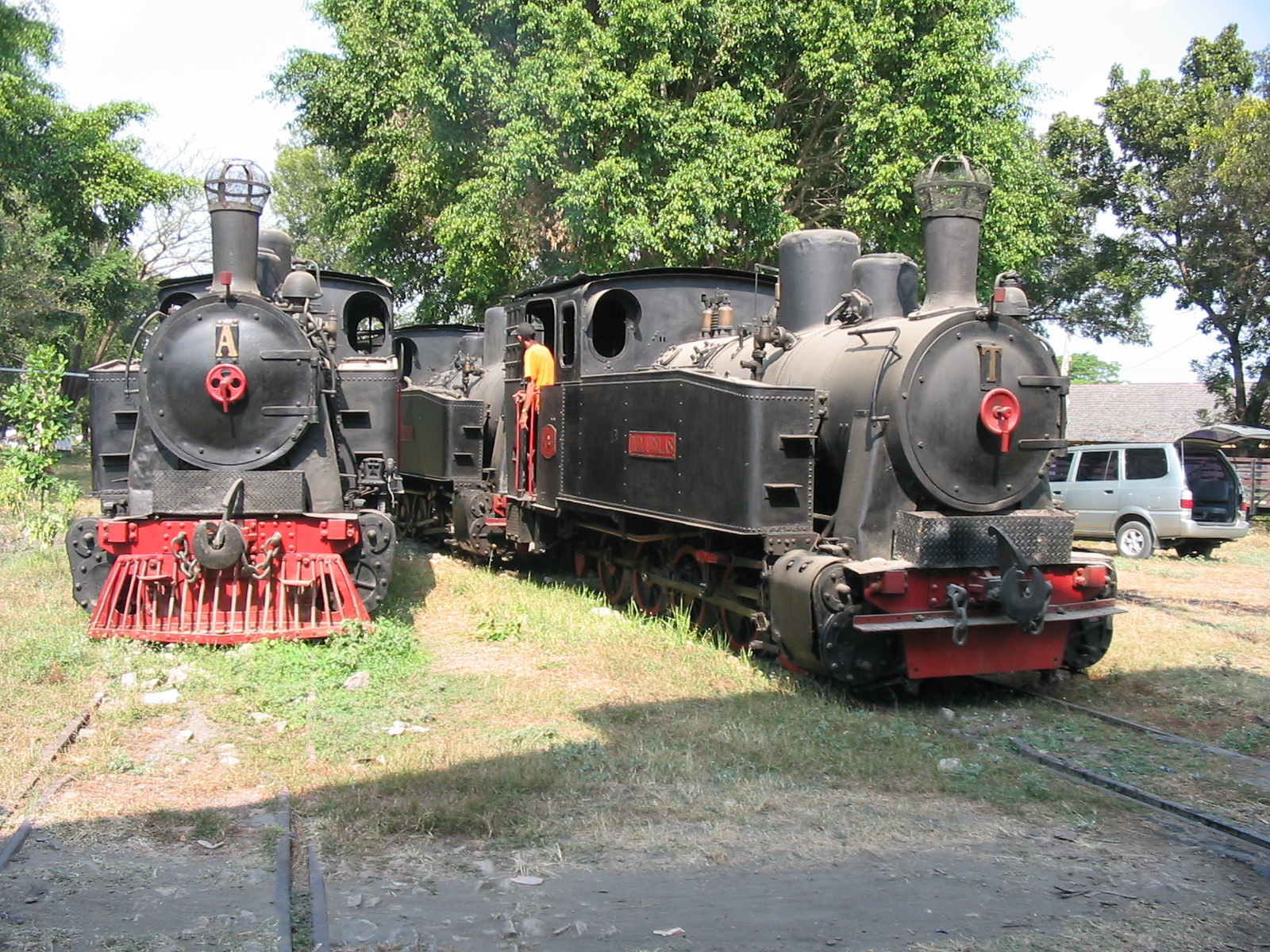
Three Berliner Maschinenbau steam locomotives on the Cepu Forest Railway in Central Java, Indonesia

The railway was originally constructed circa 1915 and was fully operational until the late 1990s, with over 300 kilometres (190 mi) of track in the Perhutani forests. Since 1998 much of the track has been lifted, but occasional logging trains continued to operate until 2002.

Since 2002 only chartered logging trains and a tourist train have been run (Loko Tour). The railway is popular with foreign tourists, especially from Europe, the United States and Japan. The main remaining line is of a distance of around 30 kilometres (19 mi) to an arboretum where there are spectacular 150-year-old teak trees along with a visitor centre where tourist train passengers are often entertained by local cultural shows.

In 2006 a bridge just outside Cepu was damaged by flooding. In late 2007 this was repaired, and tourist trains were restored to the arboretum in December 2007. Since then there have been numerous tours and chartered logging trains. There were also reportedly 'real' logging trains run early in 2010 when otherwise inaccessible trees brought down by storm damage were removed using steam trains.

Tours and charter trains are marketed and run by PT Palawi, a subsidiary of Perhutani, in Jakarta.

== Rolling stock ==
=== Steam locomotives ===
Class	Unit number	Image	Axles (Whyte)	Builder	Builder no.	Year built	Remarks
BMAG locomotives	Madjoe (M)		0-10-0T	(Weimar Republic) Berliner Maschinenbau	8834	1926	Preserved at Manggala Wanabakti Museum, Central Jakarta
BMAG locomotives	Augustus (A)		0-10-0T	(Weimar Republic) Berliner Maschinenbau	9408	1928	Non-operational as 2018
BMAG locomotives	Bahagia (B)		0-10-0T	(Weimar Republic) Berliner Maschinenbau	9409	1928	Non-operational
BMAG locomotives	Tudjubelas (T)		0-10-0T	(Weimar Republic) Berliner Maschinenbau	9410	1928	Non-operational as 2018
D&B locomotives	n/a		0-6-0T	(Netherlands) Du Croo & Brauns	388, 389, 390	1950	At least 2 units were preserved at the facility
C25	02		0-6-0Tr	(German Empire) Hanomag	6800	1913	Transferred from PJKA, derelict by 1987, presumably scrapped
C26	07		0-6-0T	(Weimar Republic) Henschel	18631	1921	Transferred from PJKA, derelict by 1987, presumably scrapped
C29	02		0-6-0T	(Weimar Republic) Hanomag	9790	1922	Transferred from PJKA, preserved as monument at Taman Seribu Lampu, Cepu

=== Diesel locomotives ===
Class	Unit number	Image	Builder	Builder no.	Year built	Remarks
Ruston LHT	n/a		(United Kingdom) Ruston & Hornsby	441931, n/a	1970s	1 unit operational, 1 unit derelict
