= Ngloram Airport =

Airport in Cepu, Central Java, Indonesia

Ngloram Airport Bandar Udara Ngloram
- IATA: CPF; ICAO: WARC

Summary
- Airport type: Public
- Owner: Indonesian Government
- Location: Cepu, Central Java, Indonesia
- Time zone: WIB (UTC+07:00)
- Elevation AMSL: 80 ft (24 m)
- Coordinates: 07°11′41″S 111°32′53″E

Map
- Location of the airport in Central Java

Runways
Direction	Length		Surface
Direction	ft	m	Surface
08/26	4,921	1,500	Asphalt

Ngloram Airport (IATA: CPF, ICAO: WARC formerly WRSC) is an airport in Cepu, Central Java, Indonesia.

In February 2018, the Ministry of Transportation announced that they had budgeted Rp 80 billion (US$6 million) to extend the airport's runway and to improve supporting facilities. There was a plan to rename the airport to Abdurrahman Wahid Airport, named after the former Indonesian 4th President and often hailed as the "Father of Indonesian Pluralism". Citilink inaugurated flights from Jakarta on 26 November 2021.

== Airlines and destinations ==
=== Passenger ===
As of June 2025, there are no scheduled flights operated at the airport. Up until 2023, Citilink operated a flight from Cepu to Jakarta and Surabaya using ATR-72-600.
