= Berliner Maschinenbau =

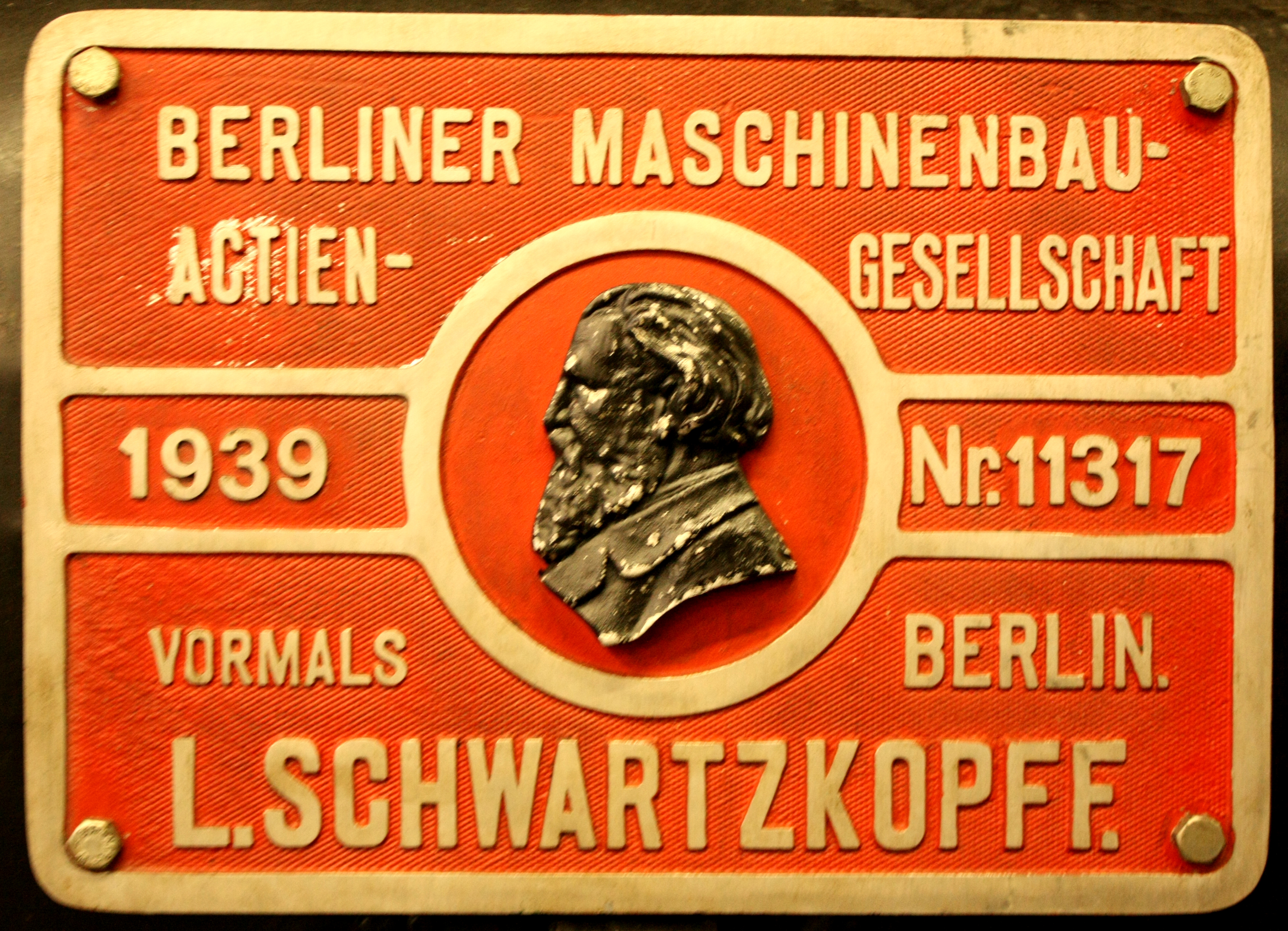
Company plate on a steam locomotive

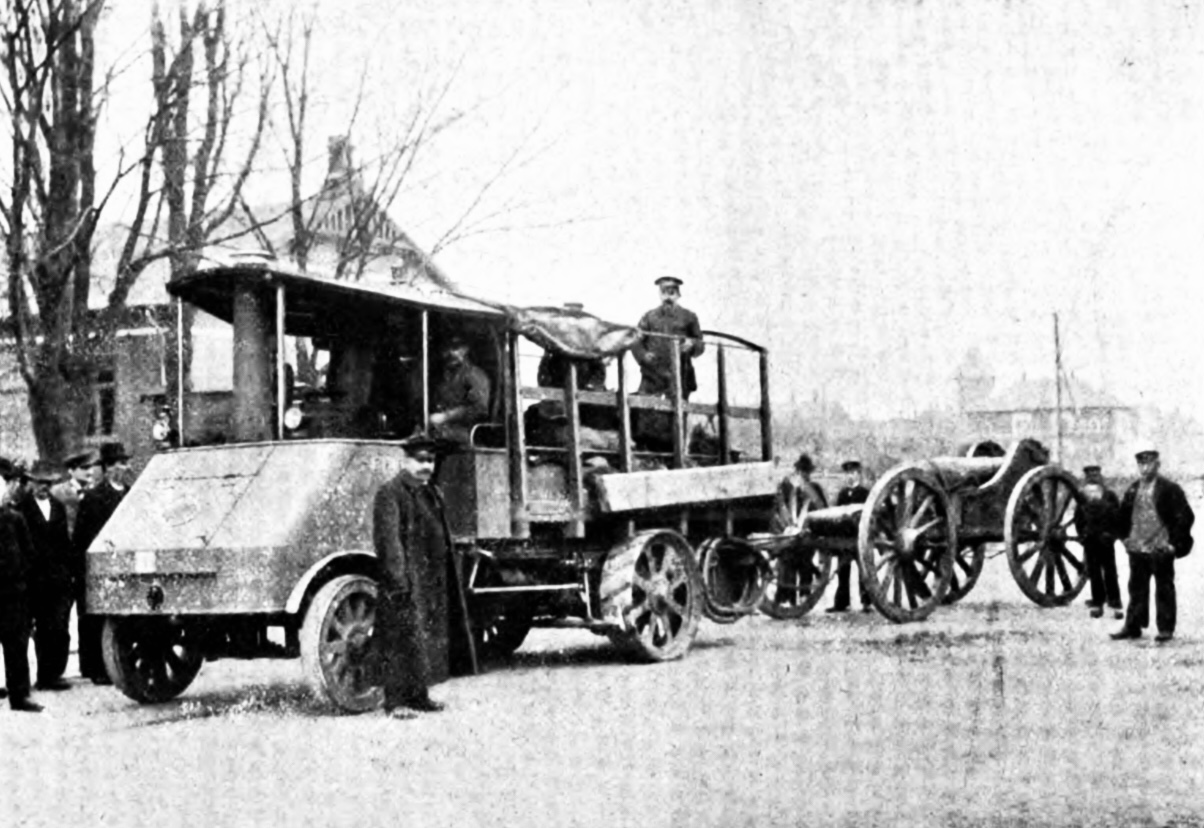
Berliner Maschinenbau-Actien-Gesellschaft vormals L. Schwartzkopff truck (1902)

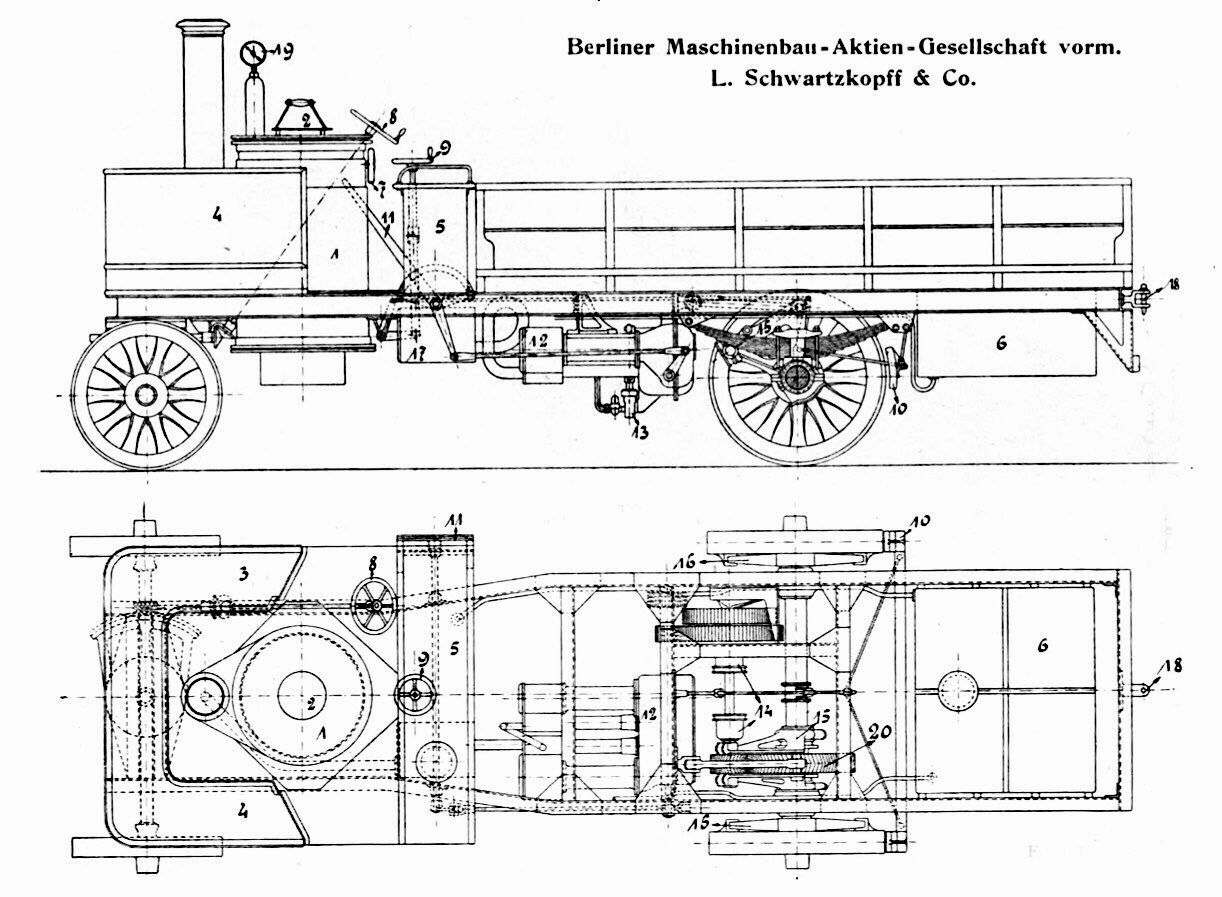
Berliner Maschinenbau-Actien-Gesellschaft vormals L. Schwartzkopff drawing truck (1902)

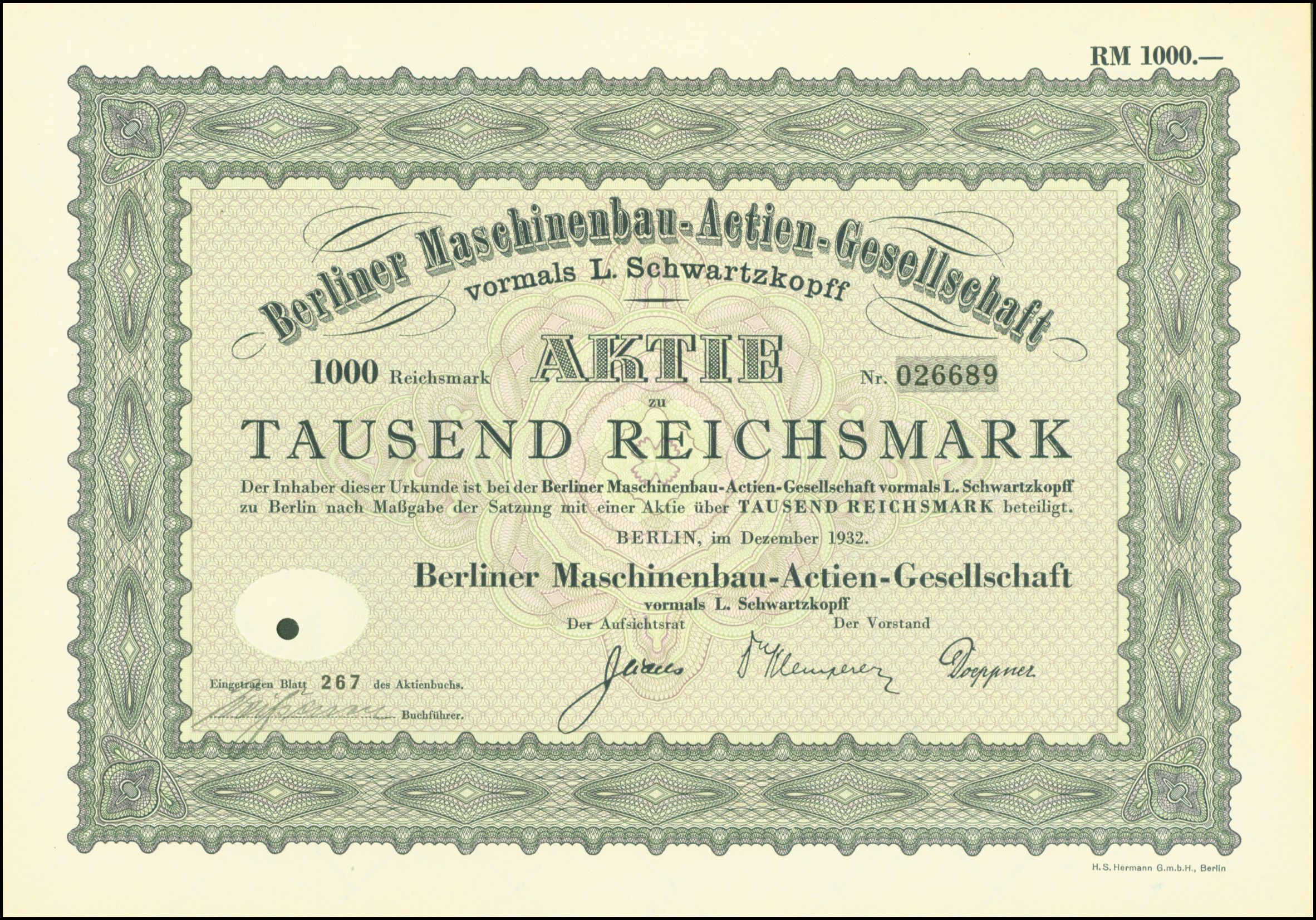
Share of the Berliner Maschinenbau-AG, issued December 1932

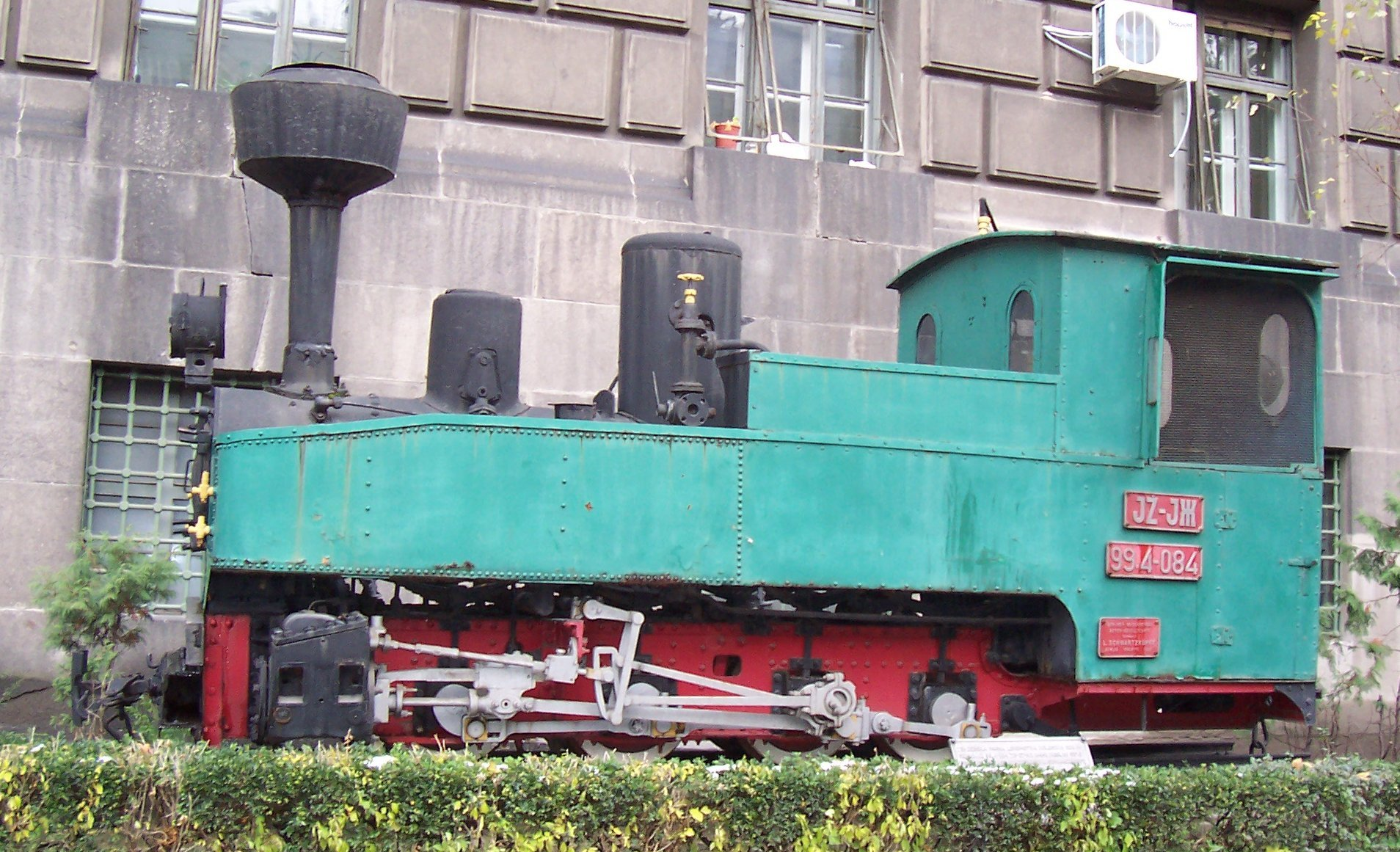
Maschinenfabrik L. Schwarzkopff DT-N 2 narrow gauge 0-8-0 steam locomotive.

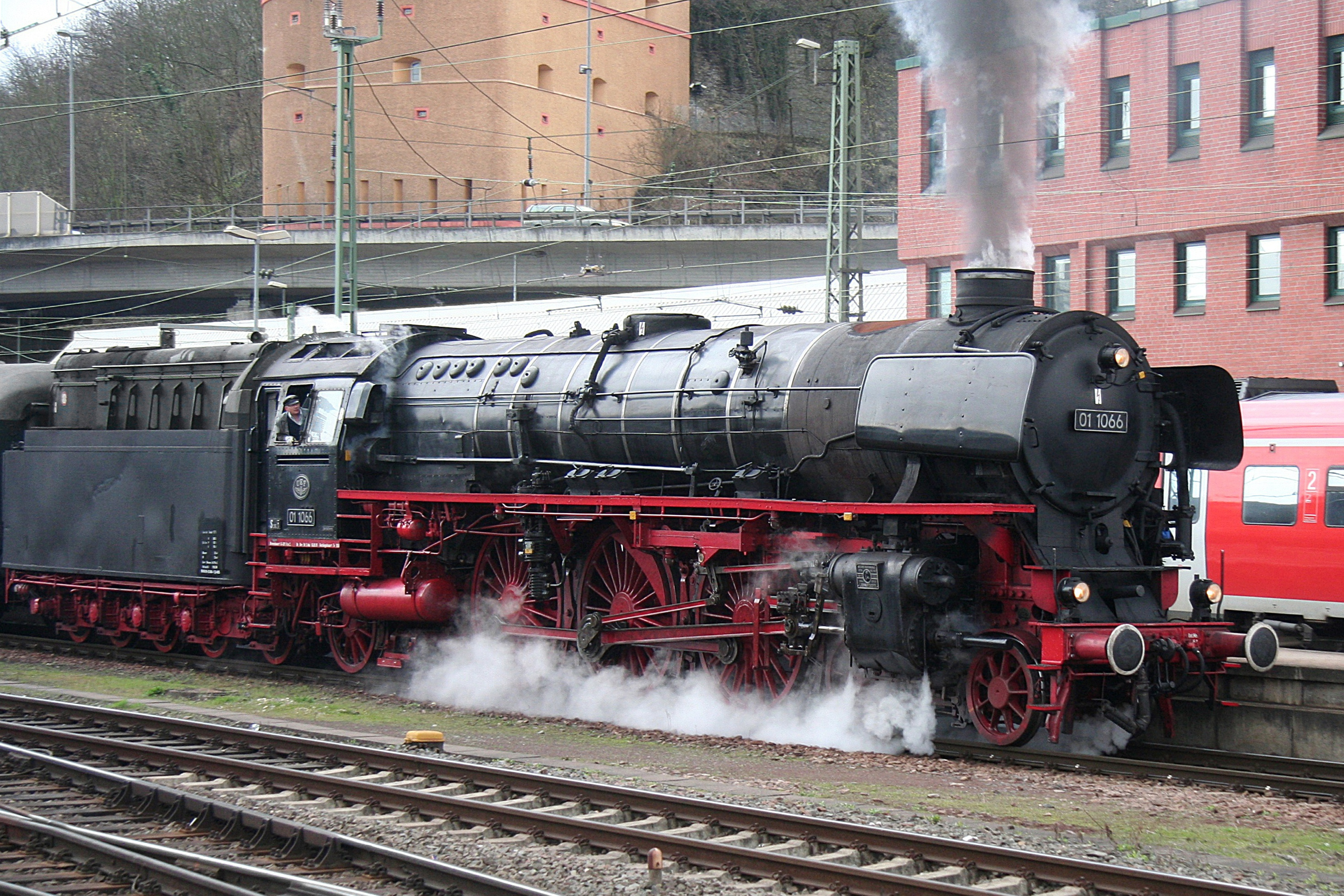
Locomotive 01 1066 in Koblenz

Berliner Maschinenbau AG was a German manufacturer of locomotives.

The factory was founded by Louis Victor Robert Schwartzkopff on 3 October 1852 as Eisengießerei und Maschinen-Fabrik von L. Schwartzkopff in Berlin.

== History ==
The factory was founded on 3 October 1852 as Eisengießerei und Maschinen-Fabrik von L. Schwartzkopff in Berlin by Louis Victor Robert Schwartzkopff. After a fire in 1860 and the expansion of the factory, they started to manufacture turntables, water systems and turnouts for several railway companies. The first locomotive built by the firm was delivered on 1 February 1867 to the Lower Silesian-Mark Railway (Niederschlesisch-Märkische Eisenbahn or NME). On 1 July 1870 the firm was turned into a share company and renamed the Berliner Maschinenbau-Actien-Gesellschaft vormals L. Schwartzkopff, Berlin. In 1897 a second factory was opened in Wildau. From 1899 the company also manufactured Linotype machines for the Mergenthaler factory in Berlin. On 4 July 1907 they started a joint venture with the Munich firm of Maffei. For that purpose the Maffei-Schwartzkopff-Werke GmbH was opened next to the existing factory in Wildau. It was here that the construction of electric locomotives and their equipment began in 1910. In 1924 diesel locomotives followed. In 1932 the Maffei-Schwartzkopff-Werke went bankrupt.

In 1945, following the destruction of the factory halls during the Second World War and the dismantling of other parts of the factory in Berlin and Wildau, the construction of locomotives by the Berliner Maschinenbau finally ended. On 20 September 1945 the production of cast iron components, linotype machines and glass-blowing machines started up in the remaining parts of the factory. In 1961 the tractor firm of Moorburger Treckerwerke was bought and its production changed. In 1966 the Berliner Maschinenbau was merged into the DIAG, the Deutsche(n) Industrieanlagen Gesellschaft mbH.

== Locomotive programme ==
The Berliner Maschinenbau was involved in the construction of the following locomotives:

- Cepu Forest Railway "Bahagia"
- Prussian P 4
- Prussian P 6
- Prussian P 8
- Prussian S 3
- Prussian S 10
- Prussian T 16
- DRG Class 01
- DRG Class 01.10 (including its design)
- DRG Class 03
- DRG Class 41 (including its design)
- DRG Class 43
- DRG Class 52
- DRG Class 71
- DRG Class 84 (including its design)
- DRG Class 89.0
- DRG Class 99.22
- DRG Class E 77
- DRG Class E 75
- Wehrmachtslokomotive WR 200 B 14
- Wehrmachtslokomotive WR 360 C 14
- Wehrmachtslokomotive WR 550 D 14
- JDŽ Class 398 (also known as JDŽ/JŽ Class 05)
- Staatsspoorwegen SS Class 500 (DKA/PNKA BB10) which was the first generation of mallet locomotive operated in West Java
- Staatsspoorwegen SS Class 520 (DKA CC10) as second generation of mallet locomotives
