= Kris =

Weapon from Maritime Southeast Asia

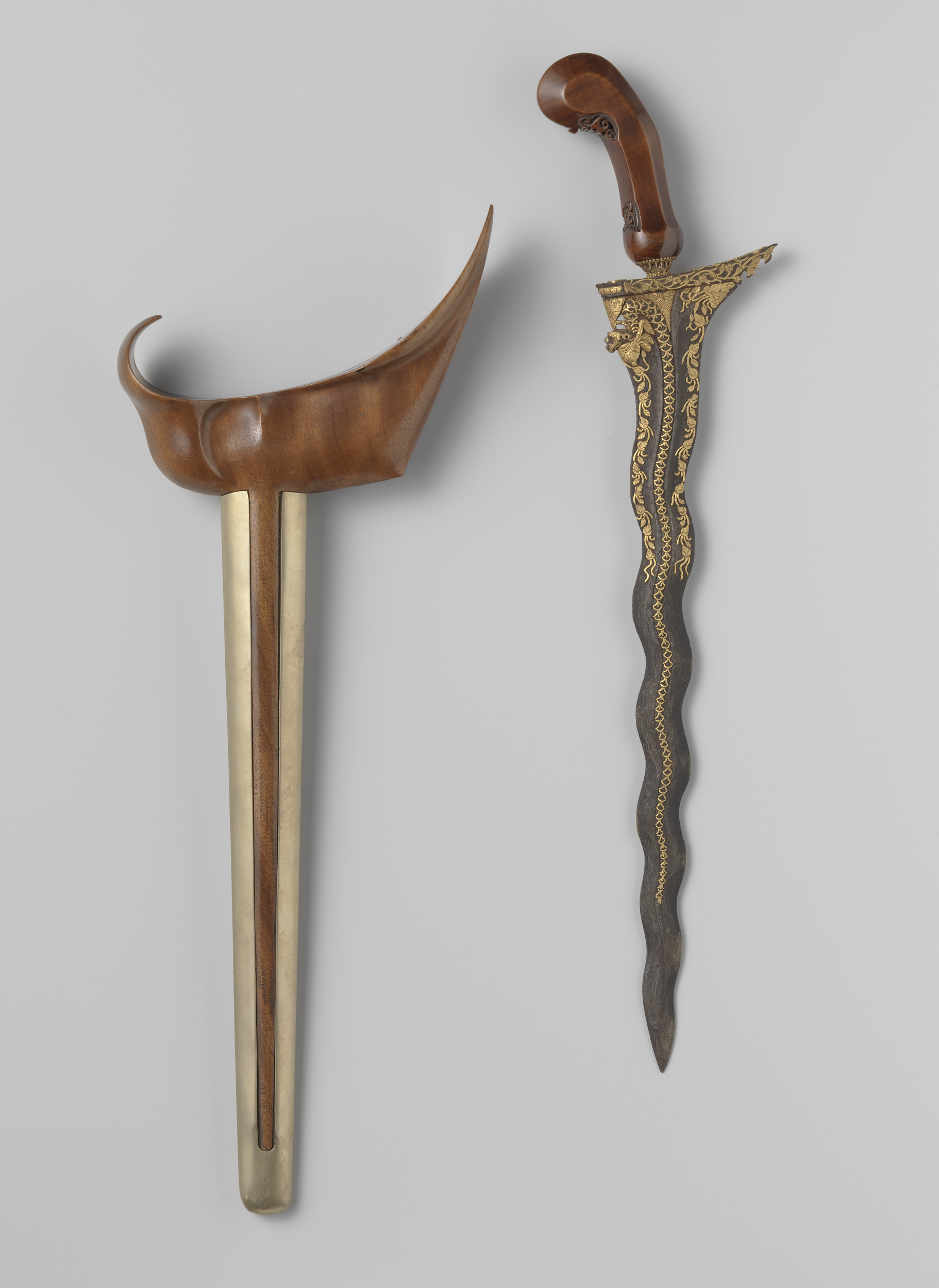
- The kris consists of three parts; blade (wilah), hilt (hulu) and sheath (warangka)
- Type: Dagger
- Place of origin: Java, Indonesia

Service history
- In service: Mataram kingdom, Singhasari Kingdom, Majapahit Empire, Sunda Kingdom, Malacca Sultanate, Demak Sultanate, Mataram Sultanate, Surakarta Sunanate, Yogyakarta Sultanate, Brunei Sultanate, Malay Peninsula, present day Indonesian archipelago
- Used by: Javanese (mainly and originally); Also familiar to Balinese, Sundanese, Malays, Banjar, Madurese, Buginese and Makassar
- Wars: Battle of Genter, Pamalayu expedition, Mongol invasion of Java, Battle of Bubat, Majapahit civil war, Siege of Batavia, Diponegoro War, Indonesian National Revolution

Production history
- Designer: Javanese people
- Variants: Kalis, Balasiong, Punyal (Gunong), Chundrik

Specifications
- Blade type: Double edged nickelous iron or steel
- Hilt type: Ivory, bone, horn, wooden or metals. Sometimes coated with gold or silver and decorated with gemstones
- Scabbard/sheath: Wooden frame covered and decorated with ivory or metals (gold, silver, copper, iron, brass, or steel)

Indonesian Kris
- UNESCO Intangible Cultural Heritage
- Country: Indonesia
- Reference: 00112
- Region: Asia and the Pacific

Inscription history
- Inscription: 2008 (3rd session)
- List: Representative

The kris or keris (Note: Javanese: ꦏꦼꦫꦶꦱ꧀, romanized: keris (in the ngoko register), ꦝꦸꦮꦸꦁ, dhuwung (in the krama register), ꦮꦁꦏꦶꦁꦔꦤ꧀, wangkingan (in the krama inggil vocabulary)); Balinese: ᬓᭂᬭᬶᬲ᭄ keris; Buginese: sele; Khmer: គ្រីស, romanized: kris; Malay: کريس; Minangkabau: karih; Sundanese: ᮊᮢᮤᮞ᮪; Tagalog: kalis; Thai: กริช, romanized: krit) is a Javanese asymmetrical dagger with a distinctive blade-patterning achieved through alternating laminations of iron and nickelous iron (pamor). The kris is famous for its distinctive wavy blade, although many have straight blades as well, and is one of the weapons commonly used in the pencak silat martial art native to Indonesia. Kris have been produced in many regions of Indonesia for centuries, but nowhere—although the island of Bali comes close—is the kris so embedded in a mutually-connected whole of ritual prescriptions and acts, ceremonies, storied backgrounds, and epic poetry as in Central Java. Within Indonesia the kris is commonly associated with Javanese culture, although other ethnicities in the surrounding regions are familiar with the weapon as part of their cultures, such as the Balinese, Sundanese, Malay, Madurese, Banjar, Buginese, and Makassar people. The kris itself is considered as a cultural symbol of Indonesia and also neighbouring countries like Malaysia, Brunei, Philippines, Singapore, and Thailand.

A kris can be divided into three parts: blade (bilah or wilah), hilt (hulu), and sheath (warangka). Each part of the kris is considered a piece of art, often carved in meticulous detail and (or) made from various materials: metal, precious or rare types of wood, or gold or ivory. A kris's aesthetic value covers the dhapur (the form and design of the blade, with around 60 variants), the pamor (the pattern of metal alloy decoration on the blade, with around 250 variants), and tangguh referring to the age and origin of a kris.

Both a weapon and spiritual object, kris are often considered to have an essence or presence, considered to possess magical powers, with some blades possessing good luck and others possessing bad. Kris are used for display, as talismans with magical powers, weapons, a sanctified heirloom (pusaka), auxiliary equipment for court soldiers, an accessory for ceremonial dress, an indicator of social status, a symbol of heroism, etc. Legendary kris that possess supernatural power and extraordinary ability were mentioned in traditional folktales, such as those of Empu Gandring, Taming Sari, and Setan Kober.

In 2005, UNESCO included the Indonesian kris in the Representative List of the Intangible Cultural Heritage of Humanity.

== Etymology ==
The word kris come from the Old Javanese term which means "dagger". In Javanese, kris is known as keris (ꦏꦼꦫꦶꦱ꧀) in the ngoko register, dhuwung (ꦝꦸꦮꦸꦁ) in the krama register, and wangkingan (ꦮꦁꦏꦶꦁꦔꦤ꧀) in the krama inggil vocabulary. In Malay (subsequently Indonesian and Malaysian), Sundanese, Balinese and Sasak, it is spelled keris (Pegon and Jawi: کريس). Other names include karih in Minangkabau, and sele (ᨔᨙᨒᨙ) in Buginese and Makassarese.

Two notable exceptions are the Philippines and Thailand. In the Philippines, the kris and similar stabbing daggers are known as gunong or gulok, while the much larger slashing sword versions are known as kalis or sundang. The larger kalis sword was introduced from the Sulu Sultanate of the Philippines back to Kalimantan and Sulawesi in Indonesia, where it became known as keris Sulu.

In Thailand it is always spelled kris and pronounced either as kris or krit (กริช) in Thai, while in the Yala dialect, it is spelled kareh. In Cambodia it is spelled as kris (គ្រីស) in Khmer. Other alternative spellings used by Europeans include "cryse", "crise", "criss", "kriss" and "creese". In English, the plural form is often simply "kris" as well.

== History ==
=== Origin ===
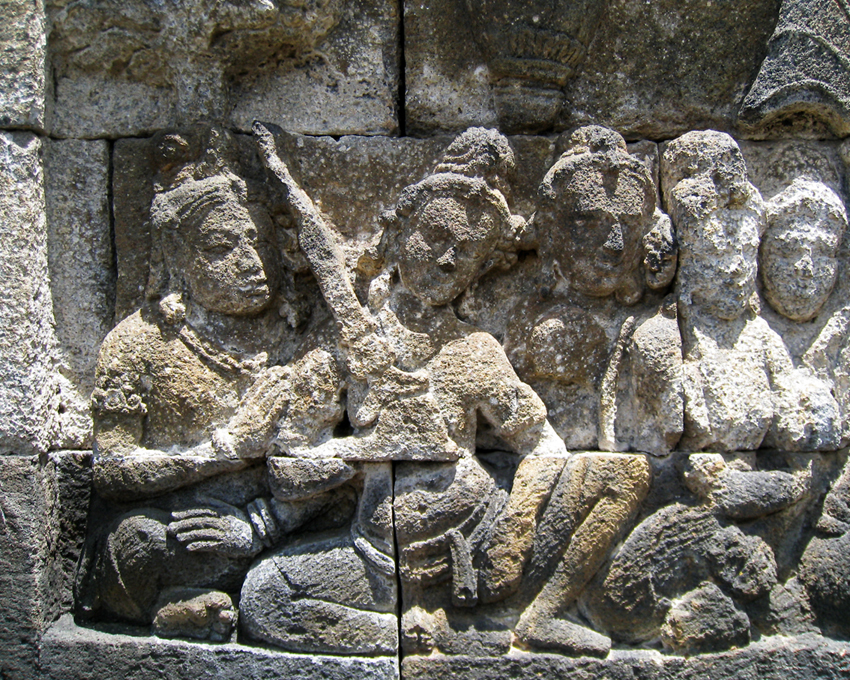
Possible kris depicted on 9th-century Borobudur bas-relief

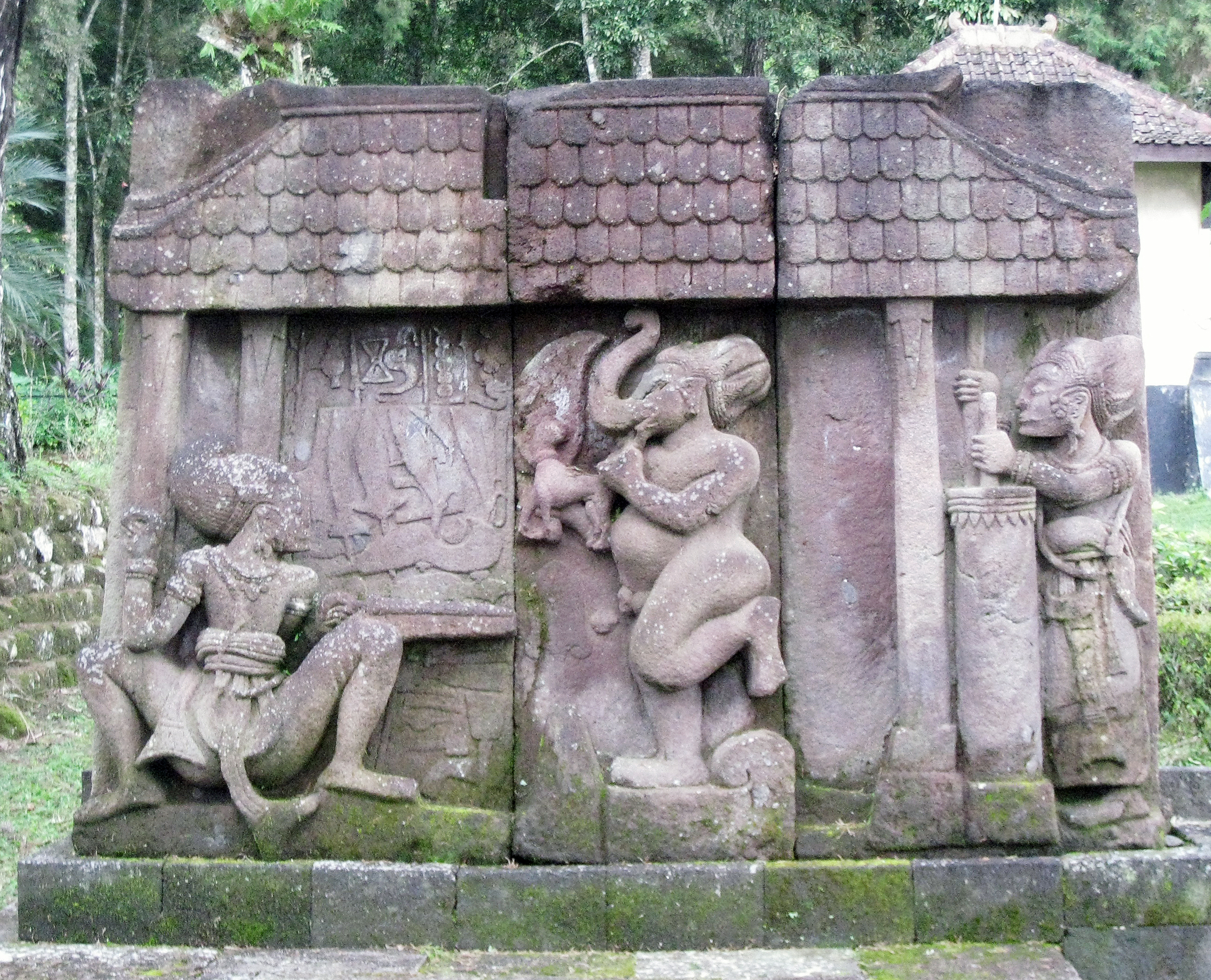
Kris blacksmith's workshop depicted in 15th-century Candi Sukuh

(850).

The description of a small dagger from Java reminiscent of kris can be found in Chinese source from the 10th century Song dynasty. In 992 the envoy from She-po (Java) arrived in Chinese court bearing a lot of gifts, consists of a dagger with exquisite hilt made of rhino horn and gold, silk woven with floral motifs made of gold threads, ivories, pearls, silk of various colours, fragrant sandalwood, cotton clothes of various colours, turtle shells, betel nut preparation kit, rattan mat with the image of white cockatoo, and a small model of house made of sandalwood adorned with valuable ornaments.

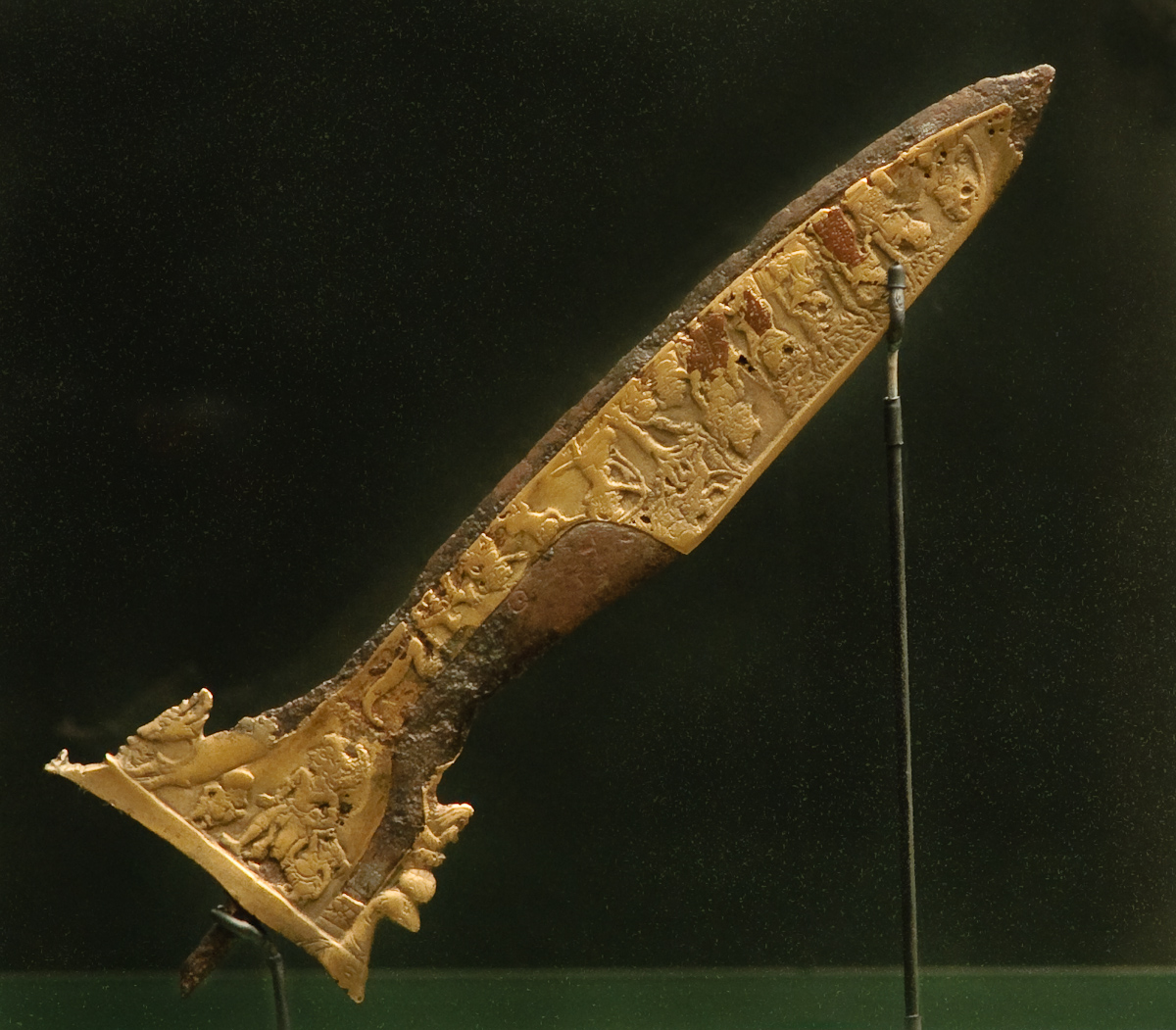
The Kris of Knaud (1342 CE) from Majapahit period, exhibited at Tropenmuseum in Amsterdam

However, Sir Stamford Raffles' (1817) study of the Candi Sukuh states that the kris recognized today came into existence around 1361 CE in the kingdom of Majapahit, East Java. The scene in bas relief of Sukuh Temple in Central Java, dated from the 15th century Majapahit era, shows the workshop of a Javanese keris blacksmith. The scene depicted Bhima as the blacksmith on the left forging the metal, Ganesha in the center, and Arjuna on the right operating the piston bellows to blow air into the furnace. The wall behind the blacksmith displays various items manufactured in the forge, including kris. These representations of the kris in the Candi Sukuh established the fact that by the year 1437, the kris had already gained an important place within Javanese culture.

In Yingya Shenglan—a record about Zheng He's expedition (1405–1433)—Ma Huan describes that

all men in Majapahit, from the king to commoners, from a boy aged three to elders, slipped pu-la-t'ou (belati or more precisely kris dagger) in their belts. The daggers are made entirely of steel with intricate motifs smoothly drawn. The handles are made of gold, rhino's horn or ivory carved with a depiction of a human or demon; the carving works are exquisite and skillfully made.

This Chinese account also reported that public execution by stabbing using this type of dagger is common. Majapahit knows no caning for major or minor punishment. They tied the guilty men's hands in the back with rattan rope and paraded them for a few paces, and then stabbed the offender one or two times in the back on the gap between the floating ribs, which resulted in severe bleeding and instant death.

Currently, the Kris of Knaud is the oldest known surviving kris in the world. Given to Charles Knaud, a Dutch physician, by Paku Alam V in the 19th century Yogyakarta in Java, the kris is on display at the Tropenmuseum, Amsterdam. The kris bears the date of 1264 Saka (which corresponds to 1342 CE) in its iron blade. Scientists suspect that due to its special features, the kris might be even older, but was decorated during Majapahit period to celebrate an important event. The kris bears scenes from the Ramayana on an unusually thin copper layer which partially covers it.

=== Development and distribution ===
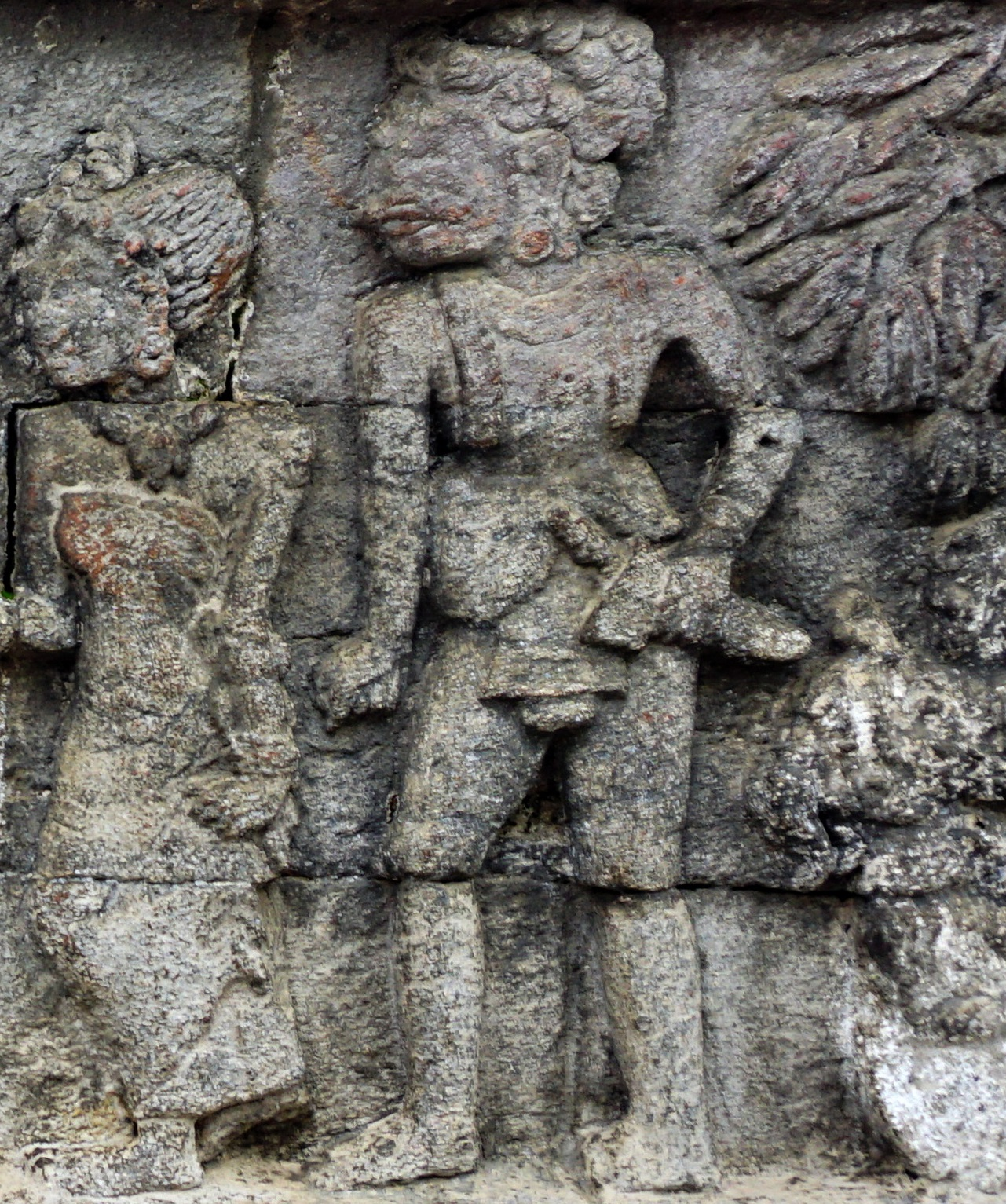
A kris depicted on the Panataran temple relief. From the main temple bears the date of 1269 saka or 1347 CE.

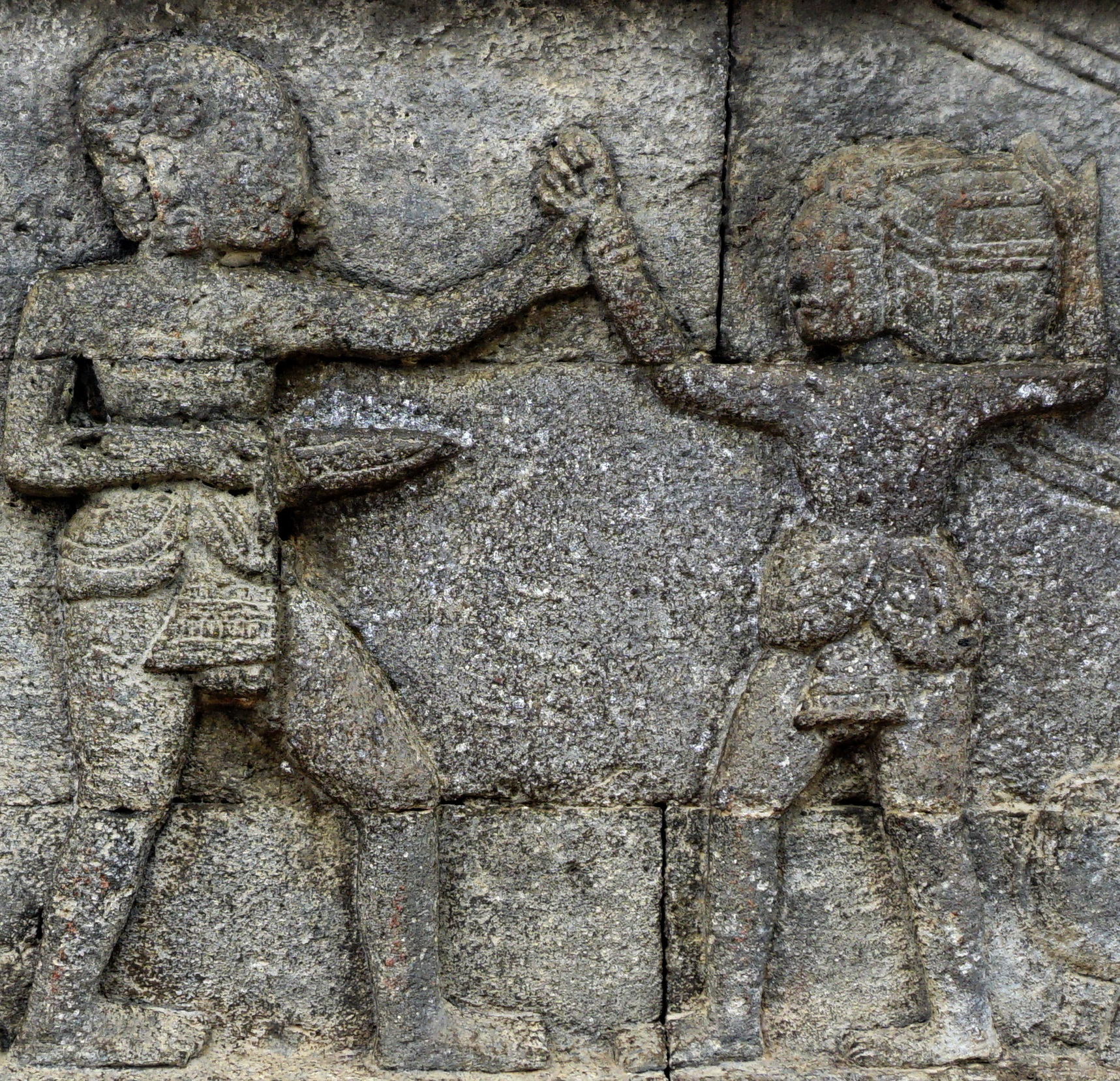
An unseathed kris on the Panataran temple relief

Although the people of Southeast Asia were already familiar with this type of stabbing weapon, the development of the kris most probably took place in Java, Indonesia. From its origin in Java, the use of kris spread throughout the Indonesian archipelago, Singapore, Malaysia, Southern Thailand and the Philippines through diplomacy and trade. The spread of the kris to other nations such as Thailand, Malaysia and the Philippines, some historians say, was credited to the growing influence of the Majapahit Empire in Java around the year 1492.

The Sanghyang Siksa Kandang Karesian canto XVII, a Sundanese manuscript dated from Saka 1440 or 1518 CE, describes the kris as the weapon of kings, while the kujang is the weapon of farmers. There exist claims of earlier forms predating the Majapahit kris, but none are verifiable. In the past, the majority of kris had straight blades, but this became less frequent over time. Tomé Pires, in the early 16th century, describes the importance of the kris to the Javanese.

=== Usage ===
While it is commonly believed that kris were the primary weapons wielded by fighters in the past, they were actually carried by warriors as a secondary armament if they lost their main weapon, which was usually a spear. For commoners, however, kris were worn daily, especially when travelling, because it might be needed for self-defense. During times of peace, people wore kris as part of their ceremonial attire. Ceremonial kris were often meticulously decorated with intricate carving in gold and precious stones. Heirloom blades were handed down through successive generations and worn during special events such as weddings and other ceremonies. Men usually wore only one kris, but the admiral Hang Tuah is said in the Hikayat Hang Tuah to have armed himself with one short and one long kris. Women also wore kris, though usually of a smaller size than a man's. In battle, a fighter might have carried more than one kris; some carried three kris: his own, one from his father-in-law, and one as a family heirloom. The extra two served as parrying daggers, but if none were available, the sheath would serve the same purpose.

Kris were often broken in battle and required repairs. Yearly cleanings, known in Javanese tradition as jamasan, is required as part of the spirituality and mythology surrounding the weapon, often leaving ancient blades worn and thin. The repair materials depended on location, and it is quite usual to find a weapon with fittings from several areas. For example, a kris may have a blade from Java, a hilt from Bali and a sheath from Madura.

... every man in Java, whether he is rich or poor, must have a kris in his house ... and no man between the ages of 12 and 80 may go out of doors without a kris in his belt. They carry them at the back, as daggers used to be in Portugal ...

— Tome Pires, Suma Oriental

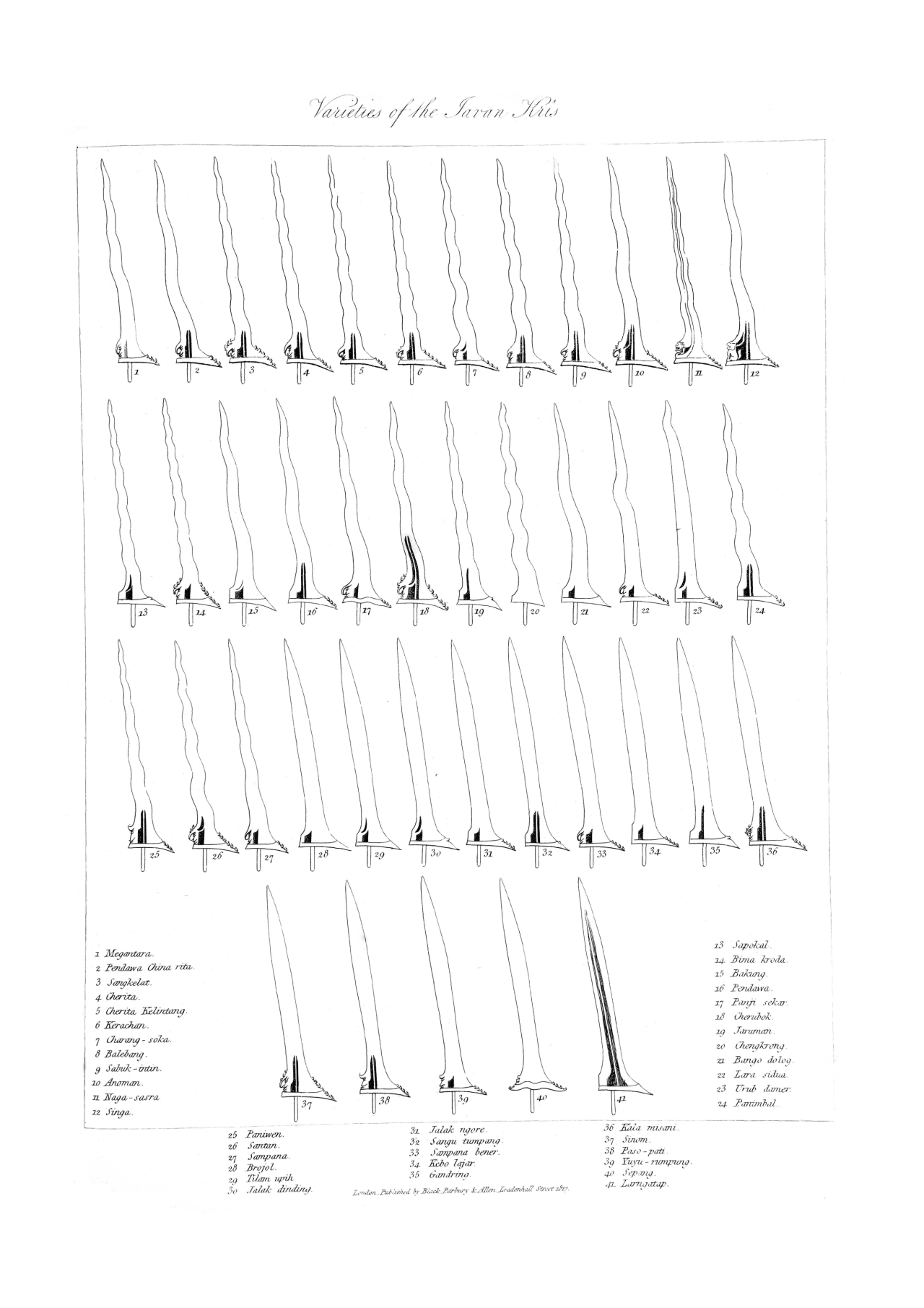
Varieties of Javanese keris, The History of Java, by Thomas Stamford Raffles (1817)

In many parts of Indonesia and the Malacca Sultanate, the kris used to be the choice weapon for an execution known as the hukuman salang. The executioner's kris had a long, straight, slender blade. The condemned knelt before the executioner, who placed a wad of cotton or similar material on the subject's shoulder or clavicle area. The blade was thrust through the padding, piercing the subclavian artery and the heart. Upon withdrawal, the cotton wiped the blade clean. In the Malay world and Java, an honourable form of execution was death by kris to the heart.

Kris were used commonly in battle during the early modern period, instead of having professional armies, most kings within the region relied on their courtiers to mobilize for war whenever required and since most Javanese, Malay and Makassarese would own a kris, the weapon would have seen regular combat. During amok, the kris was used in a furious charge to scatter or kill a number of enemies even at the cost of one's own life.

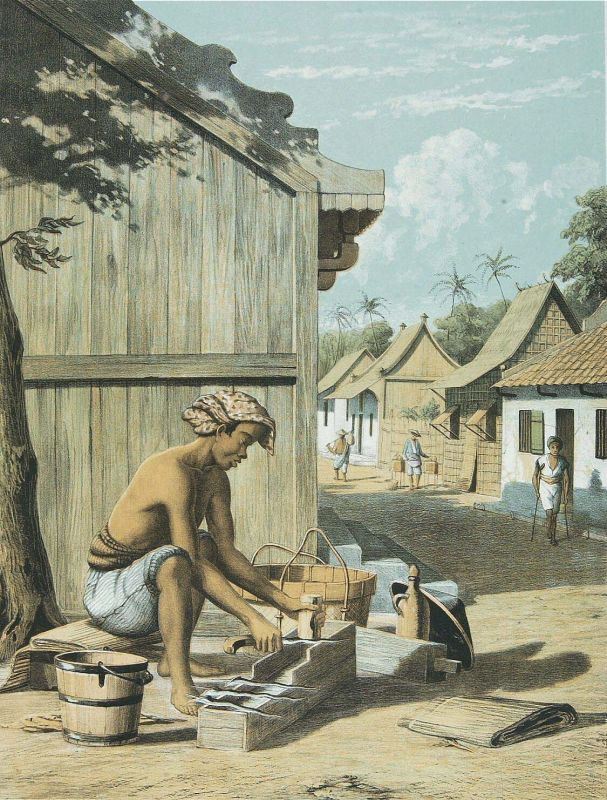
A lithograph depiction of kris blacksmith in Java, Dutch East Indies, c. 1854

In the 16th century, European colonial powers introduced firearms into the archipelago that contributed to the decline of using the kris as the weapon of choice in battle. The forging of edged weapons went into decline from the moment that the sultans or rajas were subjugated and their realms annexed by the British or Dutch East Indies colonial state. In some regions, a ban was placed on carrying of cutting and stabbing weapons.

In Java, the turning point was the end of the five-year-long Java War when the rebellious Prince Diponegoro was defeated and detained and had to hand his kris over to the Dutch in 1830. This event marked the disarmament of the kris as a combat weapon among the Javanese populace. Its ceremonial function, however, as part of traditional costumes, as sacred heirloom and as a protective personal amulet, remains.

However, the kris saw continuous use and forging in the Philippines, which comprised most of the Spanish East Indies. Kris-forgers and swordsmen were referred to as juramentados by the Spanish. Juramentados practice a ritual of sacrifice, a form of Jihad against not only Spanish soldiers but also against Christian Filipinos alike.

The early 20th century saw the decline of kris forging as carrying edged weapons was banned in the Dutch East Indies. However its spiritual and ceremonial function still continues and is celebrated mainly in kraton and istana (courts) throughout Indonesia, Malaysia and the Muslim-inhabited parts of the southern Philippines.

=== Today ===
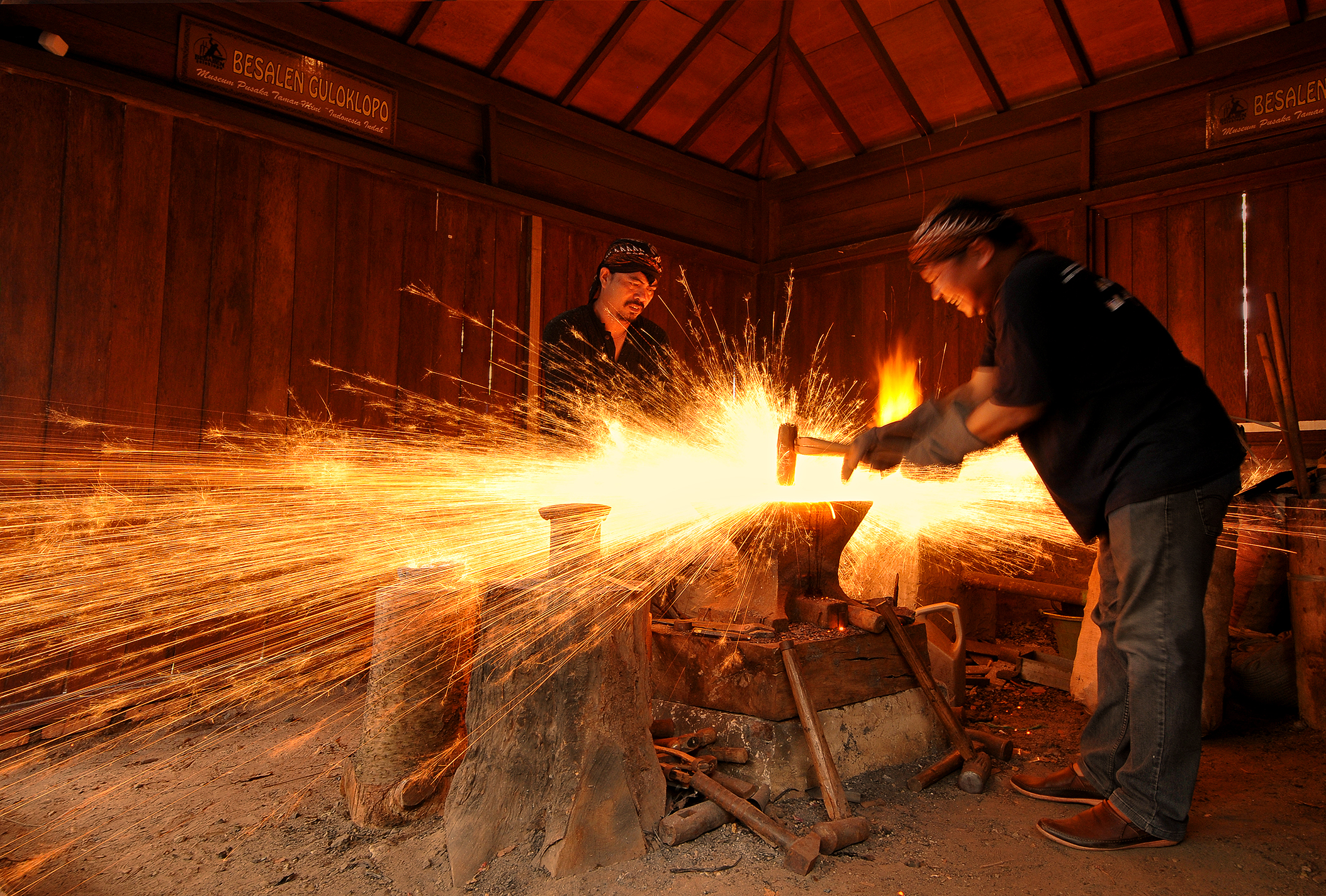
Kris-making in Jakarta

In Java, the traditional art of kris-making is preserved in the Javanese culture heartland, the keraton (royal court) of Yogyakarta and Surakarta, and also the princedom of Mangkunegaran and Pakualaman. The Javanese kings and nobles of these courts are known to employ some kris blacksmiths (empu) and become the patrons of their works, although the activity of kris-making is declining. Until the 1990s, kris-making activities in Java had almost come to a standstill due to economic difficulties and changing socio-cultural values. However, thanks to several concerned kris experts, the tradition is being revived, and kris craftsmanship has increased again.

Over the past three decades, kris have lost their prominent social and spiritual meaning in society. Although active and honoured smiths who traditionally produce high-quality kris can still be found in some places such as Madura, Surakarta, Yogyakarta, Makassar and Palembang, their number is dramatically decreasing, and it is more difficult for them to find successors to whom they may transmit their skills. The traditional kris-making industry still survives in some villages, such as Banyu Sumurup village in Imogiri subdistrict, Bantul, Yogyakarta, either specially made as a sacred amulet ordered by a kris enthusiast who seeks its spiritual power, or merely as souvenirs for tourists.

== Description ==
Physically, the kris is a form of dagger with a blade measuring between 15 and 50 in (38 and 127 cm) long, typically not sharpened as it is meant for stabbing and tearing, broader and asymmetric shape near the hilt, made of a combination of several kinds of metals. A kris's aesthetic value covers the dhapur (the form and design of the blade, with around 150 variants), the pamor (the pattern of metal alloy decoration on the blade, with around 60 variants), and tangguh referring to the age and origin of a kris.

=== Blade ===
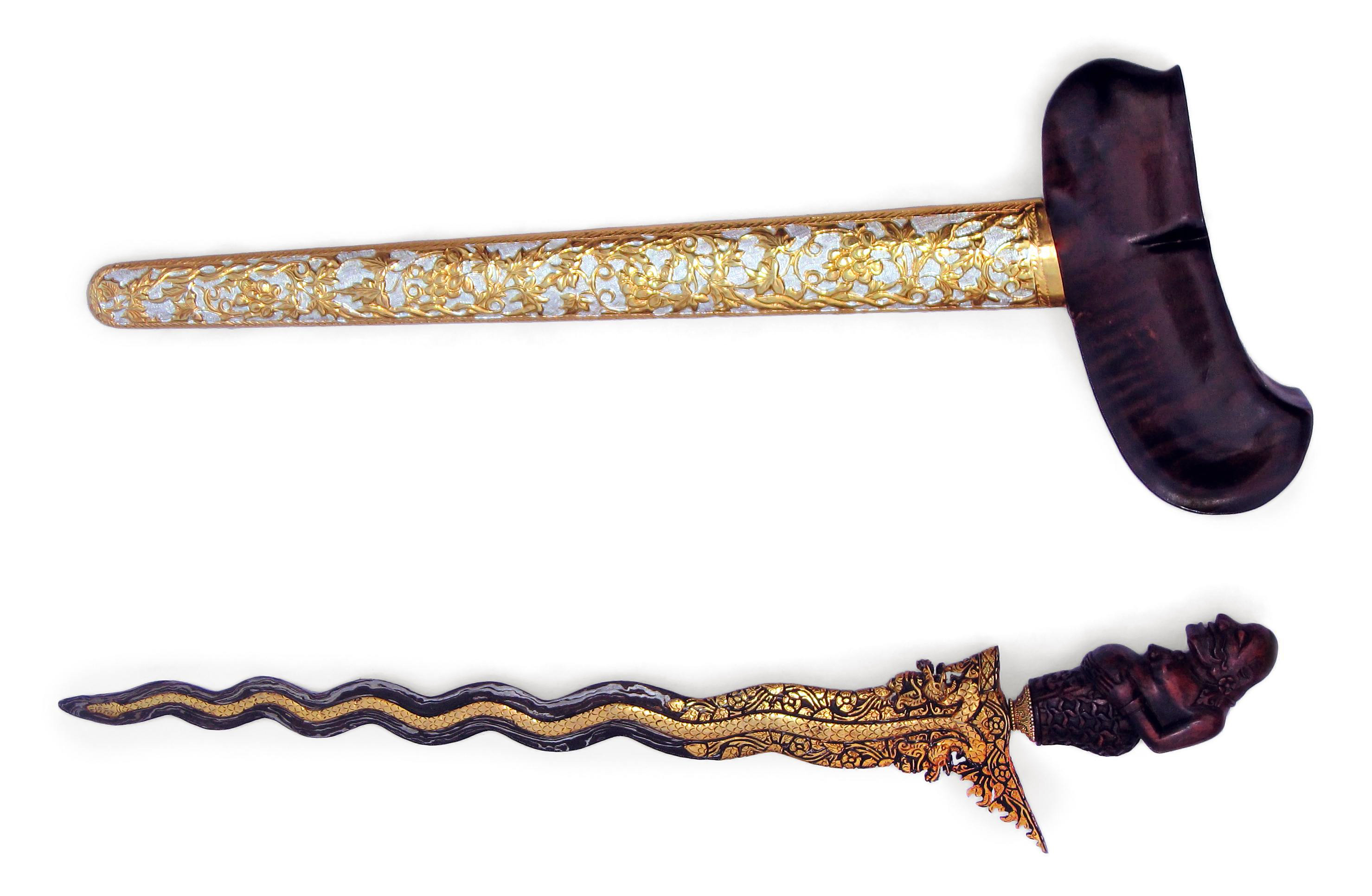
A decorative kris with a figure of Semar as the handle. The blade has thirteen luk.

The kris blade is called a wilah or bilah. Kris blades are usually narrow with a wide, asymmetrical base, one rare kind of kris with a broad blade is the keris buah beko in Kelantan and Java copying the shape of the oroxylum seed pod. The kris is famous for its wavy blade; however, older types of kris dated from the Majapahit era have straight blades, as do more than half of all kris prior to the modern era. The number of curves on the blade (known as luk or lok) is always odd. Common numbers of luk range from three to thirteen waves, but some blades have up to 29. In contrast to the older straight type, most kris today have a wavy blade which is supposed to increase the severity of wounds inflicted upon a victim.

According to traditional Javanese kejawen, kris contain all the intrinsic elements of nature: tirta (water), bayu (wind), agni (fire), bantolo (earth, but also interpreted as metal or wood which both come from the earth), and aku (lit: "I" or "me", meaning that the kris has a spirit or soul). All these elements are present during the forging of kris. Earth is metal forged by fire being blown by pumped wind, and water to cool down the metal. In Bali, the kris is associated with the nāga or dragon, which also symbolizes irrigation canals, rivers, springs, wells, spouts, waterfalls and rainbows; thus, the wavy blade symbolizes the movement of the serpent. Some kris have the head of a naga (dragon) carved near the base with the body and tail following the curves of the blade to the tip. A wavy kris is thus a naga in motion, aggressive and alive; a straight blade is one at rest, its power dormant but ready to come into action.

In former times, kris blades were said to be infused with poison during their forging, ensuring that any injury was fatal. The poison used to polish kris blade is called warangan. The process of chemical coating was done by warangan or jamas (washing) the blade with acid and minerals that contains arsenic compounds. The process of doing so was kept secret among smiths. Different types of whetstones, the acidic juice of citrus fruits and poisonous arsenic bring out the contrast between the dark black iron and the light colored silvery nickel layers, which together form pamor, damascene patterns on the blade.

=== Pamor ===
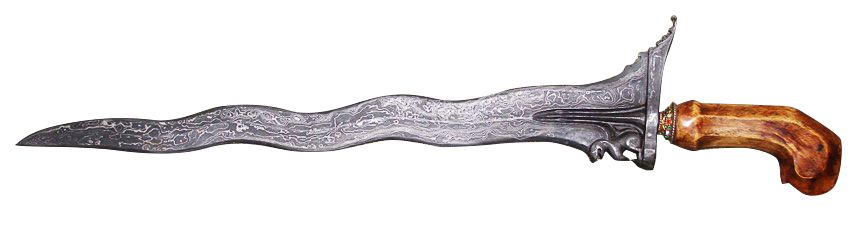
The shiny nickelous pattern (pamor) on dark iron background visible on kris' blade

The distinctive pamor patterns have specific meanings and names which indicate the mythical properties they are believed to impart. There are around 60 variants of pamor recognized today in traditional kris blades. Some examples of pamor include beras wutah, udan mas, kembang kacang, kembang pala and ladrang cendan. The kris blade forging uses iron with a small content of nickel to create this pattern. The faint pamor pattern has been found in the kris from Majapahit period, which was acquired from iron ores with small nickel content. Most probably this iron ore was imported from the island of Sulawesi, as the pamor Luwu from Luwu region is quite well known in Sulawesi and Java.

The best material for creating pamor, however, is acquired in a quite unusual way, as it is made from rare meteorite iron. Traditionally, the pamor material for the kris smiths connected with the courts of Yogyakarta and Surakarta originates from an iron meteorite that fell to earth at the end of the 18th century in the neighborhood of the Prambanan temple complex. The meteorite was excavated and transported to the keraton of Surakarta; from that time on the smiths of Vorstenlanden (the Royal territories) used small pieces of meteoric iron to produce pamor patterns in their kris, pikes, and other status weapons. After etching the blade with acidic substances, it is the small percentage of nickel present in meteoric iron that creates the distinctive silvery patterns that faintly light up against the dark background of iron or steel that become darkened by the effect of the acids.

=== Hilt ===
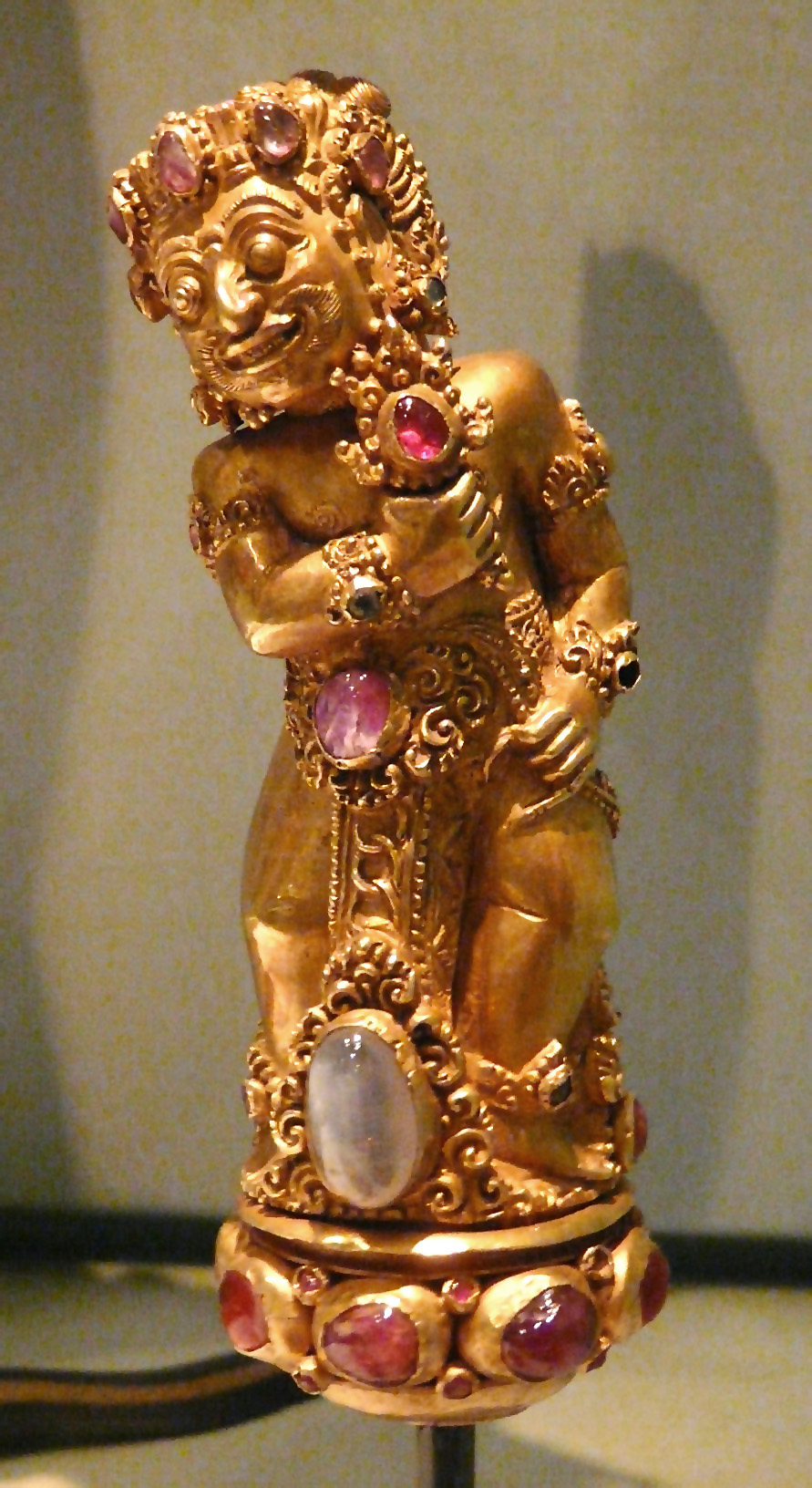
Richly decorated Balinese kris hilt coated with gold, adorned with rubies

The handle or hilt (hulu) is an object of art, often carved in meticulous detail and made from various materials: precious rare types of wood to gold or ivory. They were often carved to resemble various animals and Hindu deities, although this became less common with the introduction of Islam. In Bali, kris handles are made to resemble demons coated in gold and adorned with semi-precious and precious stones, such as rubies. In Java, kris handles are made in various types, the most common design being the abstract stylized representation of the human form. Examples of hilt designs include Tunggak Semi Putri Kinurung hilt from Surakarta, Batara Guru and Pulasir hilt from Madura, Punukan hilt from Palembang, Ratmaja from Bali, Pulungan hilt from Cirebon, Pekaka hilt from Pattani, and a seabird-like hilt from Lampung and Sulawesi. The kris usually has a curved pistol-grip hilt that aids in stabbing strikes. It allows the palm of the holding hand to add pressure to the blade while stabbing. A kris only offers minimal protection for the hand by the broad blade at the hilt.

=== Sheath ===
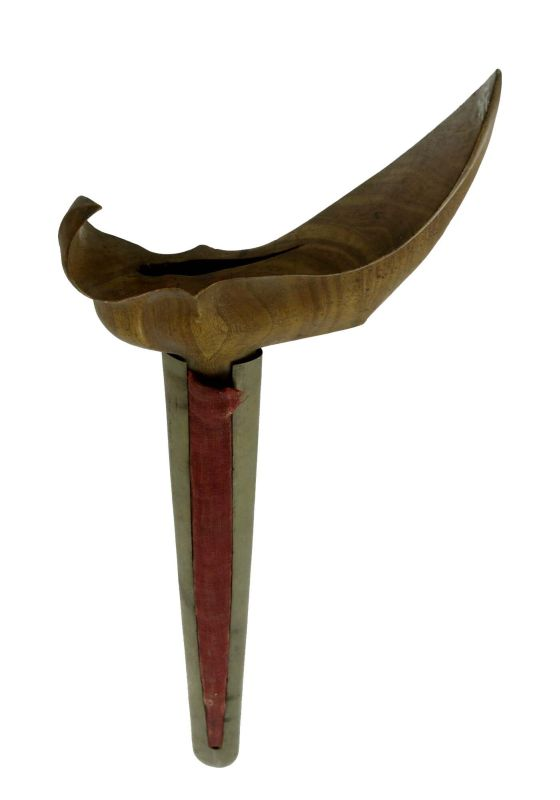
Kris sheath of Ladrang Surakarta style

As with the hilt, a kris' sheath (warangka) is also an object of art. It can be made from various materials, usually a wooden frame to hold the blade which can be coated with metals such as brass, iron, silver, or even gold, usually carved in sulur floral motifs. The upper part of the sheath formed a broad, curved handle made from wood or sometimes ivory. It could be adorned with precious or semi-precious stones.

== Forging ==
The making of a kris was the specialised duty of metalworkers called empu (lit. "possessor") or pandai besi (lit. "iron-skilled"). In Java, the honorary title empu refers to those ironsmiths who possess the special skill of forging the kris. According to Javanese beliefs, a kris empu should possess knowledge, technical skills and also spiritual prowess, since kris are believed to have physical and spiritual presence. This was meant to differentiate the masters from common pandai besi that mostly create common metal tools or peasant's weapons like parang or golok. In old Majapahit, a kris bladesmith was referred to as pande and all were reputed to be able to work hot iron with their bare hands. The people of Majapahit would eventually flee to Bali where the occupation has been preserved by the Pande clan to this day, members of whom also make jewellery. A bladesmith makes the blade in layers of different iron ores and meteorite nickel. Some blades can be made in a relatively short time, while more intricate weapons take years to complete. In high-quality kris blades, the metal is folded dozens or hundreds of times and handled with the utmost precision. Empu are highly respected craftsmen with additional knowledge in literature, history, and the occult.

== Culture ==
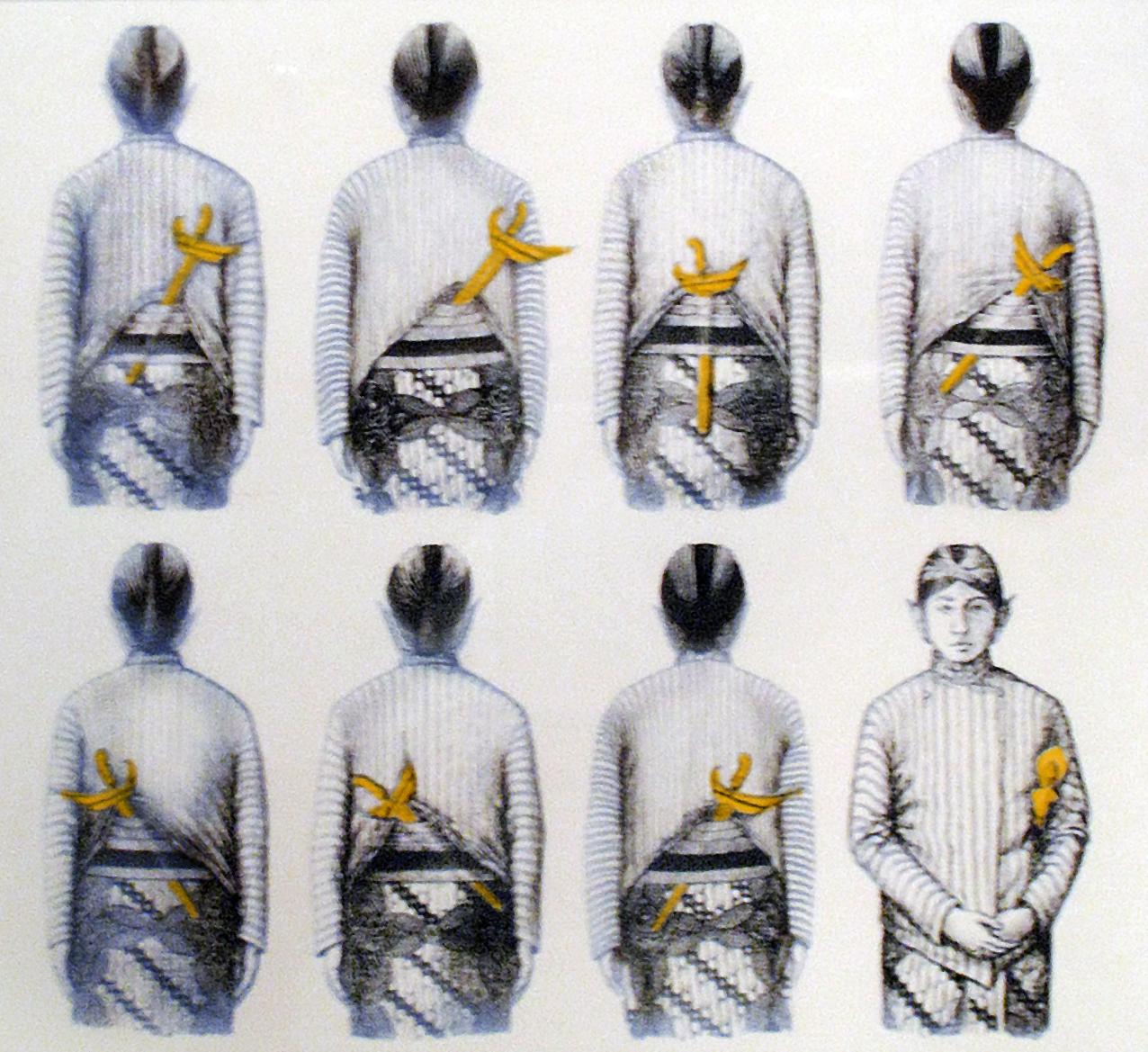
Various ways of wearing kris in Javanese culture

Kris were worn at special ceremonies, with heirloom blades being handed down through successive generations. Both men and women might wear them, though those for women are smaller. A rich spirituality and mythology developed around the weapon. Kris are used for display, as talismans with magical powers, as weapons, sanctified heirloom, auxiliary equipment for court soldiers, as an accessory for ceremonial dress, an indicator of social status, a symbol of heroism, etc.

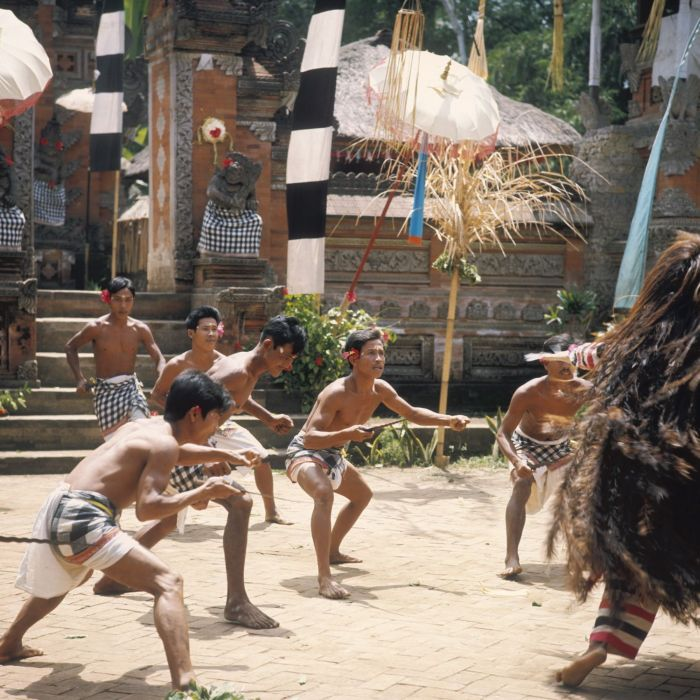
Barong dance performance with kris-wielding dancers and Rangda in Bali

In the Barong dance of Bali there is a segment called keris dance, in which the villain Rangda magically enchants Airlangga's soldiers to commit suicide, while another magician makes them invulnerable to sharp objects. In a trance state, the male dancers stab themselves in the chest with their own kris but remain unhurt.

The kris dance is a potentially dangerous dance and can lead to fatal accidents. In February 2021, a 16-year-old kris dancer was stabbed to death in his heart by his own kris, during a Rangda dance performance in Denpasar, Bali.

In Javanese culture the kris is revered as tosan aji (Javanese for "sacred heirloom weapon") and considered a pusaka. The kris is believed to have the ability to infuse bravery upon its holder: this property is known as piyandel in Javanese, which means "to add self-confidence". The pusaka kris or kris-tipped spear given by a Javanese king to nobles or his subjects was meant to symbolize the king's confidence bestowed upon the receiver and is considered a great honor. During the Javanese wedding ceremony, a kris is required to be adorned with chains of jasmine flower arrangement as an important part of the Javanese groom's wedding costume. The addition of the jasmine arrangement around the kris was meant as a symbol that a man should not easily be angry, cruel, fierce, too aggressive, tyrannical and abusive.

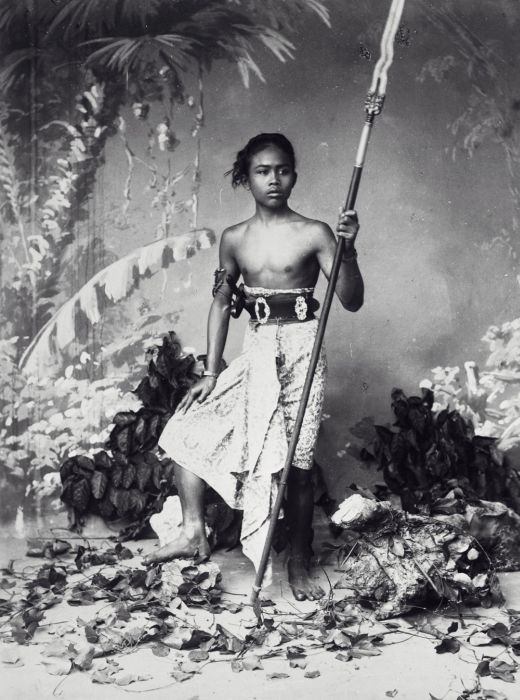
19th-century studio portrait of a native Javanese warrior with an iron kris-tipped spear

Kris-makers did more than forge the weapon, they carried out the old rituals which could infuse the blade with mystical powers. For this reason, kris are considered almost alive because they may be vessels of spirits, either good or evil. Legends tell of kris that could move of their own volition and killed individuals at will. Some kris are rumored to stand upright when their real names are called by their masters. It was said that some kris helped prevent fires, death, agricultural failure, and many other problems. Likewise, they could also bring fortune, such as bountiful harvests. Many of these beliefs were derived from the possession of different kris by different people. For example, there is a type of kris in Java that was called Beras Wutah, which was believed to grant its possessor an easy life without famine. This kris was mainly assigned to government officers who were paid, in whole or in part, with foodstuffs such as rice.

There are several ways of testing whether a kris is lucky or not. A series of cuts on a leaf, based on blade width and other factors, could determine if a blade was good or bad. Also, if the owner slept with the blade under their pillow, the spirit of the kris would communicate with the owner via dream. If the owner had a bad dream, the blade was unlucky and had to be discarded, whereas if the owner had a good dream, the dagger would bring good fortune. However, just because a blade was bad for one person didn't mean it would be bad for another. Harmony between the weapon and its owner was critical.

Because some kris are considered sacred and believed to possess magical powers, specific rites needed to be completed to avoid calling down evil fates, which is the reason warriors often made offerings to their kris at a shrine. There is also the belief that pointing a kris at someone means they will die soon, so silat practitioners precede their demonstrations by touching the points of the blades to the ground so as to neutralise this effect.

Kris in 19th-century Java

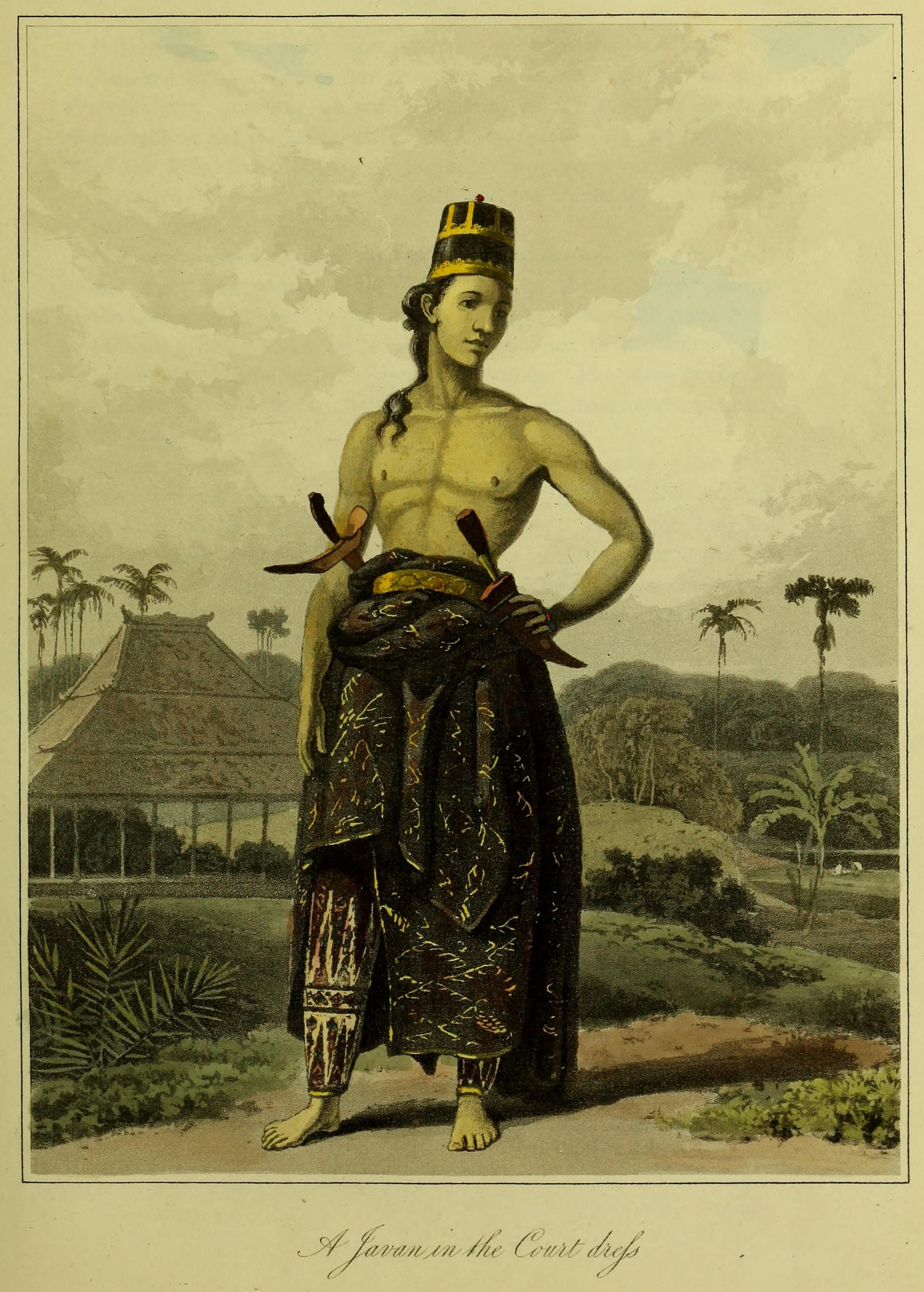
A Javanese man in court dress, The History of Java, by Thomas Stamford Raffles (1817)

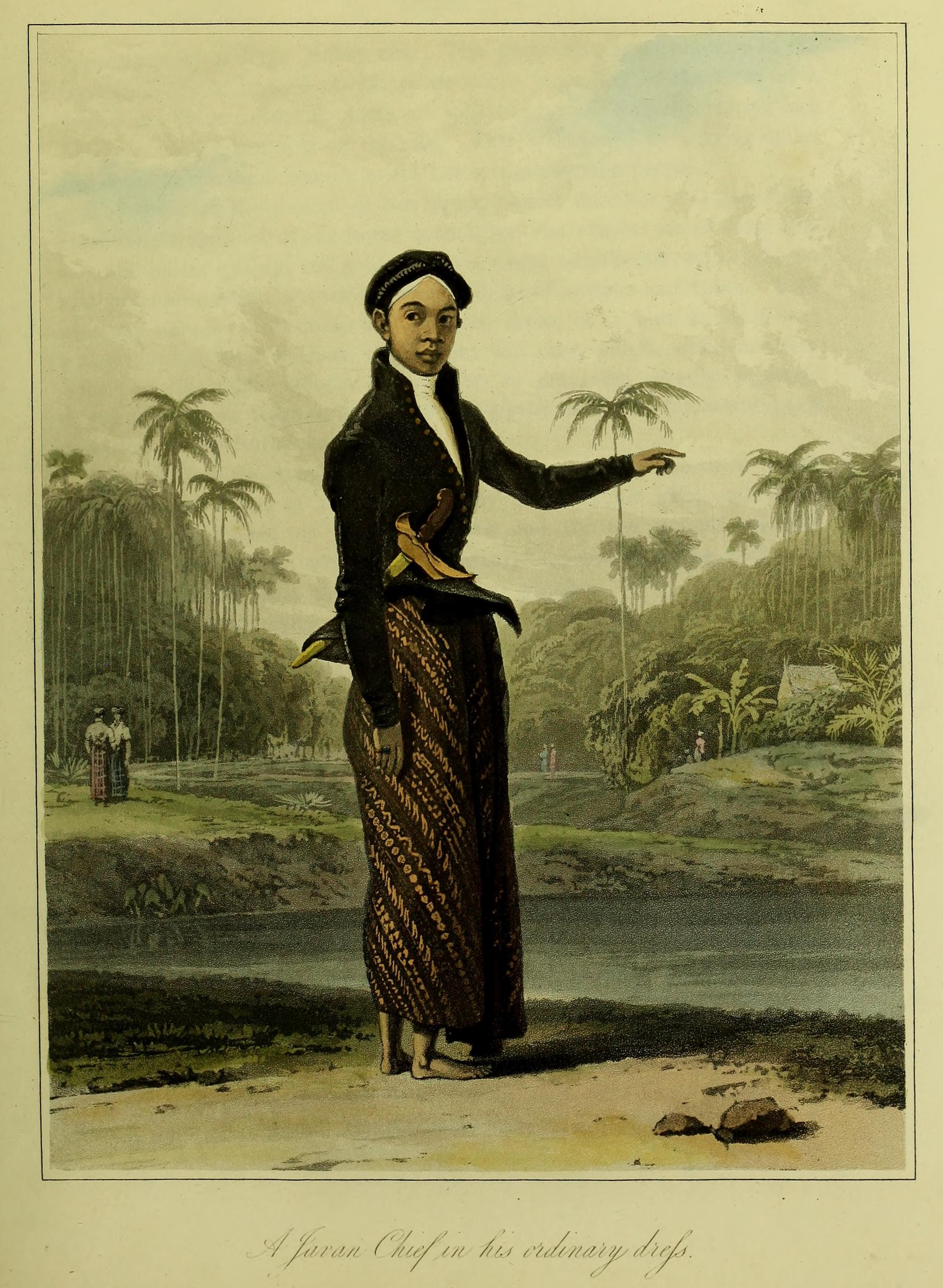
A Javanese chief, in his ordinary dress, The History of Java, by Thomas Stamford Raffles (1817)

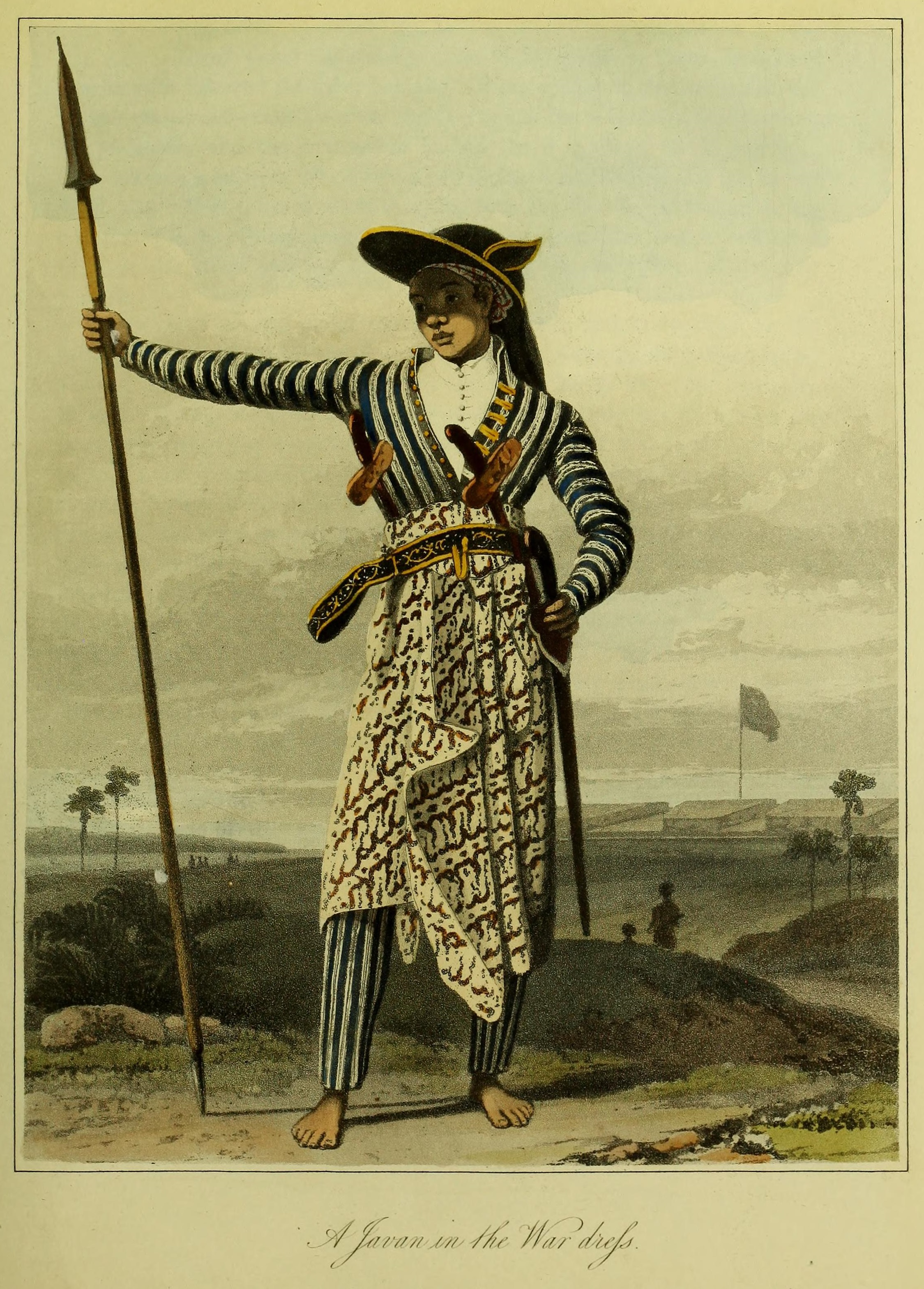
A Javanese man in war dress, The History of Java, by Thomas Stamford Raffles (1817)

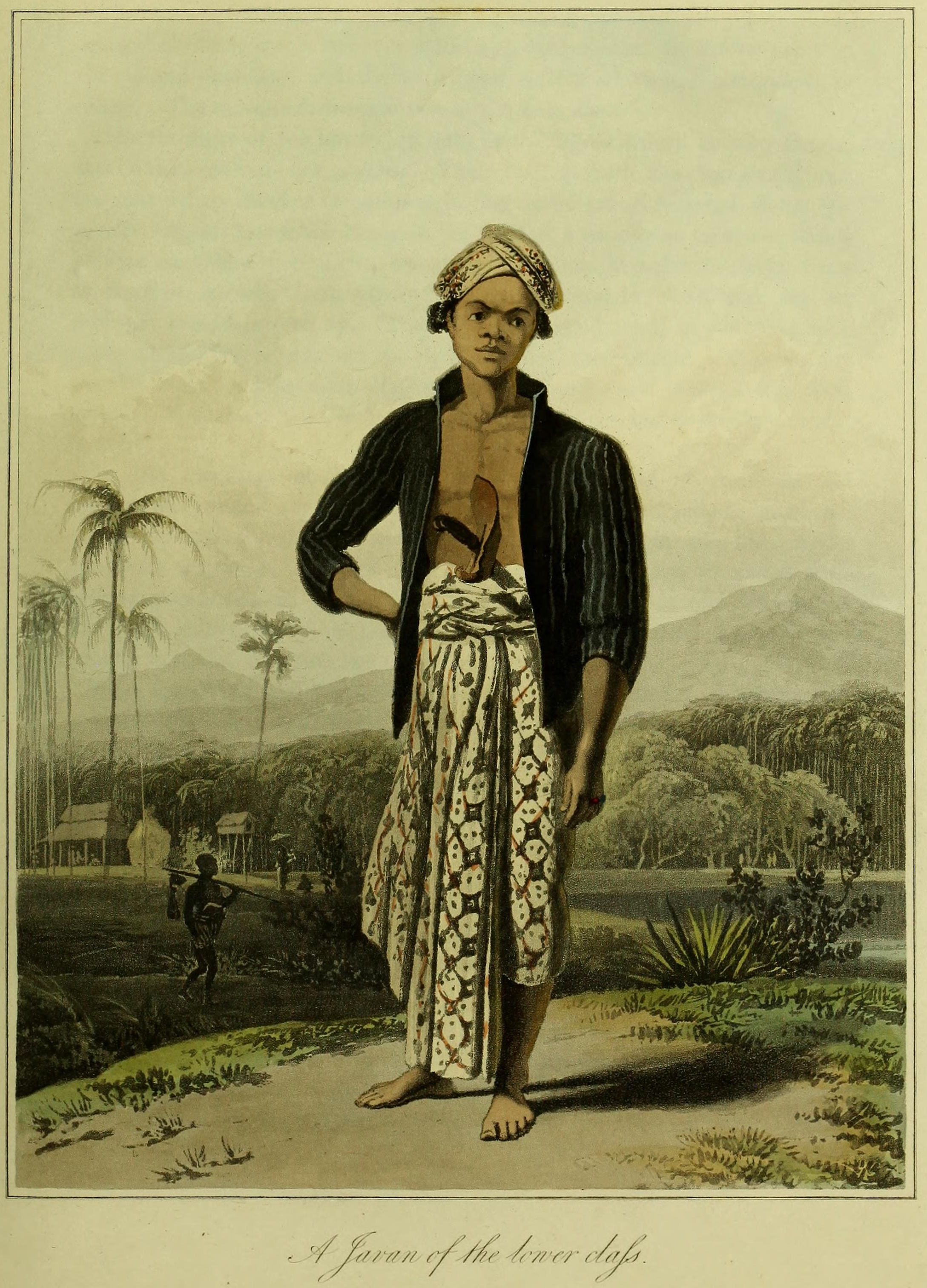
A Javanese man of the lower class, The History of Java, by Thomas Stamford Raffles (1817)

== Legendary and historic krises ==
Several narratives linked to historical figures mention kris that possess supernatural powers and extraordinary abilities. Most of the magical kris are of Javanese origin, while the narratives are mainly derived from Javanese ancient manuscripts and Babad (Javanese chronicle).

=== Kris Mpu Gandring ===
One of the most famous legends from Java comes from the Pararaton (Book of Kings). It describes a legendary bladesmith called Mpu Gandring or Empu Gandring and his impatient customer, Ken Arok, in the last days of the Kediri kingdom in the 13th century. The customer ordered a powerful kris to kill the mighty chieftain of Tumapel, Tunggul Ametung. Ken Arok eventually stabbed the old bladesmith to death because he kept delaying the scheduled completion of the kris. Dying, the bladesmith cursed the kris through prophecy that the unfinished or incomplete kris would kill seven men, including Ken Arok. Ken Arok used Mpu Gandring's cursed kris to assassinate Tunggul Ametung, cunningly put the blame on Kebo Ijo, and built a new kingdom of Singhasari. The prophecy finally came true, with four men enlisted as the kris' first death roll, including Mpu Gandring himself, Tunggul Ametung, Kebo Ijo to whom Ken Arok lent the weapon, and finally Ken Arok himself. The unfinished kris then disappeared.

Another version of the tale describes that the kris passed to Ken Arok's stepson Anusapati who in turn killed his stepfather after recognising that his biological father was killed by Ken Arok with the same kris. The bloody feud continued on and on until the reign of Kertanegara, the last king of Singosari Empire.

=== Kris Taming Sari ===
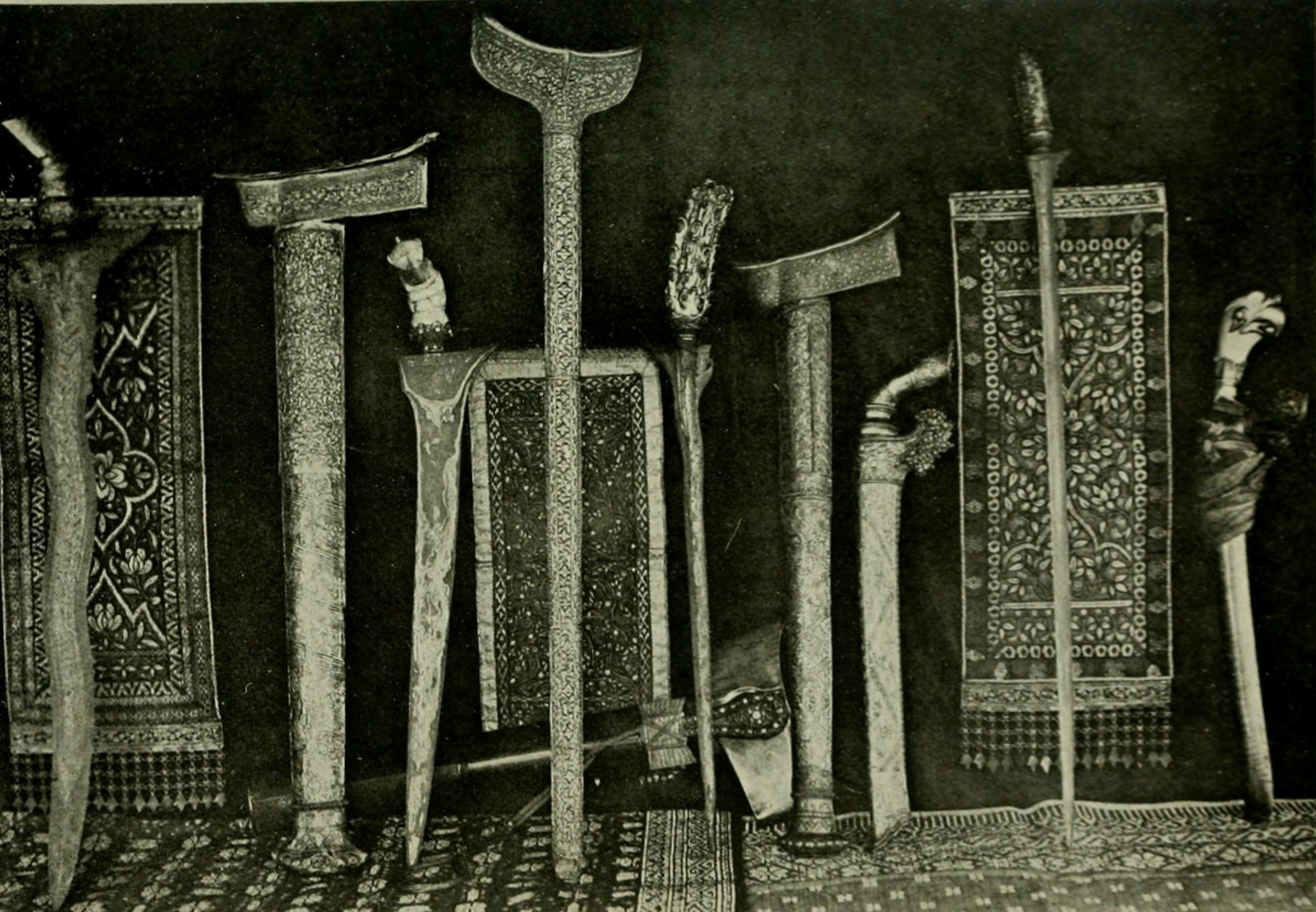
The Kris Taming Sari as seen third from the left, among the rest of the Perak royal regalia, 1907

Taming Sari ("flower shield") is one of the most well-known kris in Malay literature, said to be so skilfully crafted that anyone wielding it was unbeatable. In some versions of the legend, the weapon would grant its user physical invulnerability. The legend took place sometime during the fall of Majapahit Empire and the rise of the Malacca Sultanate in the 15th century. Tun Sri Lanang's book, the Sejarah Melayu, tells that it was made by a Javanese empu and first used by the champion of Majapahit, a pendekar named Taming Sari. He was defeated in a duel to the death by the Melakan admiral Hang Tuah, after which the king of Majapahit presented the weapon to the victor.

After being framed by a jealous official, Hang Tuah was ordered to be executed, but he managed to escape and go into hiding with the help of a minister who knew the truth. Hang Tuah's kris and title of Laksamana (admiral) were passed on to his comrade Hang Jebat. Furious that his best friend was unfairly put to death, Hang Jebat rebelled against the royalty and took over the palace. The desperate ruler of Melaka pardoned the minister so long as Hang Tuah could win him back the throne. Having trained under the same master since childhood, the two friends were nearly equals but of the two, Tuah was the superior fighter. However, even after a long battle in the palace, neither could best the other because the Kris Taming Sari evened the odds. Only after taking his weapon back did Hang Tuah manage to stab Jebat, who died soon after.

=== Kris Setan Kober ===
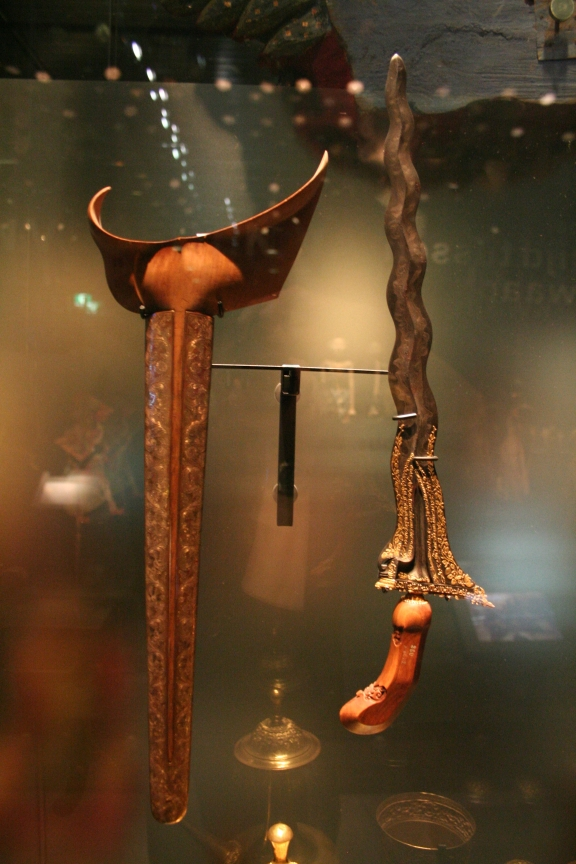
Javanese kris and scabbard displayed in Museum Volkenkunde, Leiden, the Netherlands

Javanese folk story tells of Arya Penangsang, the mighty viceroy (adipati) of Jipang who was killed by his own kris called Setan Kober ("devil of the grave"). It was forged by Empu Bayu Aji in the kingdom of Pajajaran, and had 13 luk on its blade. Near its completion, when the empu tried to infuse the weapon with spiritual power, he was disturbed by a crying demon (djinn) from the graveyard. As a result, although powerful, the kris had a temperamental, evil nature that caused the wielder to be overly ambitious and impatient.

The story took place in the 16th century, during the fall of Demak Sultanate that had replaced Majapahit as the ruler of Java. Setan Kober was safely kept by Sunan Kudus, one of the nine Islamic saints of Java. However, Sunan Prawoto, son of Prince Trenggana and grandson of Raden Patah, stole it and used it to assassinate his uncle Raden Kikin by the river. Since then, Raden Kikin is also referred to as Sekar Seda Lepen (flower that fell by the river). Raden Trenggana rose as a sultan and later, after his death, was replaced by Sunan Prawoto. Kikin's son, Penangsang of Jipang with the help of his teacher, Sunan Kudus, took revenge by sending an assassin to kill Prawoto using the Setan Kober kris. Prawoto's younger sister Ratu Kalinyamat sought revenge on Penangsang, since Penangsang also murdered her husband. She urged her brother in-law, Hadiwijaya (Joko Tingkir) the ruler of Pajang, to kill Arya Penangsang. Hadiwijaya sent his adopted son and also his son in-law Sutawijaya, who would later become the first ruler of the Mataram dynasty.

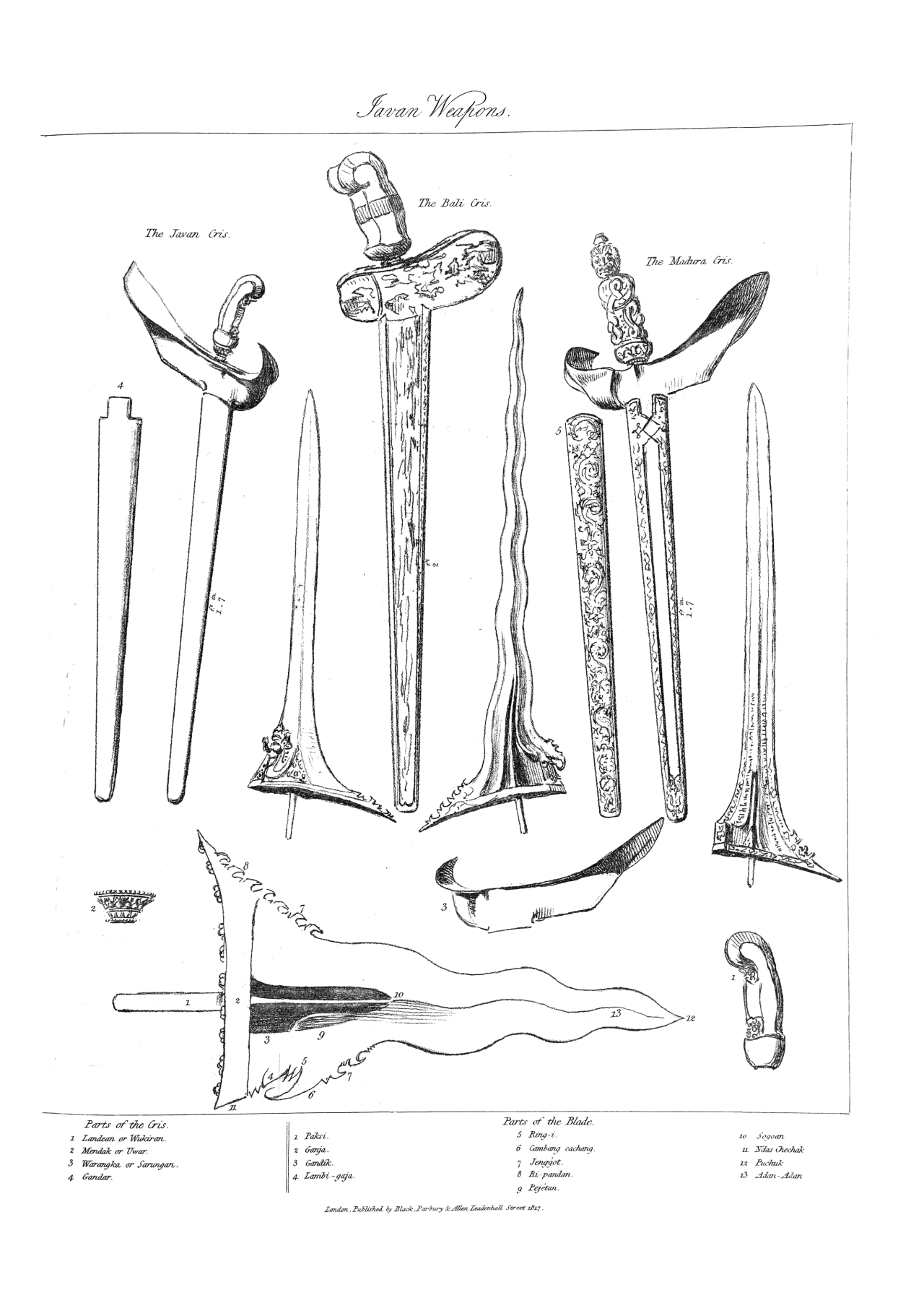
Weapon of Java: Keris, The History of Java by Thomas Stamford Raffles (1817)

During a battle, Sutawijaya stabbed Penangsang with the Kyai Plered spear in the gut. However, Penangsang was believed to possess aji or kesaktian (spiritual power), he kept fighting with an open wound in the stomach. He encircled his hanging intestines on his kris hilt and continued to fight. When trying to attack his opponent, the reckless, fierce and impatient Panangsang pulled his Setan Kober off its sheath but accidentally cut his own intestines and died.

The Javanese tradition of putting jasmine garlands around the kris hilt, especially on the groom's kris during the wedding ceremony, is said to originate from this tale. It is to symbolize that the groom should not be reckless, easily get angry, impatient and abusive like Arya Panangsang. To replace the intestine, the kris is coiled with a floral garland of jasmine chain that resembles intestine. The jasmine is to symbolize sacredness, patience, grace, humility, kindness and benevolence, the qualities lack in Panangsang. However another source mentioned that actually Sutawijaya admired Penangsang's fighting spirits, still fighting although his intestine encircled around his kris. Impressed by Penangsang's deed, later he command his male descendants to follow his step, adorned the kris with "intestine" made from the chain of jasmine, as a symbol of bravery. The story of Arya Penangsang has inspired and performed as Javanese ketoprak drama.

=== Kris Diponegoro ===
During the Royal Netherlands state visit to Indonesia in March 2020, King Willem-Alexander returned the kris of Prince Diponegoro to Indonesia, received by President Joko Widodo. Today considered as Indonesian national hero, Prince Diponegoro of Yogyakarta was the charismatic leader of the mass rebellion against Dutch colonial rule in Central Java, that was defeated and taken prisoner after the conclusion of Java War in 1830. His kris was long considered lost, but has now been found, after being identified by the Dutch National Museum of Ethnology in Leiden. The kris of Prince Diponegoro represents a historic importance, as a symbol of Indonesian heroic resilience and the nation's struggle for independence. The extraordinary gold-inlaid Javanese dagger previously was held as the Dutch state collection, and is now part of the collection of the Indonesian National Museum.

== Symbolism ==
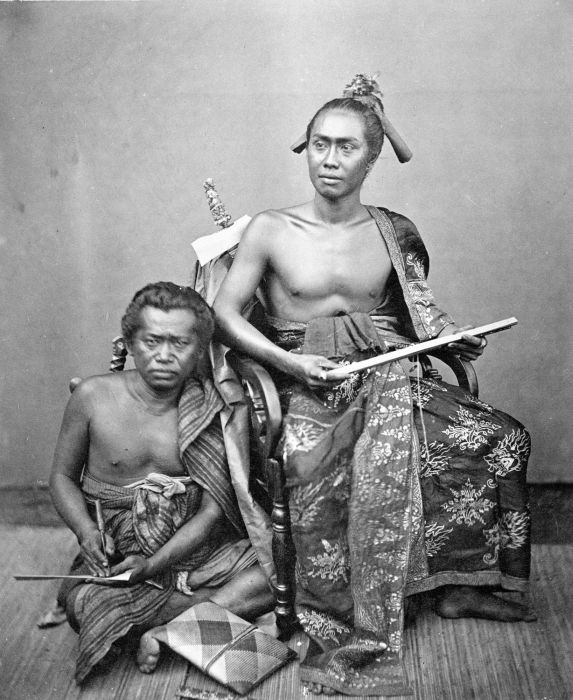
Gusti Ngurah Ketut Djelantik, Lord of Buleleng, Bali (c. 1870), wore kris as a symbol of power and authority.

Throughout the archipelago, the kris is a symbol of heroism, martial prowess, power and authority. As a cultural symbol, the meticulously decorated kris represents refinement, art, and beauty, as the pride and prized possession for its owner; however, as a weapon it is associated with violence, death and bloodshed. Probably for this reason, although the kris is widespread in Javanese culture, it is not used to symbolise Javanese culture or royalty, as Javanese tradition promotes harmony and discourages direct confrontation (hence the absence of knives on Indonesian dinner tables). This is also why the Javanese traditionally wear the kris on their back, to symbolize violence as the last resort. Balinese and Sundanese also wear the kris on their back. However, in other parts of the archipelago, from Sumatra to the Malay Peninsula and to Sulawesi, the kris is worn on the front or left side on the hip.

The kris is depicted on different flags, emblems, coats, and logos such as those of the Aceh Sultanate Mataram Sultanate, Riau Islands Province, Terengganu and Selangor. The former emblem of Siam used the kris to represent the southern territories. It can also be seen on an obverse copper-zinc-tin RM1 coin with a songket pattern in the background. The Malaya and British Borneo dollar 1 cent coin of 1962 also depicted a pair of crossed kris.

In the British colonies of future Federation of Malaya, the kris has become a symbol of early Malay nationalism (see Malaya's proposed flag designs); especially of the ethno-majoritarian right-wing ketuanan Melayu strain decades on post-independence; it is incorporated into the Sang Saka Bangsa, party flag of United Malays National Organisation, once dominant in Malaysian politics.

In the Philippines, the kalis, a larger sword variant of the kris, is a symbol of Moro and southern Filipino culture, and a resistance to Spanish rule and influence. It is incorporated into the flags of the Moro National Liberation Front and the Moro Islamic Liberation Front. It has also been incorporated into the flag of Bangsamoro Autonomous Region in Muslim Mindanao, historical flags of the Sultanate of Sulu, as well as the emblem of the Cotabato Province.

== Gallery ==
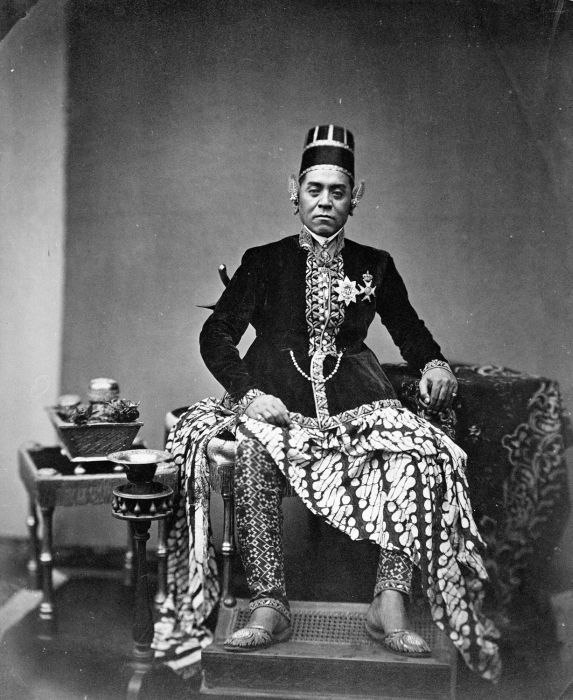
Sultan Hamengkubuwono VI, King of Yogyakarta Sultanate (1855–1877), dressed in royal majesty attire including his kris.

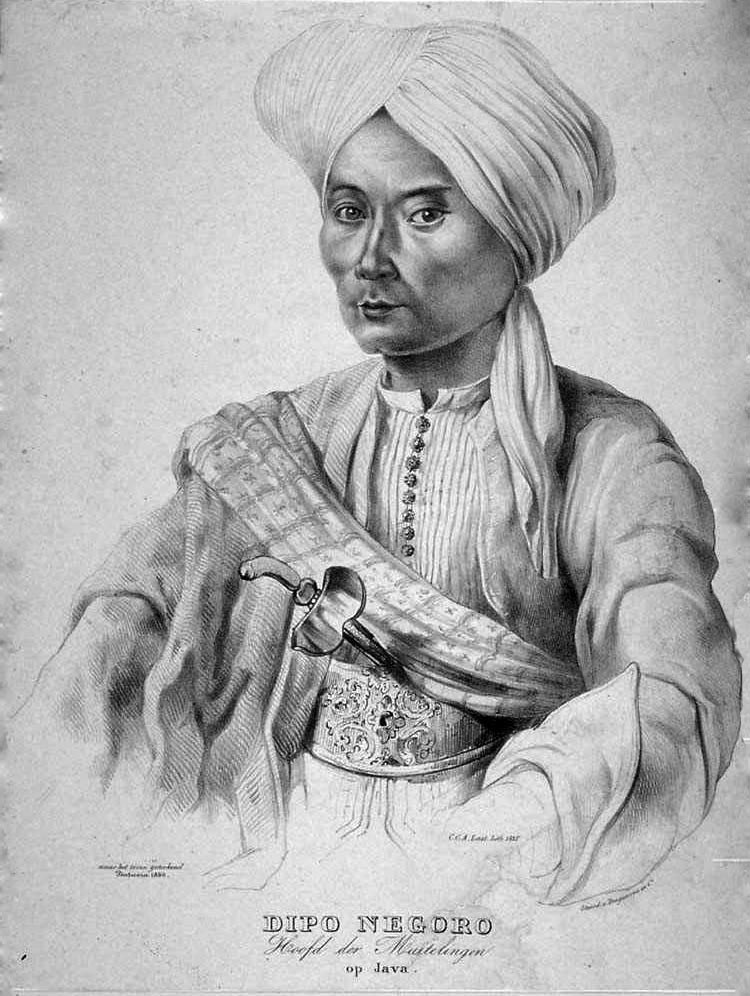
Portrait of Prince Diponegoro with kris, one of Indonesia's national heroes from Java, c. 1835

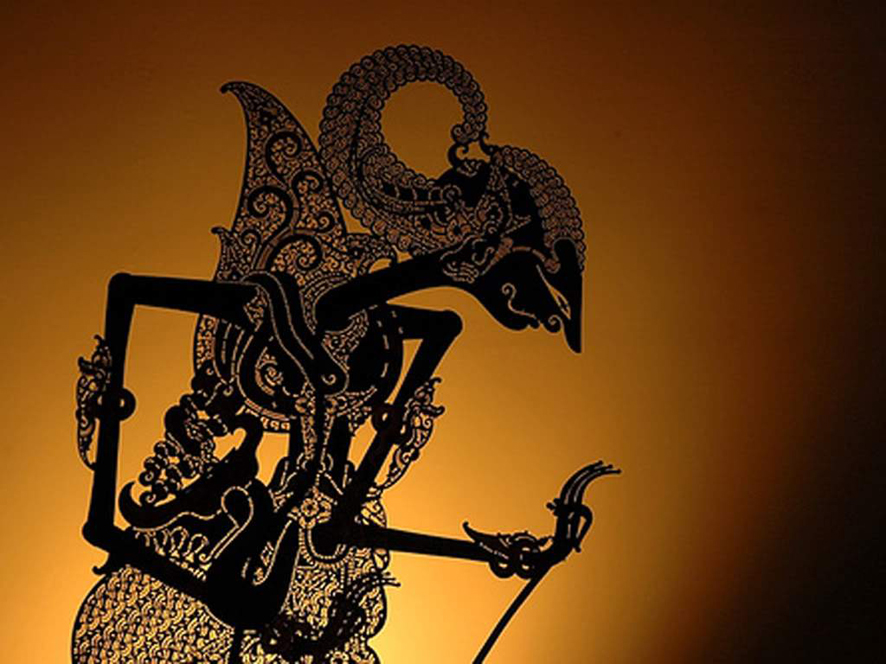
Wayang kulit depicting Prabu Pandu Dewanata with his kris

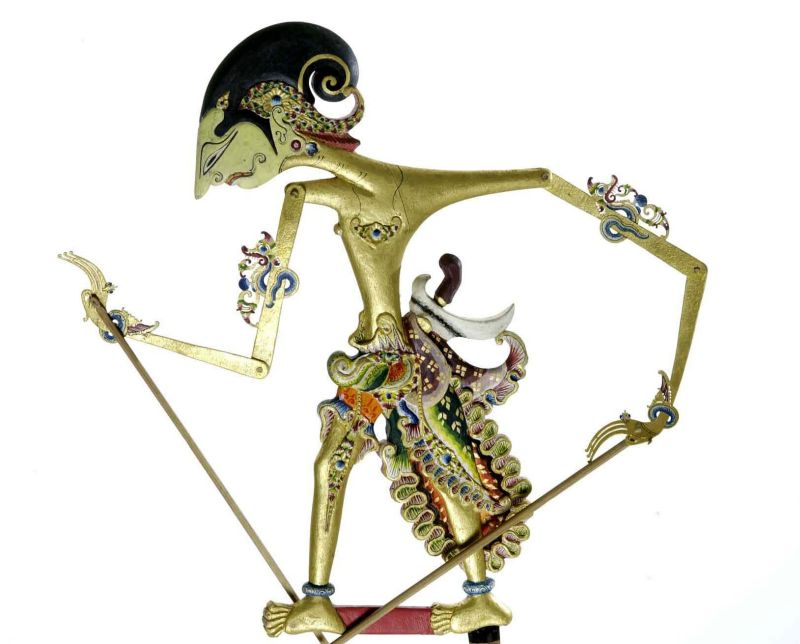
Wayang Klithik (Flat Wooden Puppet) figure of Damar Wulan with his kris, Tropenmuseum Collections, before 1933

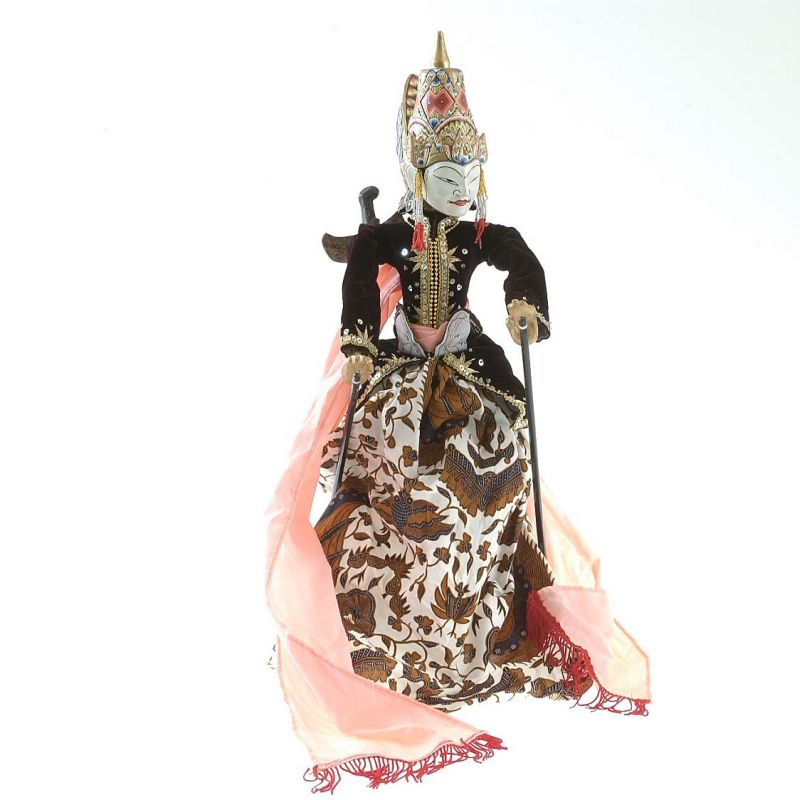
Wayang Golek Menak in Java, Jayengrana with his kris, a collection of Tropenmuseum, Netherland. before 2003
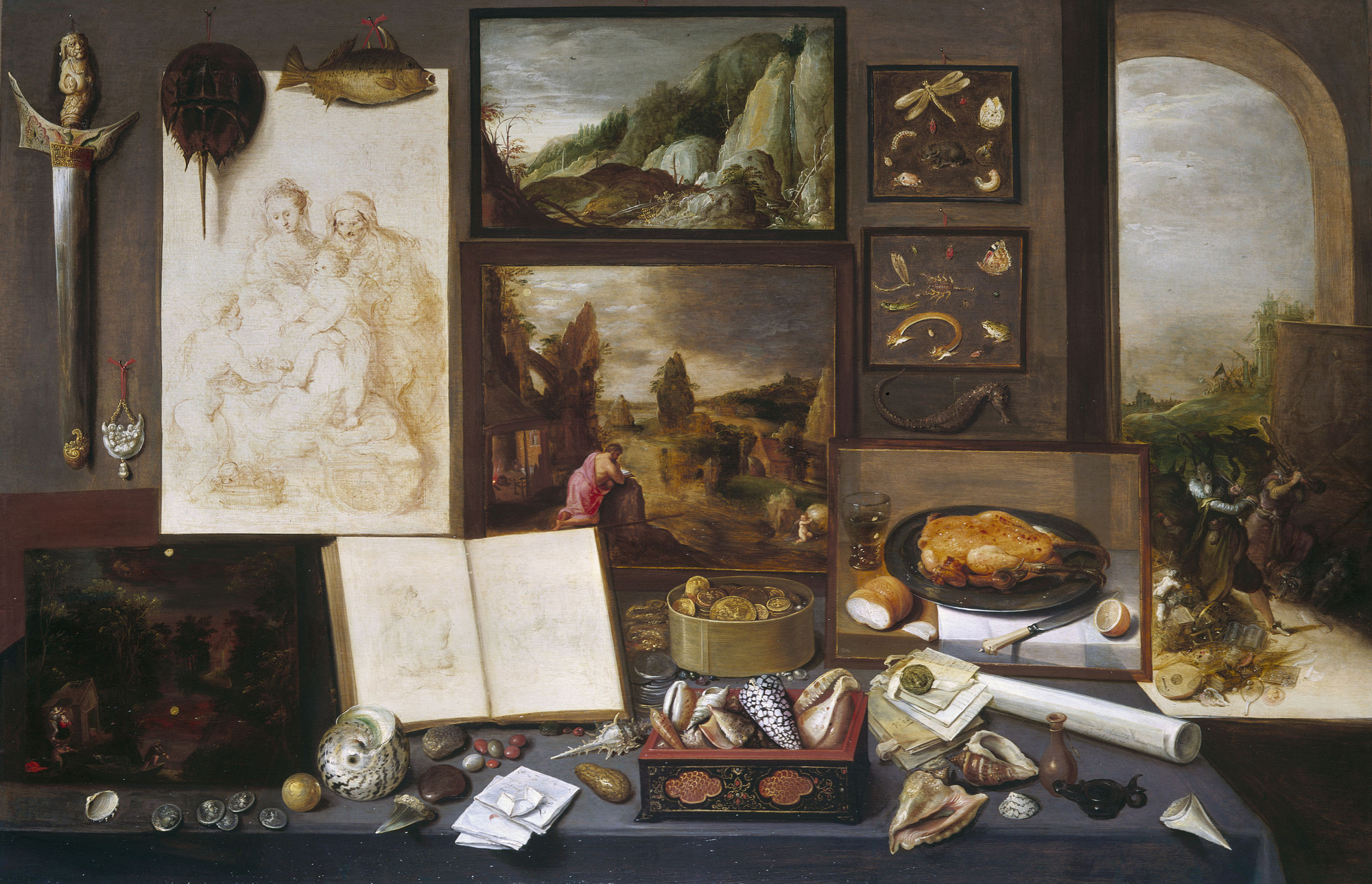
Painting by Frans Francken the Younger. Even as early as the 17th century, awareness of the kris has reached far into Europe. Kris seen at top left.

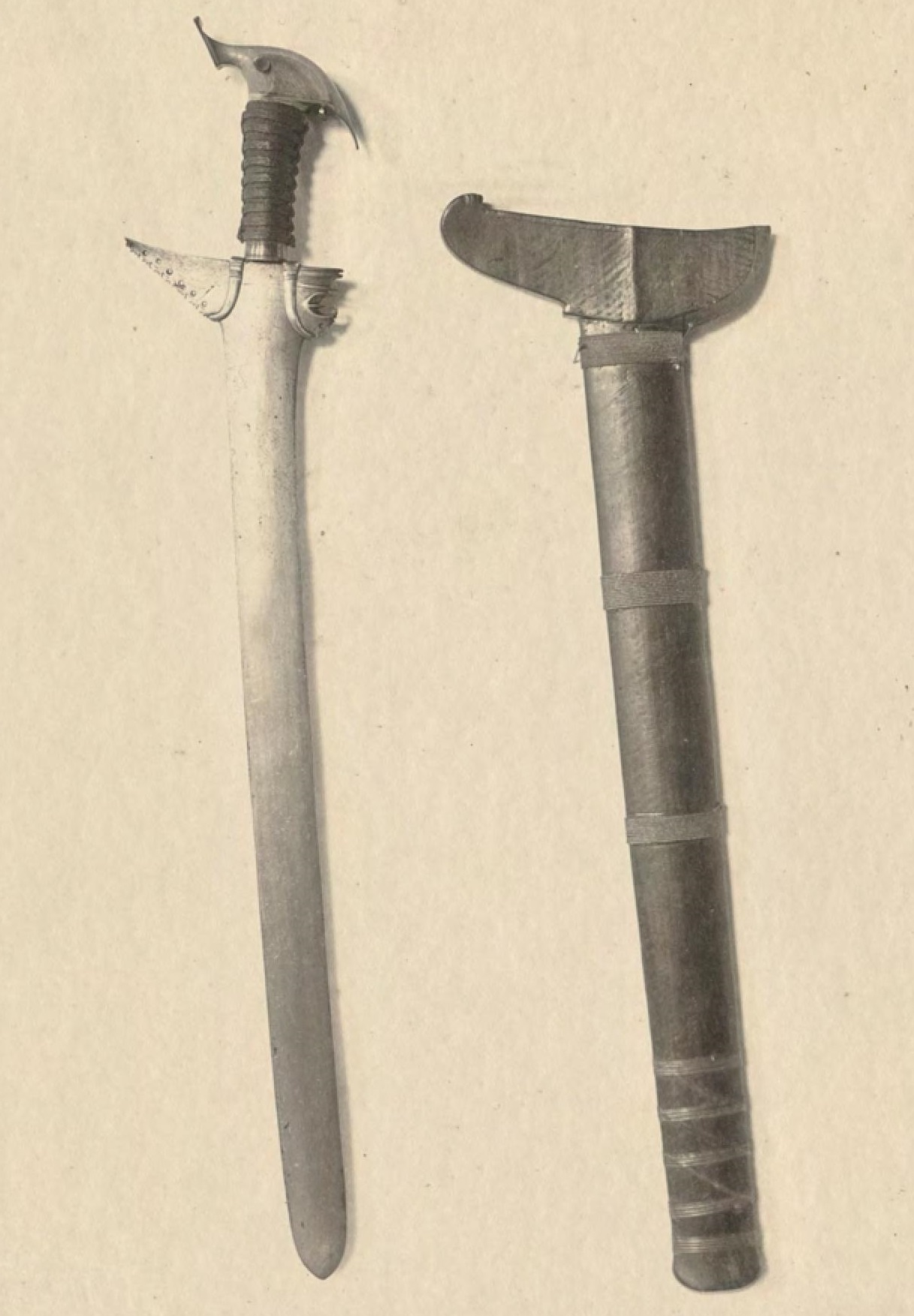
A Javanese sundang sword with straight blade

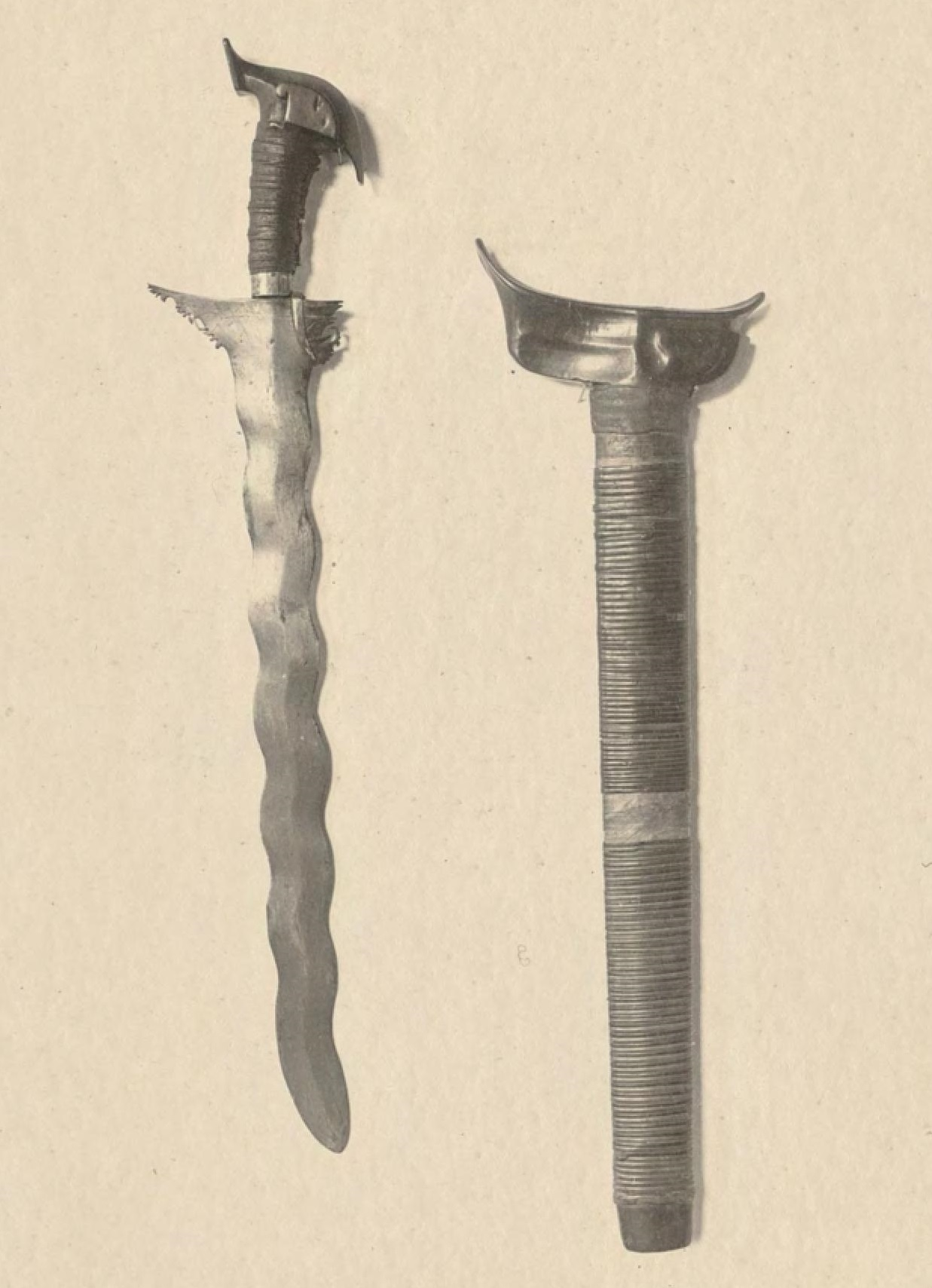
A Javanese sundang sword with wavy blade

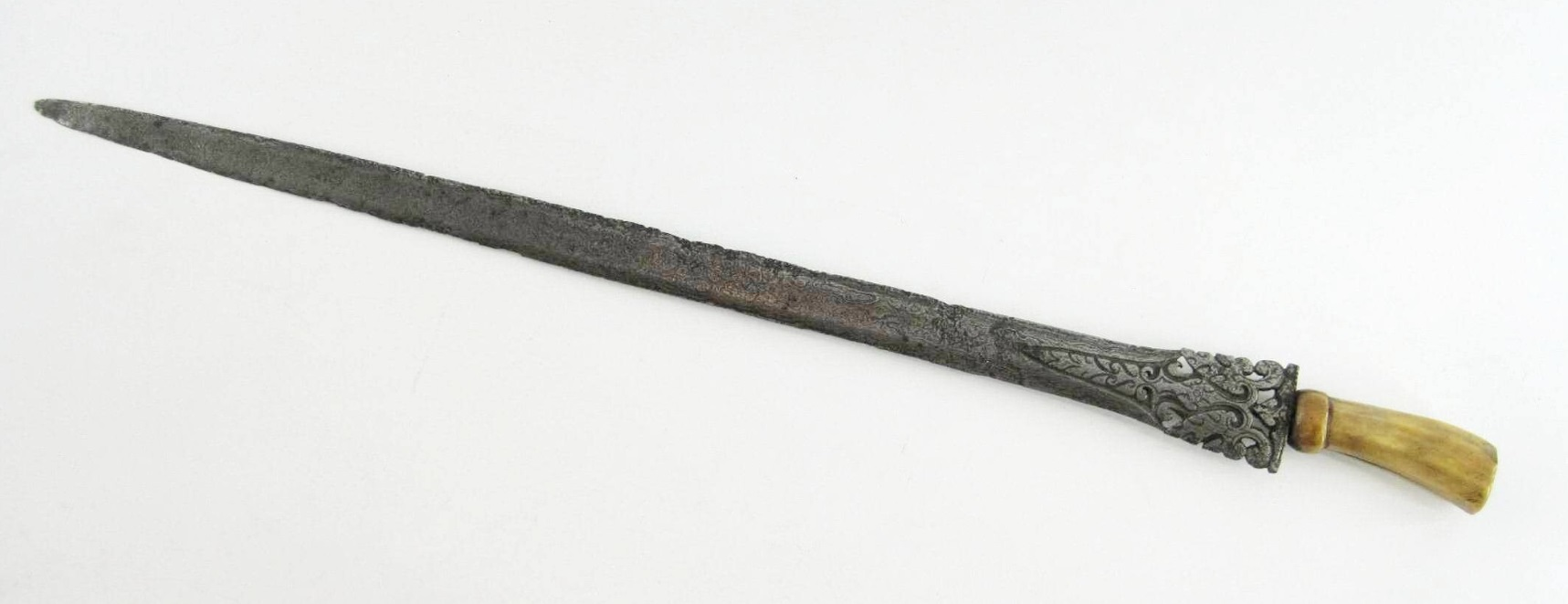
A Javanese sword similar to a kris
Kris are depicted in several emblems as a symbol

Flag of Mataram Sultanate

Kris in UMNO flag

Emblem of Riau

Emblem of Riau Islands

Emblem of West Kalimantan

Emblem of Jambi

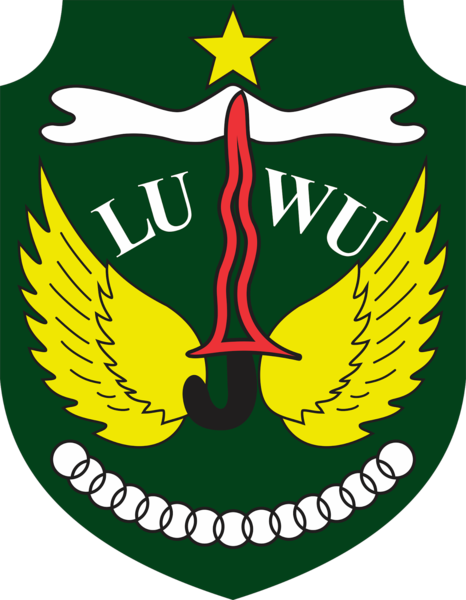
Emblem of Luwu Regency

Old emblem of Siam

Emblem of Selangor

Emblem of Terengganu

Flag of the Moro National Liberation Front (MNLF)

Flag of Kelantan

== In popular culture ==
- A kris is featured in the short story "The Crab Who Played with the Sea" from Rudyard Kipling's 1902 Just So Stories.
- In Power Rangers Wild Force, Org Duke Jindrax uses kris knives.
- In the flash games, Exmortis 2 and Exmortis 3, a kris blade is used by Mr. Hannay, both as a weapon and as a key.
- In 2019, a kris was featured in season 6, episode 7 of the History Channel competition show Forged in Fire as the final weapon the contestants were tasked with creating.
- In the Mortal Kombat franchise, the character Ashrah wields a kris.
- Anya Melfissa from Hololive's Indonesian branch is based on a kris who has taken human form.
- A kris with mystical powers is a central feature in the Dutch TV thriller series De Kris Pusaka broadcast in 1977.
- In the manga Demon Slayer: Kimetsu no Yaiba, the character Obanai Iguro wields a kris-like katana.

== See also ==
- Flame-bladed sword
- Kalis, sword version of kris from the Philippines
- Keris bahari, rapier version of keris
- Kris of Knaud, oldest surviving kris
- KRISS Vector, US submachine gun named after the blade
- Kujang, dagger from West Java
