= Keris bahari =

Type of dagger from Sumatra

Keris Bahari
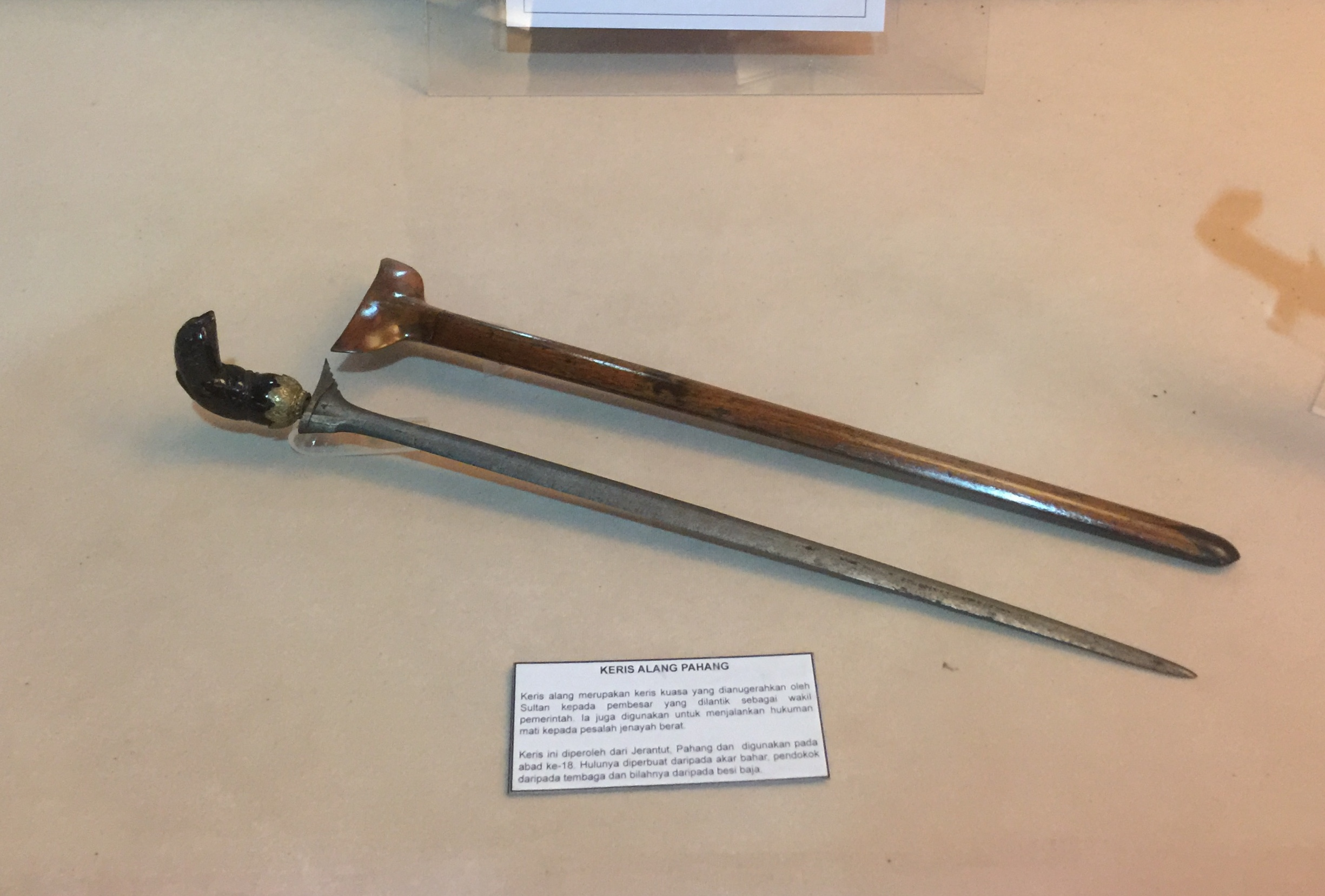
- Keris bahari of keris alang type
- Type: Kris
- Place of origin: Indonesia (Sumatra)

Service history
- Used by: Malays (ethnic group)

Specifications
- Length: overall length: approx. 58–66 cm (23–26 in)
- Blade type: Straight double edged
- Hilt type: Wood, ivory
- Scabbard/sheath: Wood

A Keris Bahari (or "Bahari kris") is a long version of a kris dagger mainly used in Sumatra. It is also called Keris panjang (meaning, "Long kris"). Keris bahari is dubbed by European people as "Sumatran rapier kris" or "execution kris".

== History ==
Keris bahari evolved from the original kris, which is a dagger. As men fought, they needed a weapon with greater reach, and kris became longer and heavier. Two forms then evolved: The first is rapier kris (keris bahari), and the second is broadsword kris (sundang). Because the blade became longer, the handle had to be straightened to balance it.

== Description ==
The hilt of keris bahari is made of horn, sometimes of silver and fish ivory, usually beautifully carved. The shape of the hilt is straight or slightly curving at the end. The sheath tip is usually rounded, but if cased in silver it often has square tip. The blade of keris bahari is long and narrow. Keris bahari is classified to 3 type depending on the length: The longest is called keris panjang, the medium keris alang, and the shortest, keris pendek.

== Execution by kris ==
The execution by kris is called hukuman salang. Salang is synonymous with keris panjang. The executioner made the victim squat, then drove the keris panjang from certain spot inside his collar bone down to the heart.

== See also ==
- Kalis
- Langgai Tinggang
- Luwuk (sword)
