= Kris of Knaud =

Oldest known surviving kris

Keris of Knaud
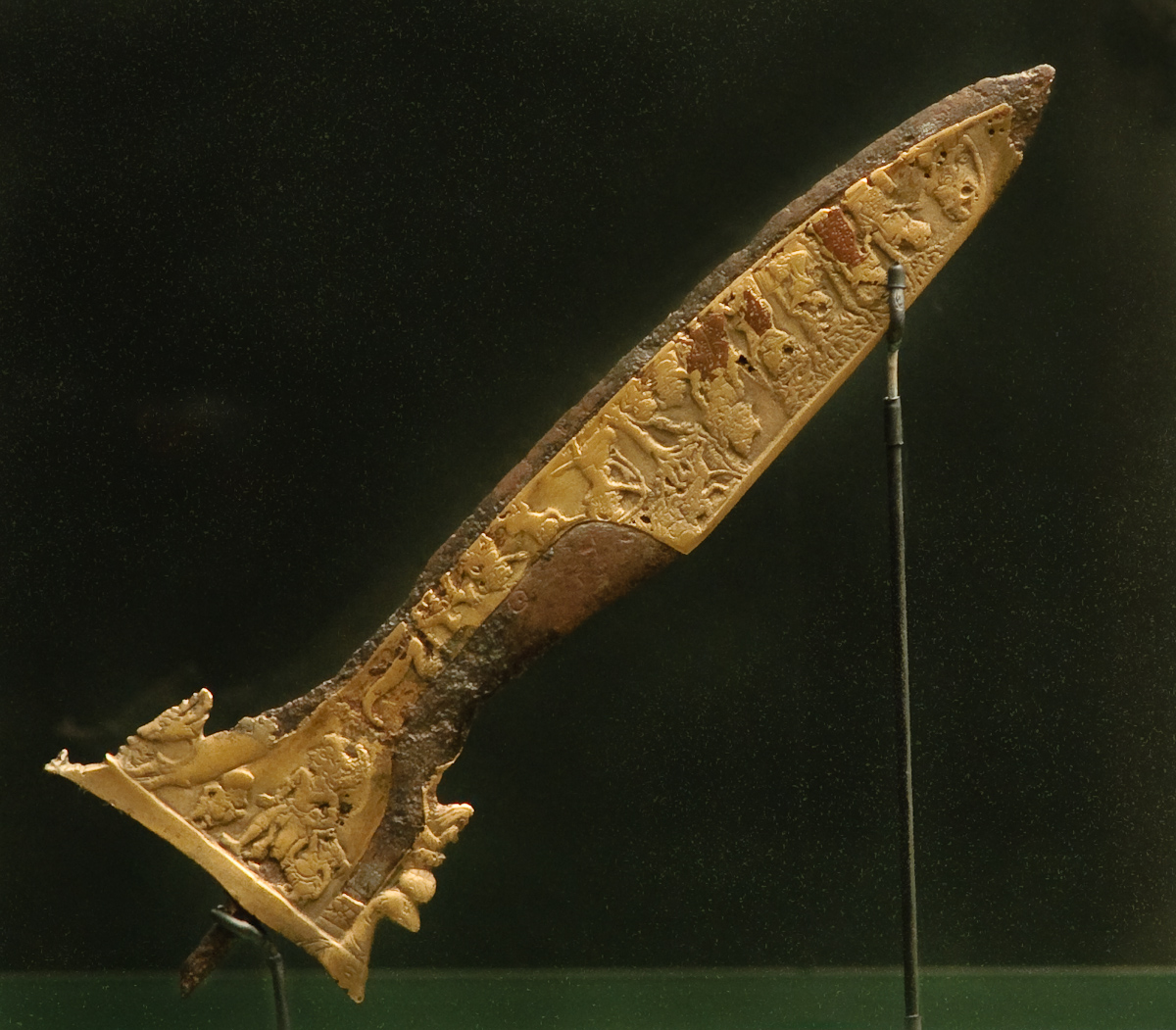
- The Keris of Knaud exhibited at the Amsterdam Museum of the Tropics.
- Material: iron and copper
- Created: circa 14th century
- Present location: Tropenmuseum, Amsterdam

The Kris of Knaud, also known as the Keris of Knaud or Knaud's Kris, is the oldest known kris surviving in the world. Given to Charles Knaud, a Dutch physician, by Paku Alam V in the 19th century, the kris is on display at the Tropenmuseum, Royal Tropical Institute in Amsterdam.

== History ==
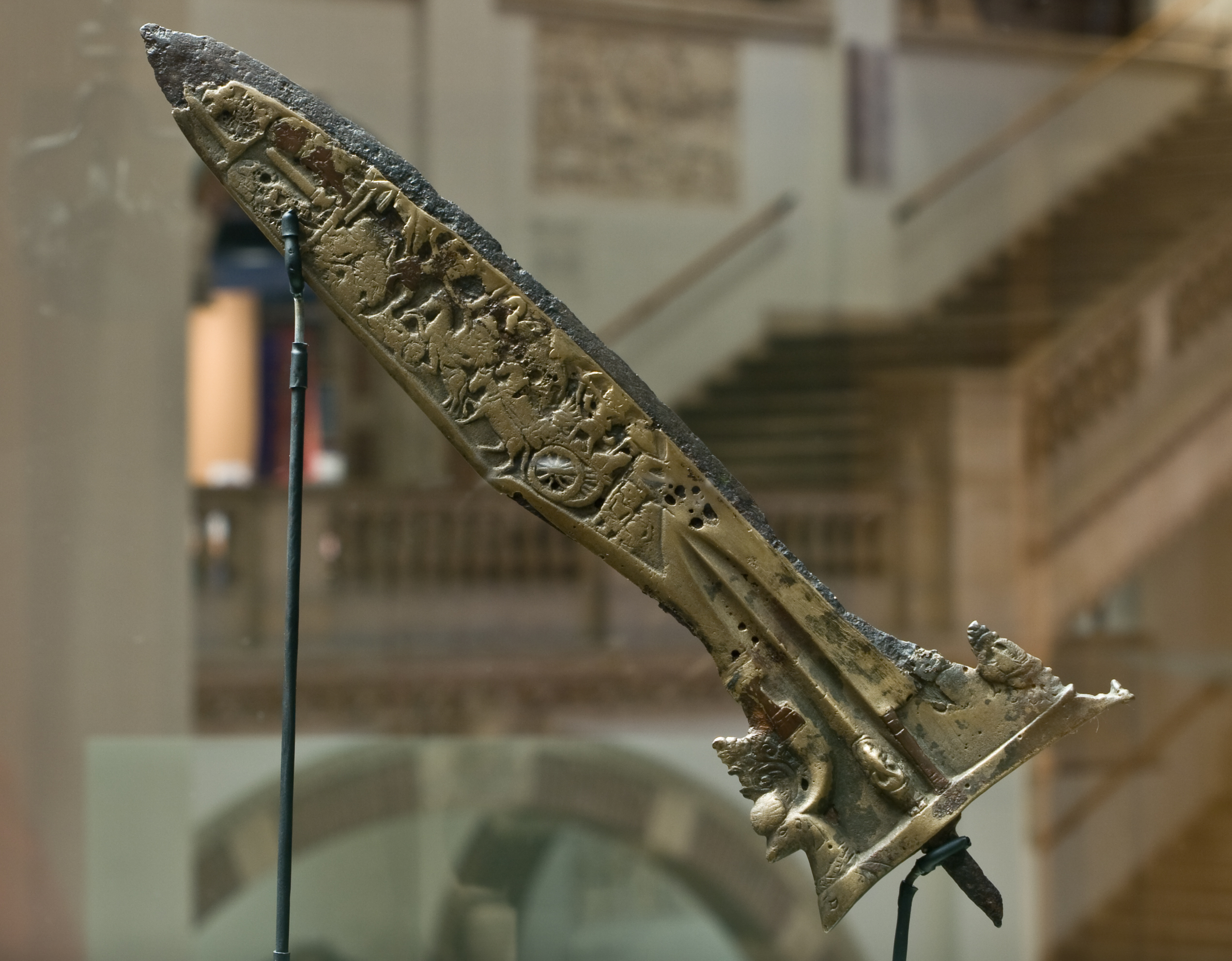
Another side of Kris of Knaud

The kris bears the date of 1264 (which corresponds to 1342 AD) in its iron blade. Scientists suspect that due to its special features the kris is even older, but was decorated during the heyday of the Majapahit kingdom to celebrate an important event. The kris bears scenes from the Ramayana on an unusual thin copper layer which partially covers it.

Charles Knaud (Batavia 1840 - Amsterdam 1897) was a Dutch physician and dukun (shaman) at the court of Yogyakarta. Knaud, who had studied Javanese mysticism, treated and cured the son of Paku Alam V (1878-1900), ruler of the hereditary Pakualaman principality in the Sultanate of Yogyakarta, of what the ruler believed to be black magic (guna-guna). For saving his son's life Paku Alam V granted him a prestigious heirloom, a kris. It was the oldest kris in the prince's collection.

From 1903, the kris was believed to be lost, but it remained in the possession of Knaud's family. Long after Knaud's death, during World War II, his family buried the Keris in their garden to protect it during the Japanese occupation. During the Indonesian National Revolution, they took it to the Netherlands, where it was safeguarded in the family's bank safe.

In the 19th century, a plaster cast and a photograph of the kris were kept in the holdings of the Bataviaasch Museum of Arts and Archaeology. In 1920, N.J. Krom dedicated a full page to the keris in Hindoe-Javaansche Kunst. David van Duuren a curator with the Royal Tropical Institute happened to ask Knaud's descendant, Kurht Knaud, if he was aware of the rare kris that had once been in his family's possession and was surprised to discover it still was. Kurht Knaud loaned the keris to the Royal Tropical Institute, K.I.T., Amsterdam, where it has been displayed since February 2003.
