= Pusaka =

Pusaka is a Sanskrit-based word meaning treasure or heirloom.

Within Javanese Kejawen culture and other Austronesian cultures affected by it, known as the Malays, but most specifically the inhabitants of modern-day Indonesia and Malaysia (Minangs), Balinese, Bataks, Bugis, Manado, Minang, Moro, Pampangan, Tagalog and many others, pusaka specifically refers to family heirlooms inherited from ancestors, which must be treasured and protected. These pusaka may have individual names, honorific titles and supernatural attributes and qualities. The possessor of the pusaka may be positively or negatively affected by the pusaka, depending on the will or spirit of the item.

The Javanese warrior-king Pangeran Sambernyawa's keris was a pusaka so powerful that merely pointing at the distant Chinese, Dutch or other enemies, would snatch their souls and leave them dead on the battlefield. Allegedly, former Indonesian President Suharto held possession of this powerful pusaka and had Indonesia scoured for the many pusaka lost to time, including, according to rumours, the mask of Gadjah Mada, several tombak (pikes and lances) and many keris, to affirm his legitimacy as a modern pseudo-king.
