= Krama Inggil =

Form of Javanese

Krama Inggil is a polite form of the Javanese language used in daily conversations, especially with older people. The opposite of this speaking manner is called "Boso Ngoko". Nowadays, this manner of speaking is rarely used by the residents of Java, often because it is viewed as an outdated or old fashioned manner of speaking. An example of this language is the word meaning head sirrah, "sampean" meaning you, and much more.

== Example and comparison ==
- Ngoko: Aku arep mangan. ("I want to eat.")
- Madyå: Kula ajeng nedha.
- Krama:
  - (Neutral) Kula badhé nadhi.
  - (Humble) Dalem badhé nedhi.
