= Sumenep (town) =

Kota Sumenep: Kota Soemanap; Kota Soemenap
- Town (District) and Regency seat
- Kota Sumenep District; Kecamatan Kota Sumenep

Madurese transcription(s)
  - Latèn script: Kottha Songennep
  - Pèghun script: كَوڟّا سَوڠۤنّۤڤ
  - Carakan script: ꦏꦺꦴꦛ꧀ꦛꦯꦺꦴꦔꦼꦤ꧀ꦤꦼꦥ꧀

Javanese transcription(s)
  - Gedrig script: Kutha Sungenep
  - Pégon script: كوڟا سوڠۤنۤڤ
  - Hanacaraka script: ꦏꦸꦛꦯꦸꦔꦼꦤꦼꦥ꧀
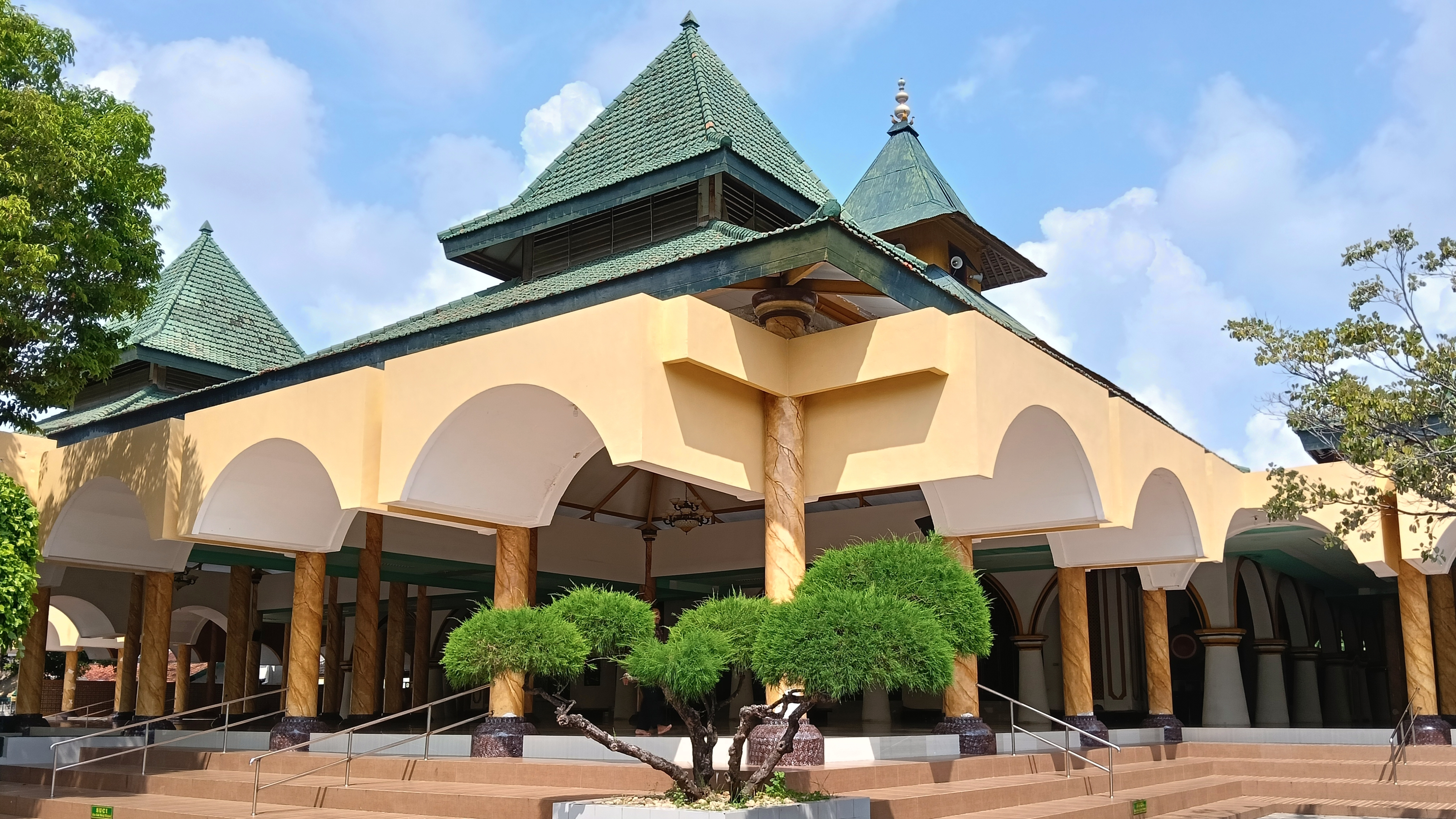
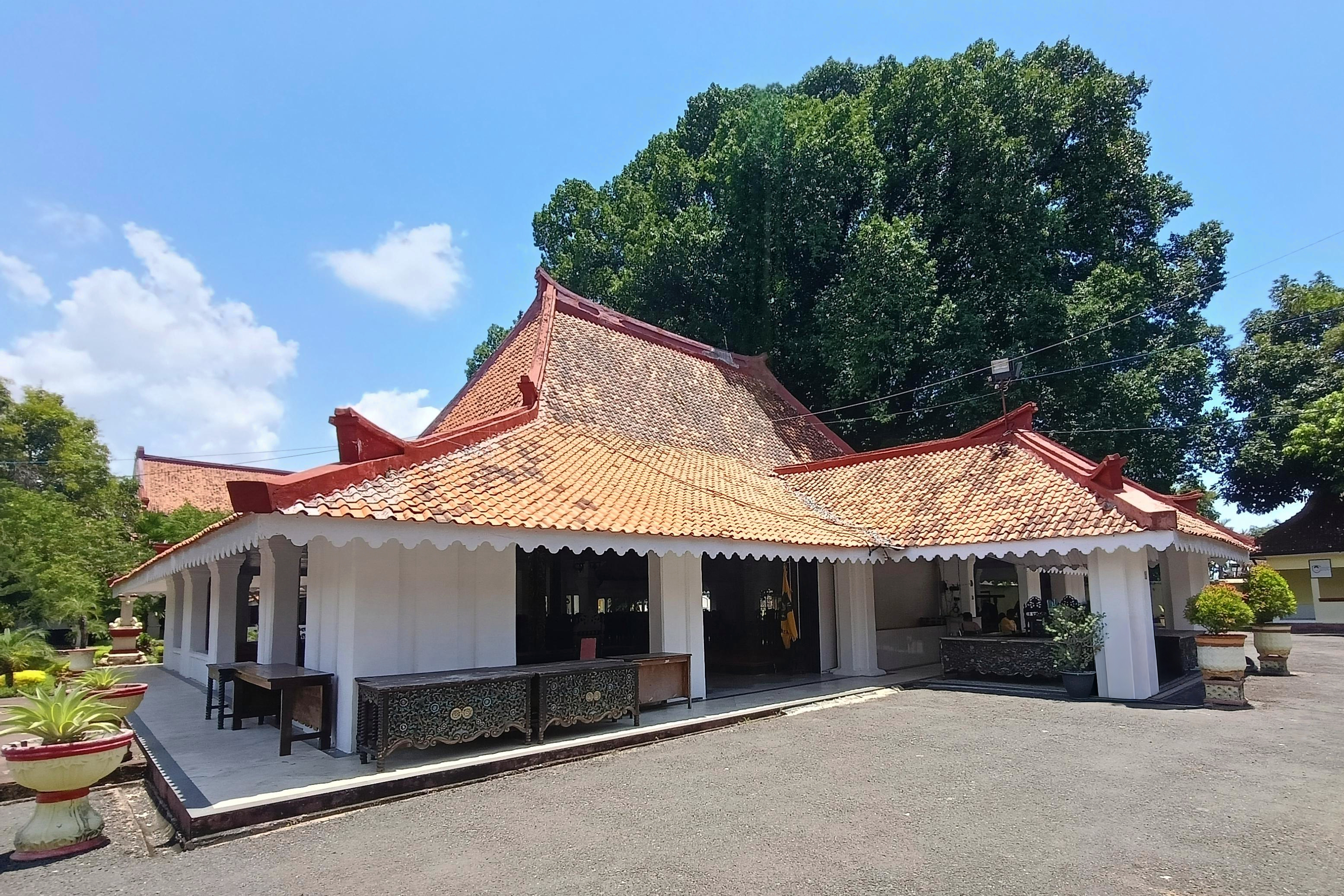
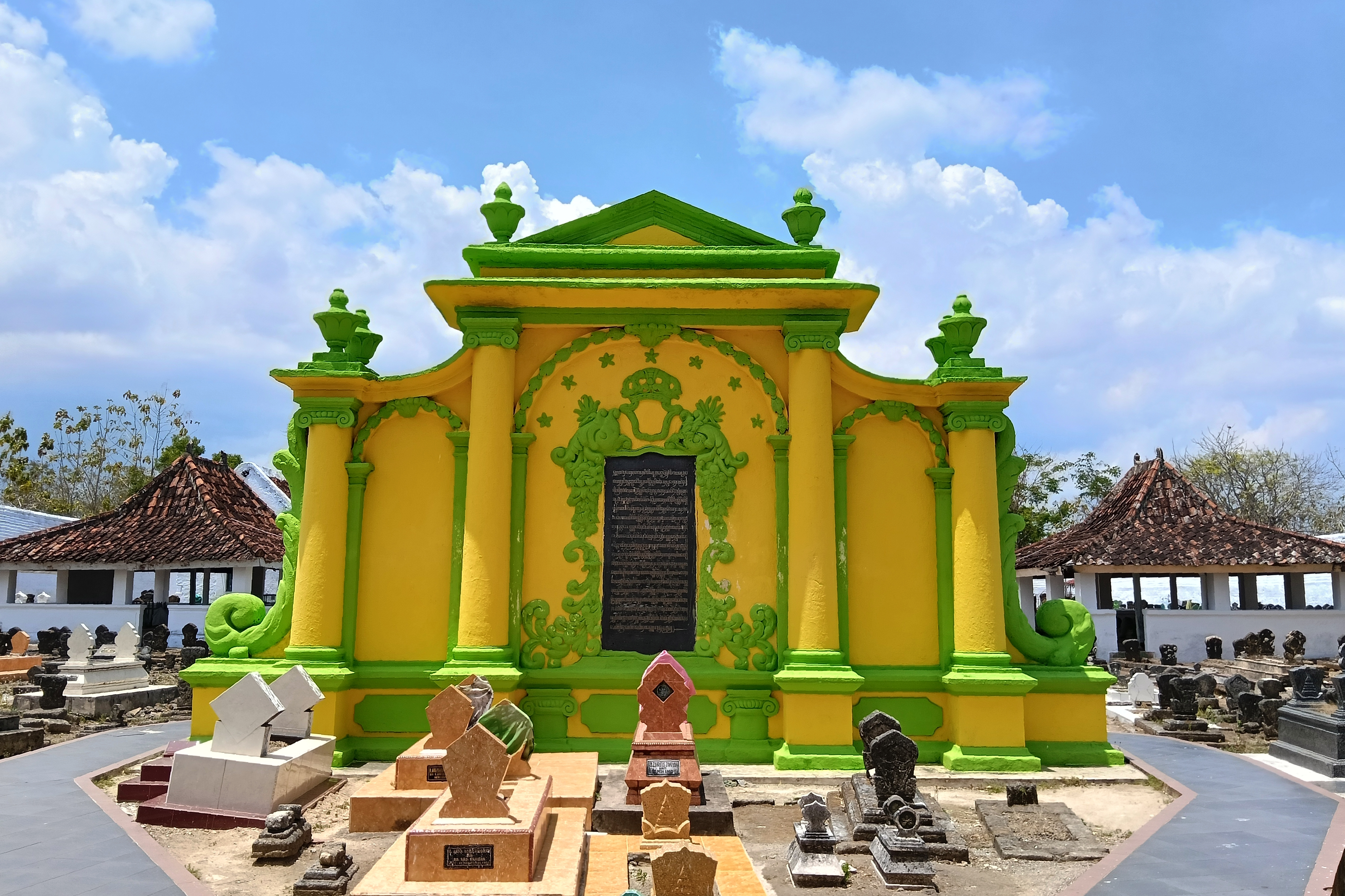
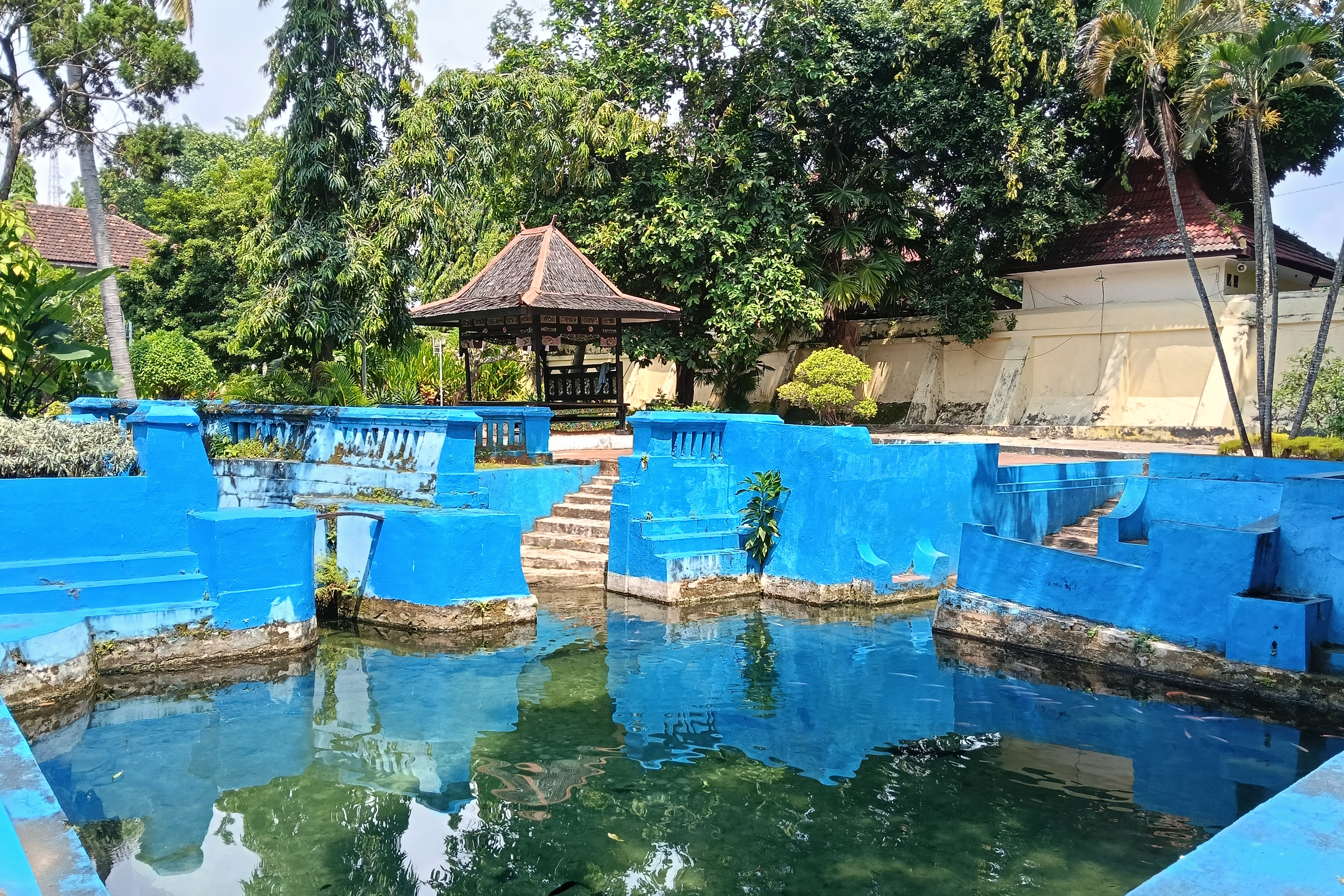
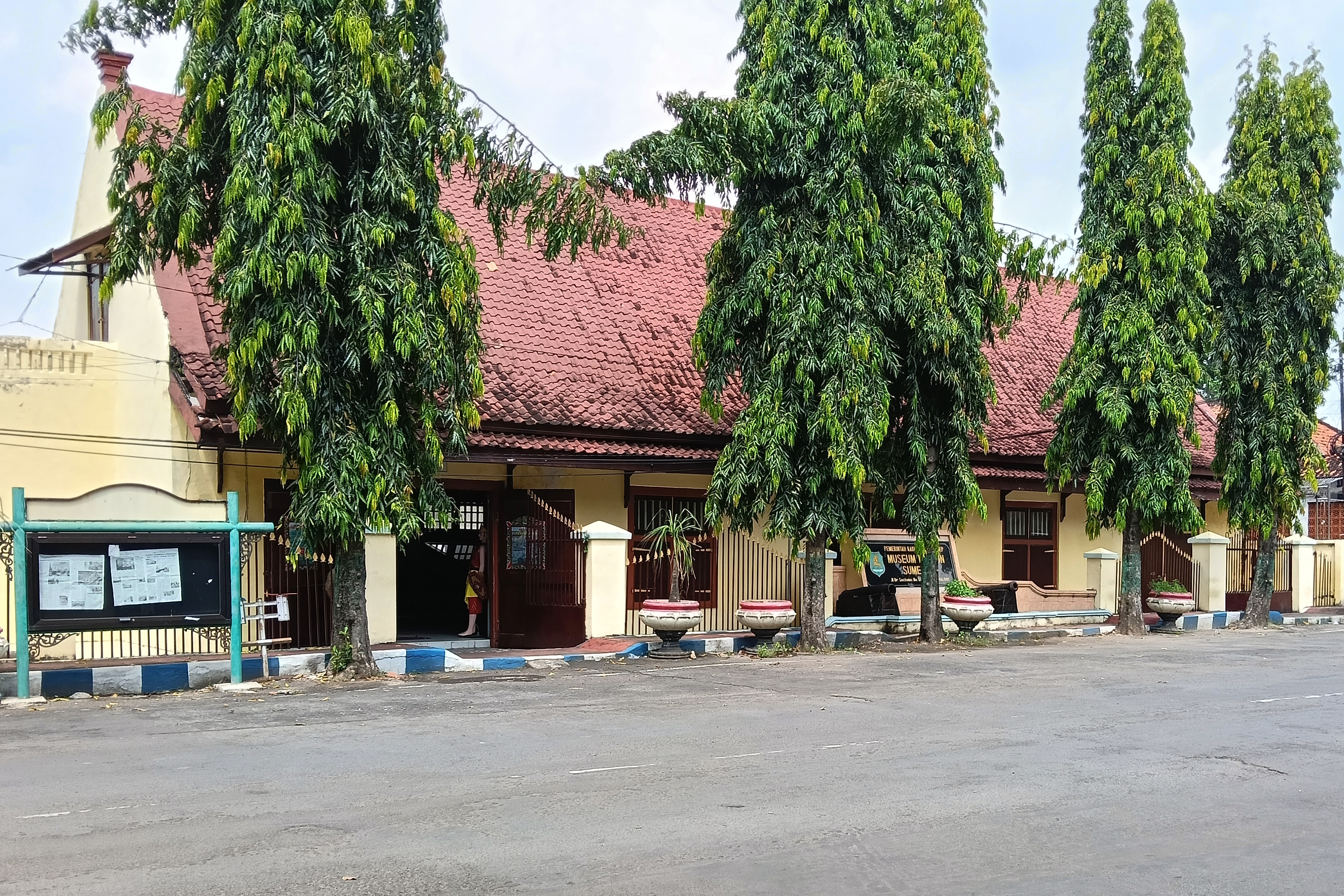
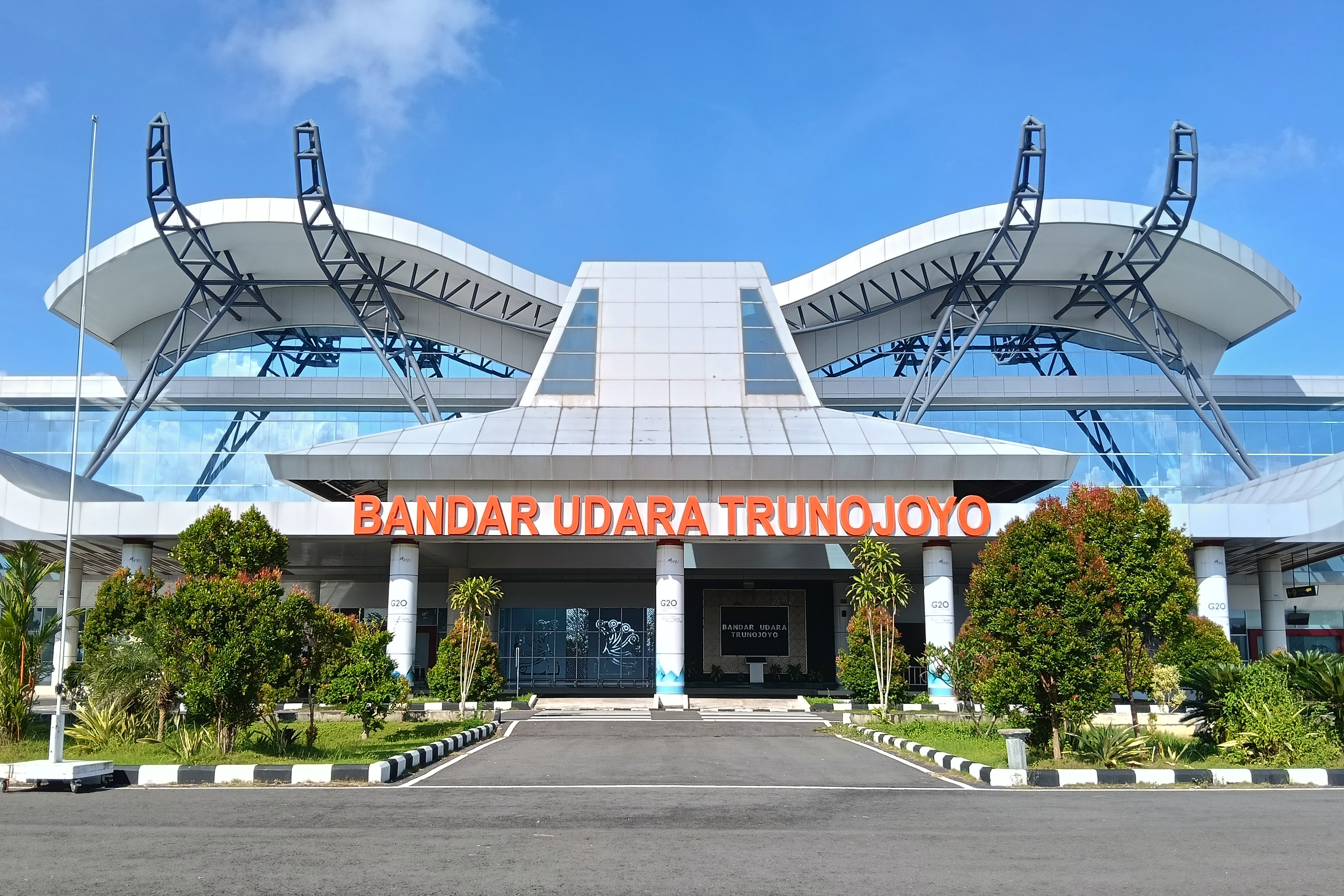
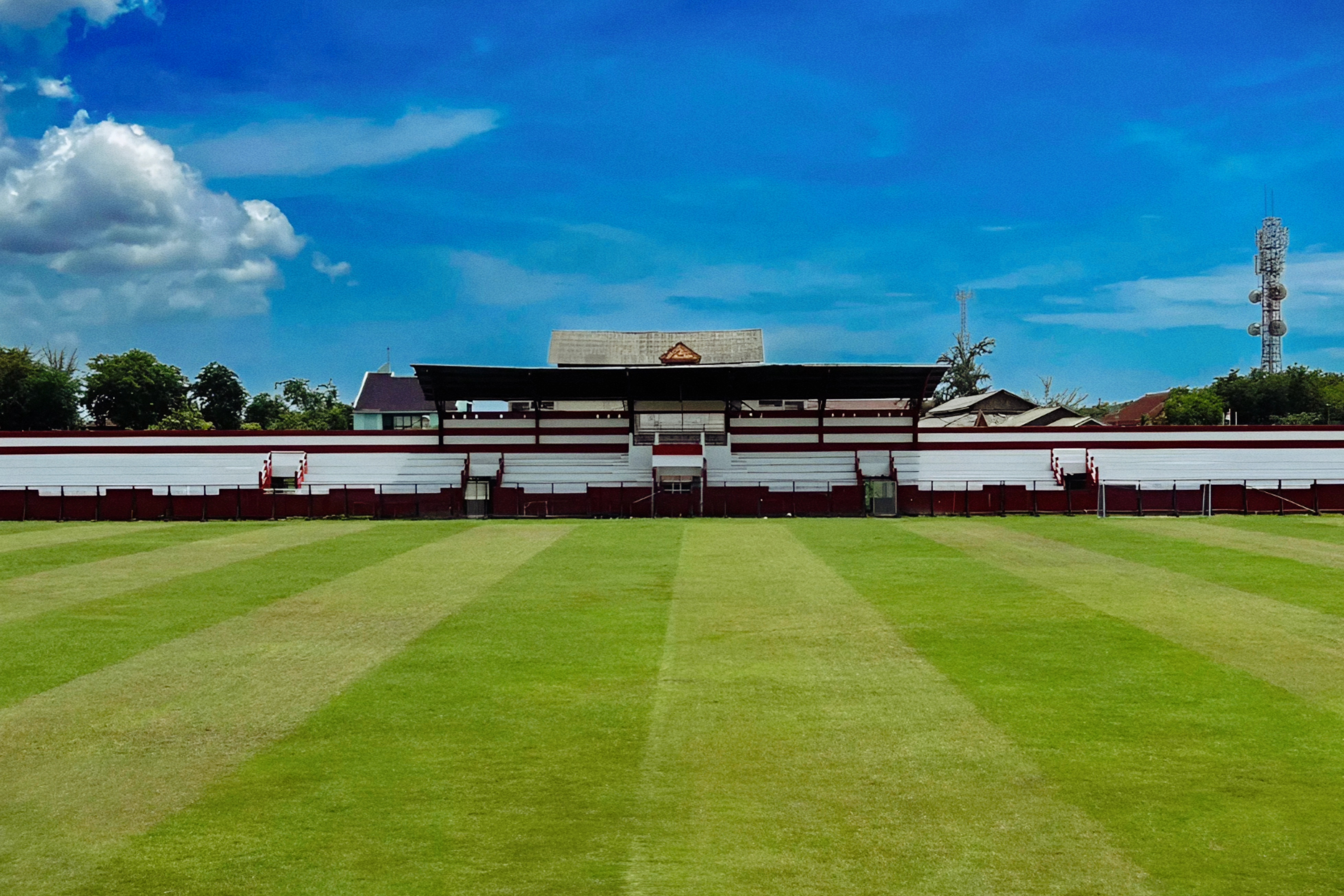
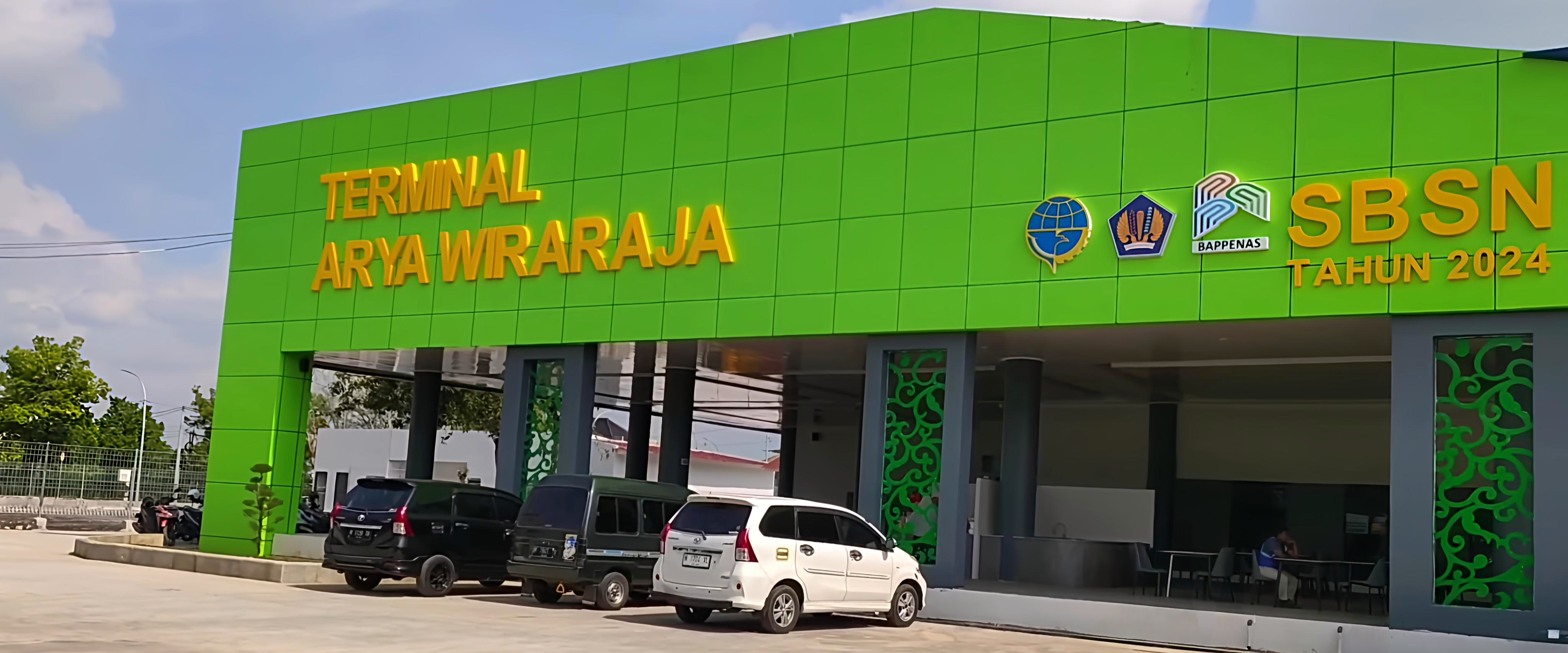
- Great Mosque of Sumenep Sumenep Palace Asta Tinggi Cemetery Taman Sare Water Castle Sumenep Palace Museum Trunojoyo Airport Ahmad Yani Stadium Arya Wiraraja bus station
- Nicknames: Kota Keris "Kris City", Kota Keraton "Kraton City", Kota Cemara Udang "Beach Sheoak City", others
- Motto: Songennep ta’ Abingker (unofficial) (Madurese for "Frameless Sumenep"); Word meaning: "Sumenepese are Wanderer"
- Location in Java and Indonesia Kota Sumenep (Indonesia)
- Coordinates: 7.001328818787373°S 113.869682245928°E
- Country: Indonesia
- Province: East Java
- Regency: Sumenep
- Capital: Pamolokan
- Subdivisions: 16 villages

Government
  - Head of district: Yudi Nursukmadyanto
  - District secretary: Parman
  - Head of government section: R.A Tayyibah
  - General subdivision: Mohammad Aprilla

Area
  - Total: 27.84 km^{2} (10.75 sq mi)
  - Rank: 26th in Sumenep
- Elevation: 8 m (26 ft)
- Highest elevation (Kebunagung Hill): 25 m (82 ft)
- Lowest elevation (Marengan River): 0 m (0 ft)

Population (mid 2025 estimate)
  - Total: 77,155
  - Rank: 2nd in Sumenep
  - Density: 2,707/km^{2} (7,010/sq mi)
  - Rank: 1st in Sumenep
- Demonym(s): Sumenepese (en); Sumenepan (id); Sumenebhân (mad); Sumeneban (jv)

Demographics
  - Ethnic groups: 94.7% Madurese; 1.5% Javanese; 1.3% Chinese; 0.9% Arabs; 1.6% Others
  - Religion: 98.71% Islam; 0.59% Catholicism; 0.57% Protestantism; 0.12% Buddhism; 0.01% Others
  - Languages: Indonesian (official); Madurese (native); Javanese; Others
- Time zone: UTC+7 (IWST)
- Postal code: 69412 – 69417
- Area code: (+62) 328
- Vehicle registration: M xxxx U*/V*/W*/X*/Y*/Z*
- Abbreviation: SMP
- Airport (main airport): Trunojoyo Airport
- Bus station (main bus station): Arya Wiraraja bus station
- Largest villages or wards by area: Pabian; 4.95 km^{2} (1.91 sq mi)
- Largest villages or wards by population: Kolor; 16,262 (2023 est)
- Website: kec-kota.sumenepkab.go.id

Other transcription(s)

Chinese name
- Traditional Chinese: 哥打蘇民納
- Simplified Chinese: 哥打苏民纳
- Postal: Kota Soominna
- Literal meaning: from Kota Sumenep, a phrase that means "Settled Water Town"
Transcriptions
Standard Mandarin
- Hanyu Pinyin: Gēdǎ Sūmínnà
- Bopomofo: ㄍㄜ ㄉㄚˇ ㄙㄨ ㄇㄧㄣˊ ㄋㄚˋ
- Gwoyeu Romatzyh: Gedaa Suminnah
- Wade–Giles: Ko^{1}-ta^{3} Su^{1}-min^{2}-na^{4}
- Tongyong Pinyin: Ge-dǎ Su-mín-nà
- IPA: [kɤ́.tà sú.mǐn.nâ]
other Mandarin
- Xiao'erjing: قْدَا سُمٍنَا
- Dungan: Гәда Суминна
- Sichuanese Pinyin: Go^{1}da^{3} Su^{1}min^{2}na^{2}
Wu
- Romanization: Ku^{平}-tan^{去} Su^{平}-min^{平}-neh^{入}
- Suzhounese: Kou^{1}-tan^{3} Sou^{1}-min^{2}-neq^{8}
Gan
- Romanization: Go da Su min lah
Xiang
- IPA: [ko˧ ta˦˩ sow˧ min˩˧ la˨˦]
Hakka
- Romanization: Go^{1}-da^{3} Su^{1}-min^{2}-nab^{6}
- Pha̍k-fa-sṳ: Kô-tá Sû-mìn-na̍p
Yue: Cantonese
- Yale Romanization: Gōdá Sōumàhnnaahp
- Jyutping: Go1 daa2 Sou1 man4 naap6
- IPA: [kɔ˥.ta˧˥ sɔw˥.mɐn˩.nap̚˨]
Southern Min
- Hokkien POJ: Ko-tá So͘-bîn-la̍p
- Tâi-lô: Ko-tá Soo-bîn-la̍p
- Teochew Peng'im: Go^{1}da^{2} Sou^{1}ming^{5}nab^{8}
Eastern Min
- Fuzhou BUC: Gŏ̤-dā Sŭ-mìng-năk
Pu-Xian Min
- Hinghwa BUC: Go̤-dâ So-míng-da̍h
Northern Min
- Jian'ou Romanized: Gó̤-dǎ Sú-měng-nà
Middle Chinese
- Middle Chinese: Ka taeng^{X} Su mjin nop

Alternative Chinese name
- Chinese: 漯水市
- Postal: Loshui Shih
- Literal meaning: "Lowland Water City"
Transcriptions
Standard Mandarin
- Hanyu Pinyin: Luòshuǐ Shì
- Bopomofo: ㄌㄨㄛˋ ㄕㄨㄟˇ ㄕˋ
- Gwoyeu Romatzyh: Luohshoei Shyh
- Wade–Giles: Lo^{4}-shui^{3} Shih^{4}
- Tongyong Pinyin: Luò-shuěi Shìh
- Yale Romanization: Lwò-shwěi Shr̀
- IPA: [lwô.ʂwèɪ ʂî]
other Mandarin
- Xiao'erjing: لُوَشُوِ شِ
- Dungan: Луәфи Шы
- Sichuanese Pinyin: No^{2}sui^{3} Si^{4}
Wu
- Romanization: Loh^{入}-sy^{去} Zy^{去}
- Suzhounese: Loh-syu Zy
Gan
- Romanization: Loh sui Si
Xiang
- IPA: [lo˨˦ ɕɥej˦˩ ʂʐ˨˩]
Hakka
- Romanization: Lok^{6}-sui^{3} Si^{4}
- Pha̍k-fa-sṳ: Lo̍k-súi Sṳ
Yue: Cantonese
- Yale Romanization: Lokséui Síh
- Jyutping: Lok3 seoi2 Si5
- IPA: [lɔk̚˧.sɵɥ˧˥ si˩˧]
Southern Min
- Hokkien POJ: Lo̍k-chúi Chhī
- Tâi-lô: Lo̍k-tsuí Tshī
- Teochew Peng'im: Log^{8}zui^{2} Ci^{6}
Eastern Min
- Fuzhou BUC: Lŏk-cūi Chê
Pu-Xian Min
- Hinghwa BUC: Lo̤̍h-cûi Sī
Northern Min
- Jian'ou Romanized: Lò̤-sṳ̌ Chī
Middle Chinese
- Middle Chinese: Lak sywij^{X} Dzyi^{X}

Arabic name
- Arabic: كوتا سومينيب; Kūtā Sūmīnīb

Dutch name
- Dutch: Kota Soemenep

Japanese name
- Japanese: コタ・スメネプ; Kota Sumenepu

Kota Sumenep, (Note: English: /ˈkoʊtə ˈsuːməˌnɛp/ KOH-tə SOOM-ə-nep Indonesian pronunciation: [ˈko.t̪a suˈmə.nǝp̚] In the regional languages of Kota Sumenep: Madurese: Kottha Songennep, pronounced [ˈkɔʈːa sɔˈŋǝnːǝp̚]; Javanese: Kutha Sungenep, pronounced [ˈku.ʈɔ suˈŋǝ.nǝp̚]) officially the Kota Sumenep District, (Note: Indonesian: Kecamatan Kota Sumenep; Madurese: Kacamadhân Kottha Songennep; Javanese: Kacamatan Kutha Sungenep) was previously known as Town of Samanap (Note: English: /ˈsæməˌnæp/ SAM-ə-nap) in English, is a town and district which serves as the regency seat of Sumenep Regency, in the East Java province of Indonesia. It is the second smallest and most highly populated district in Sumenep Regency, with an area of 27.84 square kilometres (10.75 sq mi) and the population of 77,155 as at 2025. The administrative capital is Pamolokan. On 29 June 2004, the western half of the Kota Sumenep District was removed and formed into a separate district, namely Batuan District.

This district is located 175 km east of Surabaya and 965 km east of Jakarta. Geographically, Kota Sumenep is near the southeastern coast of Madura island (but is separated from the sea by Kalianget District). Infrastructure and settlements from Sumenep Regency are also concentrated in this district, which is the center of government and economy for regency at the far eastern end of the island of Madura. Hugely prosperous in the eighteenth century, it is now a quiet, peaceful backwater, with its past glory still in evidence.

== Etymology ==
Kota Sumenep gained it is name from the combination of two words. The word Kota comes from Indonesian word kota which in turn comes from the Sanskrit word कोट्ट (koṭṭa) which means fort, fortress, castle, fortified house, fortification, works, city, town, or place encircled by walls. It is also used formally in a few other Indonesian towns (districts) and cities, for example; Kota Jantho, Kota Tambolaka, and Kota Waisai. It can also be used informally to refer to any towns (districts) or cities. Hence, a direct translation of the name Kota Sumenep into English would be "Town of Sumenep" or "Sumenep Town".

While, the name Sumenep originated from the language of Old Javanese people from the words of Sungeneb (Old Javanese: ᬲᬸᬗᭂᬦᭂᬩ᭄, romanized: Suṅĕnĕb) which means "the quiet valley", referring to most of the Kota Sumenep area which used to be land used by swamp deposits. Hence, Western writers often refer to Sumenep as Soemanap, Soemenap or Soemenep. In Bijdragen tot de kennis van de residentie Madoera (1858) published in Tijdschrift voor Nederlandsch Indië, J. Hageman stated that since the ruler of Sumenep, Tirtanegara replaced Cakranegara II in 1751, the word Sumenep was used officially as meaning "settled water" – bezonken water (in Dutch).

== Geography ==
Most of the Kota Sumenep District area is located in the lowlands, which around 46 percent is paddy fields, rivers and plantations, the remainder is in the form of residential land, offices or agencies, shops, industry and other urban infrastructure. It is bordered by the Manding District to the north, Gapura District to the east, Kalianget District to the southeast, and the Batuan District to the south and west.

=== Climate ===
Kota Sumenep has a tropical savanna climate (Aw) with May to November and heavy rainfall from December to April.

Climate data for Sumenep (Kalianget) (1991–2020 normals)
Month	Jan	Feb	Mar	Apr	May	Jun	Jul	Aug	Sep	Oct	Nov	Dec	Year
Mean daily maximum °C (°F)	31.3 (88.3)	31.4 (88.5)	32.0 (89.6)	31.7 (89.1)	31.7 (89.1)	31.0 (87.8)	30.8 (87.4)	31.0 (87.8)	32.2 (90.0)	33.1 (91.6)	32.8 (91.0)	31.8 (89.2)	31.7 (89.1)
Daily mean °C (°F)	27.8 (82.0)	27.7 (81.9)	27.8 (82.0)	28.1 (82.6)	28.4 (83.1)	28.0 (82.4)	27.5 (81.5)	27.8 (82.0)	28.4 (83.1)	29.1 (84.4)	29.0 (84.2)	28.0 (82.4)	28.1 (82.6)
Mean daily minimum °C (°F)	25.0 (77.0)	24.9 (76.8)	25.1 (77.2)	25.3 (77.5)	25.6 (78.1)	25.1 (77.2)	24.7 (76.5)	24.8 (76.6)	25.2 (77.4)	25.9 (78.6)	26.0 (78.8)	25.2 (77.4)	25.2 (77.4)
Average precipitation mm (inches)	253.6 (9.98)	217.3 (8.56)	187.1 (7.37)	144.5 (5.69)	97.3 (3.83)	58.8 (2.31)	27.9 (1.10)	4.0 (0.16)	7.6 (0.30)	39.4 (1.55)	91.7 (3.61)	249.0 (9.80)	1,378.2 (54.26)
Average precipitation days	16.1	14.8	14.0	11.8	7.0	4.1	2.4	0.6	0.9	2.7	7.7	16.0	98.1
Mean monthly sunshine hours	135.9	133.4	165.4	173.5	236.1	239.5	268.9	297.5	288.4	289.1	207.8	122.1	2,557.6
Source: Starlings Roost Weather

== Government ==
Kota Sumenep is led by a head of district who is then assisted by a district secretary or secretariat in carrying out his duties. The current head of the Kota Sumenep District is Yudi Nursukmadyanto, who has served since 2024 and is assisted by a district secretary named Parman.

=== Administrative divisions ===
Administratively, the Kota Sumenep District area has 12 villages (desa) and 4 urban villages/wards (kelurahan) which are divided into 57 hamlets (dusun) or neighborhoods (lingkungan). The following is a list of names of the villages (desa and kelurahan) located in Kota Sumenep District:

Name Village or Ward	Area in km^{2}	Pop'n estimate 2021	Number of hamlets	Postal code	Ministry of Affairs code
Kolor	3.24	12,845	5	69417	35.29.01.2005
Pabian	4.95	6,468	4	69417	35.29.01.2006
Marengan Daya	0.95	2,251	4	69417	35.29.01.2007
Kacongan	2.24	2,173	4	69417	35.29.01.2008
Paberasan	4.09	4,283	4	69417	35.29.01.2009
Parsanga	3.18	5,047	3	69417	35.29.01.2010
Bangkal	0.41	2,348	3	69417	35.29.01.2011
Pangarangan	0.53	5,297	3	69412	35.29.01.2014
Kepanjin*	0.33	3,200	4	69415	35.29.01.2015
Pajagalan*	0.65	3,926	2	69416	35.29.01.2016
Bangselok*	0.43	4,972	4	69416	35.29.01.2017
Karangduak*	0.30	3,724	4	69417	35.29.01.2018
Pandian	0.73	4,418	3	69414	35.29.01.2019
Pamolokan**	1.74	7,934	4	69412	35.29.01.2013
Kebunan	1.54	3,130	3	69417	35.29.01.2012
Kebunagung	2.52	2,773	3	69413	35.29.01.2020

Note: (*) urban village/ward (kelurahan).
(**) administrative capital.
