= Sumenep Regency =

Regency in East Java, Indonesia

Sumenep Regency Kabupaten Sumenep: Sungeneb; Purwareja; Sumekar
- Regency

Regional transcription(s)
  - Madurese: Songennep (Latèn) سَوڠۤنّۤڤ (Pèghun) ꦯꦺꦴꦔꦼꦤ꧀ꦤꦼꦥ꧀ (Carakan)
  - Bajonese: Sangenep (Latin) سَڠٓنٓڤْ (Jawi) ᨔᨂᨛᨊᨛ (Lontara’)
  - Javanese: Sungenep (Gedrig) سوڠۤنۤڤ (Pégon) ꦯꦸꦔꦼꦤꦼꦥ꧀ (Hanacaraka)
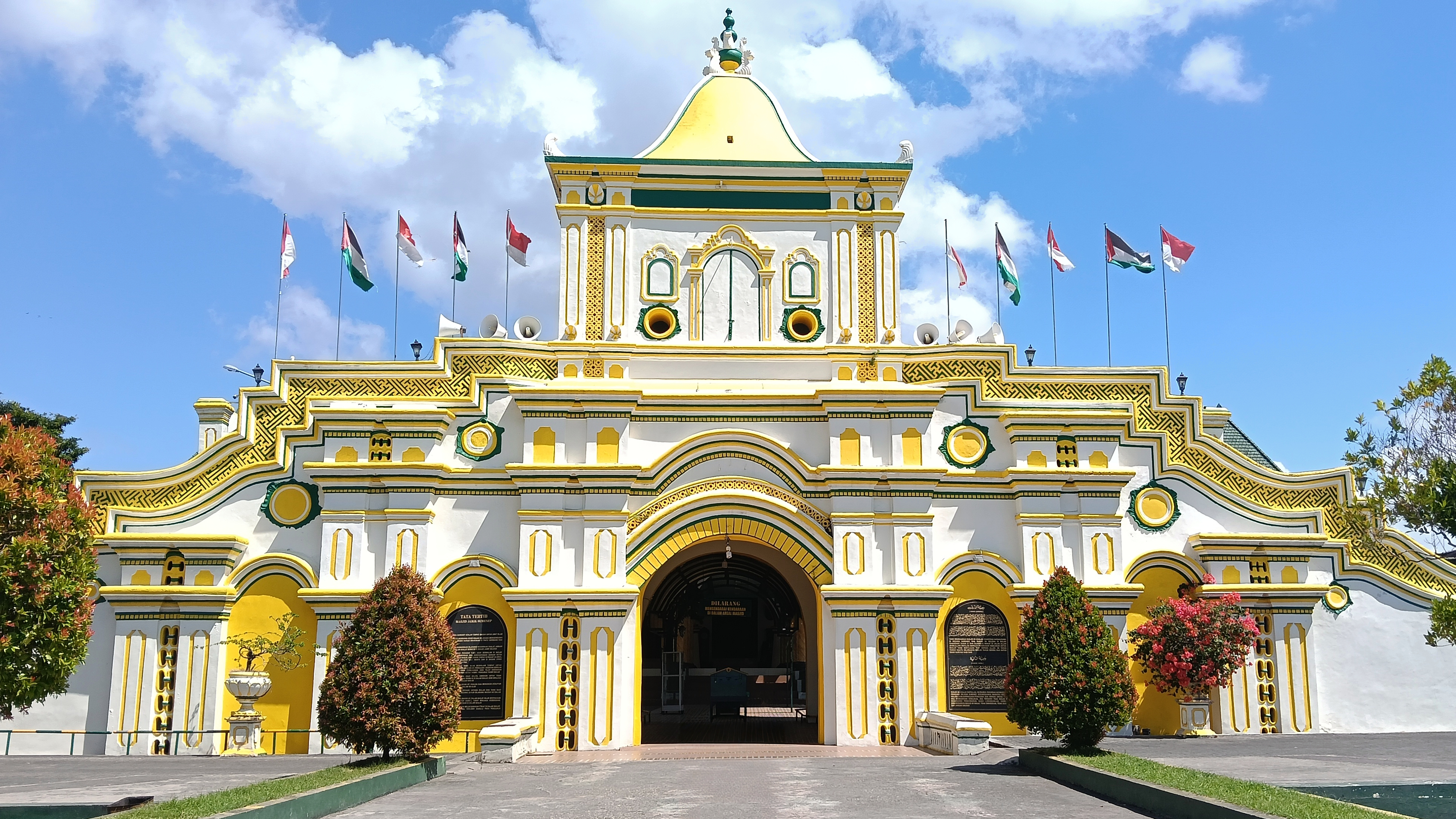
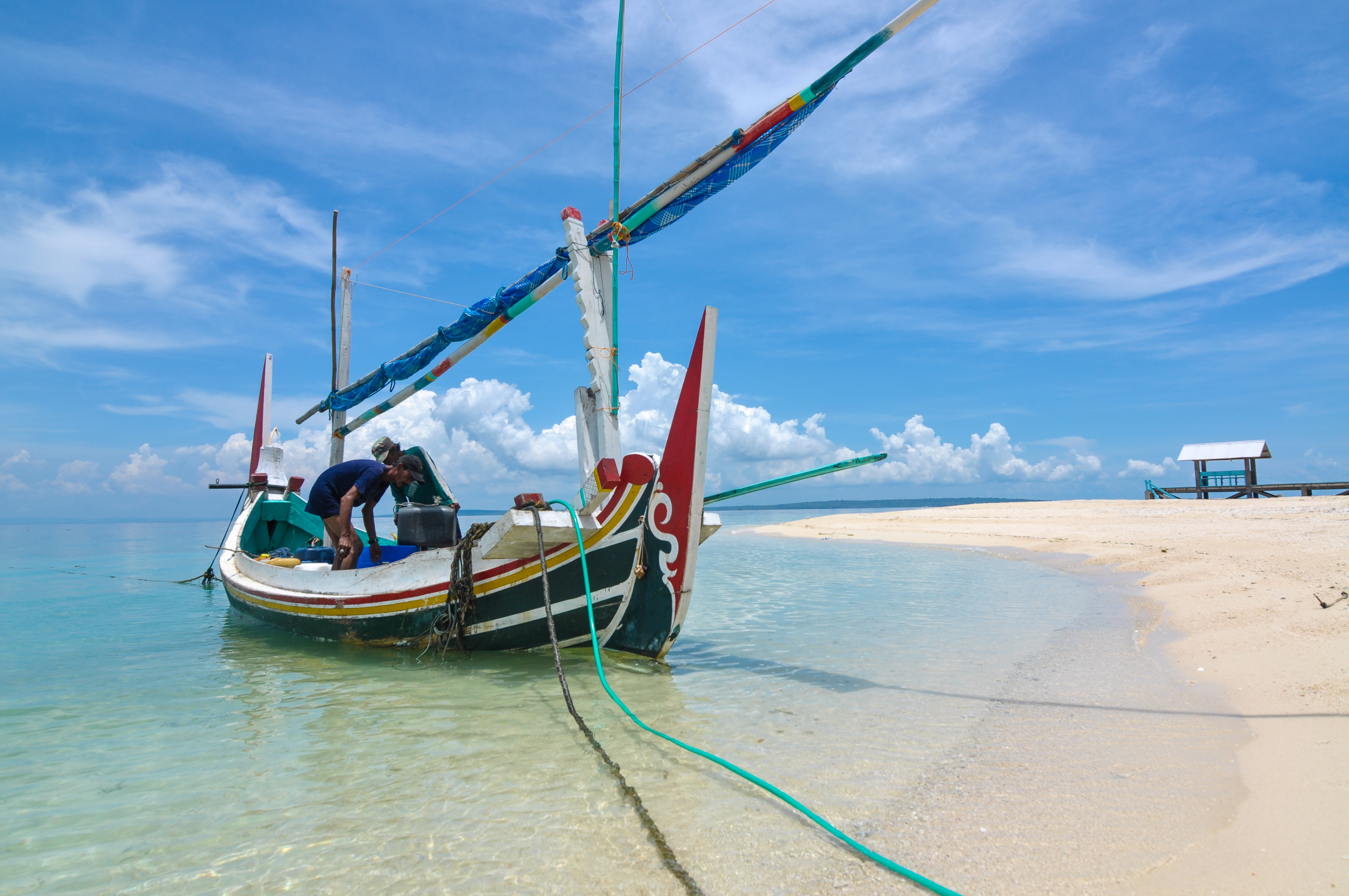
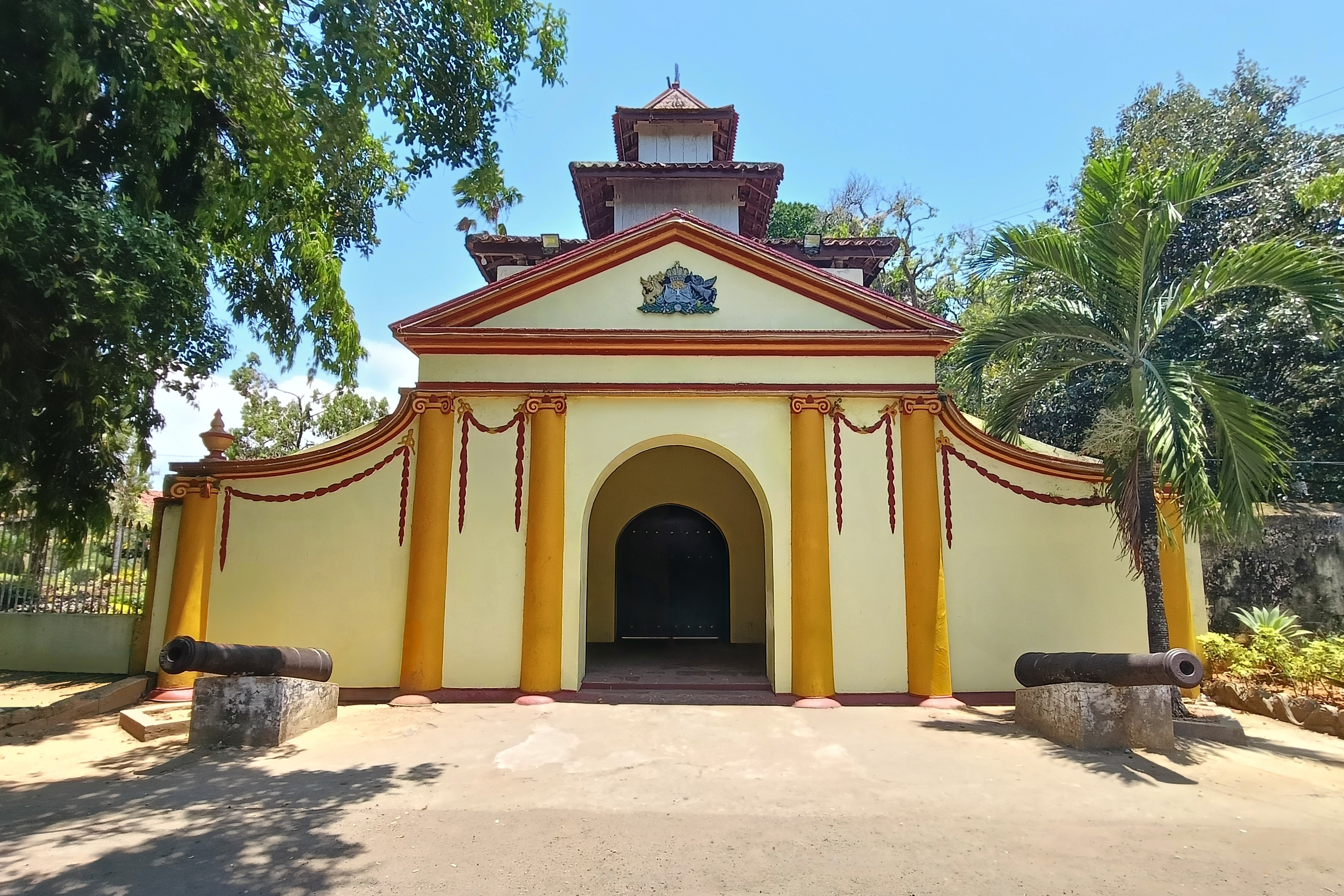
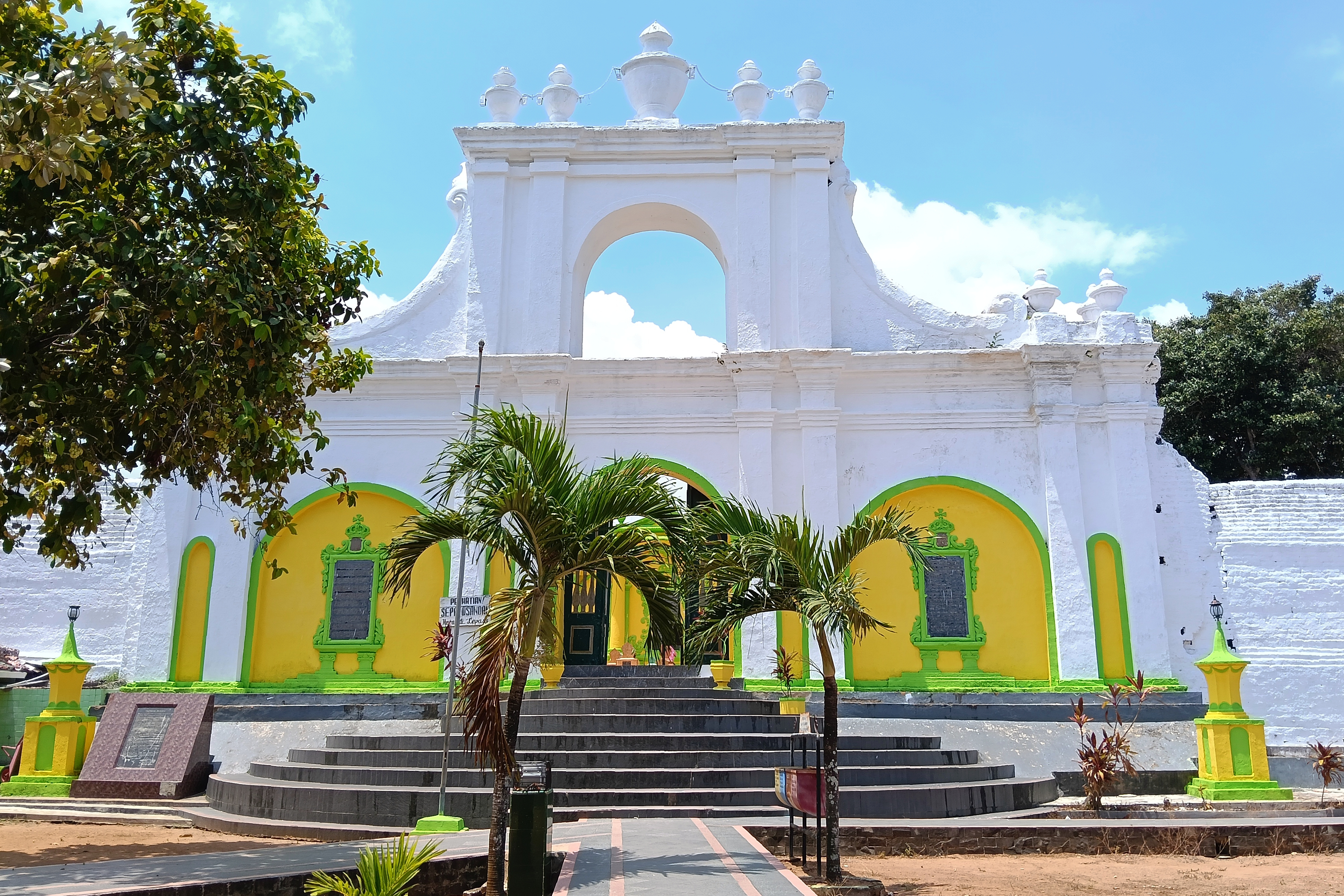
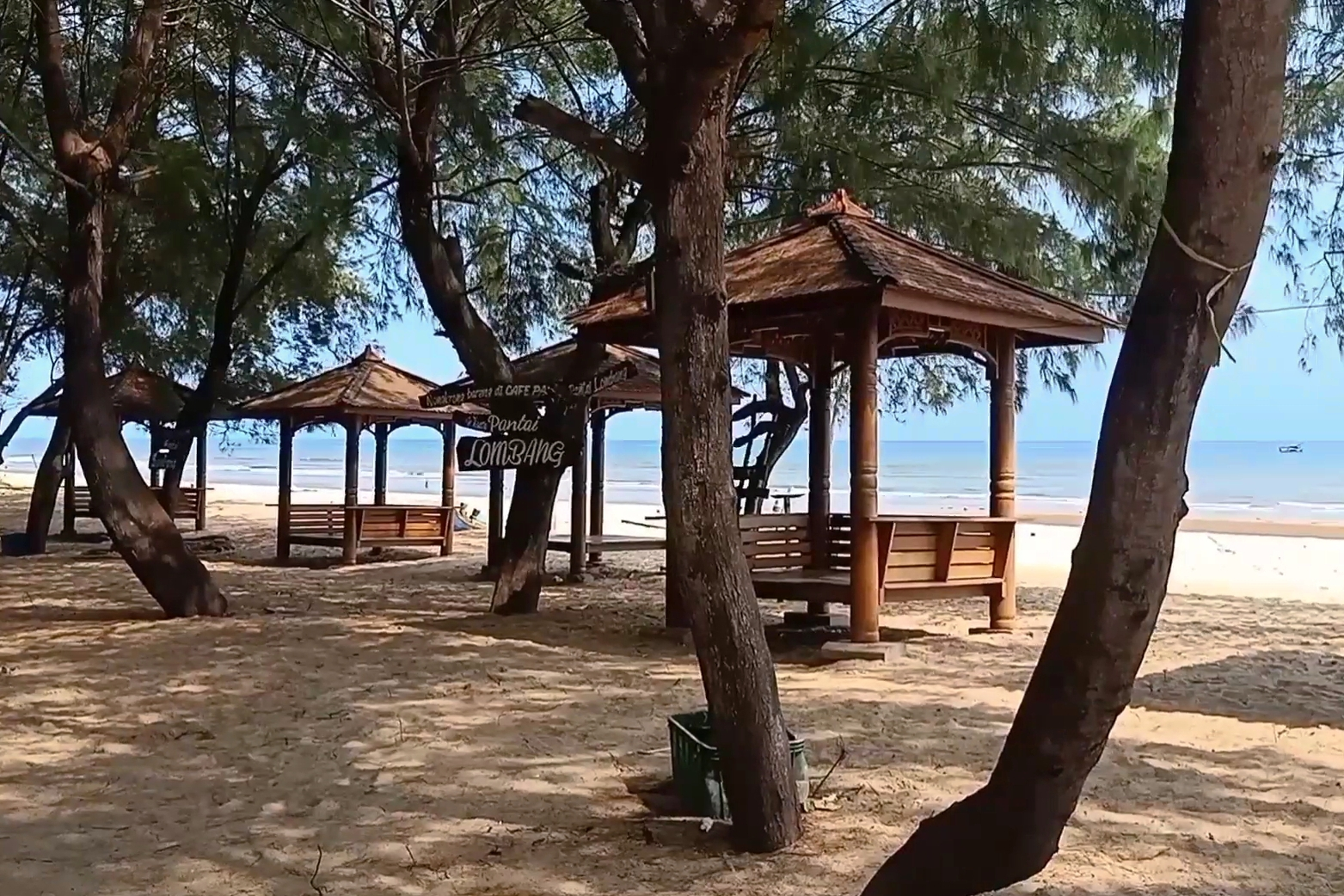
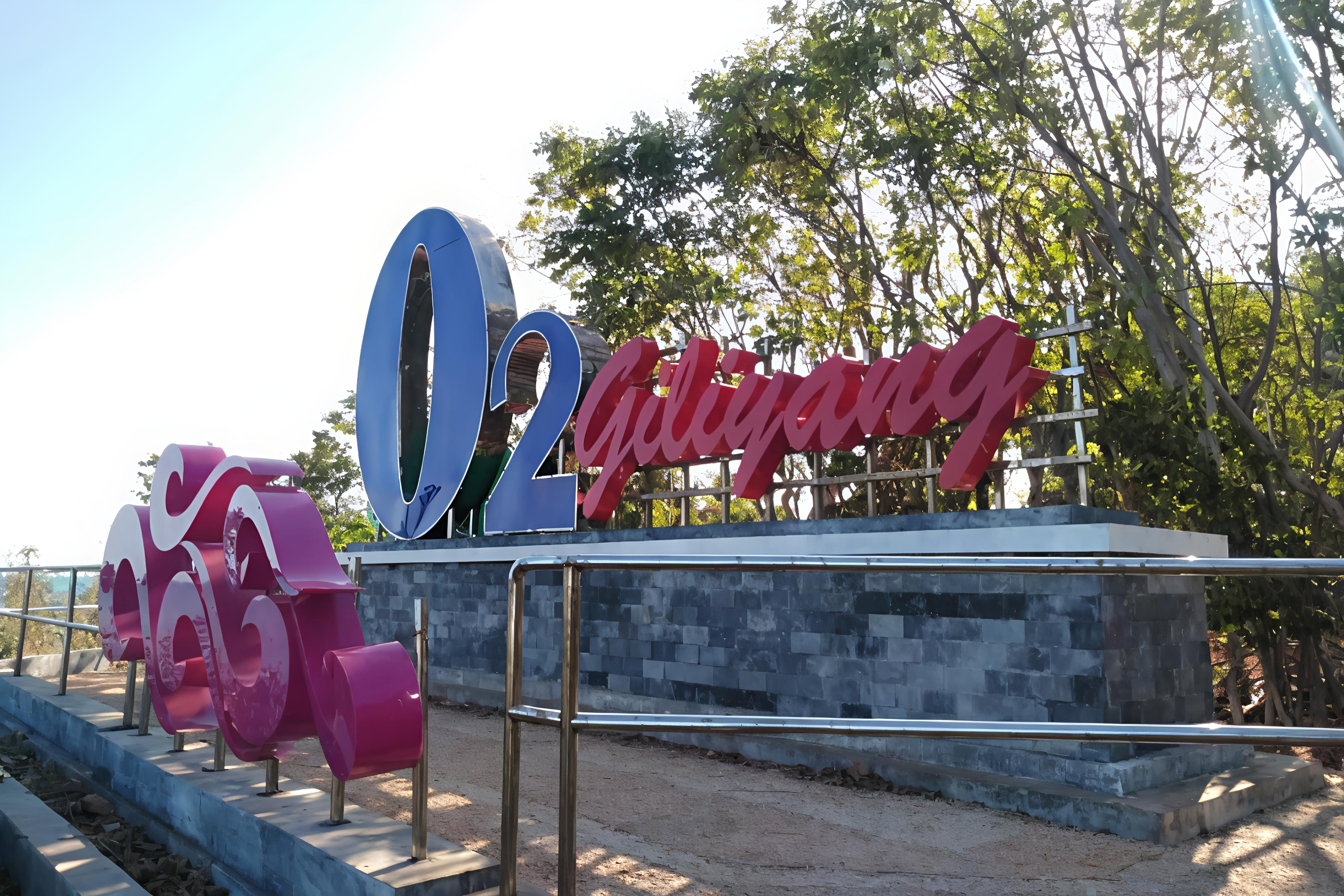
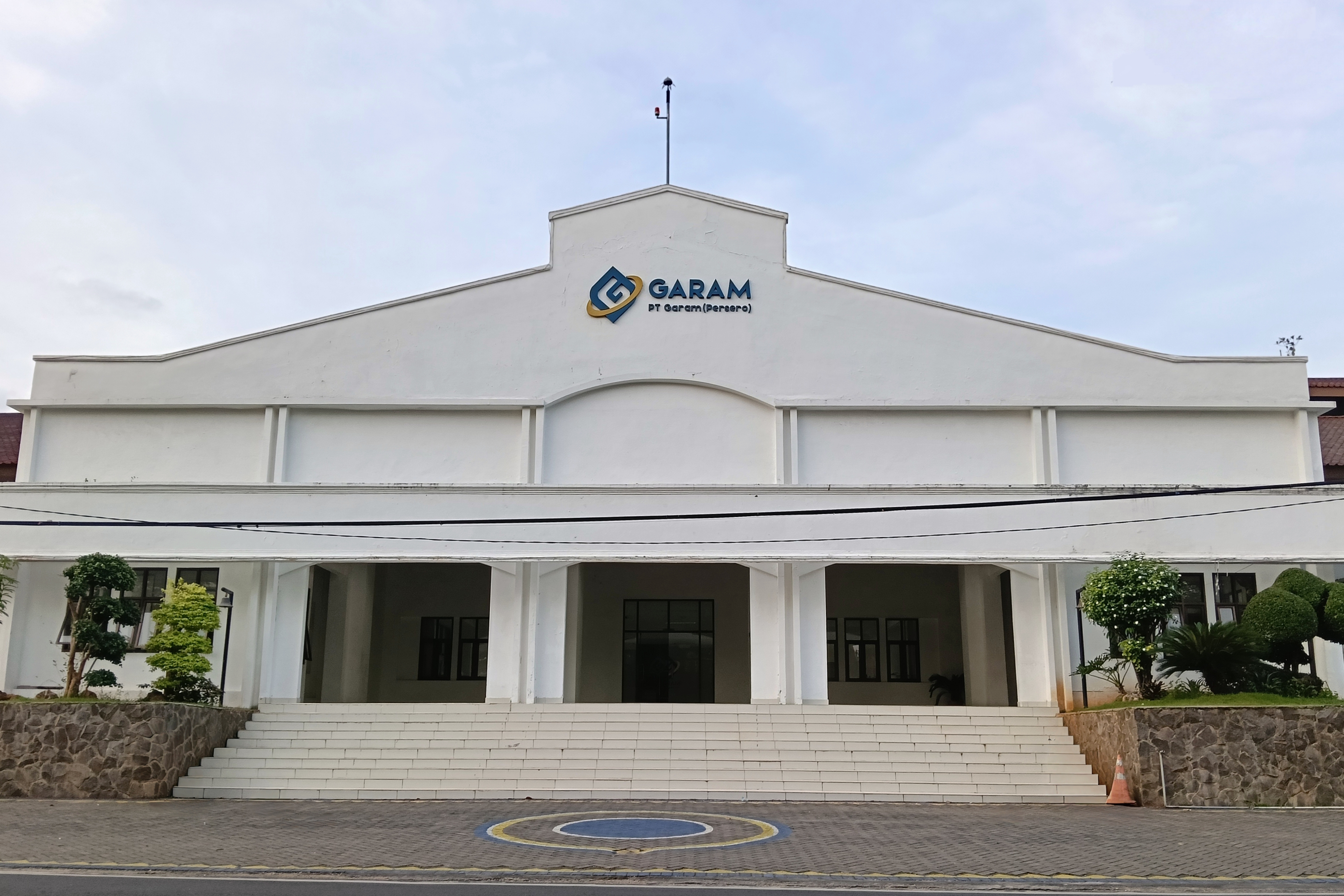
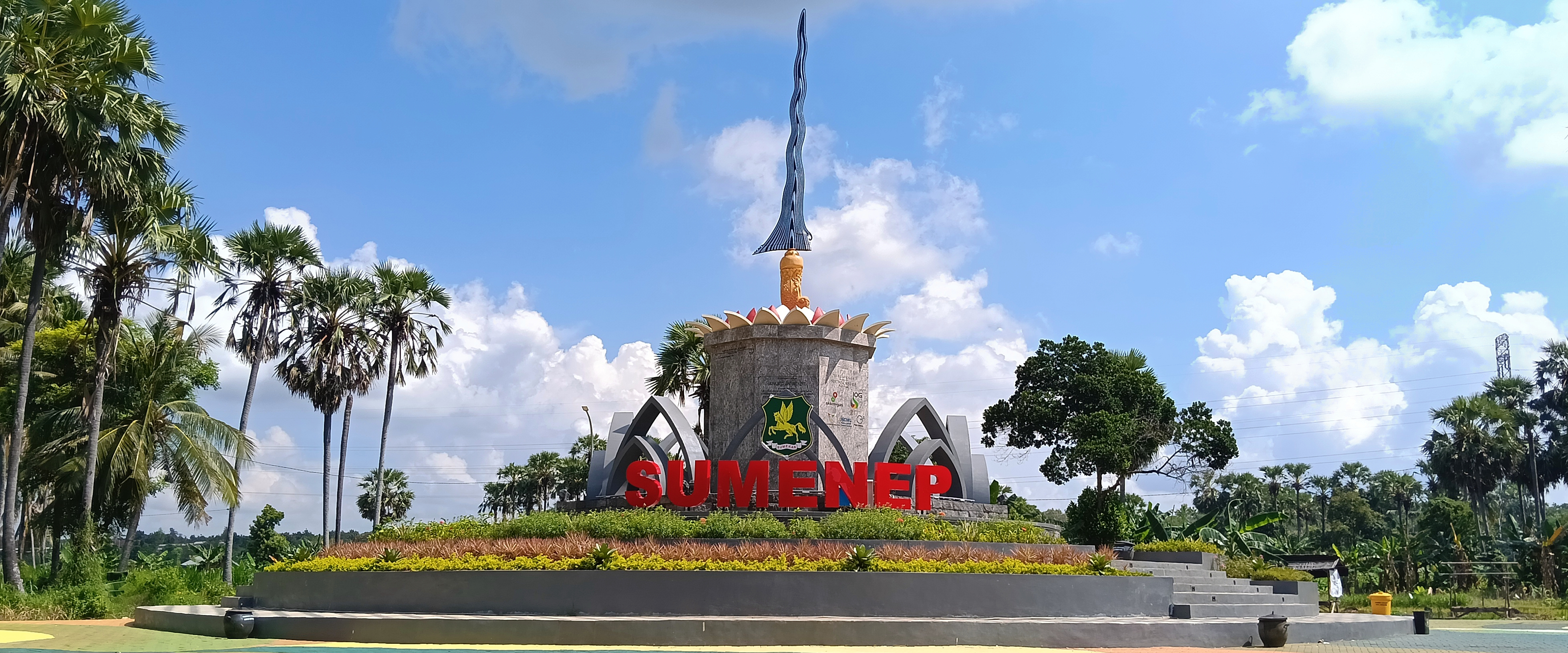
- Great Mosque of Sumenep Gili Labak Island Sumenep Palace Asta Tinggi Cemetery Lombang Beach Gili Iyang Island Kalianget Old Town Kris Arya Wiraraja Monument

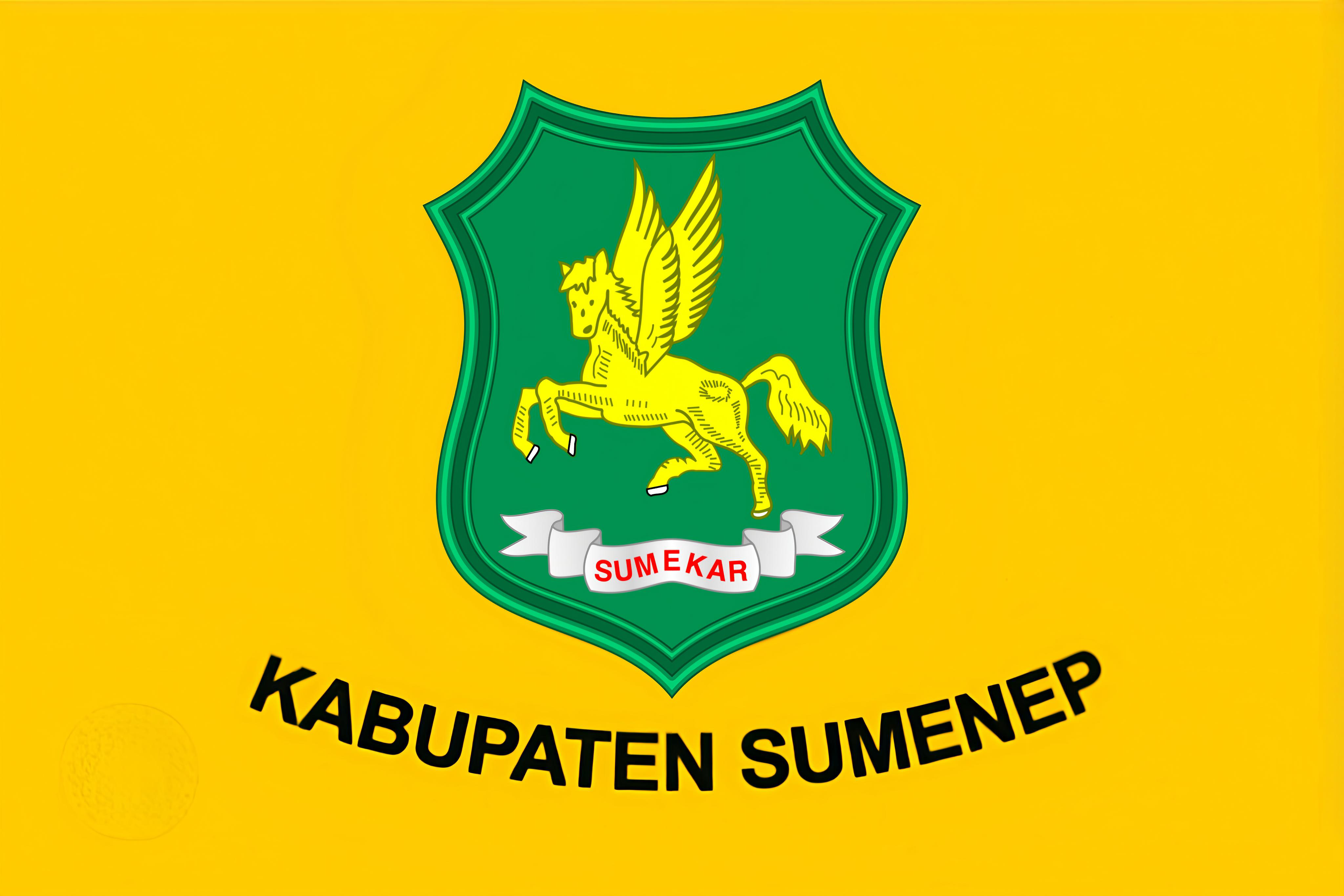
- Flag Coat of arms
- Nicknames: Bumi Sumekar "Land of the Sumekar", Bumi Garam "Land of Salt", Solonya Madura "Solo of Madura", etc
- Motto: Sumekar (Old Javanese for "Blooming"); Word meaning: "Always Developing"
- Location within East Java

- Location in Java and Indonesia Sumenep Regency (Indonesia)
- Coordinates: 7°01′S 113°52′E
- Country: Indonesia
- Province: East Java
- Incorporated: 8 August 1950
- Legal basis: Law No. 12/1950
- Anniversary: 31 October 1269; 756 years ago
- Founded by: Arya Wiraraja
- Named for: Sungeneb (Old Javanese) lit. ''the quiet valley''
- Capital: Kota Sumenep
- Subdivisions: 27 districts

Government
  - Type: Regency of East Java
  - Body: Sumenep Regency Government
  - Regent: Achmad Fauzi
  - Vice regent: Imam Hasyim
  - Regional secretary: Agus Dwi Saputra
  - Speaker of the regional parliament: Zainal Arifin

Area
  - Land: 2,093.50 km^{2} (808.30 sq mi)
  - Water: 9,319.65 km^{2} (3,598.34 sq mi)
  - Rank: 5th in East Java
- Elevation: 25 m (82 ft)
- Highest elevation (Mount Tembuku): 471 m (1,545 ft)
- Lowest elevation (Java Sea): 0 m (0 ft)

Population (mid 2025 estimate)
  - Total: 1,150,574
  - Rank: 15th in East Java
  - Density: 550/km^{2} (1,400/sq mi)
  - Rank: 35th in East Java
- Demonym(s): Sumenepese (en); Sumenepan (id); Sumenebhân (mad); Sumeneban (jv)

Demographics
  - Ethnic groups: 94.98% Madurese; 2.58% Bajonese; 0.93% Javanese; 0.65% Mandarese; 0.31% Buginese; 0.14% Chinese; 0.07% Arabs; 0.34% Others
  - Religion: 99.88% Islam; 0.05% Protestantism; 0.04% Catholicism; 0.02% Buddhism; 0.01% Others
  - Languages: Indonesian (official); Madurese (native); Bajonese; Mandarese; Buginese; Javanese; Others
- Time zone: UTC+7 (IWST)
- Postal code: 69412 – 69493
- Area code: (+62) 328 (mainland) (+62) 327 (maritime)
- Vehicle registration: M xxxx U*/V*/W*/X*/Y*/Z*
- Nominal GRDP: 2023
- Total: Rp 42.847 billion US$ 2.765 billion
- Per capita: Rp 37,370; US$ 2,412
- Growth: ▲5.3%
- HDI (2025): ▲0.705 – high
- Airport (main airport): Trunojoyo Airport
- Seaport (main seaport): Port of Kalianget
- Bus station (main bus station): Arya Wiraraja bus station
- Regional slogan: Bismillah Melayani "Serving in God's name"
- Tourism slogan: Visit Sumenep, The Soul of Madura
- Floral emblem: Beach sheoak (Casuarina equisetifolia)
- Faunal emblem: Maduran cattle (B. indicus × B. javanicus)
- Website: sumenepkab.go.id
- Endemic flowers Kamandin saebo (Glossocardia leschenaultii), restricted to the Guluk Guluk District Endemic trees Kangean almond (Terminalia kangeanensis), restricted to the Kangean Island Endemic mammals Raas cat (Felis catus), restricted to the Raas Island Endemic birds Abbott's cockatoo (Cacatua sulphurea abbotti), restricted to the Masakambing Island

Sumenep, (Note: English: /ˈsuːməˌnɛp/ SOOM-ə-nep Indonesian pronunciation: [suˈmǝ.nǝp̚] In the regional languages of Sumenep: Madurese: Songennep, pronounced [sɔˈŋǝnːǝp̚]; Bajonese: Sangenep, pronounced [saˈŋǝ.nǝp̚]; Javanese: Sungenep, pronounced [suˈŋǝ.nǝp̚]) officially the Sumenep Regency, (Note: Indonesian: Kabupaten Sumenep; Madurese: Kabhupatèn Songennep; Bajonese: Kabupatén Sangenep; Javanese: Kabupatèn Sungenep) was previously known as Samanap (Note: English: /ˈsæməˌnæp/ SAM-ə-nap) or Zamanap (Note: English: /ˈzæməˌnæp/ ZAM-ə-nap) in English, is a regency of the East Java province, Indonesia. It covers a land area of 2,093.50 square kilometres (808.30 sq mi) and had a population of 1,150,574 (comprising 48.275% males and 51.725% females) as at mid 2025. The administrative capital is Kota Sumenep, has a name that reflects it is historical and cultural evolution. Formerly, the area was briefly known as Sungeneb (Note: Old Javanese: ᬲᬸᬗᭂᬦᭂᬩ᭄, romanized: Suṅĕnĕb, pronounced [suˈŋǝ.nǝb̚]; lit. ''the quiet valley''; Madurese: Songènèb, pronounced [sɔˈŋɛ.nɛb̚]) in the 13th century, Purwareja (Note: Old Javanese: ᬧᬹᬃᬯ᭄ᬯᬋᬚ, romanized: Pūrwarĕja, pronounced [pʊr.waˈrǝ.d͡ʒa]; lit. ''the beginning of prosperity''; Madurese: Porbârejhâ, pronounced [pɔr.bɤˈrǝ.cʰɤ]) in the 15th century, and Sumekar (Note: Old Javanese: ᬲᬸᬫᭂᬓᬃ, romanized: Sumĕkar, pronounced [suˈmǝ.kar]; lit. ''the blooming''; Madurese: Somekkar, pronounced [sɔˈmǝkːar]) in the 16th century.

The regency occupies the eastern end of Madura island and also includes numerous smaller islands to the east (primarily Talango Island, the Sapudi Islands, and the Kangean Islands), to the north (the Masalembu Islands), and to the south (the Giligenteng Islands) of Madura. It is bordered by the Pamekasan Regency to the west, Madura Strait to the south, and the Java Sea to the north and east. The airport nearby is Trunojoyo Airport with flights to Surabaya.

== Geography ==
Sumenep Regency is located at the eastern end of Madura Island; it also includes 126 scattered islands located between 113 ° 32'54 "-116 ° 16'48" East Longitude and between 4 ° 55'-7 ° 24 'South latitude. The regency is bordered to the south by the Strait of Madura and the Bali Sea, to the north by the Java Sea, to the west by Pamekasan Regency (the only land border), and to the east by the Java Sea and the Flores Sea.

Kota Sumenep is located inland, and is separated from the Madura Strait by Kalianget District (and Talango Island).

=== Area ===
The total land area of Sumenep Regency is 2,093.47 km^{2}: this was formerly quoted as comprising 179.32 km^{2} of settlements, 423.96 km^{2} of forest, 14.68 km^{2} of grass area or vacant land, 1,130.19 km^{2} of farm/moor/bush/field, 59.07 km^{2} of pool/aquaculture/brackish water/lakes/reservoirs/wetlands, and 63.41 km^{2} of "other" areas. The marine area of Sumenep Regency, with its vast diversity of marine resources and potential for fishery, is about 9,319.65 km^{2}.

=== Climate ===
Sumenep has a tropical savanna climate (Aw) with May to November and heavy rainfall from December to April.

Climate data for Sumenep
Month	Jan	Feb	Mar	Apr	May	Jun	Jul	Aug	Sep	Oct	Nov	Dec	Year
Mean daily maximum °C (°F)	30.7 (87.3)	30.9 (87.6)	31.1 (88.0)	31.8 (89.2)	31.7 (89.1)	31.3 (88.3)	31.1 (88.0)	31.4 (88.5)	32.1 (89.8)	32.7 (90.9)	32.7 (90.9)	31.5 (88.7)	31.6 (88.9)
Daily mean °C (°F)	26.4 (79.5)	26.6 (79.9)	26.9 (80.4)	27.4 (81.3)	27.3 (81.1)	26.8 (80.2)	26.5 (79.7)	26.6 (79.9)	27.1 (80.8)	27.8 (82.0)	27.8 (82.0)	27.1 (80.8)	27.0 (80.6)
Mean daily minimum °C (°F)	22.2 (72.0)	22.4 (72.3)	22.7 (72.9)	23.0 (73.4)	22.9 (73.2)	22.4 (72.3)	21.9 (71.4)	21.8 (71.2)	22.2 (72.0)	22.9 (73.2)	23.0 (73.4)	22.7 (72.9)	22.5 (72.5)
Average rainfall mm (inches)	275 (10.8)	246 (9.7)	244 (9.6)	168 (6.6)	122 (4.8)	74 (2.9)	37 (1.5)	8 (0.3)	7 (0.3)	37 (1.5)	112 (4.4)	237 (9.3)	1,567 (61.7)
Source: Climate-Data.org

== Administrative districts ==
Sumenep Regency is divided into twenty-seven districts (kecamatan), listed below with their areas and their populations at the 2010 census and the 2020 census, together with the official estimates as of mid-2024. The table also includes the location of the district administrative centres, the number of administrative villages or urban subdistricts in each district (totaling 328 rural desa and 4 urban kelurahan - the latter all in Kota Sumenep District), and their postcodes.

Sumenep Regency, besides including the eastern quarter of Madura Island, also includes many offshore islands - notably the Kangean Islands to the east of Madura, the smaller Sapudi Islands lying between Madura and the Kangean Islands, and Talango Island closer to Madura; it also includes the small Masalembu Islands to the north (between Madura and Kalimantan) and the Giligenteng Islands to the southeast of Madura. The mainland (i.e. the area on Madura Island itself) covers 1,156.07 km^{2} (with 817,411 inhabitants in mid 2025) consisting of 18 districts, while the various island districts are 937.40 km^{2} in area (with 333,163 people in mid 2025), comprising 9 districts, with 128 islands, 46 inhabited.

Kode Wilayah	Name of District (kecamatan)	Area in km^{2}	Pop'n 2010 census	Pop'n 2020 census	Pop'n mid 2025 estimate	Admin centre	No. of villages	Post codes
35.29.11	Pragaan	57.84	65,152	65,764	67,883	Pragaan Laok	14	69465
35.29.05	Bluto	51.25	45,142	47,025	50,287	Bunbungan	20	69466
35.29.06	Saronggi	67.71	34,282	36,880	39,361	Tanah Merah	14	69467
35.29.08	Giligenteng (islands)	30.32	26,524	24,411	24,506	Aenganyar	8	69482
35.29.04	Talango (island)	50.27	36,737	38,400	39,070	Talango	8	69481
35.29.02	Kalianget	30.19	39,253	41,713	42,957	Kalianget Timur	7	69471
35.29.01	Kota Sumenep	27.84	70,744	75,367	77,155	Pamolokan	16 ^{(a)}	69412: 69417
35.29.26	Batuan	27.10	12,097	13,412	14,017	Batuan	7	69451
35.29.07	Lenteng	71.41	56,777	61,073	62,984	Ellak Laok	20	69461
35.29.10	Ganding	53.97	35,671	36,571	37,671	Ketawang Larangan	14	69462
35.29.09	Guluk Guluk	59.57	50,803	50,384	50,856	Guluk-Guluk	12	69463
35.29.13	Pasongsongan	119.03	43,221	51,713	52,532	Panaongan	10	69457
35.29.12	Ambunten	50.54	37,702	40,048	40,973	Ambunten Timur	15	69455
35.29.15	Rubaru	84.46	36,453	39,224	41,020	Rubaru	11	69456
35.29.14	Dasuk	64.50	29,420	30,078	31,467	Kerta Timur	15	69454
35.29.03	Manding	68.88	27,922	29,716	30,781	Manding Laok	11	69452
35.29.17	Batuputih	112.31	42,482	43,551	45,196	Batuputih Laok	14	69453
35.29.19	Gapura	65.78	36,771	37,191	39,117	Gapura Barat	17	69472
35.29.16	Batang Batang	80.36	51,948	54,277	56,127	Batang-Batang Daya	16	69473
35.29.17	Dungkek ^{(b)}	63.36	36,115	35,518	37,027	Dungkek	15	69474
	Sapudi Islands:	(167.41)	(82,024)	(85,284)	(78,154)		(27)	
35.29.21	Nonggunong	40.08	13,194	13,643	13,442	Sokarame Paseser	8	69484
35.29.20	Gayam	88.40	32,303	32,059	31,924	Pancor	10	69483
35.29.22	Raas	38.93	36,527	39,582	32,788	Brakas	9	69485
	Kangean Islands:	(652.53)	(123,367)	(161,056)	(166,226)		(37)	
35.29.25	Sapeken	205.75	43,117	50,325	56,308	Sapeken	9	69493
35.29.24	Arjasa	241.97	59,702	85,048	84,307	Kalikatak	19	69491
35.29.27	Kangayan	204.81	20,548	25,683	25,611	Kangayan	9	69490
	Masalembu Islands:	(40.85)	(21,705)	(25,809)	(25,207)		(4)	
35.29.23	Masalembu	40.85	21,705	25,809	25,207	Suka Jeruk	4	69492

Note: (a) comprising 4 kelurahan (Bangselok, Karangduak, Kepanjin and Pajagalan) and 12 desa.
(b) includes the island of Gili Iyang (also known as Pulau Oksigen) east of Madura, with an area of 9.15 km^{2} and an estimated mid-2024 population of 8,313 people in two desa (Bancamara in the south and Banraas in the north).

The districts are subdivided (as at 2007) into:

- Villages: 328 rural desa and 4 urban kelurahan (all four kelurahan are in Kota Sumenep District)
- Pillars of Citizens (RW): 1,774
- Neighborhoods (RT): 5,569
