= Gili Genteng =

Island in Indonesia

Coordinates: 7°12′S 113°55′E

Gili Genteng (also called Pulau Genteng or Pulau Giliginting) is a pair of islands located to the southeast of Madura Island. Administratively, these islands comprise the Giliginting District, part of Sumenep Regency of East Java Province. Giliginting District consists of two islands, namely Giliginteng Island itself (containing the administrative centre of the District) and Gili Raja Island, which is located to the west of Giliginting Island. Almost all the inhabitants of this island are Madurese people and most of the original people migrated to Cirebon, Jakarta, Serang, and Banten. They mostly opened basic food stores; in Cirebon alone, nearly 500 shops were owned by people from Giliginting, and they established the IKAMA Organization (Ikatan Keluarga Madura - the Madura Family Association) which aims to organise the Giliginting people in Cirebon. Giliginting District was officially formed in 1982, based on GOVERNMENT REGULATION OF THE REPUBLIC OF INDONESIA (PP) NUMBER 7 OF 1982 (7/1982). Giliginting District consists of 8 administrative villages, namely: Aeng Anyar Village, Gedugan Village, Bringsang Village and Galis Village (all on Giliginting Island), and Banbaru Village, Banmaleng Village, Lombang Village and Jate Village (all on Gili Raja Island).
