= Sapudi Islands =

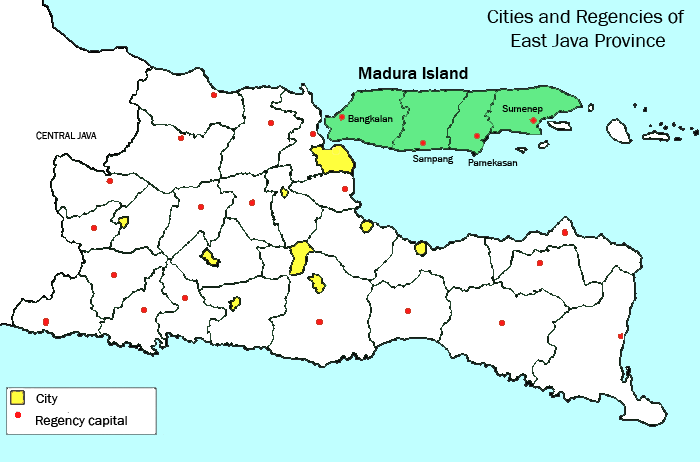
- Sapudi Islands are located to the east of Madura Island
- Interactive map of Sapudi Islands

Geography
- Location: Java Sea
- Coordinates: 7°07′14″S 114°19′59″E
- Area: 167.38 km^{2} (64.63 sq mi)

Administration
- Indonesia
- Province: East Java
- Regency: Sumenep

Demographics
- Population: 77,153 (mid 2022 estimate)
- Pop. density: 460.9/km^{2} (1193.7/sq mi)

Sapudi Islands are a group of 14 islands that lie between Madura Island and the Kangean islands of Indonesia. It is part of the Greater Sunda Islands and is located in the Java Sea. The Sapudi Islands are administered as three kecamatan (districts) of Sumenep Regency in the province of East Java. The land area is 167.38 km^{2}, and there was a population of 82,024 at the 2010 Census and 85,284 at the 2020 Census, but the official estimate for mid 2022 showed a decline to 77,153. The Sapudi dialect of the Madurese language is spoken on the islands.

Nonggunong District includes the northern half of Sapudi Island (Pulau Sapedi) and the small offshore islands of Manok and Payangan. Gayam District includes the southern half of Sapudi Island. Raas District comprises 11 islands further east, of which the main are Raas, Ketupat and Tonduk. The main settlement on Sapudi Island (Nonggunong District) is Sonok, while on Raas Island, the main settlement is at Brakas in the east.
