= Talango Island =

Island in East Java, Indonesia

Coordinates: 7°05′20″S 113°59′40″E

Talango Island is an island lying off the southeast coast of Madura, in East Java, in Indonesia. It forms an administrative district (kecamatan) within Sumenep Regency. It covers an area of 50.27 km^{2}, and had a population of 38,563 according to the official estimates for mid 2021. The inhabitants predominantly speak Madurese.

The island is administratively composed of 8 villages (desa), listed below with their areas and their populations in mid 2021.

- Padike 5.70 km^{2} (5,152)
- Cabbiya 5.41 km^{2} (2,859)
- Essang 5.49 km^{2} (3,514)
- Kombang 6.31 km^{2} (3,316)
- Poteran 6.00 km^{2} (4,415)
- Palasa 8.43 km^{2} (4,728)
- Gapurana 9.28 km^{2} (8,290)
- Talango 3.67 km^{2} (6,289)
