= Great Mosque of Sumenep =

Mosque in Madura, East Java, Indonesia

- Masjid Agung Sumenep
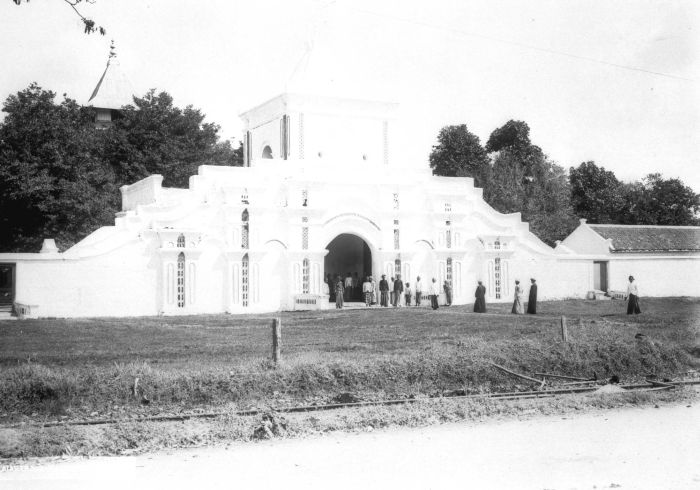
- The main gate of the Great Mosque of Sumenep

Religion
- Affiliation: Islam
- Branch/tradition: Sunni
- Province: East Java
- Region: Madura Island
- Status: Active

Location
- Location: Sumenep, Indonesia
- Interactive map of Great Mosque of Sumenep
- Coordinates: 7.007985°S 113.858763°E

Architecture
- Architect: Lauw Pia Ngo
- Type: Mosque
- Style: eclectic (Javanese Vernacular, Chinese)
- Groundbreaking: 1779
- Completed: 1787

Specifications
- Direction of façade: East
- Capacity: 2,000
- Minaret: 1
- Minaret height: 50 metres (160 ft)

The Great Mosque of Sumenep (Indonesian: Masjid Agung Sumenep) is an 18th-century mosque in Sumenep, Madura. Standing on the alun-alun of Sumenep, it is the largest mosque on Madura Island and a noted landmark of Madura.

== History ==
Previously known as the Panembahan Sumala Jami Mosque after the 31st adipati (duke) of Sumenep who established the mosque, construction of the mosque started in 1779 and was completed in 1787. The mosque was built as part of the Kraton complex in Sumenep.

The Great Mosque of Sumenep is the second mosque of the new kraton complex, replacing the earlier mosque masjid laju (from Madurese which means 'old mosque'), whose construction was initiated by Kanjeng Raden Tumenggung Aria Anggadipa, 21st ruler of Sumenep, and was completed in 1757.

== Architecture ==
The architect of the mosque is Lauw Pia Ngo, one of the early generations of Chinese people who took residence in Madura. He also designed the Sumenep kraton, which was completed earlier in 1764.

The overall impression of the mosque is of eclectic influence, a mixture of Chinese, local Javanese, and western style; typical of the cities on the north of Java. The Great Mosque of Sumenep features a three-tiered roof, a typical style in the mosque architecture of Indonesia. This main roof is topped with a kemuncak decoration, featuring three spheres. This main roof is surrounded by six sets of smaller two-tiered roofs to the south, east, and north of the main prayer hall. A white brick wall enclosed the interior space of the mosque. The tall windows and main door, reminiscent of Dutch colonial architecture style, are painted in bold color instead, a characteristic Chinese style.

The mosque complex is surrounded by iron fence, although in the past this was massive wall instead, completely separating the enclosed inner space of the mosque complex with the outside world. To the southeast and northeast of the perimeter are two small pavilions with rounded cupola, flanking the eastern perimeter of the mosque complex. These small pavilions were used as prisons.

The most distinctive feature of the mosque is its main gateway. It features an eclectic design, mixture of Chinese and Javanese influence. The main gate is topped with a platform on its first floor, this can be accessed via two flight of staircases on the left and right of the main gate. A bedug is hanged in the space above the gateway's portal. This bedug originally belongs to masjid laju.

== See also ==
- List of mosques in Indonesia

== Works cited ==
- "Masjid Laju Kepanjen, Masjid Pertama Kraton Sumenep" [Masjid Laju Kepanjen, The First Mosque of Kraton Sumenep]. Kompasiana (in Indonesian). Kompasiana. June 24, 2015.
- Musthofa Bisri (August 20, 2010). "Beribadah Sambil Melek Sejarah Masjid Agung Sumenep" [Worshiping while being historically aware in the Great Mosque of Sumenep]. Tempo (in Indonesian). Tempo Inti Media. Archived from the original on November 12, 2015.
- Syaf Anton Wr (February 10, 2011). "Masjid Agung Sumenep: Arsitektur Peradaban Bangsa Dunia" [Great Mosque of Sumenep: The Architecture of World Civilization]. Lontar Madura (in Indonesian). Lontar Madura. Archived from the original on November 13, 2015.
- Zein M. Wiryoprawiro (1986). Arsitektur tradisional Madura, Sumenep: dengan pendekatan historis & deskriptif [Traditional Architecture of Madura, Sumenep: historic and descriptive approach] (in Indonesian). Surabaya: Laboratorium Arsitektur Tradisional, FTSP, ITS.
