= Trunojoyo Airport =

Airport in East Java, Indonesia

Trunojoyo Airport Bandar Udara Trunojoyo
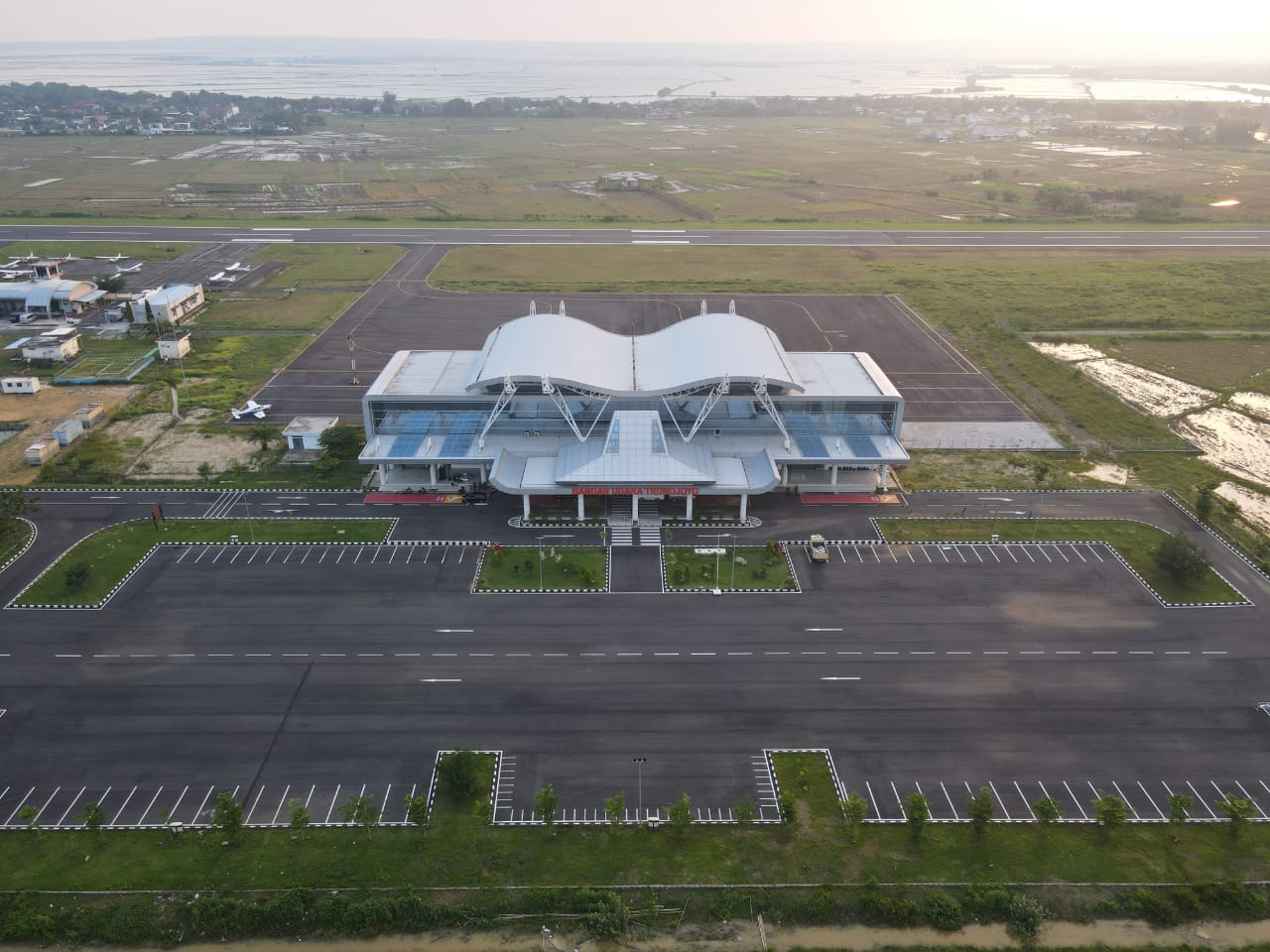
- IATA: SUP; ICAO: WART

Summary
- Airport type: Public
- Owner: Government of Indonesia
- Operator: Directorate General of Civil Aviation
- Serves: Madura Island
- Location: Sumenep, Madura Island, East Java, Indonesia
- Time zone: WIB (UTC+07:00)
- Elevation AMSL: 3.05 m / 10 ft
- Coordinates: 07°01′27.3″S 113°53′24.74″E
- Website: www.bandara-trunojoyo.com

Map
- Location of the Airport in Java

Runways
Direction	Length		Surface
Direction	m	ft	Surface
12/30	1,600	5,249	Asphalt
- Source: Directorate General of Civil Aviation

Trunojoyo Airport (Indonesian: Bandara Trunojoyo) (IATA: SUP, ICAO: WART) is an airport near Sumenep, a city in the Madura Island of East Java, Indonesia. It is named after the Madurese nobleman Trunajaya, who led a rebellion in the 17th century against Mataram Sultanate and Dutch forces. The airport is the only airport on the island of Madura. It currently only serves regional flights to Bawean and Pagerungan in the Sapeken Islands, operated by Susi Air. Previously, there were flights to Surabaya operated by Citilink and Wings Air, but these services were discontinued in 2022 due to low demand. This airport also serves as a base for several flight schools, including Merpati Pilot School, Akademi Penerbang Indonesia Banyuwangi, Nusa Flying International, Aviatera, Global Aviation, and Bali International Flight Academy.

== History ==
Trunojoyo Airport was originally built in 1979. At that time, its runway was only 850 meters long and 23 meters wide. In January 1976, a Merpati Nusantara Airlines aircraft successfully landed at Trunojoyo Airport, marking the first-ever aircraft to land in Madura. Furthermore, in 1979, for the first time in Sumenep’s history, 17 Hajj pilgrims departed from this airport to Juanda International Airport in Surabaya before continuing their journey to Jeddah.

Unfortunately, due to a shortage of aviation personnel and inadequate supporting facilities, the airport was only operational for a brief period. From 1980 to 2010, it remained largely dormant, with minimal activity except for occasional visits by large propeller aircraft carrying government officials. Initially, Trunojoyo Airport was managed by the Sumenep Regency Government. In 2009, it was transferred to the Ministry of Transportation. Since then, Trunojoyo Airport has offered pioneering flight services and training flights. In 2010, the airport began a development project, extending the runway from 850 meters to 1,600 meters and widening it from 23 meters to 30 meters. The expansion was completed in 2016, enabling the airport to accommodate larger aircraft such as the ATR-72. Commercial flights resumed in 2015 after nearly 35 years of inactivity.

To boost capacity, a new, larger terminal was built in 2018 and completed in 2022. The terminal was officially inaugurated by President Joko Widodo on 20 April 2022.

== Facilities ==
The airport features a terminal building covering 3,600 square meters, with a capacity to accommodate 129,000 passengers annually. The airport has a runway measuring 1,600 meters by 30 meters, capable of accommodating aircraft such as the ATR-72.

== Airlines and destinations ==
Airlines	Destinations
Susi Air	Bawean, Pagerungan
