= Madura =

Island in Indonesia

Native name: Polo Madhurâ (Madurese) Nickname: Pulau Garam "Island of Salt"
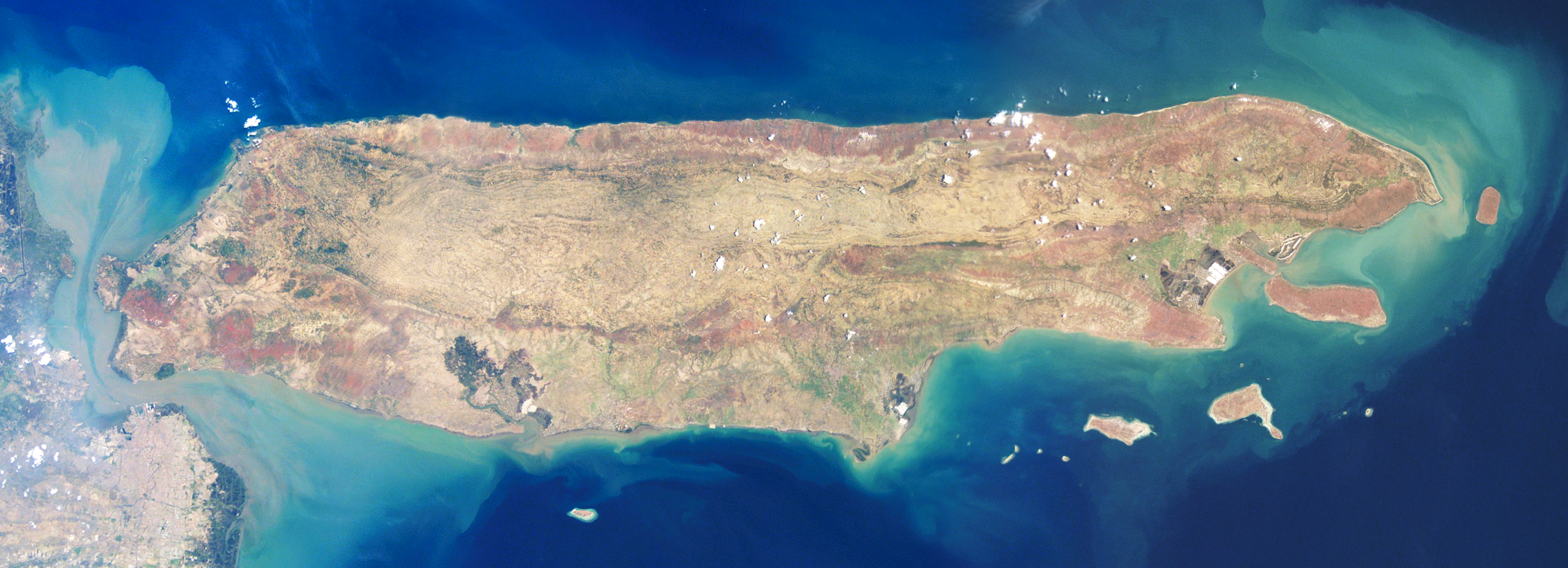
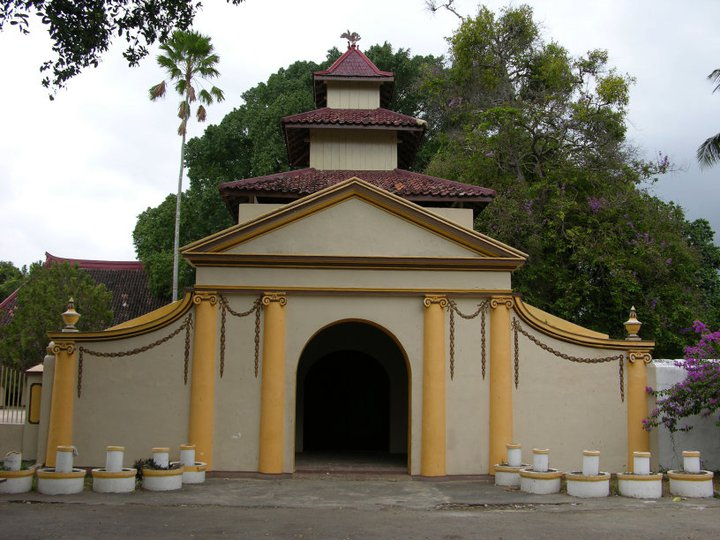
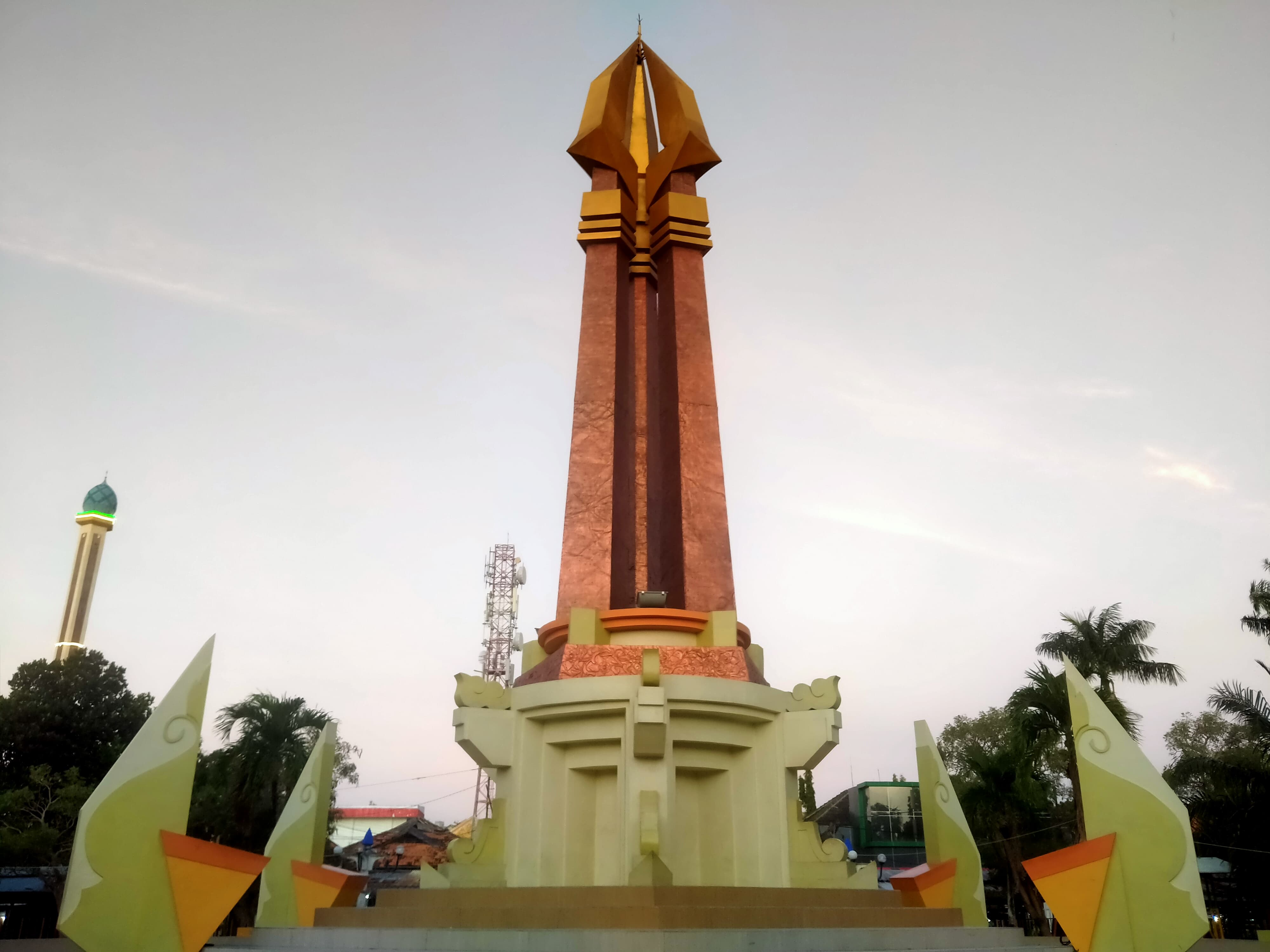
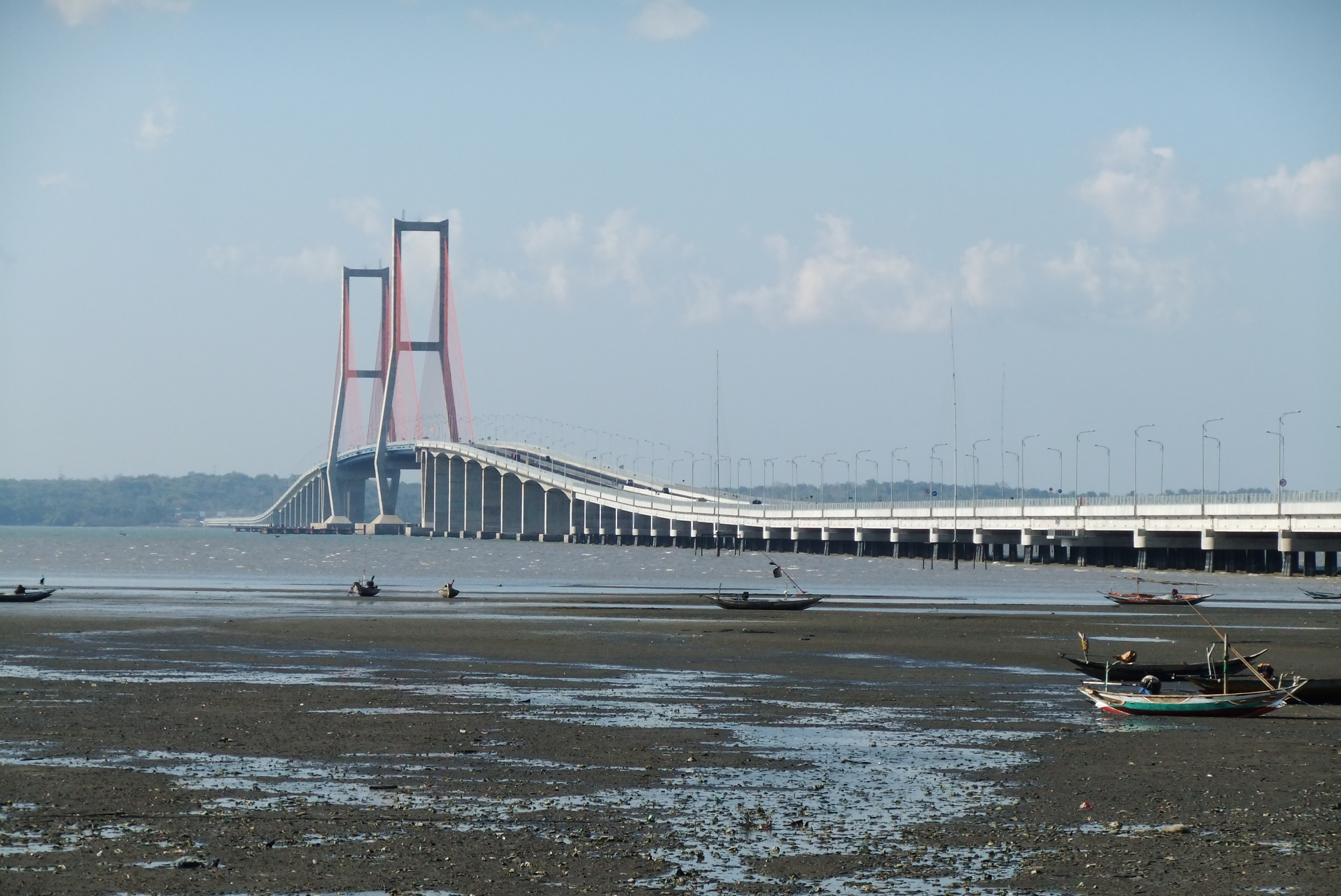
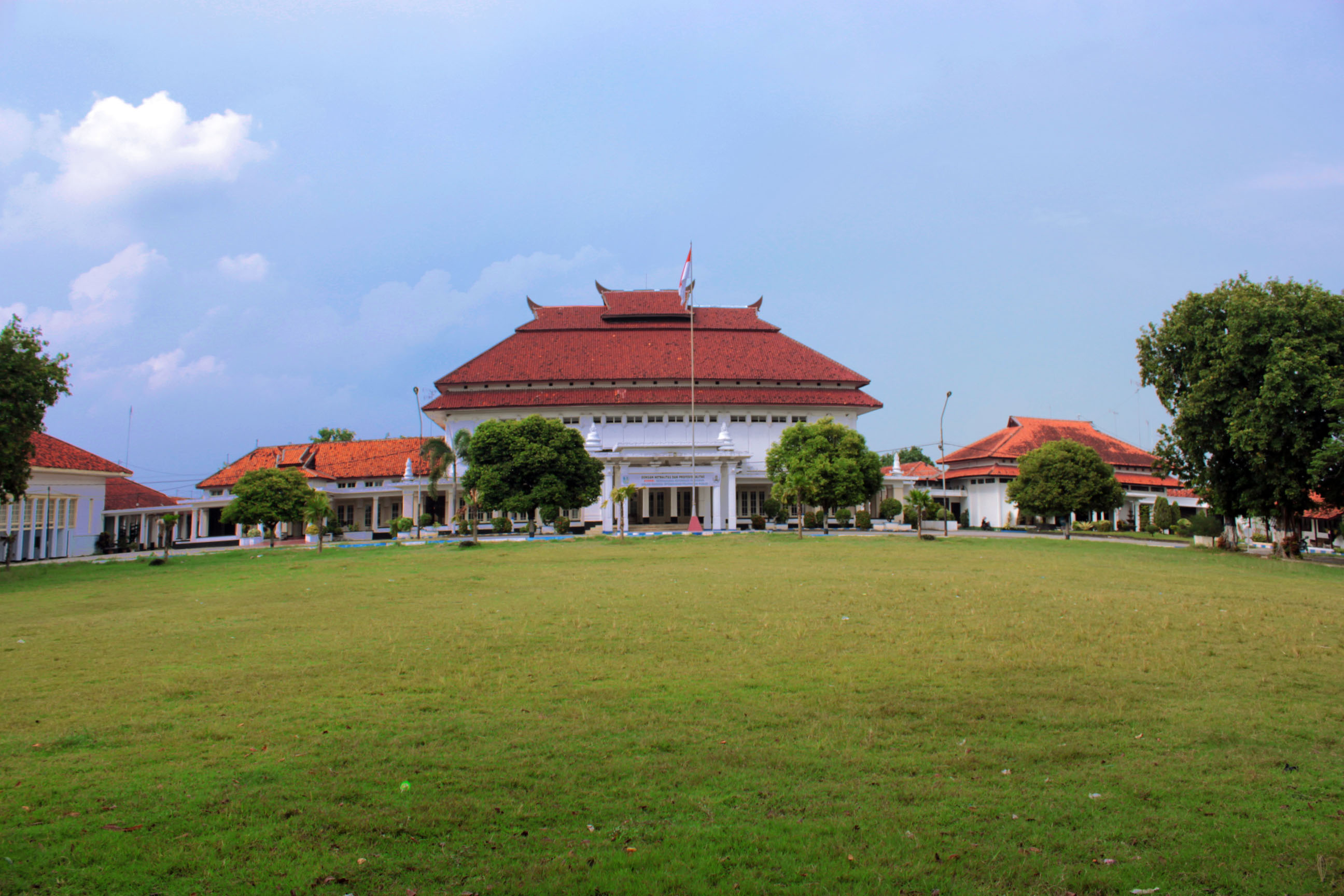
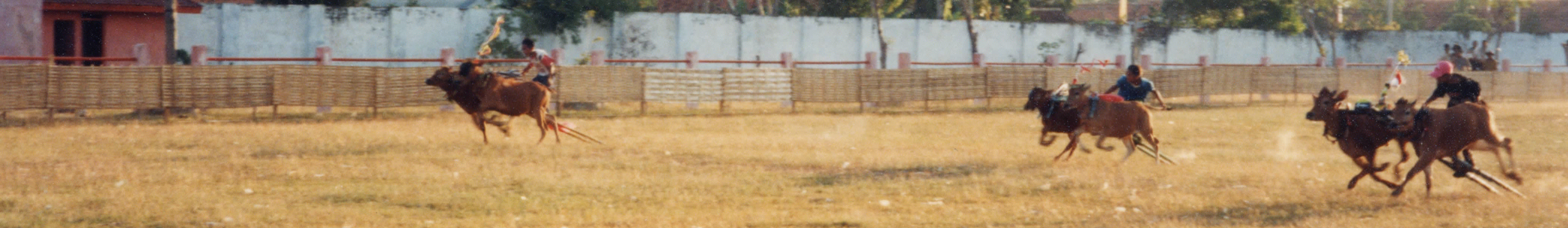
- Satellite image of Madura Island Sumenep Palace Trunojoyo Monument Suramadu Bridge Madura Residency Bull racing (Karapan Sapi) in Madura

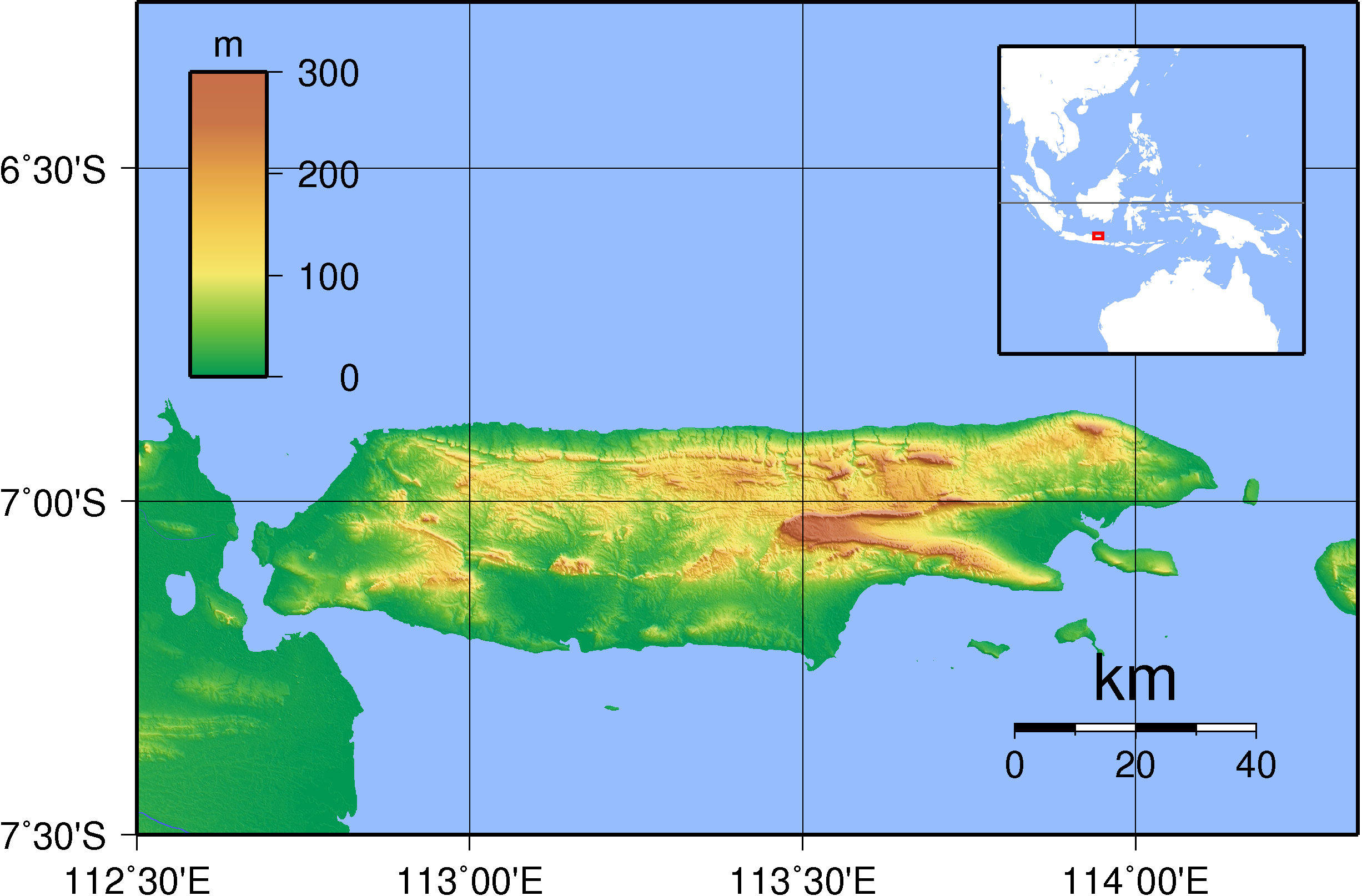
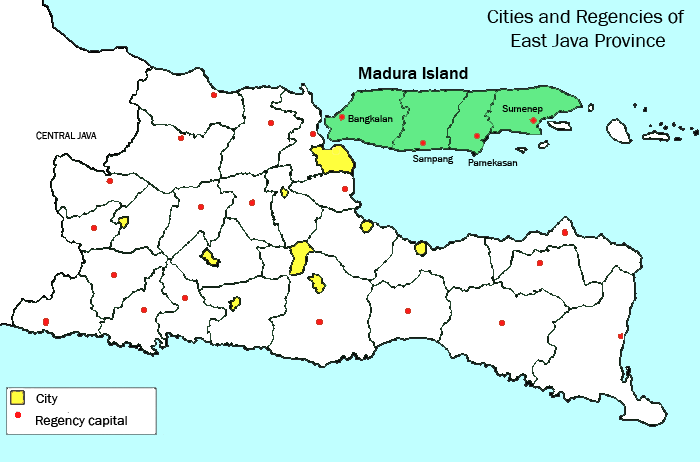
- Topography of Madura Location within East Java

- Location of Madura in Indonesia Location of Madura off Eastern Java

Geography
- Location: Southeast Asia
- Coordinates: 07°03′36″S 113°24′00″E
- Archipelago: Greater Sunda Islands
- Adjacent to: Java Sea (north); Madura Strait (south)
- Area: 5,408.45 km^{2} (2,088.21 sq mi)
- Area rank: 129th
- Length: 180 km (112 mi)
- Width: 40 km (25 mi)
- Highest elevation: 471 m (1545 ft)
- Highest point: Tembuku

Administration
- Indonesia
- Province: East Java
- Regencies: Bangkalan; Sampang; Pamekasan; Sumenep
- Largest town: Sampang

Demographics
- Demonym: Madura Islander
- Population: 4,156,661 (mid 2024 estimate)
- Population rank: 27th
- Pop. density: 773.45/km^{2} (2003.23/sq mi)
- Languages: Indonesian (official); Madurese (regional)
- Ethnic groups: Madurese (majority); Javanese; Chinese; Arabs; others

Additional information
- Time zone: IWST (UTC+7)
- Postal code: 69112 – 69493
- Area code: +62 31 (Bangkalan); +62 323 (Sampang); +62 324 (Pamekasan); +62 328 (Sumenep)
- Vehicle registration: M
- ISO 3166 code: ID-JI

Madura (Note: UK: /məˈdʊərə/ mə-DOOR-ə, US: /ˈmædʒərə/ MAJ-ər-ə; Official language: Indonesian: Pulau Madura; Braille: ⠏⠥⠇⠁⠥⠀⠍⠁⠙⠥⠗⠁; Jawi: ڤولاو مادورا, pronounced [ˈpu.lau̯ maˈdu.ra]; Native regional language: Madurese: Polo Madhurâ; Pèghu: ڤَولَو مادورۤا; Carakan: ꦥꦺꦴꦭꦺꦴꦩꦢꦸꦫ, pronounced [ˈpɔ.lɔ maˈt̪ʰu.rɤ]) is an Indonesian island off the northeastern coast of Java. The island has an area of about 4,471.05 square kilometers (1,726.28 mi^{2}), but administratively Madura comprises an area of around 5,408.45 square kilometers (2,088.21 mi^{2}) due to the inclusion of various smaller islands to the east, southeast and north that are part of Madura's easternmost Sumenep Regency. Madura is part of the province of East Java. It is separated from Java by the narrow Madura Strait. The administered area had a density of 773 people per km^{2} (2,003 per sq. mile) in mid-2024, while the main island had a somewhat higher figure of 862.3 per km^{2} (2,233 per sq. mile).

== Name ==
Madura is named for Madurai, the home of the Hindu deity Azhagar.

Madura is also called in its historical languages:

- Kawi: ᬦᬹᬱᬫᬟᬸᬭ, romanized: Nūṣa Maḍura, pronounced [ˈn̪u.ʂa maˈɖu.ra]
- Sanskrit: मधुरद्वीप, romanized: Madhura-dvīpa, pronounced [mɐ.d̪ʱu.ɾɐ.d̪ʋiː.pɐ]

In its other regional languages:

- Javanese: Pulo Mêdhurå; Pégon: ڤولَو مۤڎورا; Hånåcåråkå: ꦥꦸꦭꦺꦴꦩꦼꦝꦸꦫ, pronounced [ˈpu.lo mǝˈɖu.rɔ]
- Sundanese: Pulo Madureu; Pégon: ڤولَو مادورٓى; Ngalagena: ᮕᮥᮜᮧ ᮙᮓᮥᮛᮩ, pronounced [ˈpu.lo maˈdu.rɤ]
- Balinese: Pulo Mĕdura; Hanacaraka: ᬧᬸᬮᭀᬫᭂᬤᬸᬭ, pronounced [ˈpu.lo mǝˈdu.ra]
- Buginese: Pulo Madure; Lontara’: ᨄᨘᨒᨚᨆᨉᨘᨑᨛ, pronounced [ˈpu.lo maˈdu.rǝ]

== History ==
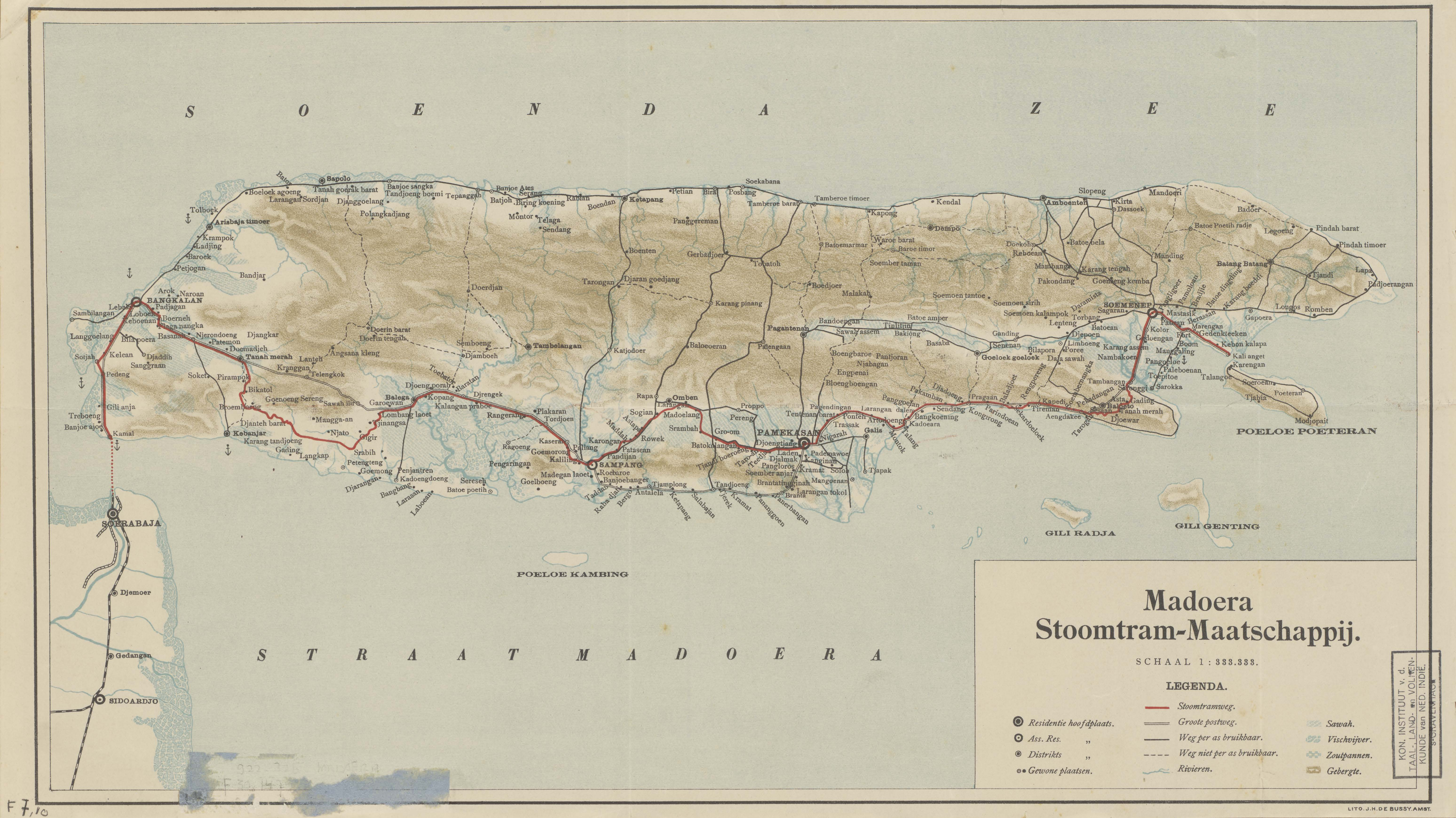
Map of the Madoera Stoomtram Maatschappij, c. 1915

In 1624, Sultan Agung of Mataram conquered Madura, and the island's government was brought under the Cakraningrats, a single princely line. The Cakraningrat family opposed Central Javanese rule and often conquered large parts of Mataram.

Following the First Javanese War of Succession between Amangkurat III and his uncle, Pangeran Puger, the Dutch gained control of the eastern half of Madura in 1705. Dutch recognition of Puger was influenced by the lord of West Madura, Cakraningrat II, who is thought to have supported Puger's claims in the hope that a new war in central Java would provide the Madurese with a chance to interfere. However, while Amangkurat was arrested and exiled to Ceylon, Puger took the title of Pakubuwono I and signed a treaty with the Dutch that granted them East Madura.

The Cakraningrats agreed to help the Dutch quash the 1740 rebellion in Central Java after the Chinese massacre in 1740. In a 1743 treaty with the Dutch, Pakubuwono II ceded the full sovereignty of Madura to the Dutch, which was contested by Cakraningrat IV. Cakraningrat fled to Banjarmasin, took refuge with the British, was robbed and betrayed by the sultan, and captured by the Dutch and exiled to the Cape of Good Hope.

The Dutch continued Madura's administrative divisions of four states each with their own regent. The island was initially important as a source of colonial troops and in the second half of the nineteenth century it became the main source of salt for Dutch-controlled territories in the archipelago. The Dutch gradually sidelined the Sultan and took over direct control of the entire island in the 1880s, governing it as the Madoera Residency. From 1948 to 1950, under the United States of Indonesia, Madura was administered as a federative state known as the State of Madura.

== Geography ==
Madura Island is a relatively flat topography and there is no significant difference in elevation, which makes Madura a badland. Geologically, Madura is part of the northern limestone mountains of Java. The limestone hills in Madura are lower, rougher, and rounder than the hills in northern Java.

== Demography ==
Religion in Madura Island (2023)
1. Islam (99.9%)
2. Protestant (0.06%)
3. Roman Catholic (0.04%)
4. Buddhism, Hinduism, Confucianism, Aliran Kepercayaan and Others (0.01%)

Madura (including its offshore islands) has a population of about four million, most of whom are ethnically Madurese. The main language of Madura is Madurese, one of a family of Austronesian languages, which is also spoken in part of eastern Java and on many of the 66 outlying islands.

The Madurese are a large ethnic population in Indonesia, numbering around seven million inhabitants. They come from the island of Madura as well as surrounding islands, such as Giliraja, Sapudi, Raas, and the Kangean Islands. Additionally, many Madurese live in the eastern part of East Java, commonly called the "Horseshoe", from Pasuruan to the north of Banyuwangi. Madurese are found in Situbondo and Bondowoso, and east of Probolinggo, Jember, and a few at most who speak Javanese, including North Surabaya, as well as some of Malang.

Madura has a Sunni Muslim majority and a large Shia minority. However, since 2012, interfaith discord has escalated to violence, resulting in many Shia villages around the city of Sampang being attacked and many residents escaping to government refugee centers. The United Nations Office for the Coordination of Humanitarian Affairs has provided details of such attacks in 2013.

== Administrative divisions ==
Madura Island is administered as part of East Java Province, and is divided into the following four regencies, listed from west to east:

Name	Capital	Area (km^{2})	Pop'n 2000 census	Pop'n 2010 census	Pop'n 2020 census	Pop'n mid 2024 estimate
Bangkalan Regency	Bangkalan	1,260.15	805,048	906,761	1,060,377	1,102,522
Sampang Regency	Sampang	1,228.25	750,046	877,772	969,694	1,016,254
Pamekasan Regency	Pamekasan	792.30	689,225	795,918	850,057	884,697
Sumenep Regency	Sumenep	2,093.47	985,981	1,042,312	1,124,436	1,153,188
Totals		5,374.17	3,230,300	3,622,763	4,004,564	4,156,661

Note: Sumenep Regency, besides including the eastern quarter of Madura Island, also includes many offshore islands - notably the Kangean Islands to the east of Madura, the smaller Sapudi Islands lying between Madura and the Kangean Islands, and Talango Island closer to Madura; it also includes the small Masalembu Islands to the north (between Madura and Kalimantan) and the Giligenteng Islands to the southeast of Madura. The mainland (i.e. the area on Madura Island itself) covers 1,156.07 km^{2} (with 812,117 inhabitants in mid 2024) consisting of 18 districts, while the various islands are 937.40 km^{2} in area (with 330,885 people in mid 2024), comprising 9 districts, with 128 islands, 46 inhabited.

== Economy ==
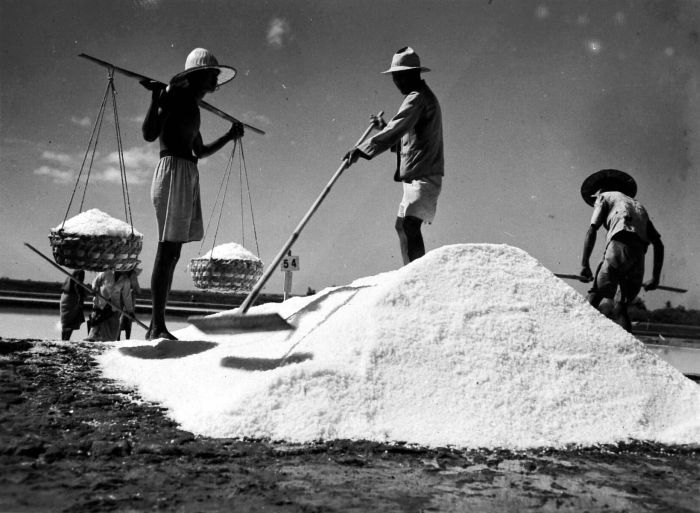
Salt making in Madura in 1948

On the whole, Madura is one of the poorest regions of the East Java province. Unlike Java, the soil is not fertile enough to make it a major agricultural producer. Limited economic opportunities have led to chronic unemployment and poverty. These factors have led to long-term emigration from the island, such that most ethnically Madurese people now do not live on Madura. People from Madura were some of the most numerous participants in government transmigration programs, moving to other parts of Indonesia.

Subsistence agriculture is a mainstay of the economy. Maize is a key subsistence crop, on the island's many small landholdings. Cattle-raising is also a critical part of the agricultural economy, providing extra income to peasant farmer families, in addition to being the basis for Madura's famous bull-racing competitions. Small-scale fishing is also important to the subsistence economy.

Among export industries, tobacco farming is a major contributor to the island's economy. Madura's soil, while unable to support many food crops, helps make the island an important producer of tobacco and cloves for the domestic kretek (clove cigarette) industry. Since the Dutch era, the island has also been a major producer and exporter of salt.

Bangkalan, on the western end of the island, has industrialized substantially since the 1980s. This region is within a short ferry ride of Surabaya, Indonesia's second-largest city, and hence has gained a role as a suburb for commuters to Surabaya, and as a location for industry and services that need to be near the city.

The Surabaya-Madura (Suramadu) Bridge, opened in 2009, is expected to further increase the Bangkalan area's interaction with the regional economy.

=== Climate ===
Almost all parts of Madura are lowlands and closer to equator, which make the island is warmer and drier than the mainland of East Java.

Climate data for Pamekasan, East Java, Indonesia (elevation 15 meters or 49 feet)
Month	Jan	Feb	Mar	Apr	May	Jun	Jul	Aug	Sep	Oct	Nov	Dec	Year
Mean daily maximum °C (°F)	31 (88)	30.8 (87.4)	31 (88)	31.5 (88.7)	31.7 (89.1)	31.4 (88.5)	31.1 (88.0)	31.6 (88.9)	32.3 (90.1)	33 (91)	33 (91)	31.6 (88.9)	31.7 (89.0)
Daily mean °C (°F)	26.7 (80.1)	26.5 (79.7)	26.6 (79.9)	27 (81)	27.1 (80.8)	26.5 (79.7)	26 (79)	26.3 (79.3)	26.9 (80.4)	27.7 (81.9)	28 (82)	27 (81)	26.9 (80.4)
Mean daily minimum °C (°F)	22.4 (72.3)	22.3 (72.1)	22.3 (72.1)	22.6 (72.7)	22.5 (72.5)	21.7 (71.1)	21 (70)	21.1 (70.0)	21.6 (70.9)	22.5 (72.5)	23 (73)	22.5 (72.5)	22.1 (71.8)
Average precipitation mm (inches)	260 (10.2)	239 (9.4)	254 (10.0)	179 (7.0)	107 (4.2)	72 (2.8)	41 (1.6)	11 (0.4)	11 (0.4)	38 (1.5)	122 (4.8)	239 (9.4)	1,573 (61.7)
Average relative humidity (%)	82.9	83.5	84.2	80.8	80.1	77.5	74.9	72.8	72.2	72.1	75.6	81.2	78.2
Source 1: Climate-Data.org (temp & precip)
Source 2: Weatherbase (humidity)

According to Köppen-Geiger climate classification, the climate of coastal Madura is tropical savannah (Aw).

Climate data for Payudan Nangger, Sumenep, East Java (elevation 337 meters or 1,106 feet)
Month	Jan	Feb	Mar	Apr	May	Jun	Jul	Aug	Sep	Oct	Nov	Dec	Year
Mean daily maximum °C (°F)	28.7 (83.7)	28.7 (83.7)	29 (84)	29.7 (85.5)	29.7 (85.5)	29.4 (84.9)	29 (84)	29.5 (85.1)	30.3 (86.5)	31 (88)	30.8 (87.4)	29.4 (84.9)	29.6 (85.3)
Daily mean °C (°F)	24.5 (76.1)	24.5 (76.1)	24.8 (76.6)	25.3 (77.5)	25.2 (77.4)	24.8 (76.6)	24.3 (75.7)	24.6 (76.3)	25.2 (77.4)	26 (79)	26 (79)	25 (77)	25.0 (77.1)
Mean daily minimum °C (°F)	20.4 (68.7)	20.4 (68.7)	20.6 (69.1)	20.9 (69.6)	20.8 (69.4)	20.3 (68.5)	19.7 (67.5)	19.7 (67.5)	20.2 (68.4)	21 (70)	21.2 (70.2)	20.7 (69.3)	20.5 (68.9)
Average precipitation mm (inches)	331 (13.0)	288 (11.3)	294 (11.6)	219 (8.6)	116 (4.6)	66 (2.6)	39 (1.5)	17 (0.7)	11 (0.4)	63 (2.5)	172 (6.8)	272 (10.7)	1,888 (74.3)
Source: Climate-Data.org (temp & precip)

According to Köppen-Geiger climate classification, the climate of inland Madura is tropical savannah (Aw).

== Culture ==
=== Bull racing ===
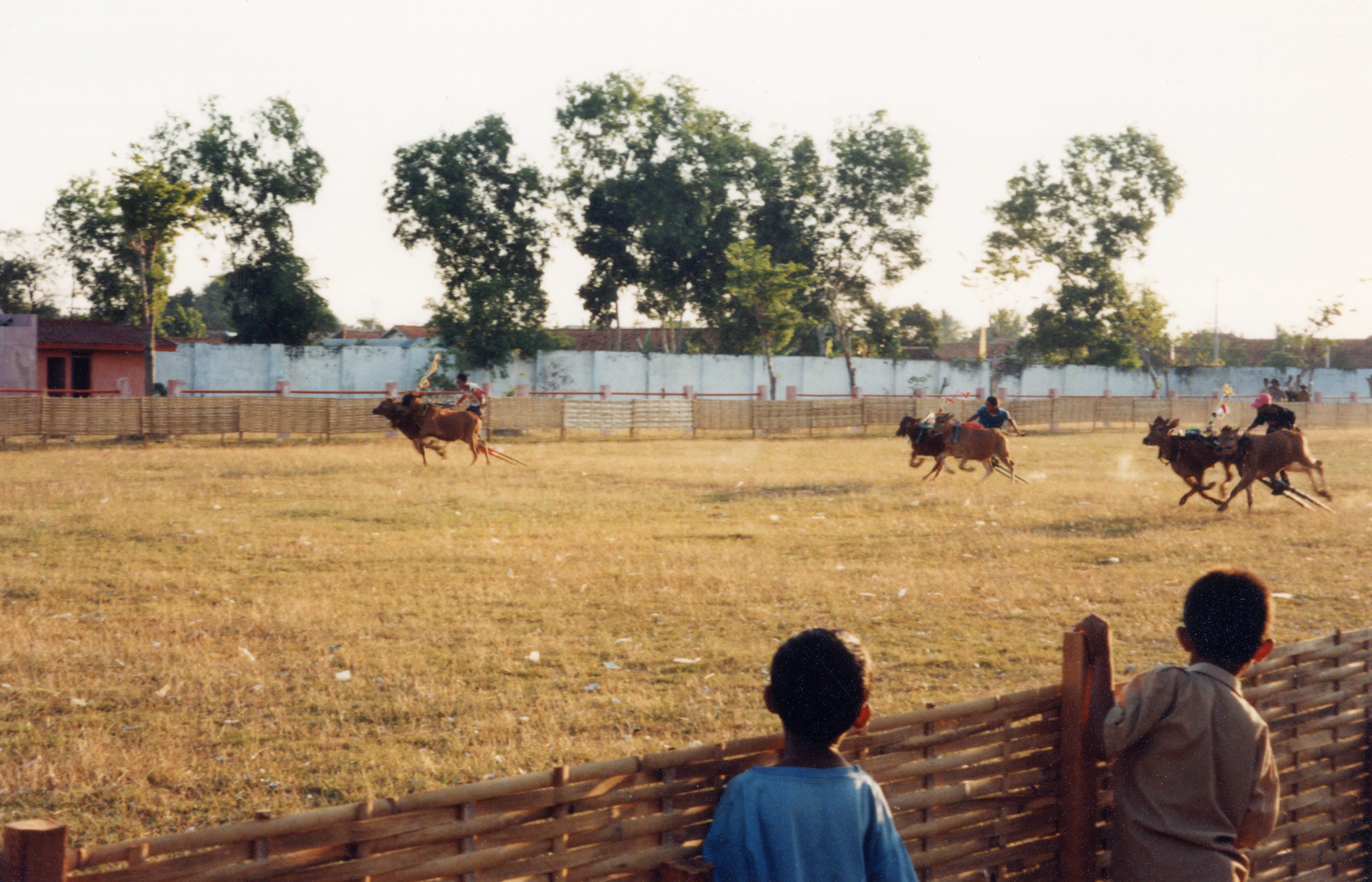
Bull racing in Sumenep, Madura

Madura is famous for its bull-racing competition (called karapan sapi), where a jockey, usually a young boy, rides a simple wooden sled pulled by a pair of bulls over a course of about 100 meters in ten to fifteen seconds.

=== Music and theater ===
Several forms of music and theater are popular on Madura, particularly among lower-class people for whom they provide an inexpensive form of entertainment and community-building. The topeng theater, which involves masked performances of classic stories such as the Ramayana and Mahabharata, is the Madurese performance art best known outside the island, due to its role as a representative Madurese art form at exhibitions of regional cultures from all over Indonesia. However, performances of it are rare on Madura and are generally restricted to entertainment at large official functions. The less formal loddrok theater, where performers do not wear masks and perform a wider range of themes, is more popular on the island.

The gamelan orchestra, best known as a classical Javanese instrument, is also played on Madura, where several of the former royal courts, such as at Bangkalan and Sumenep, possess elaborate gamelans. Tongtong music, more exclusive to Madura, is played on several wooden or bamboo drums, and often accompanies bull-racing competitions.

=== Vessels ===
The Madurese are considered to be excellent sailors. Madurese vessels loaded with cargoes of wood from other islands, like Borneo, used to ply their trade between Indonesia and Singapore. Traditional vessels of Madura include the golekan, leti leti (or leteh-leteh), lis-alis, and janggolan.
