= East Java Christian Church =

Protestant church in Indonesia

East Java Christian Church Gereja Kristen Jawi Wetan
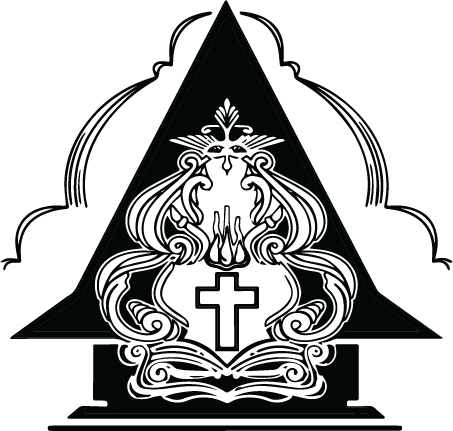
- Logo
- Abbreviation: GKJW
- Classification: Christianity
- Orientation: Protestantism
- Scripture: Bible
- Theology: Calvinism
- Polity: Presbyterian polity
- Leader: Pdt. Nathael Hermawan, S.Si, MBA
- Associations: Communion of Churches in Indonesia (PGI); World Communion of Reformed Churches (WCRC); Christian Conference of Asia (CCA); World Council of Churches (WCC); Consultative of Javanese Churches (BMGJ)
- Region: East Java, Indonesia
- Language: Indonesian; Javanese; Madurese; Bawean; Kangean; Bajau
- Liturgy: GKJW Liturgy
- Headquarters: Shodanco Supriadi 18, Malang, East Java 65147
- Origin: 11 December 1931; 94 years ago Mojowarno, Jombang Regency, East Java
- Congregations: 181 Congregations in 15 Regional Assemblies (as of September 2024)
- Members: +150.000
- Ministers: +200 Pastor
- Hospitals: Mojowarno Christian Hospital; Reksa Waluya Hospital Mojokerto; Mardi Waloeja Women and Children Hospital Kauman Malang; Mardi Waloeja Surgical Hospital Rampal Malang; Marsudi Waluyo Hospital Malang; Griya Waluya Hospital
- Primary schools: SD YBPK GKJW (Christian Education Foundation)
- Secondary schools: SMP YBPK GKJW; SMA YBPK GKJW
- Official website: https://gkjw.or.id/
- Slogan: Patunggilan Kang Nyawiji

The East Java Christian Church (Greja Kristen Jawi Wetan (GKJW) in the Javanese language) is a congregation of Christian and Reformed churches based on Indonesian Javanese ethnicity, located in Java, Indonesia. This church is a member of the Communion of Churches in Indonesia (PGI), World Communion of Reformed Churches (WCRC), Christian Conference of Asia (CCA), World Council of Churches (WCC), and Consultative of Javanese Churches (BMGJ)

== History ==
There were two missionary fellowships active in East Java, the Nederlandsch Zendeling Genootschap (NZG) and the Java Committee. A decree from the NZG head office was signed by the Consul General T. Boetzelaer van Dubbeldam on 15 October 1931. This decree offered the formation of a united church for East Java as a missionary strategy.

The General Assembly was an equivalent of a synod offered by the Dutch missionary fellowship, which for over 100 years, oversaw the Javanese Christian congregation. This formation was the suggestion of Dr Hendrik Kraemer, delegate of Nederlands Hervormde Kerk (NHK), which worked for the NZG. His idea was to form a Christian congregation based on the Dutch East Indies territory as both a cultural and political movement. The Majelis Agung (MA) was then registered at the East Indies Assembly as a legal entity, which gave it authority to manage assets and act as an organization acknowledged by the government.

GKJW was established on 11 December 1931 in one of the oldest Javanese Christian congregations at the time, Mojowarno. A General Assembly (Majelis Agung) united the 29 ecclesiastical courts (Majelis Jemaat, in Indonesian or Raad Pasamuwan Alit, in Javanese dialect) in East Java. The church was under was socio-political pressure from growing Indonesian nationalism, alongside anti-Christian pressure in the country.

Its initial session convened 12 December 1931 at the Mojowarno congregation's church. The Javanese Christian delegates were senior activists of Javanese Christian congregation movements. They promoted GKJW independence through organizations such as Rencono Budiyo (founded in 1898), Mardi Pracoyo (1912), Perserikatan Kaum Kristen (1918), and Panitia Pitoyo (1924).

Prior to the session, a teacher from Mojowarno named Soetikno presented a home-made wooden gavel. On it is written in Javanese manjalmaning resi wadaning Kristus (the year of that session, 1931). Since then GKJW has made use of this gavel at every MA session a tradition. The initial session's theme was Philippians 4:4-9, with emphasis on verse 6 which reads, "Do not be anxious about anything, but in everything, by prayer and petition, with thanksgiving, present your requests to God".

The session was led by Dr. C.W. Nortier as the first MA Head. Raden Poeger was voted secretary, and Poertjojo Gadroen was voted treasurer.

== GKJW during the Japanese occupation ==
During the Japanese occupation of the Dutch East Indies (1942-1945), GKJW was under scrutiny because they were interpreted as Javanese people with Dutch affiliations.

Several Javanese Christians found it difficult to practice their beliefs, and after the torture of a number of Chinese and Christians at the Besuki Residence, support grew to find refuge within the Japanese government in Indonesia.

For this purpose, Raad Pasamuwan Kristen (RPK) was founded in 1943 in East Java. This led to a rift, because both RPK and GKJW had followers.

Many Javanese Christian figures were arrested at the end of World War II, including Rev. Driyo Mestoko, Rev. Tasdik, DR. B.M. Schuurman, and Yeruboham Mattheus. Because of this both RPK and GKJW were left without leadership until Japan surrendered on 14 August 1945. Reconciliation was achieved through an MA session at Mojowarno on 4–6 August 1946.

This reconciliation was symbolized in a communion service on 5 August 1946, which is now recognized as Hari Pembangunan GKJW (GKJW Awakening Day).

== Recent activities ==
At present, GKJW has around 153,000 members, divided into 181 congregations across East Java. These congregations are coordinated under Regional Assemblies (Majelis Daerah), under the GKJW MA. The GKJW organizational structure is a co-ordination system. Member of the World Communion of Reformed Churches.

== GKJW doctrine ==
GKJW believes in God and in the Holy Trinity of Father, Son and Holy Spirit. GKJW believes the Bible as the word of God, consisting of the Old and New Testament, and that the Bible is a witness of His work. GKJW accepts the Credo as a form of faith.

== Ecumenical relations ==
GKJW is a member of and active participant of Communion of Churches in Indonesia.
