= Gedung Setan =

Historic building in Surabaya, Indonesia

Devil's House
- Gedung Setan
- Location within Surabaya

General information
- Location: Banyu Urip Wetan I A No.107, RT.001/RW.06, Banyu Urip, Kec. Sawahan, Kota Surabaya, Jawa Timur 60254, Surabaya, Indonesia
- Coordinates: 7.2758°S 112.7266°E
- Construction started: 1809
- Completed: 1815
- Opened: 1945
- Owner: Teng Khoen Gwan

Technical details
- Floor count: 5

Design and construction
- Architect: J.A. Middelkoop

Gedung Setan (also known as Spookhius) is a heritage building that provided Chinese families with a place of safety during Indonesian mass killings of Communists in 1965 and 1966. This building played an important role in the lives of many Chinese descendants (Tionghoa) in Surabaya.

== History ==
The Devil's House was built in 1809, instituted by the Dutch East India Company. This building was a governor office for Vereenigde Oostindische Compagnie (VOC).

A Chinese doctor and businessman bought the building in 1945 with the intention of opening a Chinese funeral home.

In 1948, The Indonesian National Armed Forces battled the Communist Party of Indonesia, which threatened Chinese families at that time. They decided to transform this building into a refugee shelter for the Chinese in Madiun.

After the 30 September Movement, as Suharto led the New Order, Chinese-Indonesians were suspected of allying themselves with the Chinese Communist Party. Another generation of immigrants found shelter at the Devil's House. The majority of Chinese Surabayans were supporters of Sukarno, complicating the situation, as some were captured as targets.

The name of the building, Gedung Setan (Devil's House), was generated by the people due to the poor situation that made the Chinese become isolated from education and the Chinese language itself. They were smuggled in the darkness, veiled from the regimes they sought a haven from.

In the twenty-first century the majority of residents are of Chinese descent. Marriage between Tionghoa, Madurese, Javanese, and several other ethnic groups enabled this trend. Around 53 Chinese-Indonesians families live in Gedung Setan. They want to protect the building as desired by building owner Dr. Teng Khoen Gwan. The building sits in what evolved to become a desirable market. Many unsuccessfully attempted to claim ownership with the intention of changing it into a marketplace.

== Architecture ==
Most of the buildings built by Dutch architects had thick walls, explaining Gedung Setan's wall thickness of almost 50 centimetres (20 in). Several floors have chambers used for offices. Forty chambers are used as residences. Each room covers around 18 m^{2} (190 sq ft).

The blueprint for this building cannot be found. Lack of resources about this building both from Indonesian and Dutch government restrains further research about the architecture of this building.

== Culture ==
The building is available for public use of residents. Chinese New Year is celebrated by the residents who decorate the hallways and their flats. Church members visit this building to do charity and thanksgiving events.

== Gallery ==
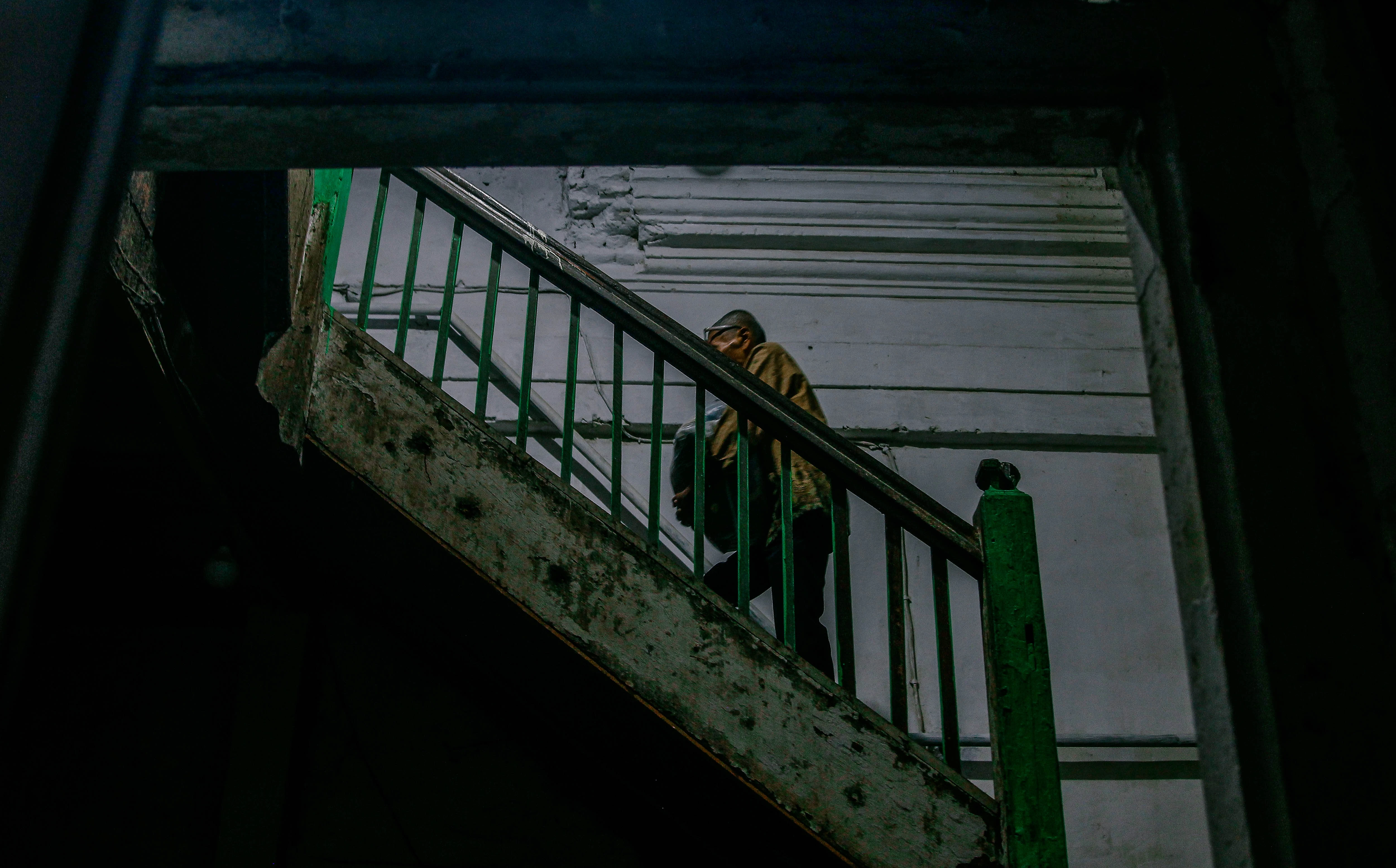
Daily activity of a resident

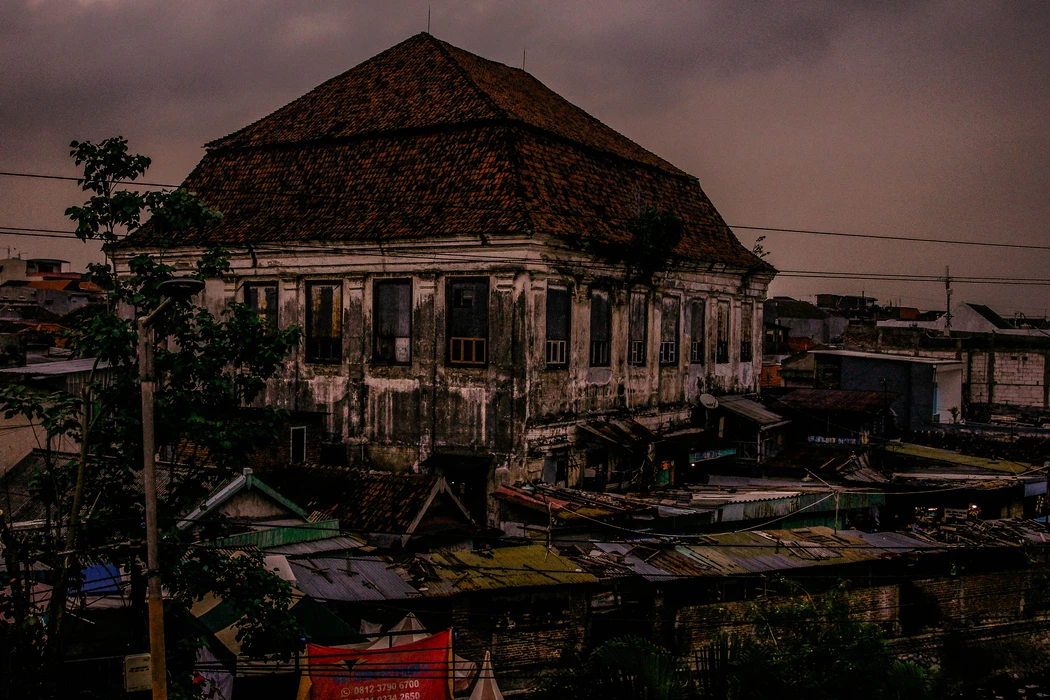
The outer appearance of Devil's House

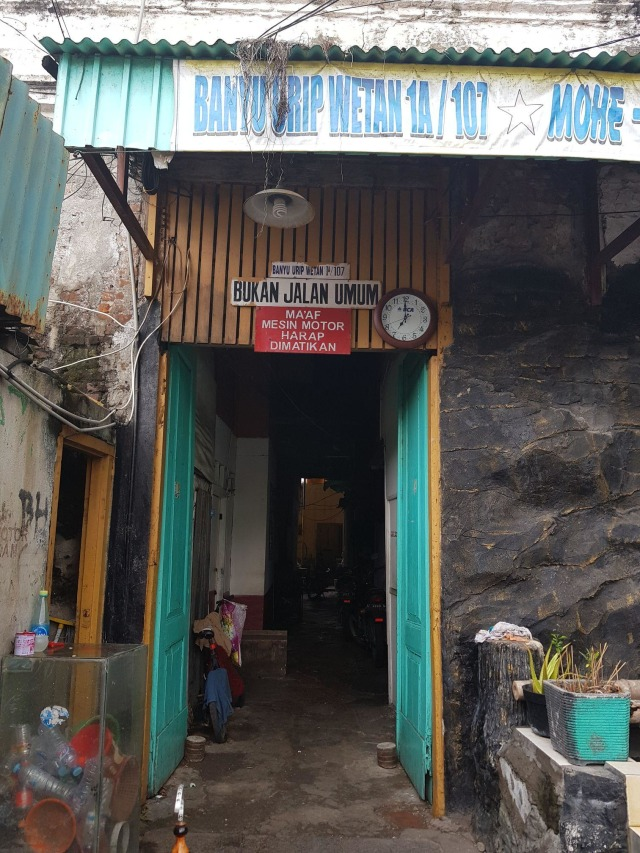
Public entry way
