= Masalembu Island =

Island in East Java, Indonesia

Masalembu
- Interactive map of Masalembu

Geography
- Location: Java Sea
- Coordinates: 5°33′38″S 114°25′23″E
- Area: 23.86 km^{2} (9.21 sq mi)
- Highest elevation: 12 m (39 ft)

Administration
- Indonesia
- Province: East Java
- Regency: Sumenep
- District: Masalembu

Demographics
- Population: 18,485 (2015)
- Pop. density: 774.7/km^{2} (2006.5/sq mi)
- Ethnic groups: Madurese, Buginese, Banjarese

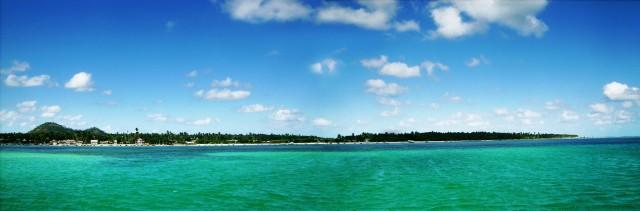
Panorama of the island

Masalembu is an island located in the Java Sea and is the largest island in the Masalembu Islands. It is administered by the Masalembu District of the Sumenep Regency which is centered on the island of Madura and is made up of two administrative villages of Sukajeruk and Massalima.

== Geography ==
The island measures about 7 km west-east and 6 km north-south, with a total land area of 23.86 square kilometers. It is located halfway between Borneo and the island of Madura, with a distance of about 150 km from either. It is largely flat, with the highest elevation reaching 12 meters above sea level.

The interior of the island has largely been taken over by local agriculture. The island has no natural surface freshwater sources and is reliant on groundwater.

== Demographics ==
18,485 individuals (Statistics Indonesia, 2015 estimate) live on the island in 9,158 households, and the population has a sex ratio of 98.19. Administratively, the locals live in two villages of Massalima (pop. 10,325) and Sukajeruk (pop. 8,160), although the main settlement on the island lies across the two's administrative boundaries.

== Economy ==
Fisheries employ a workforce of about 3,100 and agriculture employs about 1,800. Coconuts and corn are the primary crops taking up most of the island's land, with an assortment of vegetables being cultivated as well. Electricity on the island is supplied by diesel generators. 290 families are classified as poor families (i.e. incapable of fulfilling basic needs).

== Facilities ==
State-funded public schools and madrasas are present on the island, providing elementary and high school level education (SD, SMP, and SMA). The only puskesmas of the subdistrict is also located on the island.

The island is mainly accessible by boat and ship, requiring a 12-hour trip from Sumenep. Boats also provide transportation to other islands in the subdistrict such as Karamian and Masakambing. A government-subsidized pioneer ship service carries passengers and various goods in and out of the island, although service interruptions happen occasionally.

An airfield is currently under the process of construction on the southern part of the island, with plans for routine service to and from Trunojoyo Airport in Sumenep.
