= Celurit =

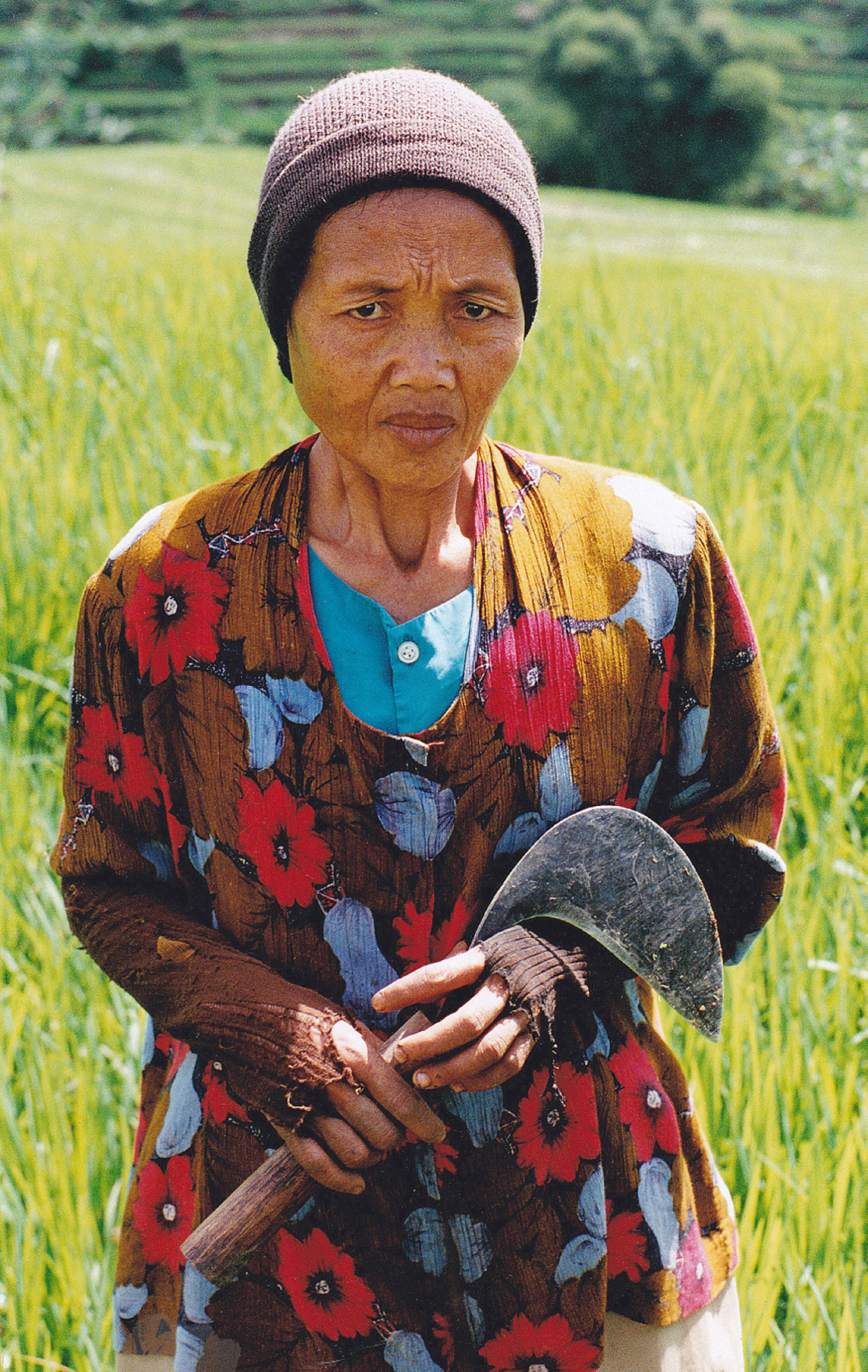
- An old woman in Indonesia holding type of Celurit called Arit or Sabit.
- Type: Sickle, Billhook
- Place of origin: Indonesia (Madura Island)

Service history
- Used by: Madurese

Specifications
- Blade type: Single crescent edge
- Hilt type: Wooden
- Scabbard/sheath: Leather or without sheath

A celurit or clurit is generally a sickle (sometimes other variants include the billhook) with a pronounced crescent-blade patterns which curves more than half a circle and a long handle, is widely used for agricultural purposes and also in Pencak Silat. When compared to the arit, the celurit is slightly larger.

== Use ==
Although the celurit (or also generally known as a sabit) is widely used throughout the Indonesian archipelago for agricultural purposes, somehow it is strongly associated with the culture of the Madurese and is frequently used by them as well especially by the leaders who called themselves Sakera. It is possibly used as an agricultural tool in the Banyuwangi region on East Java and then conveyed to Madura.

Besides the arit and sabit, other variations of the celurit includes the arek, caluk, calok, bendo arit (billhook), bhiris and so on depending on the geographical area and curvature of the crescent blade.

== Culture ==
The celurit is also a traditional weapon of the Madurese commonly used in carok (meaning duel in Madurese language, 'fight in the name of honor'), a style of dueling unlike of those dueling style practiced in their neighbouring island in Sulawesi. This weapon is also considered as a legendary weapon often associated with the heroic (pre-independence) freedom fighter, Sakera. The Madurese community are known to attach khodam, a type of mythical creature to abide in the celurit by a way of prayer before engaging in a carok. The most famous incident in recent years, a mass carok occurred on 13 July 2006 in Bujur Tengah village, Pamekasan Regency, East Java, Indonesia, resulting stabbing and killing of seven men and seriously injuring nine people.

== See also ==
- Kama
- Khopesh
- Kusarigama
- Panabas
- Shotel
- Sickle
- Clurit-class fast attack craft
