= Masalembu Islands =

Archipelago in East Java, Indonesia

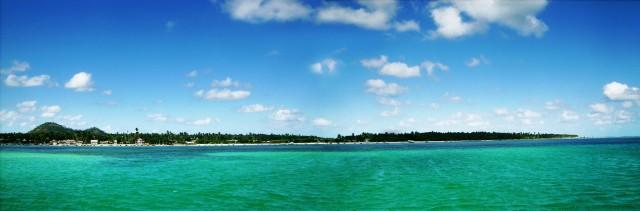
- Masalembu Island

Geography
- Coordinates: 5°4′17″S 114°35′56″E
- Area: 40.85 km^{2} (15.77 sq mi)

Administration
- Indonesia
- Province: East Java
- Regency: Sumenep
- Subdistrict: Masalembu

Demographics
- Population: 25,809 (2020)

The Masalembu Islands (Indonesian: Kepulauan Masalembu) form a small archipelago in the Java Sea to the north of Madura in Indonesia. It is located about halfway between Madura and Borneo, and forms part of the Masalembu district in the Sumenep Regency of East Java. The archipelago consists of three main islands–Masalembu, Masakambing, and Karamian.

The islands are characterized by low sandy terrain with limited freshwater, tropical climate, and notable biodiversity. The economy is reliant on fishing, local agriculture, and tourism. The population consisted of about 25,809 individuals in 2020, from an ethnically diverse background.

== Geography ==
Masalembu is a small archipelago in the Java Sea located about halfway between Madura and Borneo. It forms part of the Masalembu district in the Sumenep Regency of East Java. The archipelago consists of three main islands–Masalembu, Masakambing, and Karamian.

The islands cover an area of 40.85 km^{2} (15.77 sq mi), and consists of plains characterized by coastal lowlands, and central flat areas. The climate is largely tropical and the vegetation consists of natural vegetation interspersed with patches of agricultural lands. Various vegetation zones exists including rainforests, arid scrublands, and coastal mangroves contributing to a complex ecosystem. The soils are sandy, with no major lakes or rivers contributing to freshwater. The islands are biodiversity hotspots supporting varies species of flora and fauna.

== Demographics ==
The population consisted of about 21,705 individuals in 2010, which increased to 25,809 in 2020 and consisted of an ethnically diverse background. Nearly 79% of the population resided in urban settlements. The local inhabitants in the islands include the Maduras and Bugis people.

== Economy ==
The economy is reliant on fishing, local agriculture, and tourism. Agriculture include cultivation of coconuts, corn, cassava, and vegetables. Livestock, small trade, and eco-tourism also contribute to the economy. The islands can be accessed by ferry from Sumenep, while small boats facilitate inter-island connectivity among the three islands. The region is bio-diverse with various species including the endangered Abbotti’s cockatoo.
