= Karamian Island =

Island in East Java, Indonesia

Karamian

Geography
- Coordinates: 5°4′17″S 114°35′56″E
- Area: 10.14 km^{2} (3.92 sq mi)
- Highest elevation: 7 m (23 ft)

Administration
- Indonesia
- Province: East Java
- Regency: Sumenep
- Subdistrict: Masalembu
- Village: Karamian

Demographics
- Population: 3,986 (2015)
- Pop. density: 370.3/km^{2} (959.1/sq mi)

Karamian is a small Indonesian island in the Java Sea. It is administratively part of Masalembu Islands in the Sumenep Regency of East Java. Located over 200 km (120 mi) from the regency capital Kota Sumenep, it housed roughly 3,986 residents in 2015. The population included primarily Madurese and Bugis, practicing Islam. The economy revolves around fisheries, agriculture and tourism. The island is connected by ferry routes, and occasional cruise ships.

== Geography ==
Karamian is surrounded by the Java Sea, and is administratively part of Masalembu Islands in the Sumenep Regency of East Java. Located over 200 km (120 mi) from the regency capital Kota Sumenep, it is geographically closer to Borneo. The island's waters are shallow, forcing vessels to anchor few miles off the island's coast. It has no prominent geographical feature, with the highest elevation being 7 m (23 ft) above sea level. Coastal zones feature sandy beaches, mangroves, and occasional outcroppings reached by local boat.

== Demographics ==
In 2015, the island has a population of 3,986 (Statistics Indonesia estimate) living in 1,657 households. The population included primarily Madurese and Bugis, practicing Islam.

== Economy ==
Fisheries employ about 1,000 people on the island, with agriculture being the second most practiced occupation. Coconuts and corn as the main crops. Emerging eco-tourism based on snorkeling/diving and white-sand beaches is on the rise in the 2020s.

== Infrastructure ==
There is a public elementary school, with madrasa counterparts of elementary and junior high schools. A Puskesmas sub-branch is also present. Maritime transport is the major mode of transport with regulated shipping lanes linking Karamian and Masalembu to Java–Madura–Kalimantan. Local craft ferries link Karamian with Masalembu and Surabaya. Solar power of 175 kWp was installed in October 2024 for providing electricity to the island.
