= Masakambing Island =

Island in East Java, Indonesia

Masakambing
- Interactive map of Masakambing

Geography
- Coordinates: 5°26′48″S 114°25′23″E
- Area: 7.79 km^{2} (3.01 sq mi)
- Highest elevation: 8 m (26 ft)

Administration
- Indonesia
- Province: East Java
- Regency: Sumenep
- Subdistrict: Masalembu
- Village: Masakambing

Demographics
- Population: 1,280 (2015)
- Pop. density: 164.3/km^{2} (425.5/sq mi)

Masakambing is a small Indonesian island in the Masalembu Islands of the Java Sea and is part of the regency of Sumenep. It is administered as the village of Masakambing.

The island is home to the only remaining wild individuals of the abbotti subspecies of the Yellow-crested cockatoo (Cacatua sulphurea).

== Geography ==
The island is located in the middle of the Java Sea approximately halfway between Java (more precisely Madura) and Borneo. It is about 9 km north of the slightly larger, more populated island of Masalembu. It measures around 4 km north-south and 3 km west-east, with a published land area of 7.79 square kilometers. Due to its small size, there are prominent features on the island which is largely flat with a peak elevation of just 8 meters above sea level.

The island is surrounded by mangrove trees, which provide habitat to the remaining Abbott's Cockatoo (C. sulphurea abbotti). The subspecies had a spread across the archipelago, until the clearing of vegetation from the islands for agriculture.

== Demographics ==
1,280 people in 544 households lived on the island in 2015, with a sex ratio of 91.62.

== Economy and facilities ==
Agriculture is the main employment of the island, with 282 jobs in 2015 followed by fisheries at 216. The only schools present on the island are two elementary schools, one publicly funded and the other a madrasa. Some tourists visit the island to observe the endemic parrots.

The island is dependent on Madurese mainland for various basic supplies. However, high waves in the waters often impede both the supply deliveries and the local fishermen from going out to sea.
