= Madurese language =

Language spoken in Indonesia

Madurese
- Bhâsa Madhurâ بّۤاسا مادّۅرۤا ꦧꦱꦩꦢꦸꦫ
- Pronunciation: [bʰɤsa maʈʰurɤ]
- Native to: Indonesia; Malaysia; Singapore
- Region: Madura Islands (incl. Sapudi, Masalembu), Bawean, and eastern salient of Java
- Ethnicity: Madurese; Baweanese; Pendalungan Madurese
- Native speakers: 10–13.6 million (2008)
- Language family: Austronesian: Malayo-Polynesian; Malayo-Sumbawan (?); Madurese
- Early forms: Proto-Austronesian: Proto-Malayo-Polynesian; Old Madurese
- Standard forms: Sumenep Madurese
- Dialects: Madurese dialects
- Writing system: Madurese Latin alphabet (Latèn); Pegon script (Pèghu); Javanese script (Carakan)

Official status
- Regulated by: Badan Pengembangan dan Pembinaan Bahasa (in Indonesia)

Language codes
- ISO 639-2: mad
- ISO 639-3: mad – Standard Madurese
- Glottolog: nucl1460
- Areas where Madurese is spoken by a majority of the population Areas where Madurese is spoken by a significant minority of the population

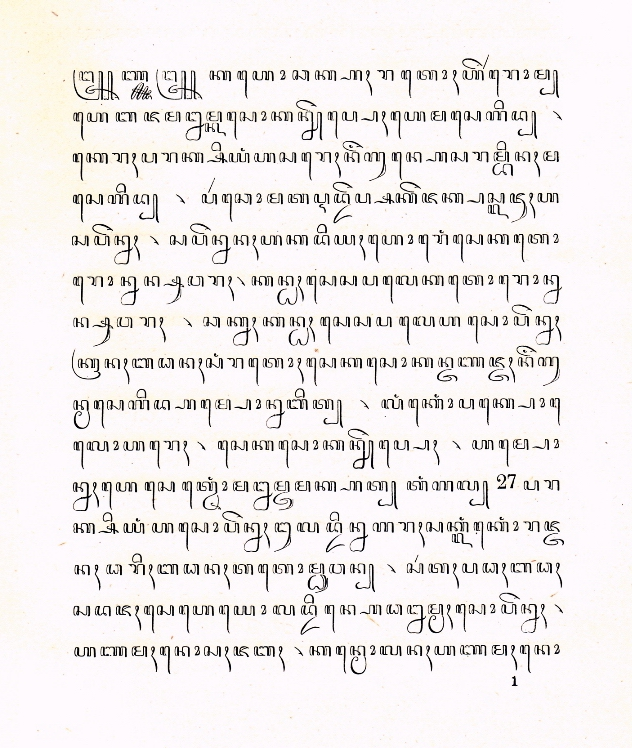
Madurese in Carakan (Javanese script).

Madurese (/ˌmædʒʊˈriːz/ MAD-juh-REEZ; Bhâsa Madhurâ, Pegon script: ݒا࣪سا ماڊۅرا࣪, Carakan script: ꦧꦱꦩꦝꦸꦫ, IPA: [bʰɤsa maʈʰurɤ]) is a language of the Madurese people, native to Madura Island and the eastern part of Java, Indonesia; it is also spoken by migrants to other parts of Indonesia, namely Surabaya, Malang, Gresik, the eastern salient of Java (comprising Pasuruan, Bondowoso, Probolinggo, Situbondo, Jember, Lumajang, and Banyuwangi), the Masalembu Islands, Raas Island, and some on Kalimantan. The number of speakers, although shrinking, is estimated to be approximately 10–13 million, making it one of the most widely spoken languages in the country. The Bawean language, which are dialect of Madurese, are also spoken by the Bawean people on Bawean Island, as well as by their descendants in Malaysia and Singapore.

It was traditionally written in the Javanese script, but the Latin script and the Pegon script (based on the Arabic script) are now more commonly used.

== Classification ==
According to K. Alexander Adelaar, Madurese is a Malayo-Sumbawan language of the Malayo-Polynesian language family, a branch of the larger Austronesian language family. Thus, despite apparent geographic spread, Madurese is more related to Kangean, Balinese, Malay, Sasak, and Sundanese, than it is to Javanese, the language used on the island of Java just across from Madura Island.

Links between Bali–Sasak languages and Madurese are more evident with the vernacular form (common form).

== Phonology ==
Latin letters are given according to the 2008 orthography.

=== Vowels ===
Madurese vowels
	Front	Central	Back	
	Front	Central	unrounded	rounded
Close	/i/ ꦆ ⟨i⟩	/ɨ/ ꦆ ⟨e⟩		/u/ ꦈ ⟨u⟩
Mid	/ɛ/ ꦌ ⟨è⟩	/ə/ ꦄꦼ ⟨e⟩	/ɤ/ ꦄꦼꦴ ⟨â⟩	/ɔ/ ꦎ ⟨o⟩
Open		/a/ ꦄ ⟨a⟩		

Vowels /a/, /ɛ/, /ə/, /ɔ/ and its higher counterparts /ɤ/, /i/, /ɨ/, /u/ are usually in complementary distribution. The last 4 vowels occur after voiced and aspirated consonants, while the first 4 vowels occur elsewhere. Consonants /l/, /r/, and /s/, although by default lower the vowels, are transparent after higher vowels, for example belli /bɨlli/ "to buy" instead of *bellè /bɨllɛ/. Similar vowel raising mechanisms triggered by voiced consonants can be also found in Upper Kutainese and Maranao.

=== Consonants ===
Madurese consonants
		Labial	Dental/ Alveolar	Retroflex	Palatal	Velar	Glottal
Nasal		/m/ ꦩ ⟨m⟩ ⟨م⟩	/n̪/ ꦤ ⟨n⟩ ⟨ن⟩	/ɳ/ ꦟ ⟨ṇ⟩ ⟨ن⟩	/ɲ/ ꦚ ⟨ny⟩ ⟨ۑ⟩	/ŋ/ ꦔ ⟨ng⟩ ⟨ڠ⟩	
Plosive	voiceless	/p/ ꦥ ⟨p⟩ ⟨ڤ⟩	/t̪/ ꦠ ⟨t⟩ ⟨ت⟩	/ʈ/ ꦛ ⟨ṭ⟩ ⟨ڟ⟩	/c/ ꦕ ⟨c⟩ ⟨چ⟩	/k/ ꦏ ⟨k⟩ ⟨ك⟩	/ʔ/ ꦃ ⟨'⟩ ⟨ء⟩
Plosive	voiced	/b/ ꦧ ⟨b⟩ ⟨ب⟩	/d̪/ ꦢ ⟨d⟩ ⟨د⟩	/ɖ/ ꦣ ⟨ḍ⟩ ⟨ڊ⟩	/ɟ/ ꦗ ⟨j⟩ ⟨ج⟩	/ɡ/ ꦒ ⟨g⟩ ⟨ࢴ⟩	
Plosive	aspirated	/pʰ/ ꦨ ⟨bh⟩ ⟨بّ⟩	/t̪ʰ/ ꦣ ⟨dh⟩ ⟨دّ⟩	/ʈʰ/ ꦞ ⟨ḍh⟩ ⟨ڊّ⟩	/cʰ/ ꦙ ⟨jh⟩ ⟨جّ⟩	/kʰ/ ꦓ ⟨gh⟩ ⟨ࢴّ⟩	
Fricative			/s/ ꦱ ⟨s⟩ ⟨س⟩				/h/ ꦲ ⟨h⟩ ⟨ه⟩
Trill			/r/ ꦫ ⟨r⟩ ⟨ر⟩				
Approximant			/l/ ꦭ ⟨l⟩ ⟨ل⟩		/j/ ꦪ ⟨y⟩ ⟨ي⟩	/w/ ꦮ ⟨w⟩ ⟨و⟩	

Madurese has more consonants than its neighboring languages due to it having voiceless unaspirated, voiceless aspirated (traditionally often transcribed as voiced aspirated), and voiced unaspirated. Similar to Javanese, it has a contrast between dental and alveolar (even retroflex) stops.

The letters ⟨f⟩, ⟨q⟩, ⟨v⟩, ⟨x⟩, and ⟨z⟩ are used in loanwords.

== Writing system ==
=== Alphabet letters ===
Madurese is currently mainly written in the Latin script rather than other scripts. The Latin alphabet in Madurese is known as Alfabet Latèn. The Latin alphabet letters used in Madurese spelling are as follows. The name of each letter is listed next to it.

Letter	Name	Letter	Name	Letter	Name
A a	a	J j	je	S s	es
B b	be	K k	ka	T t	te
C c	ce	L l	el	U u	u
D d	de	M m	em	V v	ve
E e	e	N n	en	W w	we
F f	ef	O o	o	X x	ex
G g	ge	P p	pe	Y y	ye
H h	ha	Q q	qi	Z z	zet
I i	i	R r	er		

=== Vowels ===
Vowels	Examples at the Beginning of Words	Examples in the Middle of Words	Example at the End of the Word
a	alos (fine) apoy (fire)	market (market) abâs (see)	sala (false) bâbâ (bottom)
e	eppa' (father) ella (don't)	nèser (pity) seksek (suffocation)	
è	èntar (go) ènga' (remember)	sèksèk (iris) malèng (thief)	talè (rope) sapè (cow)
i	iyâ (yes)	bhiru (green) raddhin (beautiful)	manḍi (bathing) mandhi (efficacious)
o	olo' (weak) olok (call)	rèpot (busy) dokar (dokar)	pao (mango) rao (weed)
u		dhuri (split, prick) ḍuri (thorn)	paju (sell) labu (fall)

Note:
1. The vowel /a/ has two sound variations, namely [a] and [â]; The vowel /a/ will make the sound [a] if the consonants attached to it are voiceless consonants and nasal consonants, and it will make the sound [â] if the consonants attached to it are voiced consonants. For practical purposes, the symbol /a/ is used for both.
2. The diacritical mark (`) on the vowel /è/ is still used because /è/ and /e/ in Madurese are different phonemes, as in the words seksek (shortness) and sèksèk (iris), tèmbhâng (weigh) and tembhâng (Iagu).

=== Consonant letters ===
Consonant Letters	Examples at the Beginning of Words	Examples in the Middle of Words	Example at the End of the Word
b	bârâ (swelling)	lobâr (finished)	sabâb (cause)
c	cangkem (chin)	moncar (published) lonca' (jump)	
d	dumeng (stupid)	badal (deputy)	morèd (pupil)
ḍ	ḍârâ (blood)	buḍu (rotten [for fish])	
f	faker (fakir)	shroud (shroud)	wâkaf (waqf)
g	gâmbus (orchestral)	anggâ' (arrogant, haughty)	
h	halal (lawful)	aher (end)	
j	jâḍiyâ (sana)	paju (sale)	
k	you (less)	sakè' (sick)	otek (brain)
l	ban (expensive)	malo (embarrassed)	ship (ship)
m	marè (already)	ambu (stop)	ḍâlem (in)
n	neser (pity)	penang (betel nut)	board (board)
p	perrèng (plate) perrèng (bamboo)	nompa (spill)	kèlap (lightning)
q	quran (Quran)	furqan (furqan)	
r	rammè (crowded)	sarè (search)	kasor (mattress)
s	sèyang (afternoon)	moso (enemy)	bherrâs (rice)
t	tèkos (rat)	matta (raw)	sèsèt (dragonfly)
v	vitamin (vitamin)	revolution (revolution)	
w	wâjib (obligatory)	towa (old)	
y	yâkèn (sure)	rèya (this)	
z	zâkat (zakat)	mu'jizât (miracle)	

Note:
1. The consonants /f/, /q/, /v/, /x/, and /z/ are used in Madurese to write words that are loanwords.
2. For practical purposes, the hamzah or glottal stop sound ([ʔ]) is symbolized by an apostrophe (..'..). This symbol is used because the velar /k/ ([k]) and the glottal /k/ ([ʔ]) are different phonemes in Madurese. Furthermore, glottal stops in Madurese are often placed in the middle of words. Examples include: "paka" [pakaʔ] (astringent taste), "cèlo" (sour taste), and "pa'a" [paʔaʔ] (tatah [tool for hollowing wood]).

=== Consonant Combinations ===
In Madurese, there are five letter combinations that represent consonants: "kh," "ng," "ny," "sy," and "th," as well as five aspirated consonants. In Madurese, aspirated and unaspirated consonants are distinct phonemes and therefore require different symbols. For example, bârâ (swelling) and bhârâ (lungs); ḍâḍâ (chest) and ḍhâḍhâ (quickly tired); bâjâ (moment, time) and bâjhâ (steel [a type of metal]) as well as bâgi (share) and bâghi (give).

Consonant Letters	Examples at the Beginning of Words	Examples in the Middle of Words	Example at the End of the Word
kh	khoso' (solemn)	èkhlas (sincere)	
ng	ngoḍâ (young)	bângal (brave)	sarong (sarong)
ny	nyaman (tasty)	bânnya' (a lot)	
sy	syarat (condition)	masyarakat (society)	
bh	bhârâ (lungs)	cabbhi (chili pepper)	
th	thokthok (tap)	ketthok (cut)	
dh	dhârâ (dove)	dhudhul (dodol [a type of food])	
ḍh	ḍhenḍheng (dizzy)	aḍḍhâng (block)	
gh	ghâghâman (sharp weapon)	bighi (seed)	
jh	jhârân (horse)	tajhin (porridge [a type of food])	

=== Diphthongs ===
In Madurese, there are three diphthongs symbolized by ay, oy, and uy.

Consonant Letters	Examples at the Beginning of Words	Examples in the Middle of Words	Examples at the End of Words
ay		nyaynyay (soft)	tapay (tapai, tape) labây (woven thread)
oy		loyloy (tired, powerless)	kompoy (grandson)
uy			kerbhuy (buffalo)

== Morphology ==
Madurese nouns are not inflected for gender and are pluralized via reduplication. Its basic word order is subject–verb–object. Negation is expressed by putting a negative particle before the verb, adjective or noun phrase. As with other similar languages, there are different negative particles for different kinds of negation.

== Vocabulary ==
Madurese		Indonesian	English
Latin	Pèghu	Indonesian	English
lakè’	لاكَيء	laki-laki	male
binè’	بِينَيء	perempuan	female
iyâ	إيۤا	iya	yes
enja′	أٓنجاْء	tidak	no
aèng [aɛŋ]	أئَيڠ	air	water
arè	أرَي	matahari	sun
mata	ماتا	mata	eye
sengko'	سَيڠكَوء	aku/saya	I/me
bâ'na	بۤاءنا	kamu/engkau	you

=== Numerals ===
Madurese		Indonesian	English
Latin	Pèghu	Indonesian	English
sèttong	سَيتَّوڠ	satu	one
duwâ'	دووۤاء	dua	two
tello'	تٓلَّوء	tiga	three
empa'	اۤمڤاء	empat	four
lèma’	لَيماء	lima	five
ennem	اۤنّٓم	enam	six
pètto’	ڤَيتَّوء	tujuh	seven
bâllu’	بۤالّوء	delapan	eight
sanga′	ساڠاء	sembilan	nine
sapolo	ساڤَولَو	sepuluh	ten

== Language levels ==
Madurese, like Sasak, Javanese, and Balinese, also has levels/registers, but they differ slightly in that they are divided into only three:

- Èngghi-Bhunten, is the most polite and refined form of speech used to show respect for the person being spoken to or discussed. This includes addressing parents, elders, teachers, people of higher rank, community leaders, and other respected figures.
- Èngghi-Enten, as described by Davies, "is to be used between social equals who are not well acquainted, husbands to their wives, parents-in-law to their sons- and daughters-in-law, and between buyer and seller in the market; it may also be used among friends and family. It may also be used when an older person addresses a younger person but wants to show some respect due to the relative higher social status of the younger addressee."
- Enjâ'-Iyâ, is a sentence form used in familiar situations among peers or younger people. This is often used in everyday social situations. Enjâ'-Iyâ is not commonly used in first meetings; speakers usually ask permission to use Enjâ'-Iyâ after getting to know each other. With younger speakers or children, Enjâ'-Iyâ is common and acceptable to use without asking permission first.

Example:

- "¿Saponapa arghâèpon pao panèka?" "How much are the mangoes?" (Èngghi-Bhunten)
- "¿Sanapè arghâna paona?" "How much are the mangoes?" (Èngghi-Enten)
- "¿Bârâmpa arghâna paona?" "How much does the mango cost?" (Enjâ'-Iyâ)

== Dialects ==
Madurese language also has dialects spread throughout the region where it is spoken. There are several dialects that are commonly used, such as:

1. Western Madurese
  1. Bangkalan dialect (in Bangkalan)
  2. Sampang dialect (in Sampang)
2. Eastern Madurese
  1. Pamekasan dialect (in Pamekasan)
  2. Sumenep dialect (in Sumenep)
3. Pendalungan Madurese (in eastern salient of Java region; also known as Tapal Kuda)
  1. Banyuwangi dialect (in Banyuwangi)
  2. Bondowoso dialect (in Bondowoso)
  3. Jember dialect (in Jember)
  4. Lumajang dialect (in Lumajang)
  5. Pasuruan dialect (in regency and city of Pasuruan)
  6. Probolinggo dialect (in regency and city of Probolinggo)
  7. Situbondo dialect (in Situbondo)
4. Bawean dialect (in Bawean Island)
  1. Daun subdialect
  2. Kepuhteluk subdialect
  3. Bawean Creole subdialect
  4. Suwari subdialect
5. Islands Madurese
  1. Giliraja–Raas dialect (in Giliraja and Raas Islands)
  2. Sapudi dialect (in Sapudi Island)

The dialect used as the standard form of Madurese is the Sumenep dialect, because in the past Sumenep was the center of the Madurese kingdom and culture. The other dialects are rural dialects that gradually blended with the mobilization of Madurese society. Meanwhile, in the eastern salient of Java, these dialects often mix with Javanese language, and this dialect itself is called the Pendalungan dialect. The Pendalungan Madurese people outside Situbondo, Bondowoso, and the eastern part of Probolinggo, generally master the Javanese language, in addition to the Madurese language.

For example, in the case of the pronoun 'you':

- The word bâ'en 'you' is commonly used in Bangkalan. However, the word bâ'na is used in Sumenep and Bawean.
- The word kakè 'you' is commonly used in eastern part of Bangkalan and Sampang.
- The words hèdâ and sèdâ 'you' are used in rural areas of Bangkalan.

== Sample text ==
From Article 1 of the 1948 Universal Declaration of Human Rights.

Latin
Sâdhâjâna orèng lahèr mardhika èsarengè dhrâjhât klabân ha'-ha' sè padâ. Sâdhâjâna èparèngè akal sareng nurani bân kodhu areng-sareng akanca kadhi tarètan.

Aksara Pèghu
ساڊۤاجۤانا عَورَيڠ لاهَير مارڊيكا عَيسارۤڠَي ڊرۤاجۤات کلابۤان هاء۲ سَي پادۤا. ساڊۤاجۤانا عَيڤارَيڠَي أکال سارۤڠ نوراني كَوڊو أرۤڠ-سارۤڠ أكانچا كاڊي تارَيتان.

Translation
"All Human Beings are born free and equal in dignity and rights, they are endowed with reason and conscience and should act towards one another in a spirit of brotherhood."

== Bibliography ==
- Davies, W. D. (2010). A Grammar of Madurese. Mouton Grammar Library. Berlin: De Gruyter Mouton.
- Kiliaan, H. N. (1897). Madoereesche Spraakkunst (in Dutch). Batavia: Landsdrukkerij.
