= Eastern salient of Java =

Eastern salient of Java Ujung Timur Pulau Jawa
- Geographical region
- Nicknames: Tapal Kuda ("The Horseshoe"); De Oosthoek ("the eastern corner")
- The eastern salient of Java (bottom-right) shown in the context of the island of Java (top).
- Country: Indonesia
- Province: East Java
- Administrative subdivisions: Regency/city: Probolinggo Regency; Probolinggo City; Lumajang Regency; Jember Regency; Situbondo Regency; Bondowoso Regency; Banyuwangi Regency; Pasuruan Regency; Pasuruan City

Population
  - Estimate (2025): About 8.48 million

Demographics
  - Ethnicity: Native: Javanese – Tengger – Osing; Madurese; Balinese; Foreign: Arabs; Chinese
  - Language: Indonesian (official); Javanese – Arekan Javanese – Mataraman Javanese – Tengger Javanese – Osing Javanese; Madurese – Banyuwangi Madurese – Bondowoso Madurese – Jember Madurese – Lumajang Madurese – Pasuruan Madurese – Probolinggo Madurese – Situbondo Madurese; Balinese; Indonesian Arabic
  - Religion: Islam (majority), Christianity, Hinduism, Kejawèn, and others

The eastern salient of Java (Note: Indonesian: ujung timur 'eastern end' or Tapal Kuda 'The Horseshoe' – referring to the region's shape on the map; Javanese: bang wetan 'far east'; Dutch: Oosthoek 'eastern corner') is a region that makes up the easternmost part of the island of Java, Indonesia. It is not a formal or administrative subdivision, but rather a designation often used to refer to its distinct history, culture, and geographical feature. It is generally considered to begin in the Tengger mountain range and extend eastwards to the east coast of Java. It is entirely contained within the Indonesian province of East Java.

== Geography ==
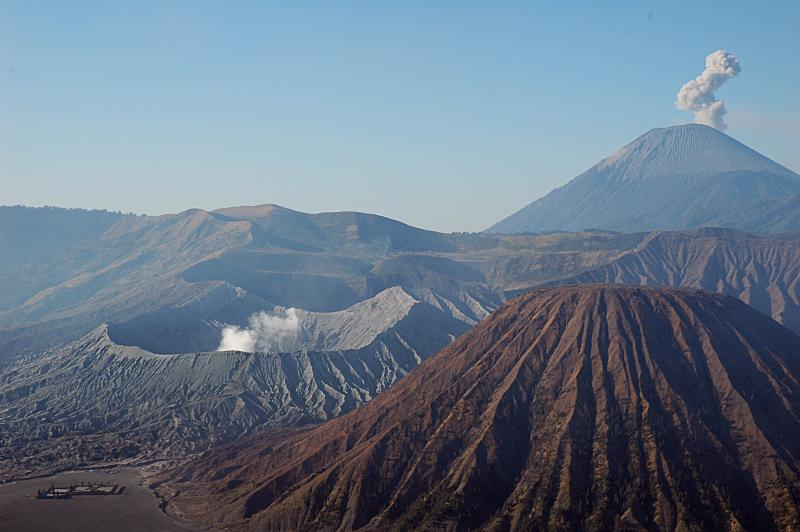
The Bromo, Tengger, Semeru volcanic complex of the eastern salient

The eastern salient consists of the narrow peninsula in the eastern extremity of the Java island. Anthropologist Robert W. Hefner considered the western boundary of the region to be just east of the modern-day Malang-Surabaya highway. The region extends 180 kilometers east-to-west, (out of Java's total length of about 1,000 kilometers), to the east coast of Java, just across the strait from Bali. Unlike Java's central heartland and northern coast, the region is drier, more rugged, and lacks major rivers. These factors make wet-rice agriculture less extensive here than in central regions of Java. The region covers the regencies of Probolinggo, Lumajang, Jember, Situbondo, Bondowoso and Banyuwangi, as well as the city of Probolinggo, with a total land area of 13,691.36 km^{2}. Parts of Pasuruan Regency and the city of Pasuruan, situated west of the Tengger massif, are sometimes considered part of the region, but are excluded from the official totals.

The western section of the region, among Java's most rugged, isolated the eastern salient from Java's central heartland to its west. The Tengger massif (including Mount Bromo), and Mount Semeru, Java's highest peak, lie in this section. Together they form the Bromo Tengger Semeru National Park. The Iyang-Argapura massif lies in the central section, and the Ijen composite volcano lies in the eastern section.

Between the tight mountain formations, there are river basins which support rice-based communities. However, the basin area is much narrower than in other parts of Java. Blambangan Peninsula lies in the southeasternmost area.

== History ==
During the formative early period of Javanese history, the eastern salient of Java was quite isolated from the center of Javanese polity. As the cradle of Javanese civilization blossomed in the ninth century in the Progo and the Opak River valley in Central Java during Mataram kingdom, it later shifted east to the Brantas River valley during Kediri, Singhasari and later Majapahit Kingdom circa fourteenth century. During Majapahit period, the eastern realm was regarded as a peripheral area of the Javanese kingdom, which centered in Majapahit and the surrounding Brantas River basin. Whereas the eastern salient areas such as Lumajang were regarded as the outlying provinces.

The Majapahit kingdom was established in 1293 by Raden Wijaya with the help of cunning and able Arya Wiraraja, the Regent of Madura. As the reward of Wiraraja's support, in 1295, Raden Wijaya agreed to give him the eastern salient of Java, which includes Blambangan areas with Lumajang as its capital. The eastern realm become the vassal or as mancanagara (provinces) of Majapahit. However, it seems that the eastern realm steadily had grown quite independently. The eastern salient became the host of the eastern court which rivaled Majapahit's central authority. The rivalry erupted in Regreg war (1404–1406), which was fought as the contest of succession between the Western court led by Wikramawardhana, against the Eastern court led by Bhre Wirabhumi. In 1406 the western troops led by Bhre Tumapel, the son of Wikramawardhana, penetrated the eastern palace and defeated Bhre Wirabhumi.

At the time of the collapse of Majapahit in the late fifteenth century, Blambangan stood on its own as the one solitary Hindu kingdom left in Java, controlling the larger part of Java's eastern salient. For almost three centuries, Blambangan was situated between two different political factions, the Islamic state of Mataram in the west, and various Hindu realms in Bali (Gelgel, Buleleng, and Mengwi) in the east. Both neighbouring powers simultaneously contested the territory of Blambangan.

For most of the modern era, the eastern salient lay outside the control of Javanese political powers, which were typically based in Central Java. Sultan Agung of Mataram's conquest of eastern Java in 1614–1625, while managing to conquer Surabaya, Malang, Pasuruan and Madura, did not establish control over the eastern salient. A renewed campaign in 1640 brought the region under Mataram's control until Agung's death in 1645. His successor, Amangkurat I, tried unsuccessfully to subdue the region in 1647. From this point neither Mataram nor any other central Javanese polity would have effective control over the region. It remained outside Mataram's influence between the seventeenth to nineteenth centuries, when that region was developing the features and characteristics known today as essentially Javanese.

In 1686, Surapati, a resistance leader against the Dutch East Indies Company (known by the Dutch acronym, "VOC") fled to the eastern salient and set up an independent polity at Pasuruan, which ultimately controlled most of the region. His domain also extended to territories formerly controlled by Mataram. Mataram counter-attacked in 1690 but was defeated, partly because of Surapati's previous experience in European military techniques. A combined Dutch-Mataram-Madurese force killed Surapati in 1706 and captured Pasuruan in 1707. However, neither the Dutch or Mataram were able to establish control over the region as a whole.

In the aftermath of the Java War (1741–1743) in which the Dutch defeated Mataram, Mataram gave up its claim to the region and "ceded" it to the Dutch (although it did not control the region in the first place) along with other concessions. The Dutch attempt to establish control was met by resistance, including from people calling themselves "descendants of Surapati". In 1764, the Dutch, supported by local allies, defeated the resistance in the Tengger section of the region, and in 1771 they pacified Blambangan, the easternmost section of the region.

Under Dutch control, the region was called De Oosthoek ("The east corner") and was supervised by a gezaghebber ("commander"). The Dutch encouraged the population's conversion to Islam, in order to erode the Hindu-Balinese influence from further east. After Indonesia's independence, the region became part of the East Java province, and is often called Tapal Kuda ("The Horseshoe"), referring to how the region looks on a map.

== Inhabitants and culture ==
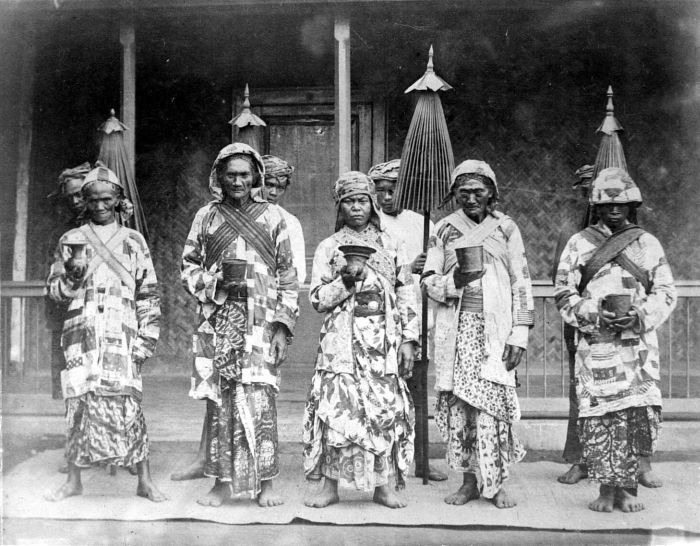
Priests from the Tengger mountains in the 1890s. While the rest of the eastern salient is predominantly Muslim, the Tenggerese are predominantly Hindu and maintain a Shivaite priesthood.

The eastern salient, covering a land area of 13,691.36 km^{2}, had a population of 7,592,959, according to the Indonesia 2010 census, and 8,218,398 at the 2020 Census; the official estimate as at mid 2025 was 8,482,839. As with most of Central and East Java, its inhabitants are mostly ethnic Javanese. This includes the Tenggerese sub-ethnic group who live in the Tengger mountains and the Osing subgroup in the easternmost Banyuwangi regency. Because the region was outside Mataram's influence during the "formative period" of the Javanese tradition, the inhabitants of the eastern salient often differ from other Javanese in terms of etiquette, language, art, and social hierarchy. In contrast to the social hierarchy of Central Java, the eastern salient maintained its frontier character, populist mannerism, and less hierarchical ways, which remain to the present day.

Because of steady migration from the island of Madura off the eastern salient's north coast, the Madurese also inhabit the area. Since the nineteenth century, Madurese have become the dominant ethnic group in some areas, such as Banyuwangi, Pasuruan, Lumajang, Jember, Probolinggo, Bondowoso, and Situbondo.

The region is predominantly Muslim, but Islam was not well-established until the late eighteenth century. Major conversions to Islam occurred when the region was under the VOC's control, with the company supporting the conversions (sometimes by force). The Tengger mountains are a notable exception. The Tenggerese are predominantly Hindu, and a Shivaite priesthood remains. In addition, parts of the highlands have few orthodox Muslim influences, and have a strong Kejawen tradition.
