= Bawean language =

Languages of Indonesia

Bawean
- bhâsa Phêbiyên
- Native to: Indonesia
- Region: Bawean, Gresik Regency
- Ethnicity: Bawean
- Native speakers: 20.000 (1984)
- Language family: Austronesian: Malayo-Polynesian; Malayo-Sumbawan (?); Madurese; Bawean
- Dialects: Daun; Kepuhteluk; Suwari
- Writing system: Latin (Madurese alphabet); Pegon

Official status
- Recognised minority language in: Indonesia

Language codes
- ISO 639-3: –
- Glottolog: bawe1237
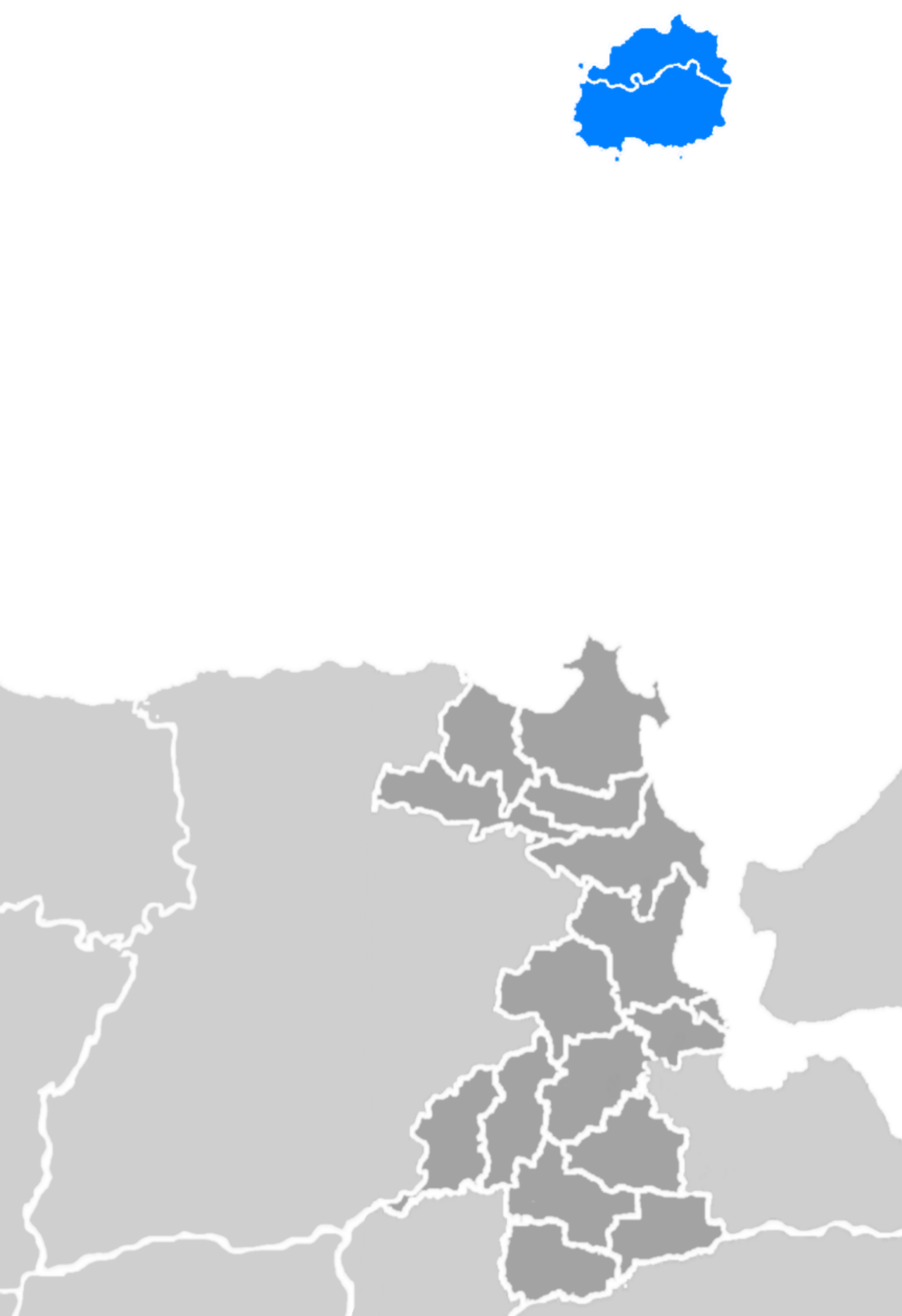
- The Bawean dialect of Madurese language spoken predominantly by its population Other Gresik Regency subdivisions (including Bawean island)

Bawean dialect, also known as Bawean language, is a dialect of Madurese language spoken predominantly by Bawean people in Bawean island. (Note: According to Glottolog 4.8, Madurese language were divided into 7 dialects consisting of: Kangean, Bawean, Bangkalan, Pamekasan, Sampang, Sumenep, and Sapudi dialects.) This dialect have 4 major sub-dialects each spoken predominantly in the villages of Daun and Suwari in Sangkapura district, and the village of Kepuhteluk in Tambak district. As well as additional sub-dialects of Bawean Creole.

== Classification ==
According to Glottolog, Bawean language, classified as Madurese language dialect along with five other dialects. Madurese languages itself is a Malayo-Sumbawan language of the Malayo-Polynesian language family, a branch of the larger Austronesian language family. Around 94% of attested vocabulary of Bawean dialect were having similarities with the one in Madurese language, while the rest of attested words shown relation with Javanese language and a little amount of unique words native to Bawean such as kostela [kɔstela] and eson [ɛsɔn]. However, some older sources classifying this dialect as separated language from rest of Madurese dialects. Nababan (1984) in his book Bahasa-Bahasa Indonesia (English: Languages [in] Indonesia) classifying this dialect as a whole different language native to Bawean people with around 20,000 speakers.

According to Zainudin, et al. (1978), Madurese language only spoken in Madura, Tapal Kuda region of East Java, and other small archipelago in the north of Bali and east of Madura such as Kangean and Sapudi islands with 3 major dialects: Bangkalan, Pamekasan, and Sumenep, along with other dialects such as Sampang, Pasuruan, Pinggirpapas, Situbondo, Bondowoso, Banyuwangi, Lumajang, Giliraja–Raas, and Kangean (the latter is generally considered a separate language). Bawean dialect were not included in as dialects of Madurese languages despite the indication of sharing vocabulary. Less popular classification stating that Bawean dialect also considered as a pidgin that has undergone a process of creolization, so it has a variety of mixed vocabulary from other languages, such as Javanese (especially from the predominantly Javanese-speaking region of Gresik Regency), Banjarese, and Buginese language.

== Dialects ==
Interactive map showing location of each dialects spoken predominantly in. Marker shown were indicating Daun (green) and Suwari (blue) village in Sangkapura district and Kapuhteluk (orange) village in Tambak district, Gresik Regency

Despite being a dialect of Madurese language, this language also has sub-dialects that is distinct from each other in terms of phonology and morphology. This dialect difference can be found in several villages on Bawean Island. Eva Wijayanti revealed that there are three villages that have quite different dialects, namely the villages of Daun and Suwari in the district of Sangkapura, and the village of Kepuhteluk in the district of Tambak. These dialect variations also characterize each village. Therefore, just by hearing the dialect they use, other Bawean people will easily recognize which village they come from.

The dialectal variations of the three villages are reflected in the pronunciation of the word 'I'. The people of Daun village call 'I' with the word éson, while the people of Suwari village call it éhon. Then, the people of Kepuhteluk village will refer to 'I' as bulâ.

In the Diponggo village, a variety of Javanese is spoken. Most Diponggo villagers are descendants of Javanese people who have retained their language, although the Diponggo variety of Javanese has undergone some lexical and phonetic influence from Bawean Madurese.

Comparison between 4 major sub-dialects of Bawean dialect
Attested word	Indonesian	Bawean sub-dialects		
Attested word	Indonesian	Suwari	Daun	Kepuhteluk
hand	tangan	[taŋan]		
one	satu	[hɪtuŋ]	[sit.tur]	[sit.tuŋ]
to think	pikir	[mεʔkεr]		[pεʔkεr]
to squish	peras	[mǝr.rǝs]	[pǝr.rǝs]	[mǝr.rǝs]
cucumber	mentimun	[tεmɔn]	[ǝntεmɔn]	[antεmɔn]
circling	keliling	[ŋɔlεlεŋ]	[kɔlεlεŋ]	[kɔlεlεŋ]
star fruit	belimbing	[bʰǝlimbʰiŋ]		

=== Creolization ===
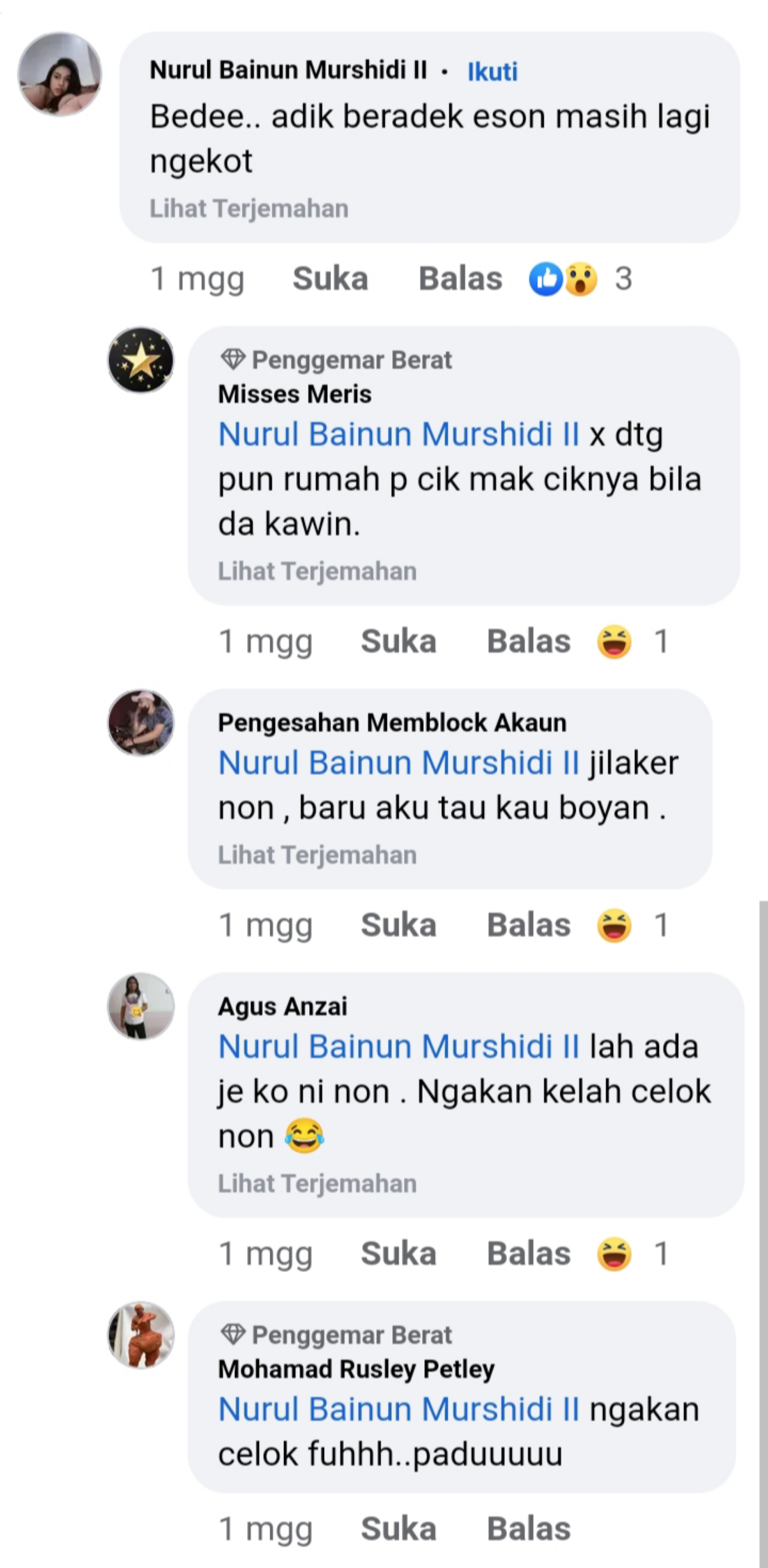
An example of a conversation in Bawean creole in the comments section of a Facebook page.

In the Bawean language there is also a form of creole language as a result of acculturation that occurred in the ethnic community of Bawean. This language is considered a process of creolization of Madurese language, especially Bawean dialect, with influence from other languages such as Javanese, Buginese and Malay. This creole form of the language differs from the original variation of Bawean spoken on Bawean island. This creole language variety is generally spoken by Bawean migrants and descendants who settled in Malaysia and Singapore, predominantly in Johor, Kuala Lumpur and Selangor (Malaysia), and Lorong Buangkok (Singapore).

== Phonology ==
There are at least 28 phoneme in Bawean dialect consisting of 18 consonant and 10 basic vowel phoneme. The phonemes found in the Bawean dialect are shown in tables below, the letters in angle brackets ⟨...⟩ indicate the phonetic orthography in the cited source.

=== Vowel ===
In Bawean dialect, there are two vowel phonemes that are not present in the main dialect of Madurese (/o/ and /e/), making this dialect have 10 vowel phonemes in total presented below.

Comparison between Bawean and Madurese

Bawean dialect
	Front	Central	Back
Close	/i/ ⟨i⟩		/u/ ⟨u⟩
Near-close	/ɪ/ ⟨I⟩		/ʊ/ ⟨U⟩
Mid	/e/ ⟨e⟩	/ə/ ⟨ə⟩	/o/ ⟨o⟩
Open-mid	/ɛ/ ⟨ɛ⟩		/ɔ/ ⟨Ͻ⟩
Open		/a/ ⟨a⟩	

Madurese language
Front	Central	Back	
Front	Central	unrounded	rounded
/i/ ⟨i⟩	/ɨ/ ⟨e⟩		/u/ ⟨u⟩
/e/ ⟨è⟩	/ə/ ⟨e⟩	/ɤ/ ⟨â⟩	
			/ɔ/ ⟨o⟩
	/a/ ⟨a⟩		

Complementary distribution of vowels in Madurese are not strictly followed by Bawean, effectively allowing vowel splits.

=== Consonant ===
In contrast to its more vocal phonemes, the consonant phonemes in the Bawean dialect are fewer than in the one on Madurese. Bawean dialect only has around 25 consonants compared to Madurese language which has around 27 consonant phonemes. The small number of consonants in this dialect may be due to the absence of the retroflex plosive phonemes (/ʈ/ and /ɖ/) which are often found in the Madurese phonology but considerably rare in this dialect.

		Labial	Dental/ Alveolar	Palatal	Velar	Glottal
Nasal		/m/ ⟨m⟩	/n/ ⟨n⟩	/ɲ/ ⟨ñ⟩	/ŋ/ ⟨ŋ⟩	
Plosive	voiceless	/p/ ⟨p⟩	/t/ ⟨t⟩	/c/ ⟨c⟩	/k/ ⟨k⟩	/ʔ/ ⟨?⟩
Plosive	voiced	/b/ ⟨b⟩	/d/ ⟨d⟩	/ɟ/ ⟨j⟩	/ɡ/ ⟨g⟩	
Plosive	aspirated	/pʰ/	/t̪ʰ/	/cʰ/	/kʰ/	
Fricative			/s/ ⟨s⟩			/h/ ⟨h⟩
Trill			/r/ ⟨r⟩			
Approximant			/l/ ⟨l⟩	/j/ ⟨y⟩	/w/ ⟨w⟩	
