= Madurese people =

Austronesian ethnic group

Orèng Mâdhurâ أَوريڠ مادْوراْ
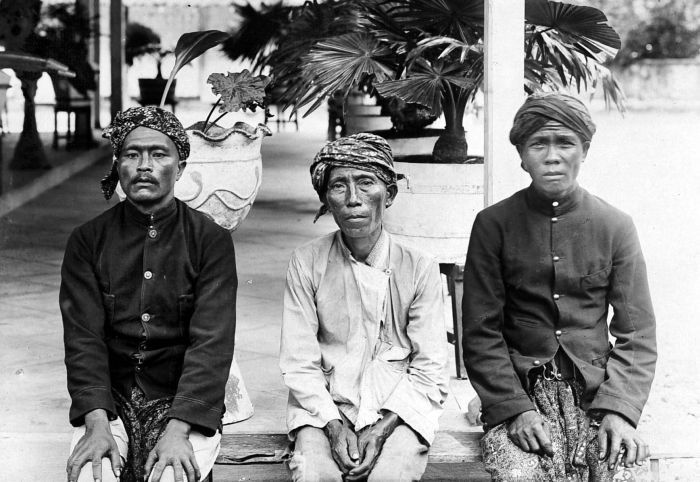
- A portrait of Madurese village head

Total population
- 7,179,356

Regions with significant populations
- Indonesia
- East Java: 6,520,403
- West Kalimantan: 274,869
- Jakarta: 79,925
- South Kalimantan: 53,002
- East Kalimantan: 46,823
- West Java: 43,001
- Central Kalimantan: 42,668
- Bali: 29,864
- Bangka Belitung: 15,429
- Central Java: 12,920

Languages
- Native: Madurese; Dialects: Western Madurese (Bangkalan Madurese and Sampang Madurese) • Eastern Madurese (Pamekasan Madurese and Sumenep Madurese) • Pendalungan Madurese (Banyuwangi Madurese, Bondowoso Madurese, Jember Madurese, Lumajang Madurese, Pasuruan Madurese, Probolinggo Madurese, and Situbondo Madurese) • Bawean Madurese (Daun, Kepuhteluk, Bawean Creole, and Suwari) • Madurese Islands (Kangean, Giliraja–Raas and Sapudi); Also: Javanese, Indonesian, Arabic (for religious use)

Religion
- Predominantly Islam

Related ethnic groups
- Austronesian peoples; Pendalungan Madurese; Bawean; Kangeanese; Buginese; Javanese

The Madurese (Note: /ˌmædʒʊˈriːz/ MAD-juh-REEZ) (Madurese: Orèng Mâdhurâ, Pegon script: أَوريڠ مادْوراْ; Javanese: ꦠꦾꦁꦩꦼꦝꦸꦤ꧀ꦠꦼꦤ꧀, romanized: Tyang Mêdhuntên; Indonesian: Orang Madura) are one of the Austronesian ethnic groups native to the Indonesian island of Madura and northern part of Eastern salient of Java, off the northeastern coast of Java. They speak their own native Madurese (with diverse varieties), sharing a common history, traditions, and cultural identity. Nationwide, the Madurese are the fifth-largest ethnic group in Indonesia, and one of the well-known Indonesian national dishes, Satay, is associated with the Madurese as part of their rich culinary heritage. They are also known as the largest owners of traditional grocery shops in Indonesia.

About six million native Madurese are living on their ancestral land, Madura Island, and around half a million reside in eastern Java, mainly in the regencies of Jember, Banyuwangi, and others. The Madurese population in Java forms a subgroup called the Pandalungan Madurese, who speak a blend of Javanese and Madurese.

The Madurese are not only known as the inventors of satay but also as the creators of the Karapan sapi bull race. The group have historically been pioneers of classical Islamic religious movements in Indonesia, with the Pondok Pesantren serving as a vital center for Madurese Muslims to study Islam, particularly Indonesian Islam. In addition to being merchants, the Madurese diaspora is traditionally known for farming and practicing the Pencak silat martial art. The Madurese men often work with their cultural Clurit sickles, wearing distinctive cultural clothing characterized by red and white stripes derived from the Majapahit naval flag (a historical eastern Javanese empire that once controlled Madura Island). Other colors like black, red, yellow, white, green, and blue are also considered cultural symbols, as seen in their traditional Madurese-style batik.

== Population and distribution ==
Official and academic data on the population of Madurese people vary considerably. During the nationwide population census conducted in Indonesia in 2010, the Madurese people made up 3.03% of the country's population, that is 7,179,356 people. On the other hand, some scientific sources operate with significantly larger figures, around 10.5 to 10.8 million people. In any case, the Madurese people are among the largest ethnics of Indonesia, thus, according to the statistics of the 2010 census, they occupy the fourth largest ethnic group after the Javanese people, Sundanese people, and Batak people.

Historically, the Madurese people inhabit Madura Island and, located to the east of it, a group of smaller islands in Java Sea such as Kambing Island, Sapudi Islands and Kangean Islands. Here, they number about 3.3 million people, which is more than 90% of the population in these territories. Approximately the same number of Madurese people live in the eastern end of the Java Island, and more than 400,000 people in various parts of the Indonesian part of the island of Kalimantan. In addition, tens of thousands of the Madurese people live in other regions of Indonesia; especially, there are significant Madurese communities in the capital city of Jakarta (about 80,000 people), in Bali (about 30,000 people) and in the province of Bangka Belitung Islands (more than 15,000 people). There are also small Madurese communities in the countries of Southeast Asia adjacent to Indonesia, particularly, in Malaysia and Singapore.

== Language ==
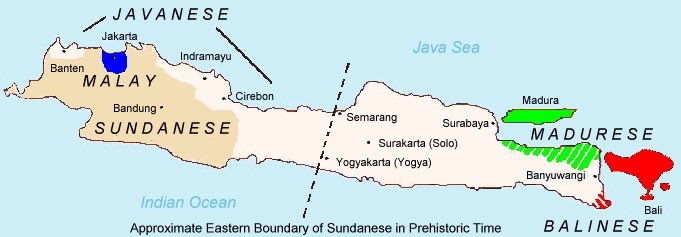
The area of the Madurese language on Madura Island and north eastern of Java Island is marked with green.

Distribution of Madurese language in Madura and eastern part of Java.

The Madurese people speak the Madurese language, which belongs to the Austronesian family, more specifically the Malayo-Sumbawan group. It is divided into several dialects. Linguistically, there are different points of view regarding the dialects of the Madurese language. Older works would normally identify two or four dialects, but modern specialists have concluded that there are six dialects. The most developed dialect in the lexical terms is the Sumenep dialect, which underlies the literary Madurese language. The most common variety is Bangkalan dialect, which often functions as a lingua franca between Madurese people from different localities.

In some parts of East Java among a large number of Madurese people, a mixed language between Madurese and Javanese is spoken. In addition to these native languages, many are also fluent in Indonesian, the national language. The classified dialects of the Madurese language are Sumenep (standard dialect), Sampang, Pamekasan, Bangkalan, Bawean, and Sapudi. Other dialects such as Pendalungan dialect chain, have a very high level of mixing with Javanese language, spoken in Jember, Lumajang (see Lumajang Madurese), southern part of Malang, Pasuruan (city and regency; see Pasuruan Madurese), Situbondo (see Situbondo Madurese), northern and western parts of Banyuwangi (see Banyuwangi Madurese), Probolinggo (city and regency), and Bondowoso which is known as the eastern salient of Java. As well as the Giliraja–Raas dialect which is spoken on Raas Island and its surroundings, in the Sumenep archipelago — but does not include Kangean which is a separate language.

== Religion ==
The majority of Madurese practice Sunni Islam. Characteristically, unlike a significant part of their fellow religious Indonesians, Madurese people enjoy a reputation as very zealous adherents of Islam. Muslim theologians play an important role in their spiritual and social life. A significant part of the Madurese people is trained in traditional Pesantren Muslim schools, which play an important role in their spiritual and social life.

== Socio-economic structure ==
=== Basic livelihood ===
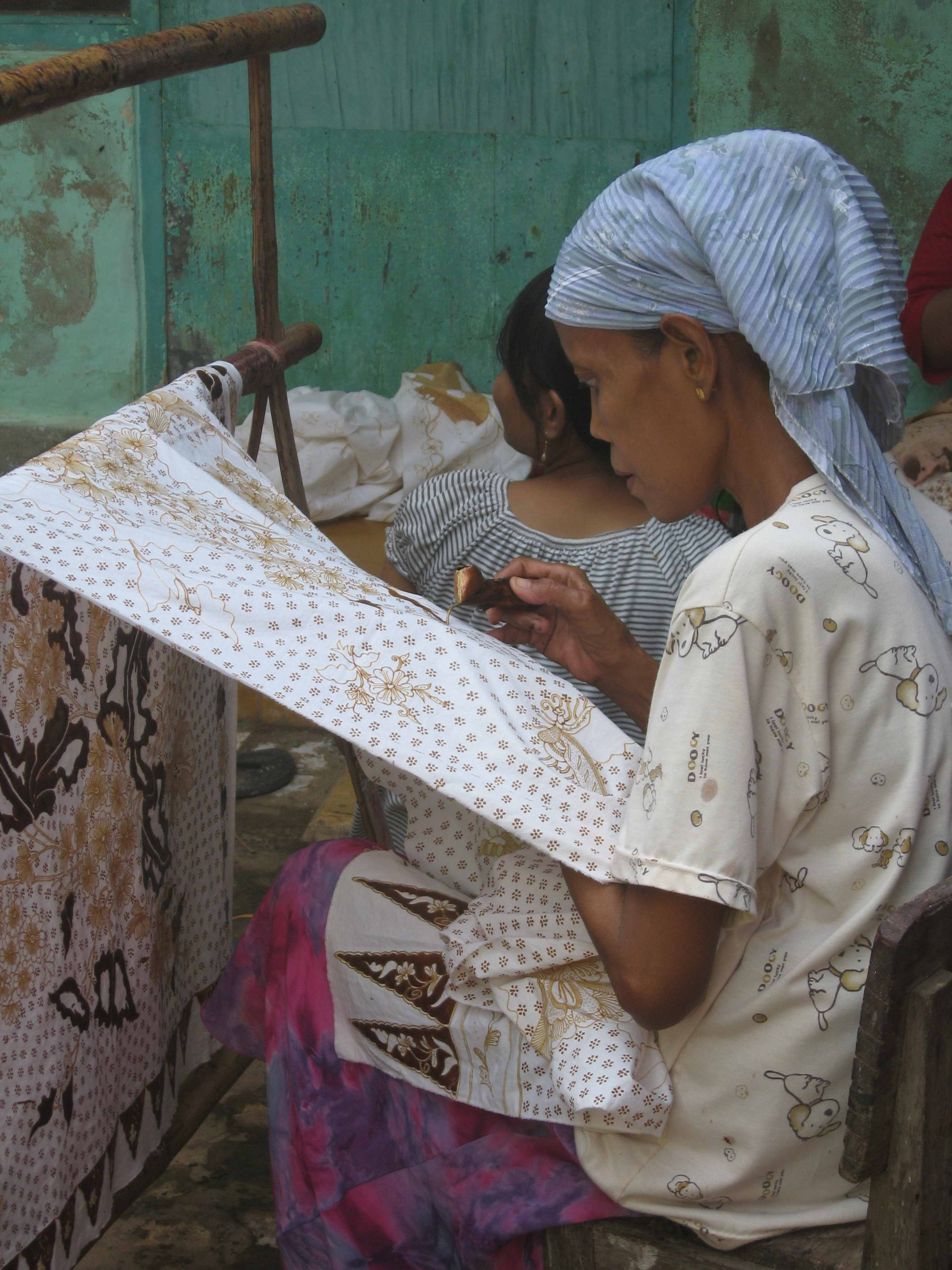
A Madurese batik maker in Tanjungbumi, Bangkalan Regency, Madura, Indonesia

Family is important to the Madurese, and they commonly live in villages that function around an Islamic religious center. According to Islamic law, a man may have more than one wife. Marriage proposals are usually made by the groom's parents, preferably to a first or second cousin. If the proposal is accepted, the bride's parents are then presented with the "bride price", which is usually cattle. The groom's parents then set the date for the upcoming wedding. Newlywed couples often live with the bride's family. Islam is an integral part of the social, political and economic life of the Madurese.

The main traditional occupations of the Madurese are animal farming, which mainly includes breeding of cattle, goats, horses, poultry and fighting cocks. The Madurese are known for herding cattle, hence they are often referred by a common nickname as the "cowboys" of Indonesia. Cattle are an important part of the culture, and bull-racing is one of their favorite sports.

Agriculture among the Madurese people on the island of Madura is poorly developed due to low fertility and very poor soil conditions, thus, farming is not important in Madurese culture. As a result, the Madurese tend not to farm, unless on other islands with very good soil conditions, such as the Madurese people in Java, where agriculture is practiced more widely and have developed to a lesser degree. The main crops are such as corn, cassava, rice, tobacco, beans and cloves. Among craftsmen, tanning, pottery, batik manufacturing, blacksmithing, as well as small vassals and boat builders are also important occupations. In coastal areas, the Madurese are actively engaged in fishing, trading and as well as extraction of salt (from Madura Island). Lastly, the Madurese people also enjoyed a reputation in the region as skilled seafarers. Madurese residents of large cities, particularly in eastern Surabaya are actively involved in modern economic sectors.

=== Settlements ===
Traditional Madurese settlements are scattered and rarely linear in layout, depending rather on the direction of the roads. In most villages, there are paddocks for cattle rearing. Houses are made of bamboo and often built on low stilts. They have a frame structure, usually supplemented with a veranda. Roofs are covered with palm leaves or reeds; however, from the last third of the 20th century, the usage of roof tiles is increasingly common.

=== Transmigration ===
Low yields on soils had long served the cause of mass migrant labor and the relocation of the local population outside the island, where the Madurese were major clients of the government's large-scale transmigration programmes undertaken by both the Dutch colonial administration as well as the authorities of independent Indonesia in the nineteenth and twentieth centuries, through which they settled in relatively sparsely populated areas of Indonesia's other islands, especially Kalimantan. As a result of this program, more than half of the ethnic Madurese people currently living outside of their customary homeland had settled in many regions of Indonesia, where communities of former transmigrants and their descendants that still maintain their Madurese identity.

Madurese people have lived on the territory of Java for several centuries, forming the ethnic majority in some of the north-eastern regions of the island. They tend to get along well with the Javanese people about language, culture, and way of life. Mixed marriages between Javanese and Madurese people are also common. Moreover, in some areas of eastern Java, there are significant communities of descendants of such pendalungan marriages, which are distinguished by their unique cultural traditions that combine Madurese and Javanese elements to varying degrees.

Another situation often develops in the provinces of West Kalimantan and Central Kalimantan, where Madurese people resettled under the transmigration programmes from 1900 to 1950 in the span of 90 years. Some of these migrant groups have been the subject of conflict with Dayak communities. The native population, especially the Dayaks, were quite wary of strangers and seeing them as a threat to their traditional livelihoods. Mutual distrust also promotes ethnic cultural, and religious differences, where most Dayak people practices Christianity or Kaharingan. The most publicized conflict has been on various localities in Kalimantan, where thousands were killed in a series of large scale armed fighting between the Madurese and the Dayak people during the late 1990s.

In West Kalimantan there was communal violence between Dayaks and Madurese in 1996, in the Sambas conflict in 1999 and the Sampit conflict 2001, resulting in large-scale massacres of Madurese. In the Sambas conflict, both Malays and Dayaks people massacred the Madurese people. Tens of thousands of Madurese people from Kalimantan were forced to move to Madura and Java. By the mid-2000s, the situation has somewhat stabilized and enabled the return of most of the Madurese resettlement back in Kalimantan.

== Culture ==
=== Cuisine ===
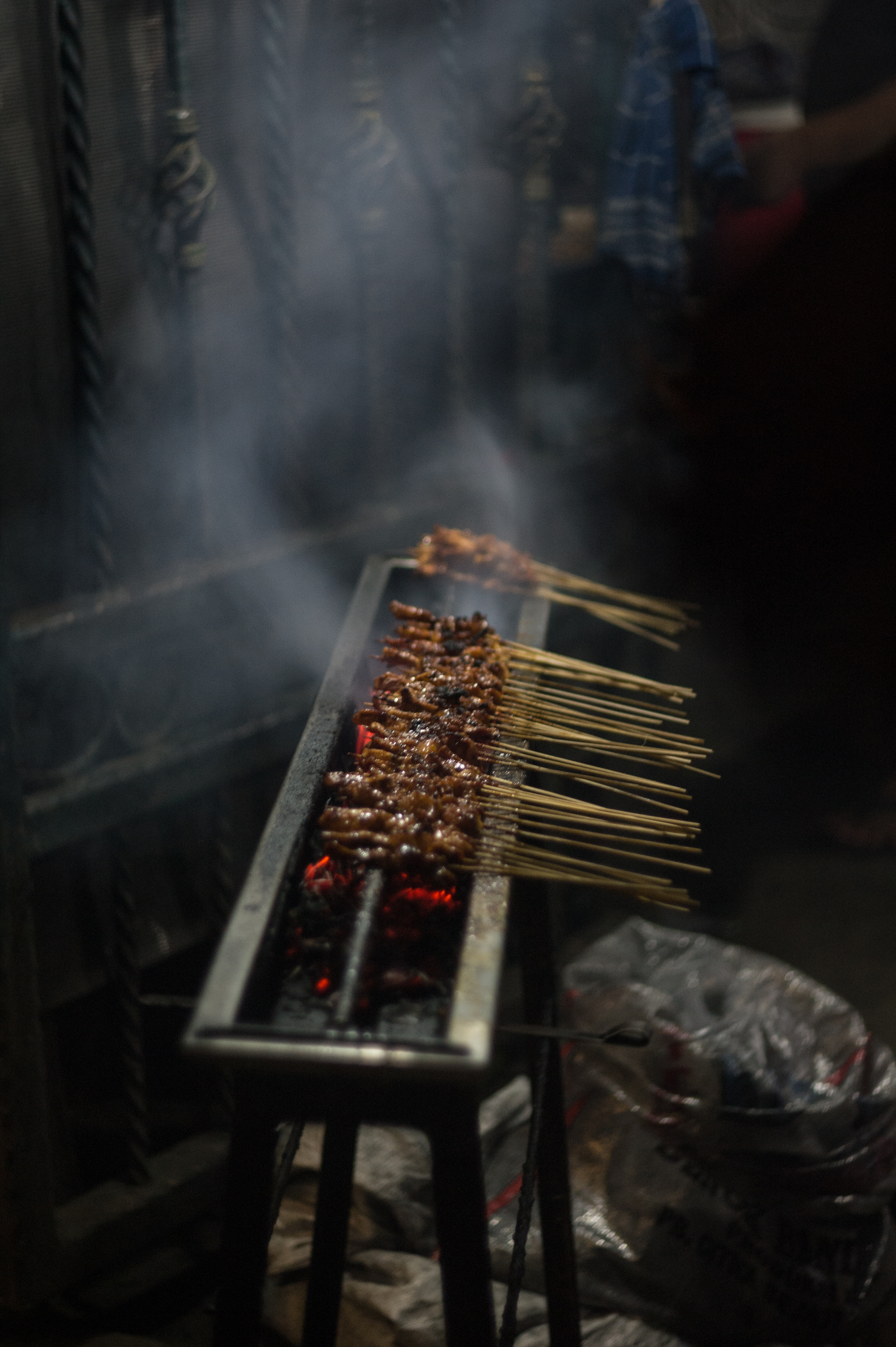
The Madurese satay is distinguished by the sharp sweetness of the marinade.

For the Madurese people, their traditional cuisine is characterized by a fairly large use of meat; of which primarily prepare miniature skewers called satay accompanied with special sweet marinade and thick sharp sauce made from peanut, has enjoyed a wide popularity in many parts of Indonesia. In addition, traditional Madurese cuisine is characterized by the active use of corn and, in general, greater salinity and spiciness of dishes compared to other regional cuisines of the country.

=== Folk art and traditional attire ===
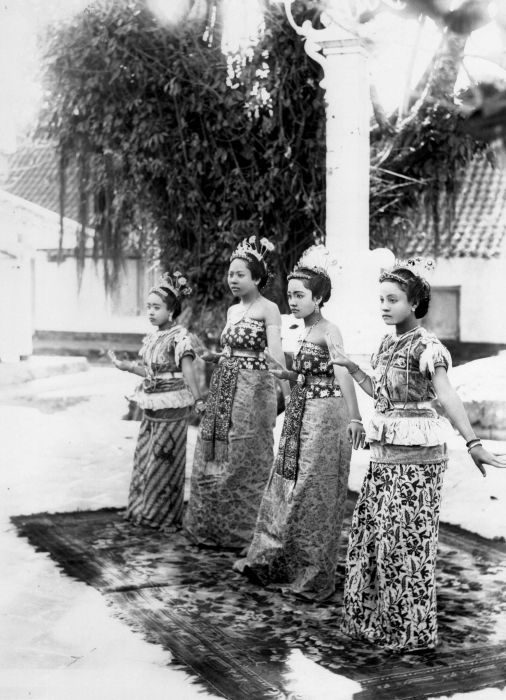
Traditional Madurese dancers, circa 1890–1917

Culturally the Madurese people are close enough to eastern Javanese that they share similar forms of folklore, music (including gamelan), dance, and shadow theater or wayang. The traditional attire, however, is very specific to the Madurese people. Men would wear a completely black long-skirted coat with a wide belt, which most often hooks under a shirt that comes in broad red and white stripes, along with a checkered sarong. While women would have donned a dark blue or mottled jacket over a sarong.

=== Bull racing ===
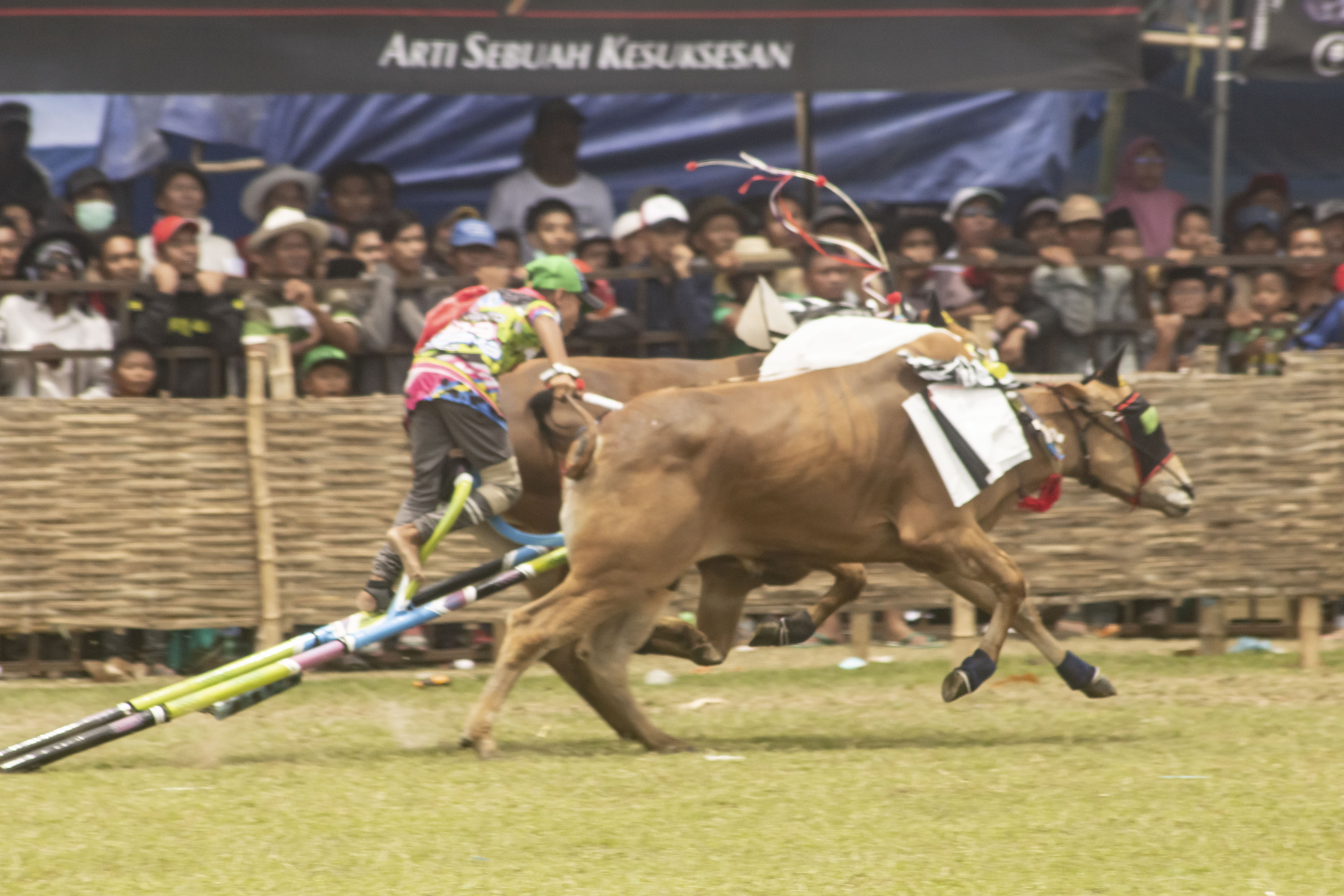
Bull racing (karapan sapi) in Pamekasan, Madura, East Java, Indonesia

A unique tradition of the islanders is bull racing, known as Karapan sapi, where locally bred bulls harnessed in special light carts are led by a charioteer, usually a young man or teenager. Such competitions are typical of Madura, where they serve as its main tourist attraction. Races are held annually in August and October in different localities, after which their winners compete in the final round, which is traditionally held in Pamekasan. Races are usually accompanied by gamelan performances and folk festivities. By the end of the 1980s, the popularity of Madurese bull racing had grown so much that the winner of the competition would be awarded with a prize on behalf of the president of Indonesia. In addition, the scene of the races was depicted on the reverse of coins of 100 Indonesian rupiah, produced from 1991 to 1998.

=== Brawling ===
Traditionally, in terms of the socio-economic life of the Madurese people, there had been a visible impact on their national character. They are often characterized as hard workers, stubborn, courageous, possessing integrity, loyal, generous, fair; and, at the same time, sharpness, resentment, extreme frugality, isolation, arrogant, hot-tempered, prone to violence and distrust towards strangers - especially against the backdrop of kindness and sociability of their neighbors such as the Javanese people. In rural areas, the Madurese still practice an ancient tradition of vendetta, called carok (also spelled charok), which literally means "battle of honor". In the 1990s, law enforcement agencies in each of the four districts in Madura recorded dozens of cases each year. The killing may provoke resentment, quite small by the standards of ordinary European or Indonesian. According to local criminal statistics, most of the reason for such attacks are usually molestation of women or property dispute, but it often happens that the Madurese's cruel revenge is motivated by an insufficiently polite treatment or insult in public places to one's honor. The instrument of revenge used in this dueling is often the traditional Madurese crescent knife, celurit which is the most common peasant weapon and in some areas and also the attribute of traditional male attire. In such cases, the avenger usually prepares the celurit in advance in an event of dueling by casting special spells on the weapon. Sometimes, in the "battle of honor" are involved several people from each side are involved - relatives and friends of the offender and the offended- and then it turns into a bloodbath. Such massive bloodshed has repeatedly occurred in Madura, even in the 21st century. The most famous incident in recent years, a mass carok occurred on 13 July 2006 in Bujur Tengah village, Pamekasan Regency, East Java, Indonesia, resulting stabbing and killing of seven men and seriously injuring nine people.

== Notable people ==
Halim Perdanakusuma, national hero of Indonesia

Bhante Jayamedho Thera, Theravada Buddhist monk who was born in Surabaya

Marissa Haque, Indonesian actress and politician of partial Madurese ancestry

Muhammad Noer, former governor of East Java and former ambassador of Indonesia to France
