= Medang Kamulan =

Javanese semi-mythological kingdom

The Medang Kamulan was a kingdom was established somewhere in Central Java. It is either perceived as the predecessor or the actual historical kingdom of the Medang Kingdom. "Kamulan" is derived from the word mula in Javanese and means 'origin', hence "Medang Kamulan" can be interpreted as 'pre-Medang' or 'Medang the origin'.

== Myths ==
The kingdom is considered by historians and archaeology scholars as semi-mythological, since there is no actual archaeological remnant and historical sources (such as inscriptions) that mentioned about the "Medang Kamulan" kingdom. The name of the kingdom appears in a number of Javanese myths, legends, and folklores; such as the legend of Aji Saka, Dewi Sri, Roro Jonggrang, and in a Javanese wayang story mentioning that Medang Kamulan was the kingdom where Batara Guru ruled and created gamelan. The Roro Jonggrang legend mentioned that the kingdom was ruled by a king named Prabu Gilingwesi.

=== Sundanese tradition ===
The Sundanese tradition recognize this kingdom in their legend as the predecessor of the Galuh Kingdom.

=== The legend of Aji Saka ===
The Aji Saka legend mentioned that the Bledug Kuwu mud volcano in Grobogan Regency was the place where the giant serpent Jaka Linglung appeared before defeating Prabu Dewata Cengkar. Also in the legend, Medang Kamulan was ruled by the evil giant king named Prabu Dewata Cengkar.

=== Bujangga Manik ===
Line 782 and 783 of the second manuscript of the 15th century Bujangga Manik mentioned that after leaving Pulutan (correspond to a village name in west Purwodadi, Central Java) he arrived in "Medang Kamulan". Later after crossing the Wuluyu river, he arrived in Gegelang located south of Medang Kamulan. This manuscript was the first written record that mentioned a place named Medang Kamulan, although at that time it was not a kingdom.

=== Serat Centhini ===
Serat Centhini mentions the location of a Medang Kamulan palace on the north-east of Kasanga mud volcano, which was the place where Jaka Linglung was said to be dead. Jayengresmi found it had become a dense forest while the ruin was nowhere to be seen.

== Possible historical kingdom ==
Van der Meulen suggests, although not quite convinced, that Medang Kamulan refers to "Hasin-Medang-Kuwu-lang-pi-ya" suggested by van Orsoy in his article about the Ho-Ling (Kalingga) kingdom mentioned in Chinese record.

It was possible that the mention of the Medang Kamulan kingdom in several Javanese legends and myths was the remnant of local Javanese collective memory on the existence of an ancient kingdom named "Medang" which was actually corresponded to the historical 8th to 11th century Kingdom of Medang.
