= Java =

Island and region in Indonesia

Native name: Jawa (Indonesian) ꦗꦮ (Javanese) ᮏᮝ (Sundanese) ꦗꦧ (Madurese) Jawè (Betawi)
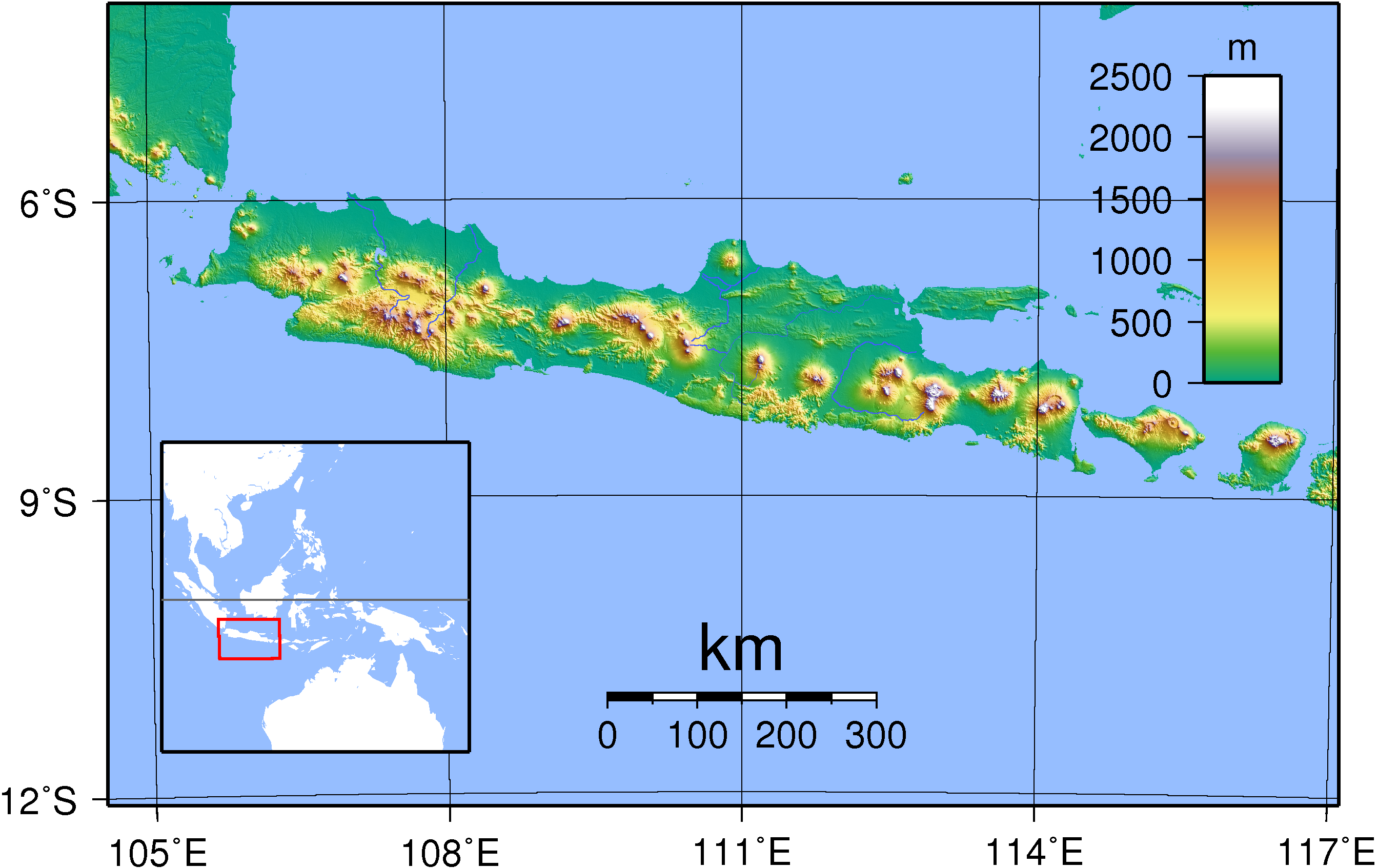
- Topography of Java

Geography
- Location: Southeast Asia
- Coordinates: 7°29′30″S 110°0′16″E
- Archipelago: Indonesian Archipelago Greater Sunda Islands
- Area: 132,644.29 km^{2} (51,214.25 sq mi)
- Area rank: 13th
- Highest elevation: 3,678 m (12067 ft)
- Highest point: Semeru

Administration
- Indonesia
- Provinces: Banten; Jakarta; West Java; Central Java; Special Region of Yogyakarta; East Java
- Largest settlement: Jakarta (pop.10,678,000)

Demographics
- Population: 158,079,100 (mid 2025)
- Pop. density: 1,192/km^{2} (3087/sq mi)
- Ethnic groups: Betawi, Javanese (inc. Cirebonese, Tenggerese, Osing, Banyumasan), Madurese (inc. Bawean, Kangeanese), Malays, Sundanese (inc. Baduy, Bantenese), etc.

Additional information
- Time zone: WIB (UTC+7)

Java (Note: /ˈdʒɑːvə, ˈdʒævə/; Indonesian: Jawa, pronounced [ˈdʒawa]; Javanese: ꦗꦮ; Sundanese: ᮏᮝ; Betawi: Jawè) is one of the Greater Sunda Islands in the South East Asian country of Indonesia. It is bordered by the Indian Ocean to the south and the Java Sea (a part of the Pacific Ocean) to the north. Java is the world's most populous island, home to an estimated 159.2 million people; about 56% of the Indonesian population, while constituting only 7% of the country's land area. Indonesia's capital city, Jakarta, is located on Java's northwestern coast.

Many historic Indonesian events took place on Java. It was the centre of powerful Hindu-Buddhist empires, the Islamic sultanates, and the core of the colonial Dutch East Indies. Java was also the center of the Indonesian struggle for independence during the 1930s and 1940s. Java dominates Indonesia politically, economically, and culturally. Five of Indonesia's ten UNESCO world heritage sites are located in Java: Ujung Kulon National Park, Borobudur Temple, Prambanan Temple, Yogyakarta, and Sangiran Early Man Site.

Java was formed by volcanic eruptions due to geologic subduction of the Australian Plate under the Sunda Plate. It is the 13th largest island in the world and the fifth largest in Indonesia by landmass, at about 132,644.29 square kilometres (51,214.25 mi^{2}) (including Madura's 5,408.35 square kilometres (2,088.18 mi^{2}) and smaller offshore islands). A chain of volcanic mountains forms the east–west spine of the island.

Four main languages are spoken on the island: Javanese, Sundanese, Madurese, and Betawi. Javanese and Sundanese are the most spoken. The ethnic groups native to the island are the Javanese in the central and eastern parts and Sundanese in the western parts. The Madurese in the Eastern salient of Java are migrants from Madura Island (which is part of East Java Province in administrative terms), while the Betawi in the capital city of Jakarta are hybrids from various ethnic groups in Indonesia.

Most residents are bilingual, speaking Indonesian (the official language of Indonesia) as their first or second language. While the majority of the people of Java are Muslim, Java's population comprises people of diverse religious beliefs, ethnicities, and cultures.

Java is divided into four administrative provinces: Banten, West Java, Central Java, and East Java, and two special regions, Jakarta and Yogyakarta.

== Etymology ==
The origins of the name "Java" are not clear. Java may have been named after the jawa (foxtail millet) plant, derived from the Proto-Austronesian root *zawa. The historian Michael Laffan argued that the vernacular form jawa is more likely to have derived from an older form *yaba, based on the directionality of sound changes.

In the early nineteenth century, the British scholar Stamford Raffles suggested that another possible source for Java's name is the word jauh (which he spelled jaú), a Malay word meaning "beyond" or "distant". It has been suggested that another possible root is *awa or *yawa, meaning "home", related to the Polynesian words awaʻi (awaiki) or hawaʻi (hawaiki), but these roots are not universally accepted as Proto-Austronesian. None of these alternative hypotheses has found broad support among scholars, so the jawa (millet) theory remains the generally accepted one.

The toponym Java first appears in foreign literary works around the turn of the Common Era. In Sanskrit texts like the Ramayana, Java is referred to as Yavadvīpa, with dvīpa meaning "island" and yava meaning "barley". Java is mentioned in the ancient Tamil epic Maṇimēkalai (spelled Shavakam) and also in the Pāli scripture Mahāniddesa (likely pre-1st century BCE) as a place to be reached by boats.

The Greek term Iabadiu mentioned in Claudius Ptolemy's Geographia (150 CE), composed during the height of the Roman Empire, possibly derives from a Middle Indo-Aryan language and seems to be a synonym of the Sanskrit Yāvadvīpa.

Chinese sources render the toponym Java, as 葉調 Yèdiào (Late Middle Chinese pronunciation: [jiap dɛwh]) and 耶婆提 Yépótí (Late Middle Chinese pronunciation: [jia ba dɛj]) in the early first millennium CE. Subsequently, there emerged a new Chinese toponym 闍婆 Shépó (Late Middle Chinese pronunciation: [d͡ʑia bwa]), as found in the court chronicles Book of Song (late 5th century) and Book of Liang (7th century). From the Yuan Dynasty (1271–1368) onwards, Java began to be called 爪哇 (Zhǎowā), the present-day name in Mandarin Chinese.

In the later Middle Ages, Muslim writers began to refer to the islands of Indonesia by the term al-Zabaj (Arabic: الزابج). The Arabic usage of the word Zabaj was loose, often incorporating either Sumatra or Java or both. It is the Arabic term Zabaj, rather than the ancient Greek term Iabadiu, that had the greater influence on late medieval Europeans.

== Geography ==
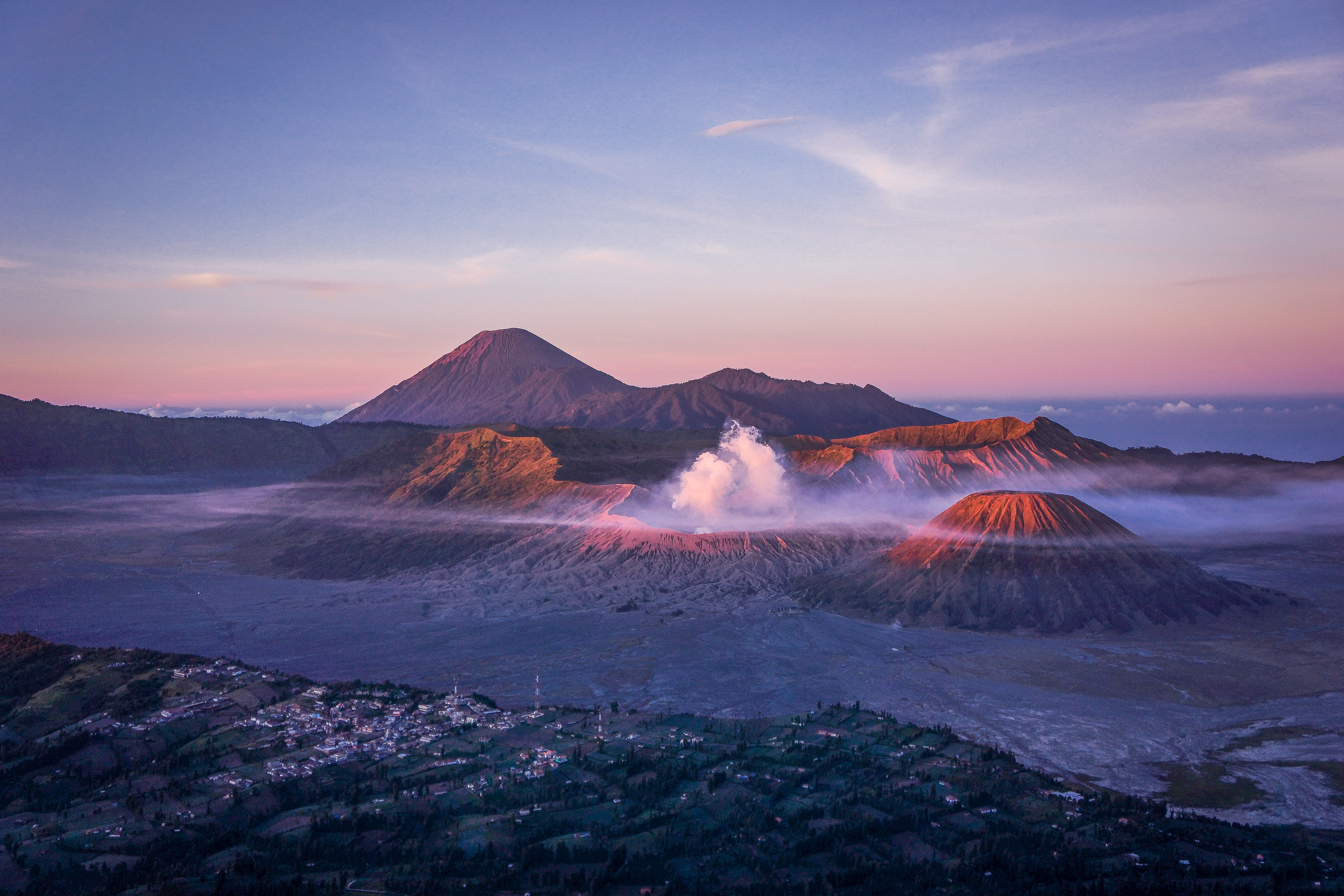
Mount Bromo in Malang, East Java

Java lies between Sumatra to the west and Bali to the east. Borneo lies to the north, and Christmas Island is to the south. It is the world's 13th largest island. Java is surrounded by the Java Sea to the north, the Sunda Strait to the west, the Indian Ocean to the south and Bali Strait and Madura Strait in the east.

Java is almost entirely of volcanic origin; it contains 38 mountains forming an east–west spine that have at one time or another been active volcanoes. There are 112 volcanoes in all, 35 of which are active. The highest volcano in Java is Mount Semeru, 3,676 metres (12,060 ft). The most active volcano in Java and also in Indonesia is Mount Merapi, 2,930 metres (9,610 ft).

Java's mountains and highlands split the interior into a series of relatively isolated regions suitable for wet-rice cultivation; the rice lands of Java are among the richest in the world. Java was the first place where Indonesian coffee was grown, beginning in 1699. Today, coffea arabica is grown on the Ijen Plateau by small-holders and larger plantations.

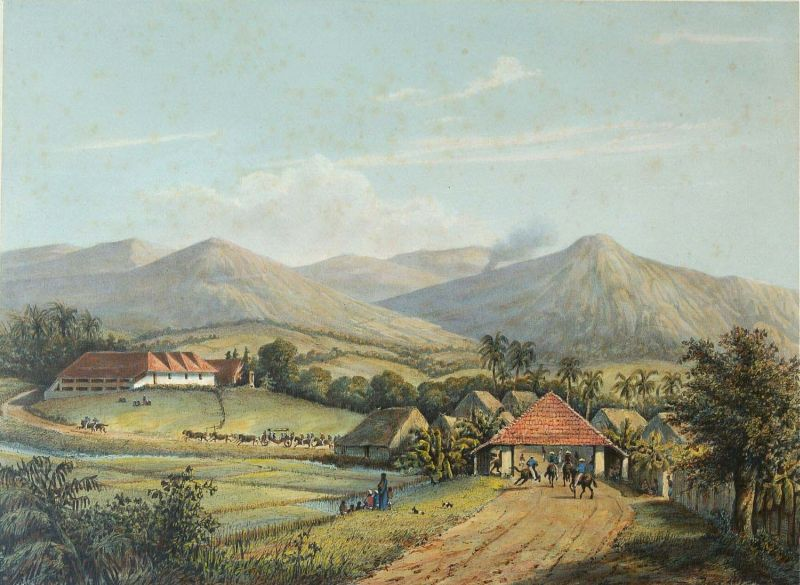
Parahyangan highland near Buitenzorg (now Bogor, West Java), c. 1865–1872

The area of Java is about 132,598.77 square kilometres (51,196.67 mi^{2}) (including Madura's 5,408.45 square kilometres (2,088.21 mi^{2}) and minor offshore islands). It is about 1,000 km (620 mi) long and up to 210 km (130 mi) wide. The island's longest river is the 600 km long Solo River. The river rises from its source in central Java at the Lawu volcano, then flows north and eastward to its mouth in the Java Sea near the city of Surabaya. Other major rivers are Brantas, Citarum, Cimanuk and Serayu.

The average temperature ranges from 22 °C (72 °F) to 29 °C (84 °F); average humidity is 75%. The northern coastal plains are normally hotter, averaging 34 °C (93 °F) during the day in the dry season. The south coast is generally cooler than the north, and highland areas inland are even cooler. The wet season begins in November and ends in April. During that time, rain falls mostly in the afternoons and intermittently during other parts of the year. The wettest months are January and February.

West Java is wetter than East Java, and mountainous regions receive much higher rainfall. The Parahyangan highlands of West Java receive over 4,000 millimetres (160 in) annually, while the north coast of East Java receives 900 millimetres (35 in) annually.

== Natural environment ==
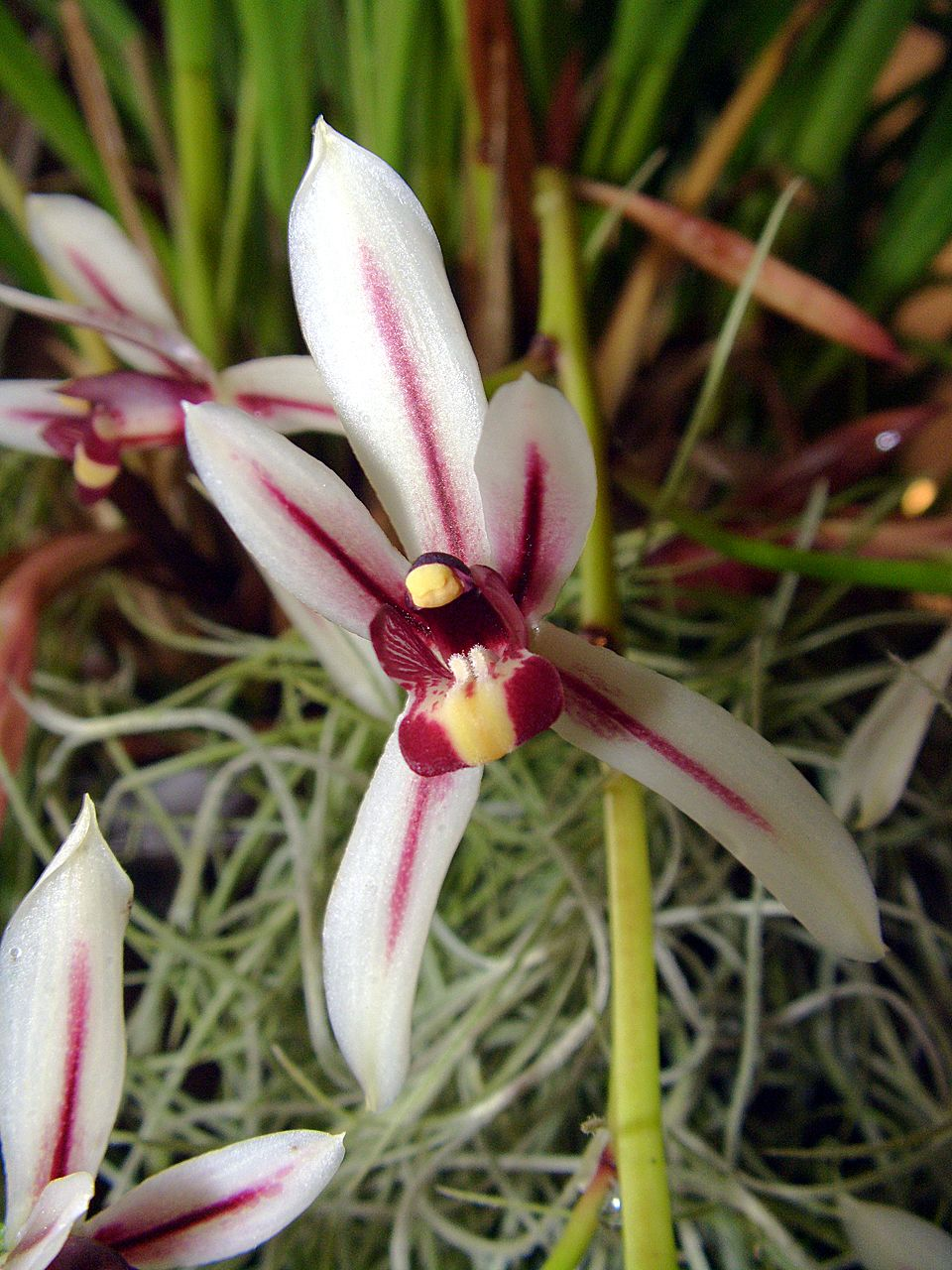
Cymbidium dayanum - typical orchid in Java

Java is an island with a large amount of biodiversity. The natural environment of Java is tropical rainforest, with ecosystems ranging from coastal mangrove forest on the north coast, rocky coastal cliffs on the southern coast, and low-lying tropical forest to high altitude rainforest on the slopes of mountainous volcanic regions in the interior. The Javan environment and climate gradually alters from west to east; from wet and humid dense rainforest in western parts, to a dry savanna environment in the east, corresponding to the climate and rainfall in these regions.

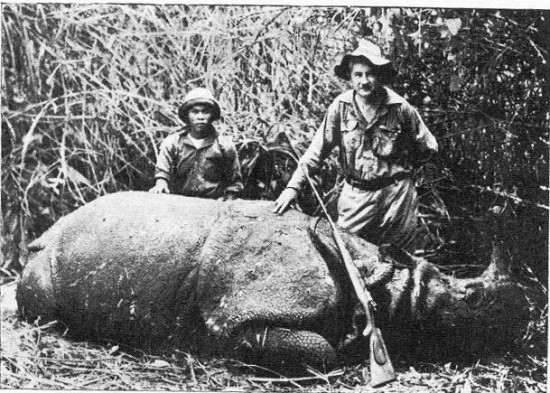
Male Javan rhino shot in 1934 in West Java. Today only small numbers of Javan rhino survive in Ujung Kulon; it is the world's rarest rhino.

Javan wildlife originally supported a rich biodiversity, where numbers of endemic species of flora and fauna flourished; such as the Javan rhinoceros, Javan banteng, Javan warty pig, Javan silvery gibbon, Javan lutung, Java mouse-deer, Javan rusa, and Javan leopard. With over 450 bird species and 37 endemic species including the Javan green magpie, Java sparrow, Javan hawk-eagle, Javan peafowl, and Javan blue-banded kingfisher, Java is a birdwatcher's paradise. There are about 130 freshwater fish species in Java. There are also several endemic amphibian species in Java, including 5 species of tree frogs.

Since ancient times, people have opened the rainforest, altered the ecosystem, shaped the landscapes and created rice paddy and terraces to support the growing population. Javan rice terraces have existed for more than a millennium and had supported ancient agricultural kingdoms. The growing human population has put severe pressure on Java's wildlife, as rainforests were diminished and confined to highland slopes or isolated peninsulas. Some of Java's endemic species are now critically endangered, with some already extinct; Java used to have Javan tigers and Javan elephants, but both have been rendered extinct. Today, several national parks exist in Java that protect the remnants of its fragile wildlife, such as Ujung Kulon, Mount Halimun-Salak, Gede Pangrango, Baluran, Meru Betiri, Bromo Tengger Semeru and Alas Purwo.

Surveys conducted by a team led by EcoVerde Global Consulting on the live bats trade in Java showed an ongoing long-term trade of large fruit bats for traditional medicine in all the major cities including Jakarta, Surabaya, Bekasi, Bandung and Yogyakarta. Hundreds of animals are being offered for sale with higher numbers per capita in economically less affluent areas and more bats in cities with larger Christian populations

== History ==
=== Homo erectus presence ===
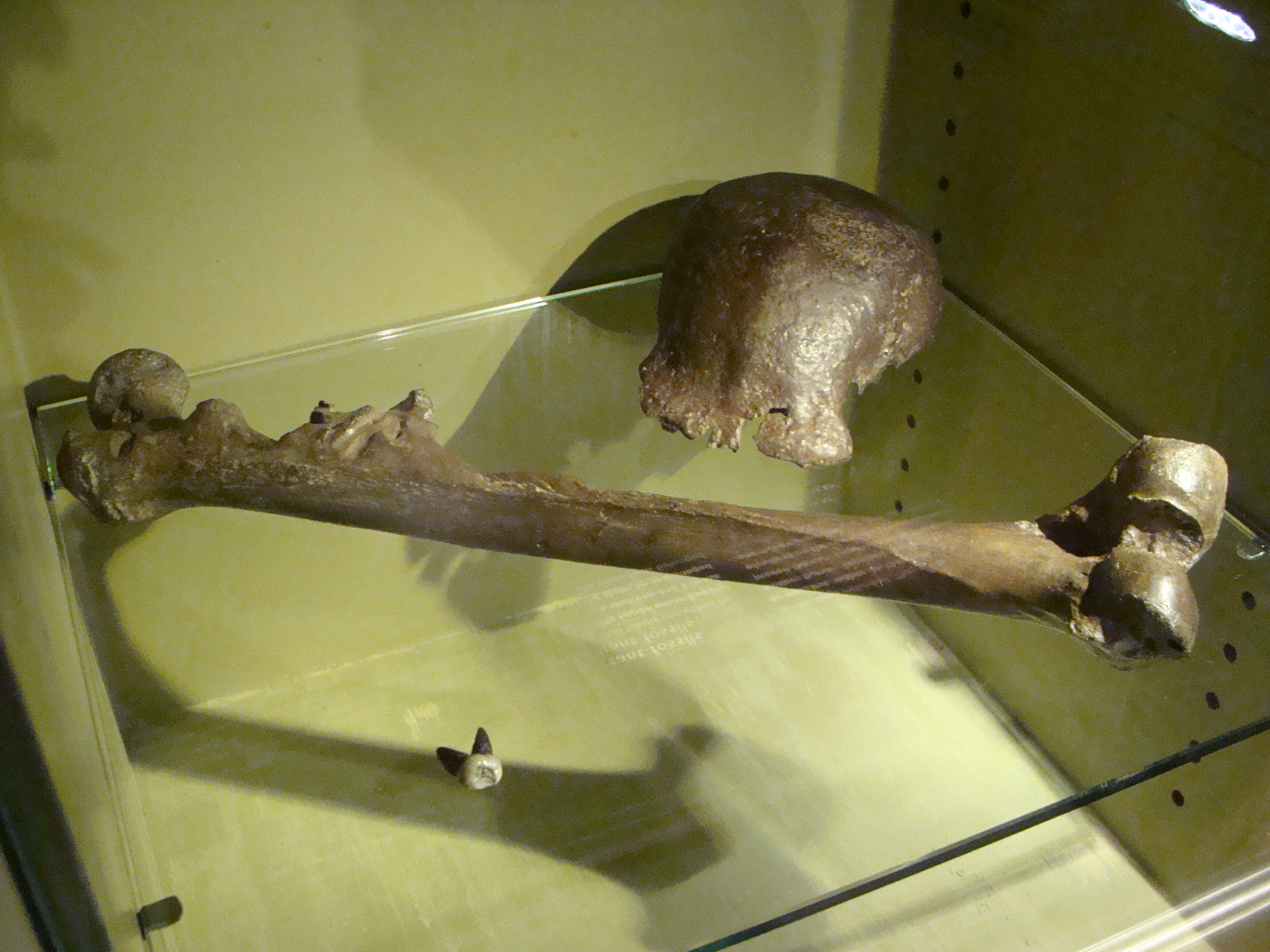
The syntype fossils of Java Man (H. e. erectus), at Naturalis, Leiden

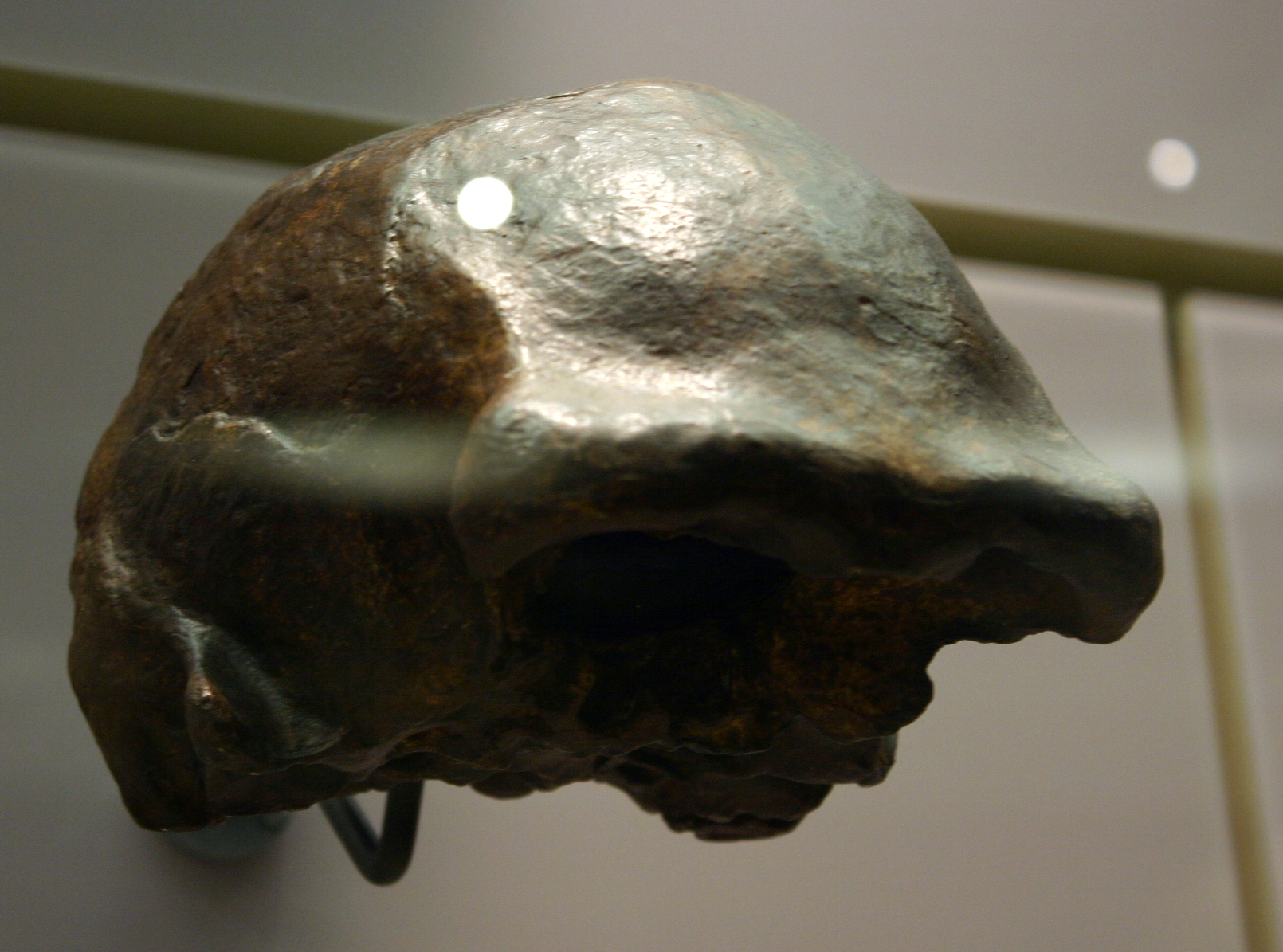
Cast of Skull XI at the Hall of Human Origins, Washington, D.C.

Fossilised remains of Homo erectus, popularly known as the "Java Man", dating back 1.3 million years were found along the banks of the Bengawan Solo River.

H. erectus arrived in Eurasia approximately 1.8 million years ago, in an event considered to be the first African exodus. There is evidence that the Java population of H. erectus lived in an ever-wet forest habitat. More specifically the environment resembled a savannah, but was likely regularly inundated ("hydromorphic savanna"). The plants found at the Trinil excavation site included grass (Poaceae), ferns, Ficus, and Indigofera, which are typical of lowland rainforest.

H. e. soloensis was the last population of a long occupation history of the island of Java by H. erectus, beginning 1.51 to 0.93 million years ago at the Sangiran site, continuing 540 to 430 thousand years ago at the Trinil site, and finally 117 to 108 thousand years ago at Ngandong. If the date is correct for Solo Man, then they would represent a terminal population of H. erectus which sheltered in the last open-habitat refuges of East Asia before the rainforest takeover. Before the immigration of modern humans, Late Pleistocene Southeast Asia was also home to H. floresiensis endemic to the island of Flores, Indonesia, and H. luzonensis endemic to the island of Luzon, the Philippines. Genetic analysis of present-day Southeast Asian populations indicates the widespread dispersal of the Denisovans (a species currently recognisable only by their genetic signature) across Southeast Asia, whereupon they interbred with immigrating modern humans 45.7 and 29.8 thousand years ago. A 2021 genomic study indicates that, aside from the Denisovans, modern humans never interbred with any of these endemic human species, unless the offspring were unviable or the hybrid lineages have since died out.

Judging by the sheer number of specimens deposited at Ngandong at the same time, there may have been a sizeable population of H. e soloensis before the volcanic eruption which resulted in their interment, but population is difficult to approximate with certainty. This site is quite far from the north coast of Java Island, and it is not always easy to determine the position of the coastline in prehistoric times because of significant geographical changes.

The southern coastline and estuary of the Bengawan Solo River at that time may have been different from what it is today, due to geological factors such as sedimentation, erosion, and changes in sea level over time. Currently, the estuary of the Bengawan Solo is in the Java Sea, but in prehistoric times, the river flow and estuary location may have changed. Geological and paleogeographic studies are often used to understand these changes.

=== After the arrival of modern humans ===
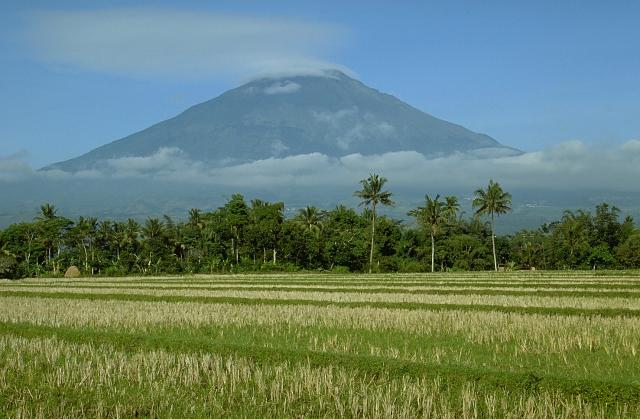
Mount Sumbing surrounded by rice fields. Java's volcanic topography and rich agricultural lands are the fundamental factors in its history.

The island's exceptional fertility and rainfall allowed the development of wet-field rice cultivation, which required sophisticated levels of cooperation between villages. Out of these village alliances, small kingdoms developed. The chain of volcanic mountains and associated highlands running the length of Java kept its interior regions and peoples separate and relatively isolated. Before the advent of Islamic states and European colonialism, the rivers provided the main means of communication, although Java's many rivers are mostly short. Only the Brantas river and Solo river could provide long-distance communication and this way their valleys supported the centers of major kingdoms. A system of roads, permanent bridges, and toll gates is thought to have been established in Java by at least the mid-17th century. Local powers could disrupt the routes as could the wet season and road use was highly dependent on constant maintenance. Consequently, communication between Java's population was difficult.

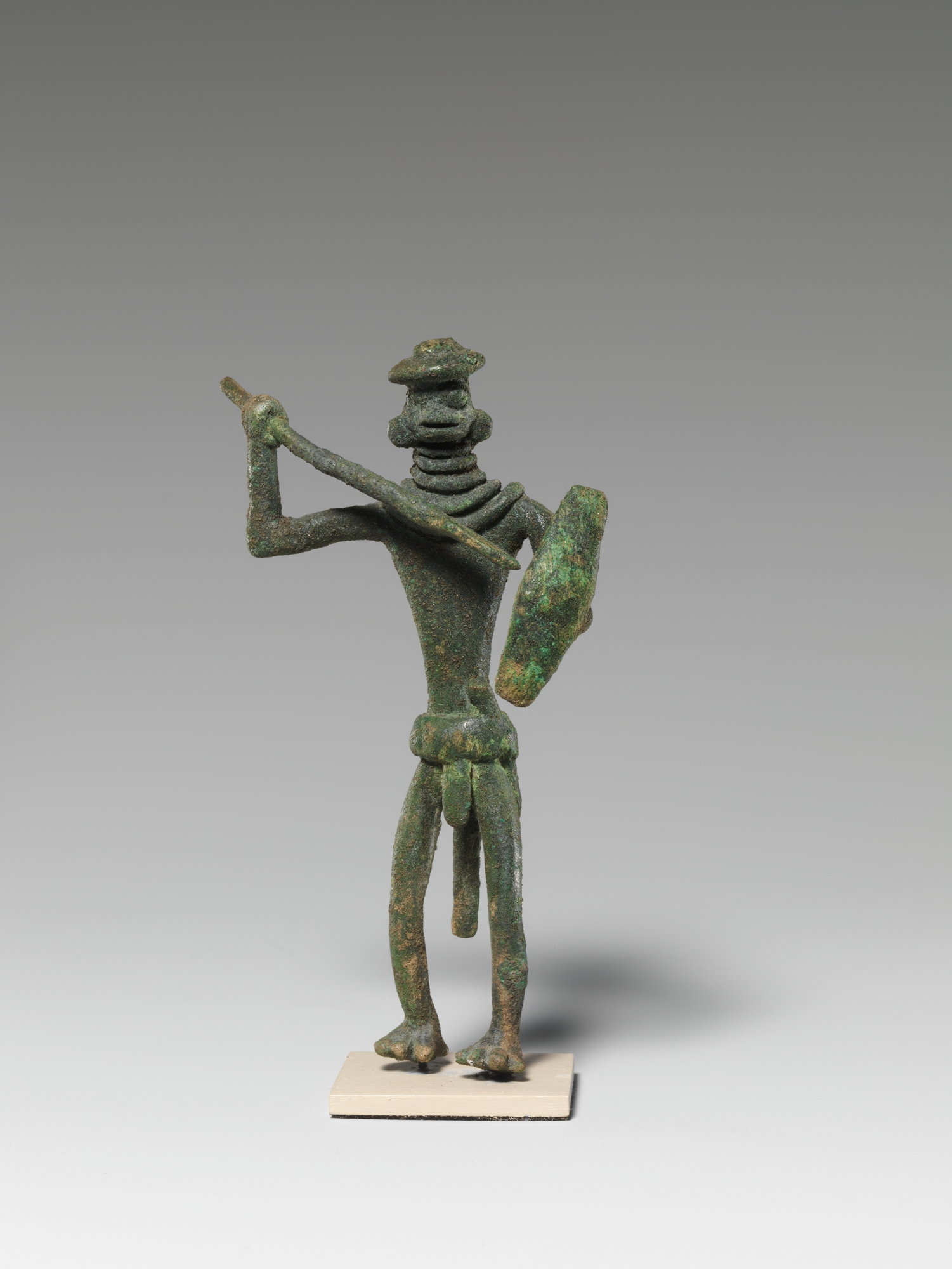
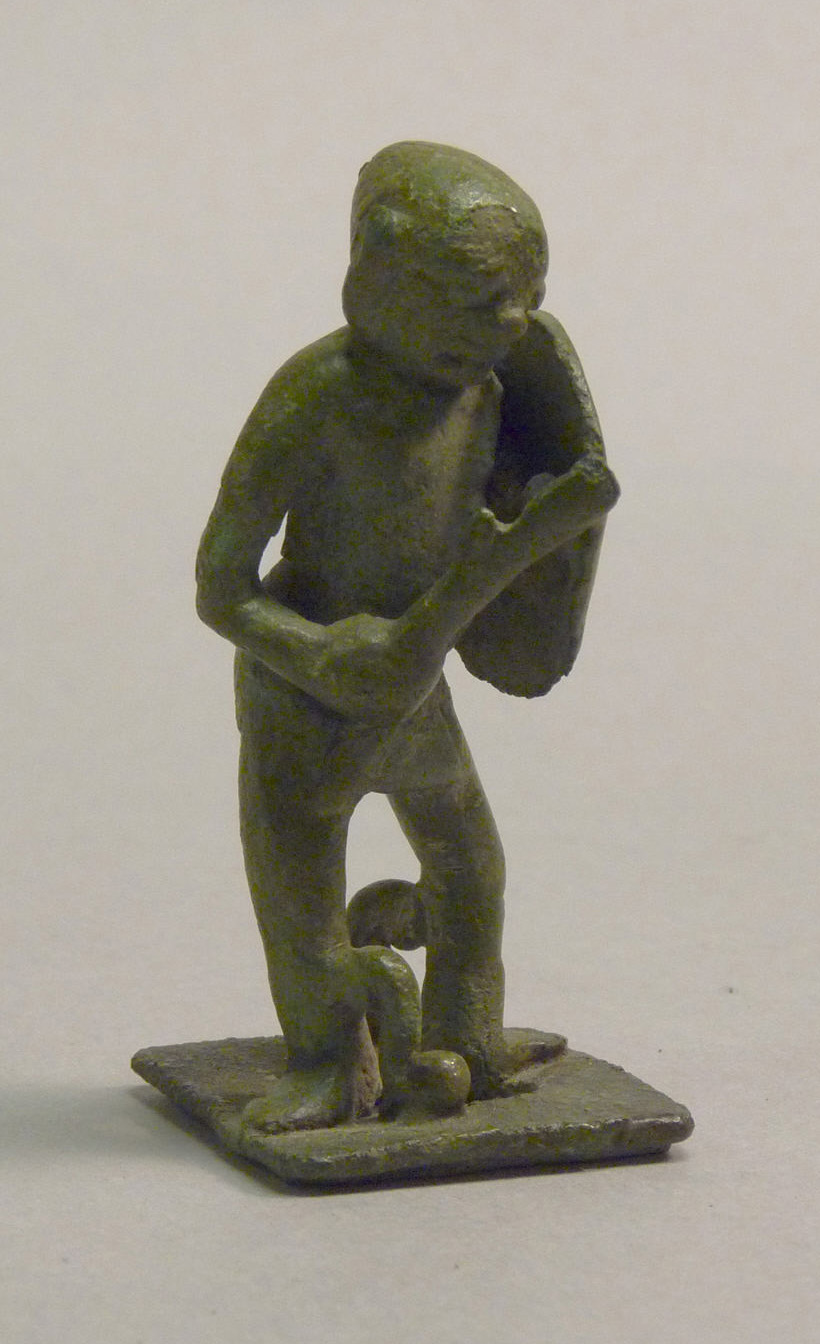
Standing warrior bronze figures, Java, c. 500 BC – 300 AD

According to Javanese legends circulating from the 18th century onwards, the emergence of civilization on the island of Java is associated with the arrival of Aji Saka ("the Saka king") in 78 CE. Aji Saka, as a "mythic founder of the social and religious order", is credited with establishing the key elements of Javanese civilization, such as eliminating demons, establishing the first kingdom, and introducing literacy.

Foreign sources around the beginning of the Common Era (see Names of Java), such as Valmiki's Ramayana, attest to Java's wealth and political organization at that time:

"Yavadvipa is decorated with seven kingdoms, gold and silver islands, rich in gold mines, and there is Śiśira (cold) Mountain that touches the sky with its peak."

The Greek geographer Ptolemy called the island Iabadiu or Sabadibai (Ancient Greek: Ιαβαδίου or Σαβαδίβαι). Ptolemy said that the name meant the "Island of Barley" and produced a lot of grain and gold, adding that its metropolis was called Argyre (Ἀργυρῆ) meaning silver in Greek.

According to Chinese record Míng Shǐ, the Javanese kingdom was founded in 65 BCE.

=== Hindu-Buddhist (Classic) period ===
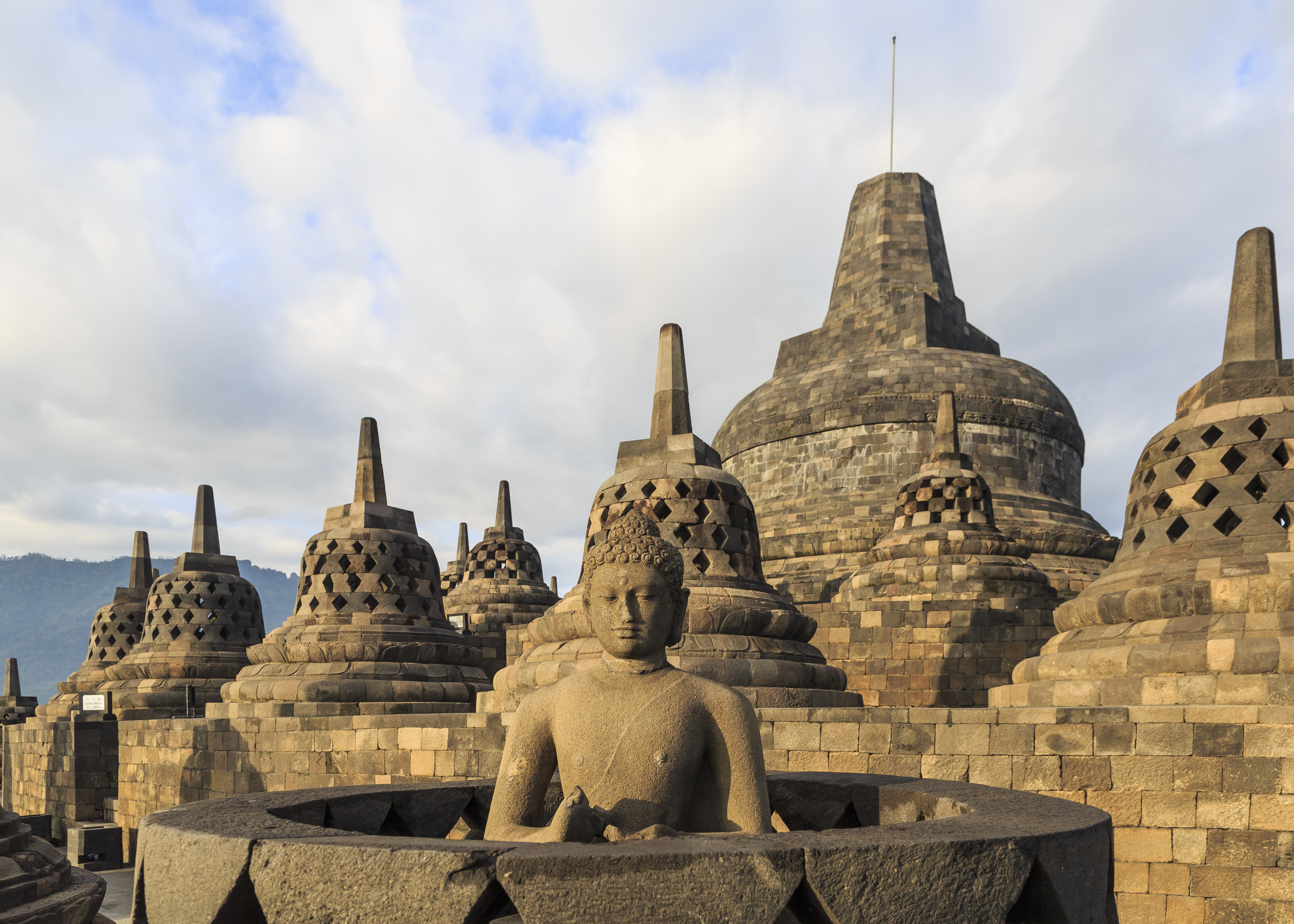
The 9th century Borobudur Buddhist stupa in Central Java

The period between the 5th and 15th century in Java is often referred to as the Hindu-Buddhist period, while in the broader context of Southeast Asia it is also referred to as the Classic period. The Taruma kingdom of western Java existed from the 5th to the 7th centuries, while the Heling kingdom sent embassies to China starting in 640.

The first state to leave a substantial historical record was the Mataram kingdom that was founded in central Java at the beginning of the 8th century. The rulers of Mataram patronised both Hindu and Buddhist institutions, including Java's earliest Hindu temples on the Dieng Plateau. In the second half of the 8th century, these rulers described themselves as members of the Sailendra dynasty, which strongly supported Mahayana Buddhism. Monumental temple complexes such as Borobudur (late 8th century) and Prambanan (mid-9th century) in central Java were constructed at this time.

In the late 920s, the center of power shifted from central to eastern Java. The eastern Javanese kingdoms of Kediri (c. 1100–1222), Singhasari (1222–1292) and Majapahit (1293–c. 1520s) were mainly dependent on rice agriculture, yet also pursued trade within the Indonesian archipelago, and with China and India. Majapahit was established by King Wijaya in 1293, and by the end of the reign of Hayam Wuruk (c. 1390s) it claimed suzerainty over most of the present-day Indonesian archipelago, although its direct control was likely limited to Java, Bali, and Madura. Hayam Wuruk's prime minister, Gajah Mada, led many of the kingdom's territorial conquests. For most of the 15th century, Majapahit continued to be the dominant power in eastern Java. (Note: While early scholars like Krom and Coedes depicted the 15th century as a period of decline for Majapahit, more recent research has shown that the kingdom remained strong until the end of the 15th century.) This last period of Majapahit history coincides with the first emergence of Islamic kingdoms in Java.

=== Spread of Islam and rise of Islamic sultanates ===
Islam gradually became the dominant religion in Java throughout the 16th century. The port-cities of the north coast like Surabaya, Gresik, Demak and Cirebon were the first Javanese polities to adopt Islam, thanks to their interactions with foreign Muslim traders and clerics. Demak was the first Muslim kingdom to achieve a degree of hegemony in Java during the early 16th century, extending the reach of Muslim kingdoms westward to Cirebon and defeating the remnants of the Majapahit kingdom. After the mid-16th century, Demak gave way to other Muslim coastal kingdoms such as Cirebon and Banten in the west, and Surabaya in the east.

At the turn of the 17th century, the inland kingdom of Mataram became the dominant power of central and eastern Java. The rule of Sultan Agung of Mataram (r. 1613–1646) was crucial in establishing military hegemony and a "mystic synthesis" that harmonised Islam with pre-existing Javanese cultural attitudes. The coastal principalities of Surabaya and Cirebon were subjugated in the course of the early 17th century, leaving Mataram and Banten to face the emerging Dutch colonial power in Batavia.

=== Colonial periods ===
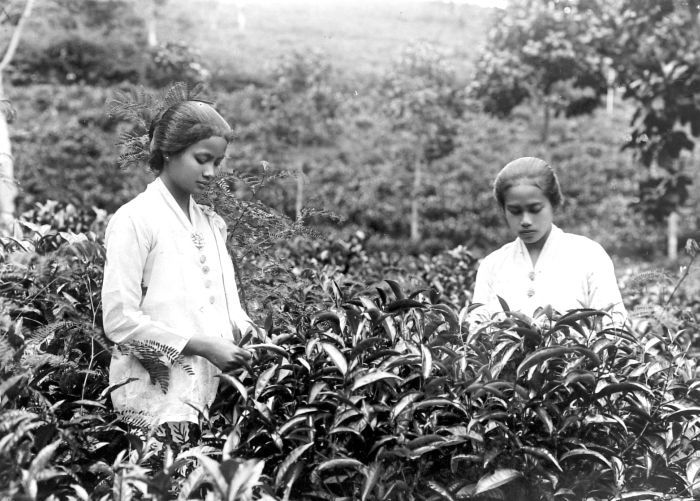
Tea plantation in Java during Dutch colonial period, in or before 1936

Java's contact with the European colonial powers began in 1522 with a treaty between the Sunda kingdom and the Portuguese in Malacca. After its failure, the Portuguese presence was confined to Malacca and to the eastern islands. In 1596, a four-ship expedition led by Cornelis de Houtman was the first Dutch contact with Indonesia. By the end of the 18th century the Dutch had extended their influence over the sultanates of the interior through the Dutch East India Company in Indonesia. The Dutch repeatedly intervened in wars between rival Mataram claimants to the Javanese throne. When the side they supported inevitably won due to their industrialised weapons, the Dutch forced land concessions from the side they supported. The Dutch whittled down the Mataram kingdoms until most of the island was conquered. Internal conflict prevented the Javanese from forming effective alliances against the Dutch. In the 1750s, the Javanese Sultan Mangkubumi tried to restore Mataram's control, but the Dutch divided the kingdom. Remnants of the Mataram survived as the Surakarta (Solo) and Yogyakarta principalities. Javanese kings claimed to rule with divine authority and the Dutch helped them to preserve remnants of a Javanese aristocracy by confirming them as regents or district officials within the colonial administration.

Java's major role during the early part of the colonial period was as a producer of rice. In spice-producing islands like Banda, rice was regularly imported from Java, to supply the deficiency in means of subsistence.

During the Napoleonic Wars in Europe, the Netherlands fell to France, as did its colony in the East Indies. During the short-lived Daendels administration, as French proxy rule on Java, the construction of the Great Post Road was commenced in 1808. The road, spanning from Anyer in Western Java to Panarukan in East Java, served as a military supply route and was used in defending Java from British invasion. In 1811, Java was captured by the British, becoming a possession of the British Empire, and Sir Stamford Raffles was appointed as the island's governor. In 1816, under the governorship of John Fendall, Java was returned to the Dutch by the Treaty of Paris.

In 1815, there may have been five million people in Java. In the second half of the 18th century, population spurts began in districts along the north-central coast of Java, and in the 19th century population grew rapidly across the island. Factors for the great population growth include the impact of Dutch colonial rule including the imposed end to civil war in Java, the increase in the area under rice cultivation, and the introduction of food plants such as cassava and maize that could sustain populations that could not afford rice. Others attribute the growth to the taxation burdens and increased expansion of employment under the Cultivation System to which couples responded by having more children in the hope of increasing their families’ ability to pay tax and buy goods. Cholera claimed 100,000 lives in Java in 1820.

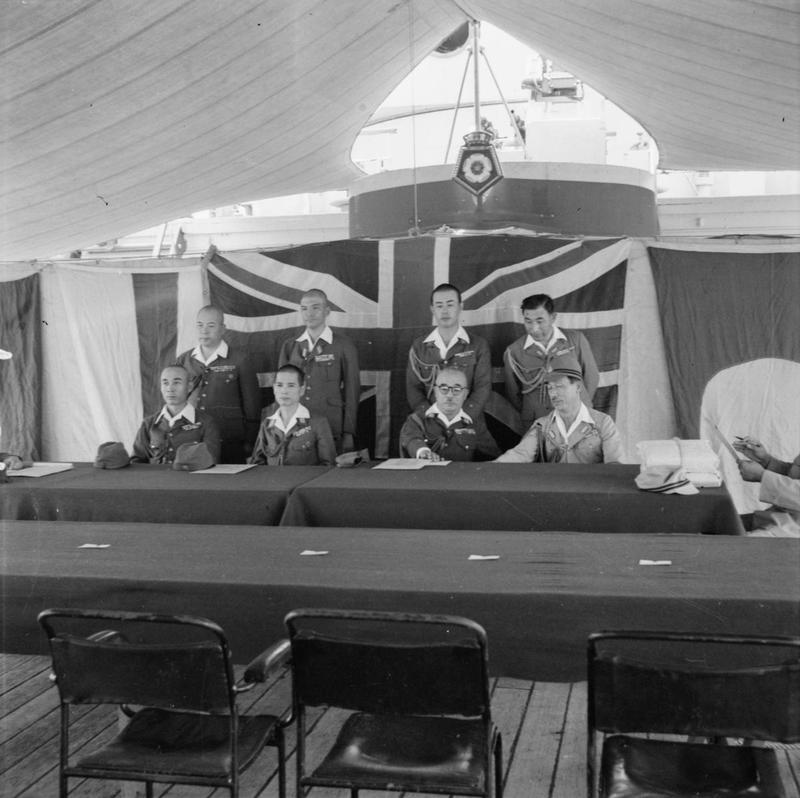
Japanese prepare to discuss surrender terms with British-allied forces in Java, 1945.

The advent of trucks and railways where there had previously only been buffalo and carts, telegraph systems, and more coordinated distribution systems under the colonial government all contributed to famine elimination in Java, and in turn, population growth. There were no significant famines in Java from the 1840s through to the Japanese occupation in the 1940s. However, other sources claimed the Dutch cultivation system was linked to famines and epidemics in the 1840s, first in Cirebon and then in Central Java, as cash crops (indigo, sugar, etc.) were grown instead of rice.

=== Independence ===
Indonesian nationalism first took hold in Java in the early 20th century, and the struggle to secure the country's independence following World War II was centered in Java. In 1949, Indonesian independence was recognized.

== Administration ==

Java is divided into four provinces and two special regions:

- Banten, capital: Serang
- Special Region of Jakarta^{(a)}, capital: Central Jakarta (de facto)
- West Java, capital: Bandung
- Central Java, capital: Semarang
- Special Region of Yogyakarta, capital: Yogyakarta
- East Java, capital: Surabaya (which province also includes Madura Island) and smaller islands).

Province or Special Region	Map	Capital	Area km^{2} ^{(b)}	Area %	Population census 2000	Population census 2010	Population census 2020	Population estimate mid 2025	Population density mid 2025
Banten		Serang	9,355.76	6.88	8,098,277	10,632,166	11,904,562	12,537,400	1,340
Special Region of Jakarta		Central Jakarta (de facto)	661.53	0.50	8,361,079	9,607,787	10,562,088	10,678,000	16,141
West Java		Bandung	37,053.33	27.93	35,724,093	43,053,732	48,274,160	50,759,000	1,370
Western Java (3 areas above)			47,070.62	35.49	52,183,449	63,293,685	70,740,810	73,974,400	1,572
Central Java		Semarang	34,347.43	25.90	31,223,258	32,382,657	36,516,035	38,233,900	1,113
Yogyakarta Special Region		Yogyakarta	3,170.36	2.39	3,121,045	3,457,491	3,668,719	3,781,500	1,193
Central Java Region (2 areas above)			37,517.79	28.29	34,344,303	35,840,148	40,184,754	42,015,400	1,120
East Java (Include Madura Islands)		Surabaya	48,055.88	36.23	34,765,993	37,476,757	40,665,696	42,089,300	876
Total Java Island ^{(c)}		–	127,235.94	95.92	118,063,445	132,987,827	147,586,696	153,922,439	1,210
Madura Island ^{(d)}		–	5,408.35	4.08	3,230,300	3,622,763	4,004,564	4,156,661	769
Region Administered as Java		Jakarta	132,644.29	100%	121,293,745	136,610,590	151,591,260	158,079,100	1,192

Notes: (a) called Special Capital Region until 30 November 2024, when the word "capital" was dropped from the title, although de facto Jakarta still retains capital functions.
(b) Land area of provinces updated in mid 2025 regency/city annual statistics.
(c) Other offshore islands are included in this figure, but are comparatively very small in population and area; they include Nusa Barong (84.73 km^{2}), Bawean (197.42 km^{2}), Karimunjawa (78 km^{2}), Nusa Kambangan (121 km^{2}), Panaitan (170 km^{2}), and the Thousand Islands (8.7 km^{2}) – with a combined population of roughly 150,000 (of whom 85,320 are on Bawean, 28,809 are on the Thousand Islands, 16,200 on Nusa Barong and 10,800 on Karimunjawa).
(d) including the neighbouring small archipelagos of the Kangean Islands (648.55 km^{2}), the Sapudi Islands (167.41 km^{2}), Talango Island (50.278 km^{2}), Masalembu (40.85 km^{2}), the Giligenteng Islands (30.32 km^{2}) - all the foregoing within Sumenep Regency.

== Demographics ==
=== Demographic profile ===
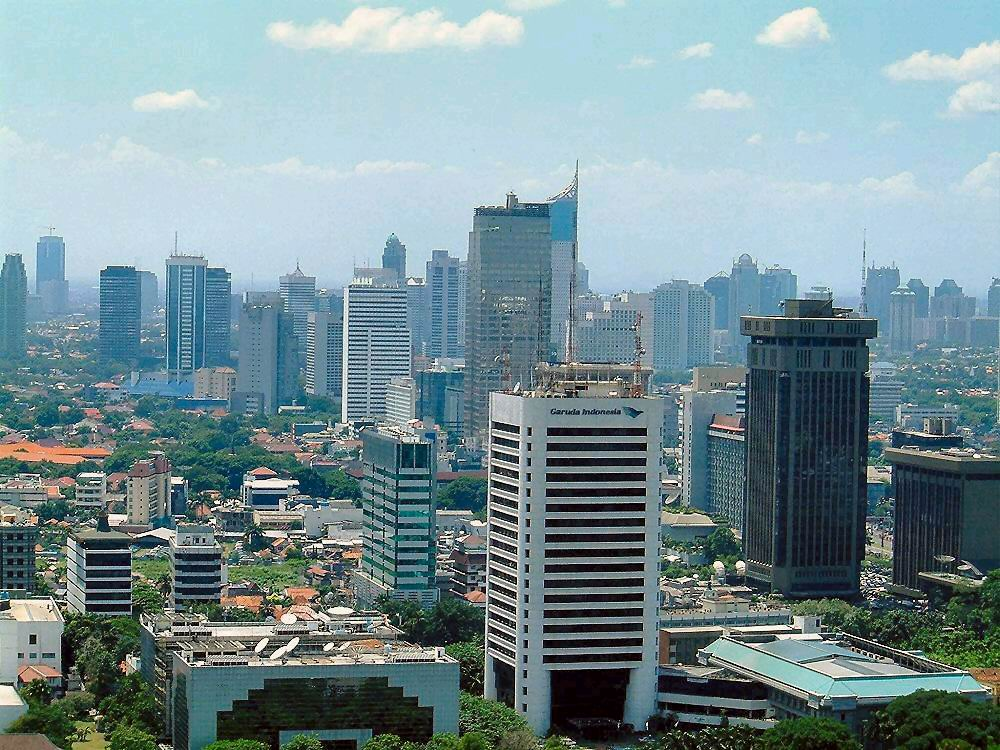
Jakarta, the capital of Indonesia

Historical population
Year	Pop.	±%
1961	63,059,575	—
1971	76,086,320	+20.7%
1980	91,269,528	+20.0%
1990	107,581,306	+17.9%
2000	121,352,608	+12.8%
2010	136,610,590	+12.6%
2015	145,013,583	+6.2%
2020	151,591,262	+4.5%
2025	158,079,100	+4.3%
Refers to the administrative region (including Madura). Source:

Java has been traditionally dominated by an elite class, while the people in the lower classes were often involved in agriculture and fishing. The elite class in Java has evolved over the course of history, as cultural wave after cultural wave immigrated to the island. There is evidence that South Asian emigres were among this elite, as well as Arabian and Persian immigrants during the Islamic eras. More recently, Chinese immigrants have also become part of the economic elite of Java. Although politically the Chinese generally remain sidelined, there are notable exceptions, such as the former governor of Jakarta, Basuki Tjahaja Purnama. Java houses the majority of Indonesia's urban population. Currently, 65% of the island is urbanized. Unlike the rest of Java, the population growth in Central Java remains low. Central Java however has a younger population than the national average. The slow population growth can in part be attributed to the choice by many people to leave the more rural Central Java for better opportunities and higher incomes in the bigger cities. Java's population continues to rapidly increase despite many Javanese leaving the island. This is somewhat due to the fact that Java is the business, academic, and cultural hub of Indonesia, which attracts millions of non-Javanese people to its cities. The population growth is most intense in the regions surrounding Jakarta and Bandung, which is reflected through the demographic diversity in those areas.

=== Population growth ===
Population density of Java and Madura by subdistrict as of 2022, with major urban areas shown

Java is the most populous island in the world and is home to an estimated 159.2 million people; about 56% of Indonesia's total population. At about 1,192 people per km^{2} in 2025, it is also one of the most densely populated parts of the world, on a par with Bangladesh. Every region of the island has numerous volcanoes, with the people left to share the remaining flatter land. Because of this, many coasts are heavily populated and cities ring around the valleys surrounding volcanic peaks.

The population growth rate more than doubled in economically depressed Central Java in the latest 2010–2020 period vs 2000–2010, indicative of migration or other issues; there were significant volcanic eruptions during the earlier period. Approximately 45% of the population of Indonesia is ethnically Javanese, while Sundanese make a large portion of Java's population as well.

The western third of the island (West Java, Banten, and DKI Jakarta) has an even higher population density, of roughly 1,572 per square kilometre and accounts for most of the population growth of Java. It is home to three metropolitan areas, Greater Jakarta (with outlying areas of Greater Serang and Greater Sukabumi), Greater Bandung, and Greater Cirebon.

From the 1970s to the fall of the Suharto regime in 1998, the Indonesian government ran transmigration programs aimed at resettling the population of Java on other less populated islands of Indonesia. This program has met with mixed results, sometimes causing conflicts between the locals and the recently arrived settlers. Nevertheless, it has caused Java's share of the nation's population to progressively decline.

Jakarta and its outskirts, being the dominant metropolis, is also home to people from all over the nation. East Java is also home to ethnic Balinese, as well as large numbers of Madurans due to their historic poverty.

=== Ethnicity and culture ===
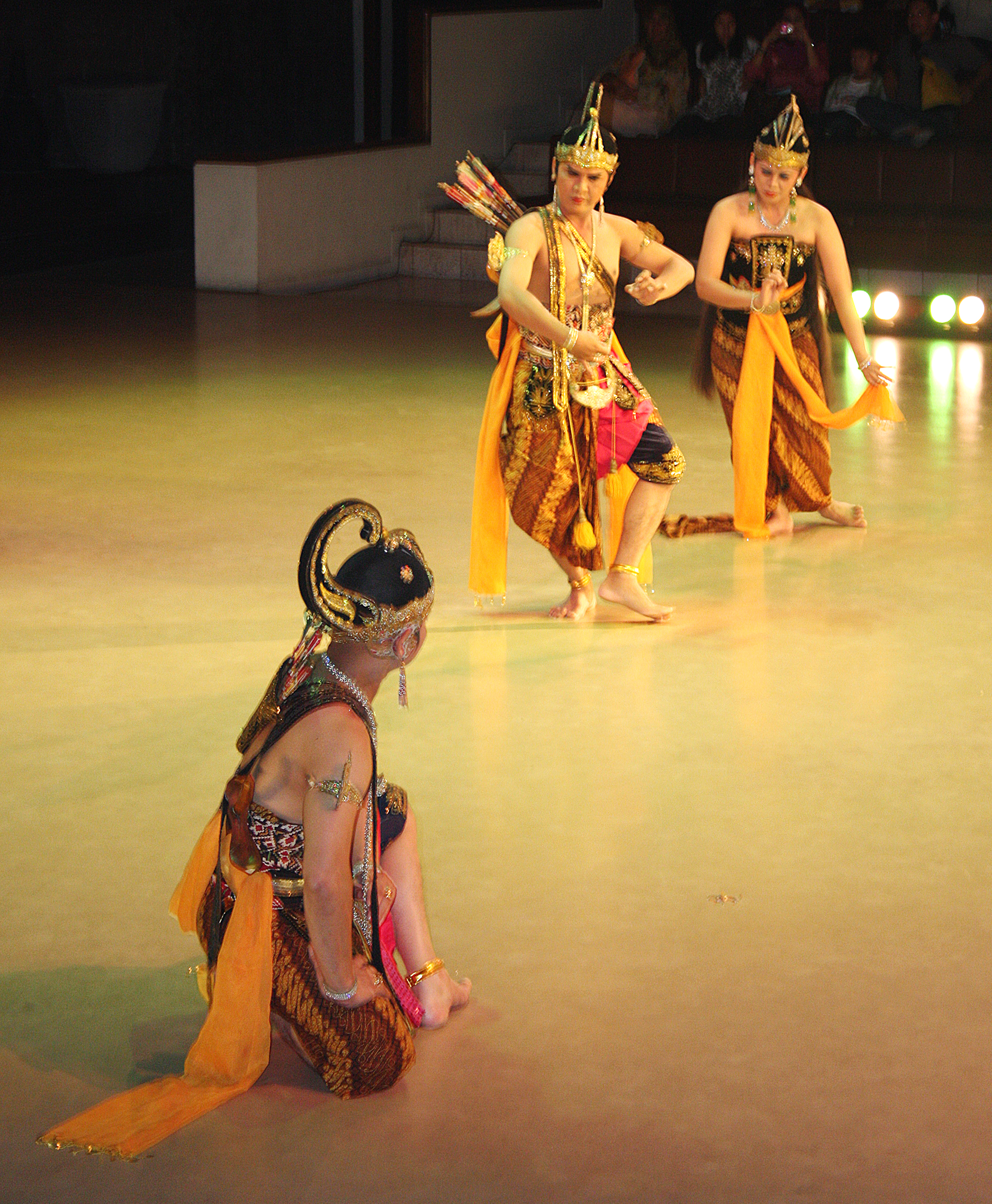
Lakshmana, Rama and Shinta in Ramayana ballet at Prambanan, Java

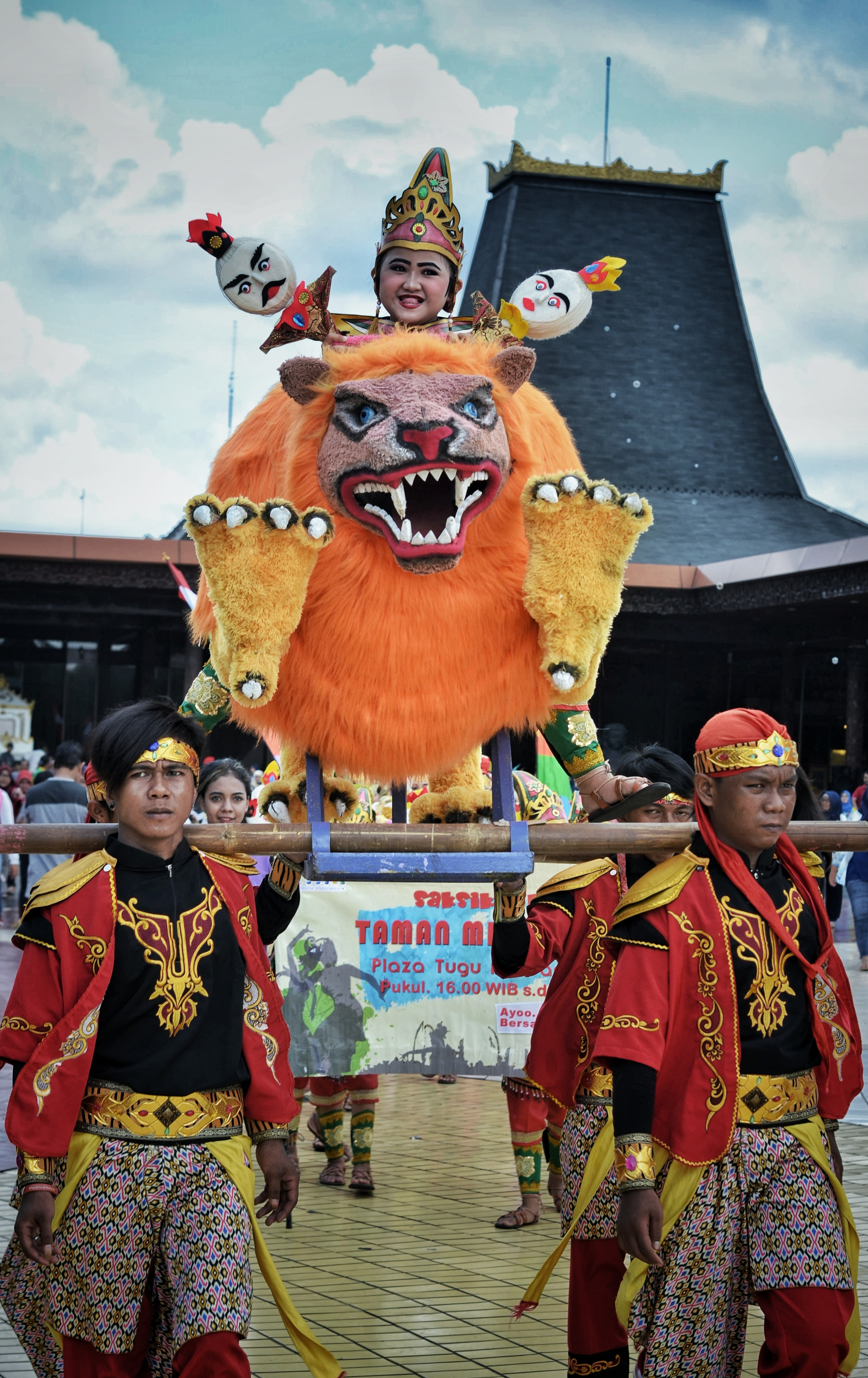
Sisingaan attractions, featuring traditional Sundanese lion dance

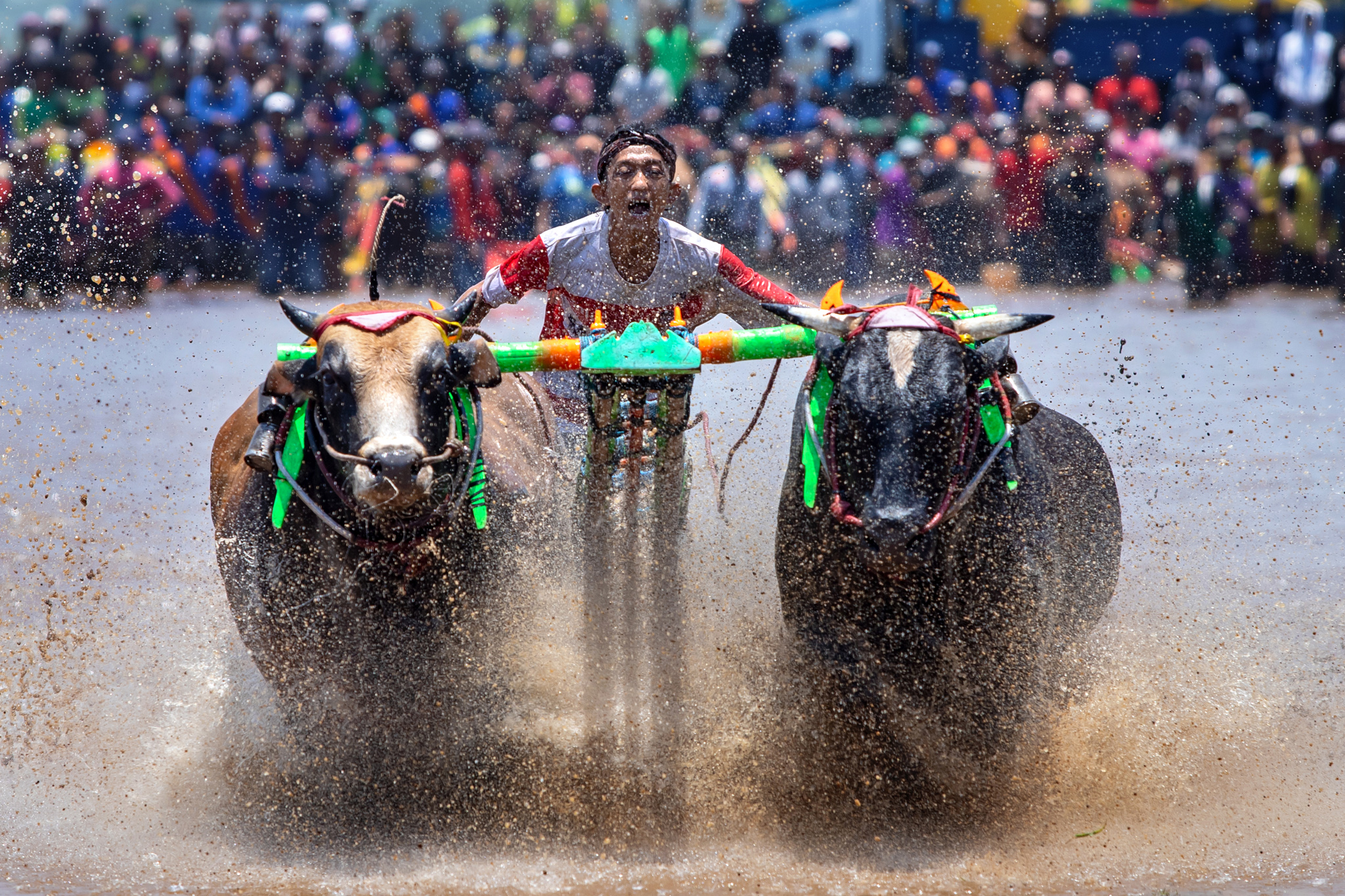
Karapan sapi is a Madurese traditional bull racing festival.

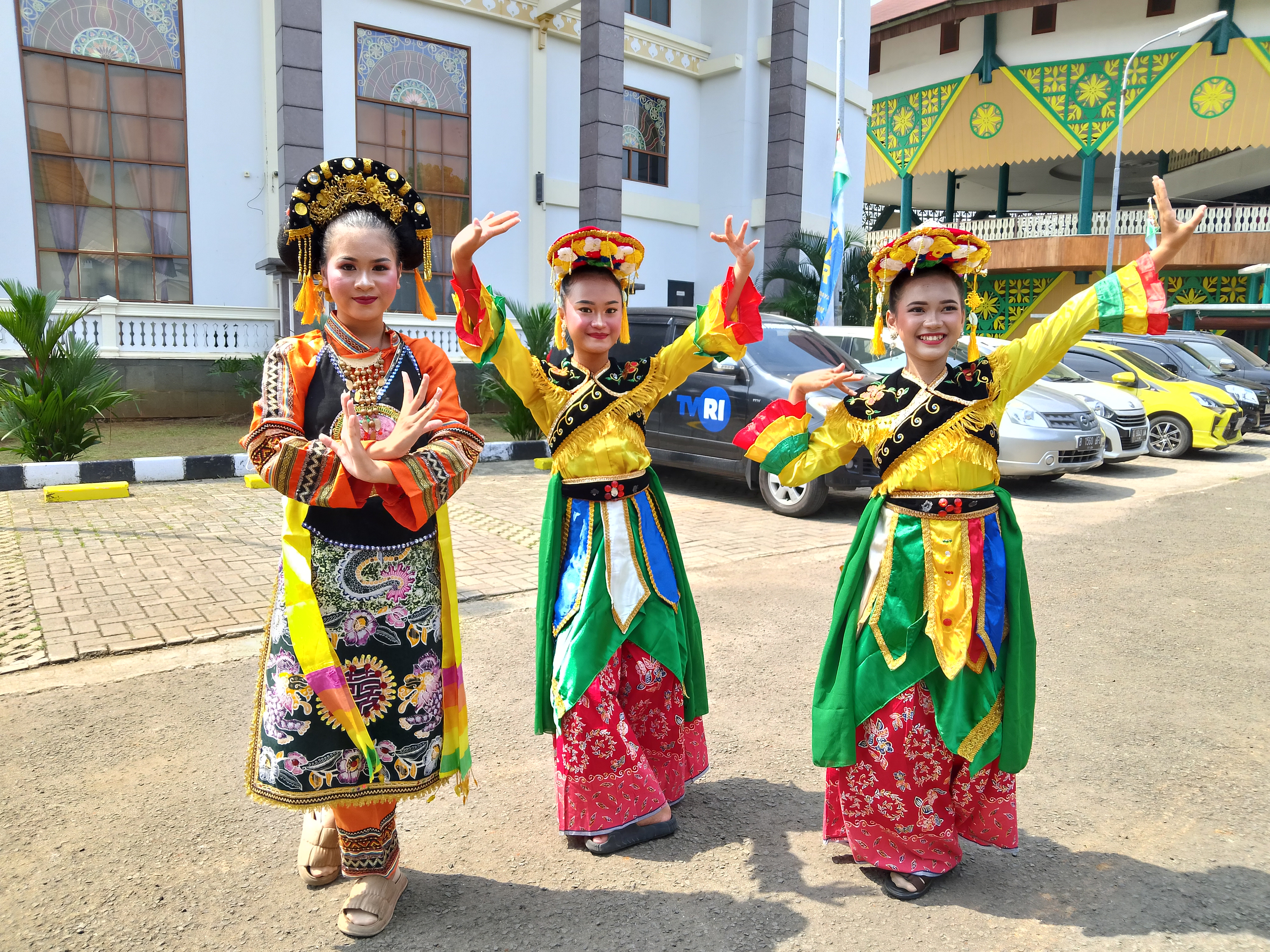
Betawi girl dancers

Despite its large population and in contrast to the other larger islands of Indonesia, Java is comparatively homogeneous in ethnic composition. Only two ethnic groups are native to the island—the Javanese and Sundanese. A third group is the Madurese, who inhabit the island of Madura off the northeast coast of Java and have immigrated to East Java in large numbers since the 18th century. The Javanese comprise about two-thirds of the island's population while the Sundanese and Madurese account for 38% and 10% respectively. The fourth group is the Betawi people who speak a dialect of Malay. They are the descendants of the people living around Batavia from around the 17th century. Betawis are creole people, mostly descended from various Indonesian archipelago ethnic groups such as Malay, Sundanese, Javanese, Balinese, Minang, Bugis, Makassar, Ambonese, mixed with foreign ethnic groups such as Portuguese, Dutch, Arab, Chinese and Indian brought to or attracted to Batavia to meet labour needs. They have a culture and language distinct from the surrounding Sundanese and Javanese.

The Javanese prose text Tantu Pagelaran (c. 15th century) explained the mythical origin of the island and its volcanic nature.

Four major cultural areas exist on the island:

1. The heartland of the Javanese people in the central part of Java with Yogyakarta as its cultural center;
2. the Pasisir region (from Javanese: ꦥꦱꦶꦱꦶꦂ, lit. 'shore, coast') on the northern coast, home to the first Muslim sultanate in Indonesia;
3. the Sunda lands (Sundanese: ᮒᮒᮁ ᮞᮥᮔ᮪ᮓ, Tatar Sunda) in the western part of Java with Parahyangan as their heartland;
4. the eastern salient of Java, also known as Blambangan, consisting of the Blambangan Peninsula east of the Tengger Massif.

Madura makes up a fifth area having close cultural ties with coastal eastern Java.

The kejawen of Javanese culture is the island's most dominant. Java's remaining aristocracy is based here, and it is the region from where the majority of Indonesia's army, business, and political elite originate. Its language, arts, and etiquette are regarded as the island's most refined and exemplary. The territory from Banyumas in the west through to Blitar in the east encompasses Indonesia's most fertile and densely populated agricultural land.

In the southwestern part of Central Java, which is usually named the Banyumasan region, a cultural mingling occurred, bringing together Javanese culture and Sundanese culture to create the Banyumasan culture. In the central Javanese court cities of Yogyakarta and Surakarta, contemporary kings trace their lineages back to the pre-colonial Islamic kingdoms that ruled the region, making those places especially strong repositories of classical Javanese culture. Classic arts of Java include gamelan music and wayang puppet shows.

Java was the site of many influential kingdoms in the Southeast Asian region, and as a result, many literary works have been written by Javanese authors. These include Ken Arok and Ken Dedes, the story of the orphan who usurped his king, and married the queen of the ancient Javanese kingdom; and translations of Ramayana and Mahabharata. Pramoedya Ananta Toer is a famous contemporary Indonesian author who has written many stories based on his own experiences of having grown up in Java and takes many elements from Javanese folklore and historical legends.

=== Languages ===
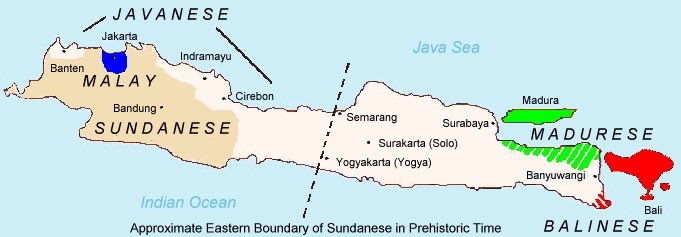
Languages spoken in Java (Javanese is shown in white). "Malay" refers to Betawi, the local dialect as one of Malay creole dialect.

The three major languages spoken on Java are Javanese, Sundanese and Madurese. Other languages spoken include Betawi (a Malay dialect local to the Jakarta region), Osing, Banyumasan, and Tenggerese (closely related to Javanese), Baduy and Bantenese (closely related to Sundanese), Kangeanese (closely related to Madurese), and Balinese. The vast majority of the population also speaks Indonesian, often as a second language.

=== Religion ===
Religion in Java (2023)
1. Islam (96.1%)
2. Protestantism (2.26%)
3. Roman Catholicism (1.07%)
4. Buddhism (0.48%)
5. Hinduism (0.11%)
6. Aliran Kepercayaan (0.01%)
7. Confucianism (0.01%)

Hinduism was the main religion in Java before the arrival of Islam. Indian influences came first with Shaivism and Buddhism penetrating deeply into society, blending with indigenous tradition and culture. One conduit for this were the ascetics, called resi, who taught mystical practices. A resi lived surrounded by students, who took care of their master's daily needs. Resi's authorities were merely ceremonial. At the courts, Brahmin clerics and pudjangga (sacred literati) legitimised rulers and linked Hindu cosmology to their political needs. Small Hindu enclaves are scattered throughout Java, but there is a large Hindu population along the eastern coast nearest Bali, especially around the town of Banyuwangi.

Religions	Total
Islam	151,001,350
Protestantism	3,551,176
Roman Catholicism	1,677,824
Buddhism	755,560
Hinduism	168,055
Aliran Kepercayaan	21,855
Confucianism	20,303
Overall	157,196,123

Islam strengthened the role of religion in structuring society. More than 98 percent of the Muslims in Java are Sunni with a tiny minority being Shia and Ahmadi (respectively 1% and 0.2%), on a broad continuum between abangan (more syncretic) and santri (more orthodox). Muslim scholars (Kyai) became the new religious elite as Hindu influences receded. Islam recognises no hierarchy of religious leaders nor a formal priesthood, but the Dutch colonial government established an elaborate rank order for mosque and other Islamic preaching schools. In Javanese pesantren (Islamic schools), the Kyai perpetuated the tradition of the resi. Students around him provided his needs, even peasants around the school.

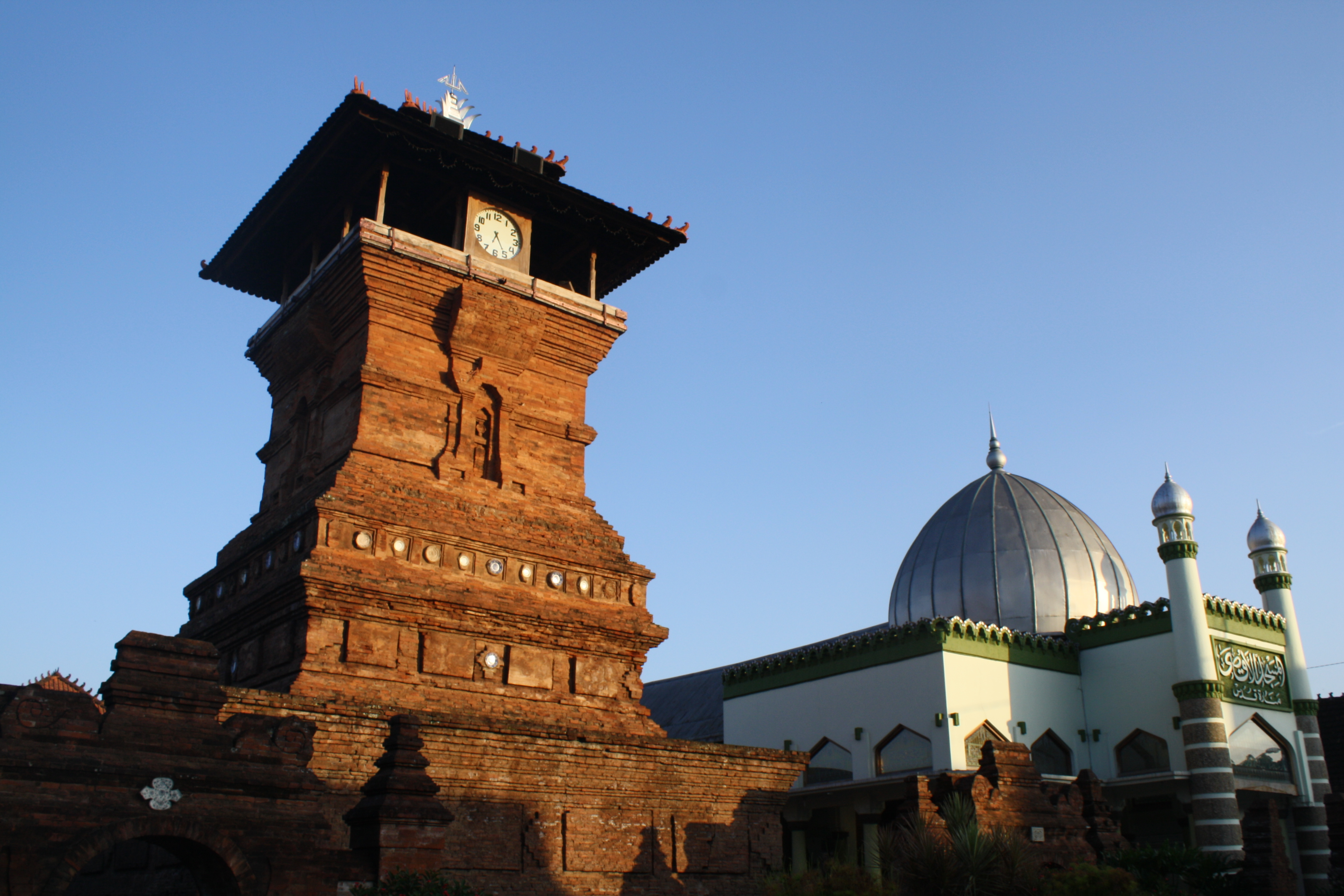
The Menara Kudus Mosque in Kudus, built in a mix of traditional Islamic and old Javanese styles

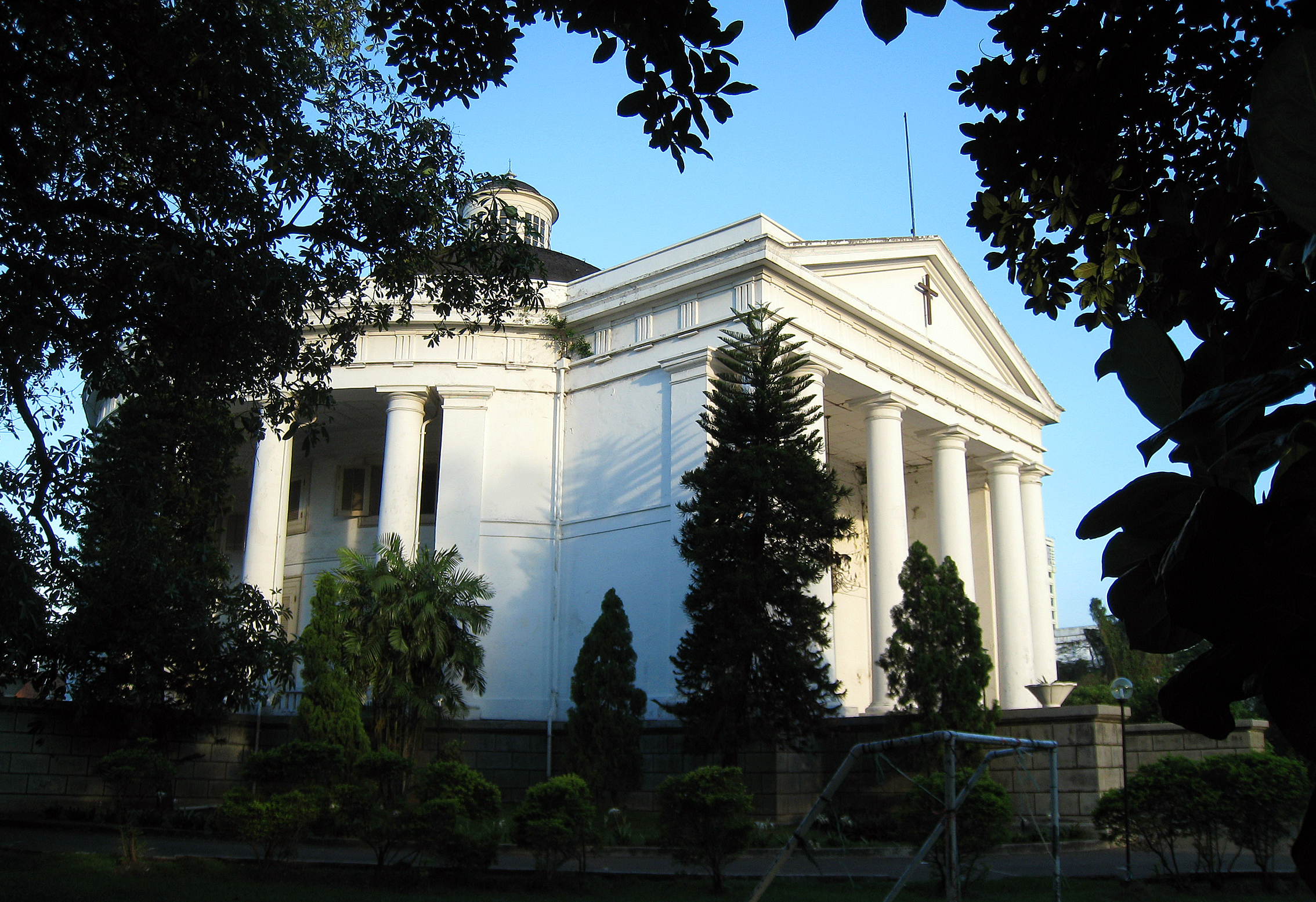
Immanuel Church a Protestant church in Jakarta

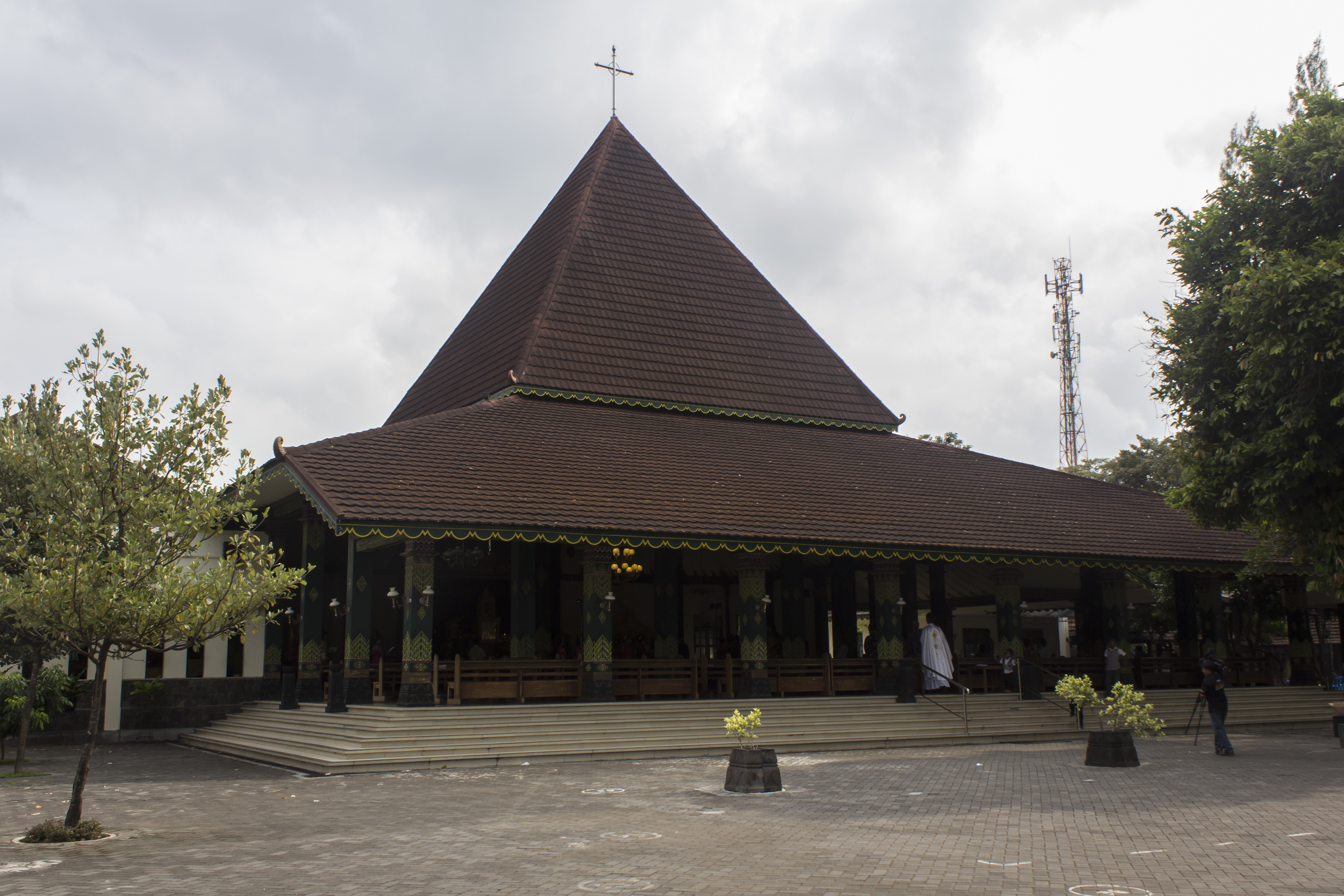
Ganjuran Roman Catholic church in Bantul Regency, built in the traditional Javanese style

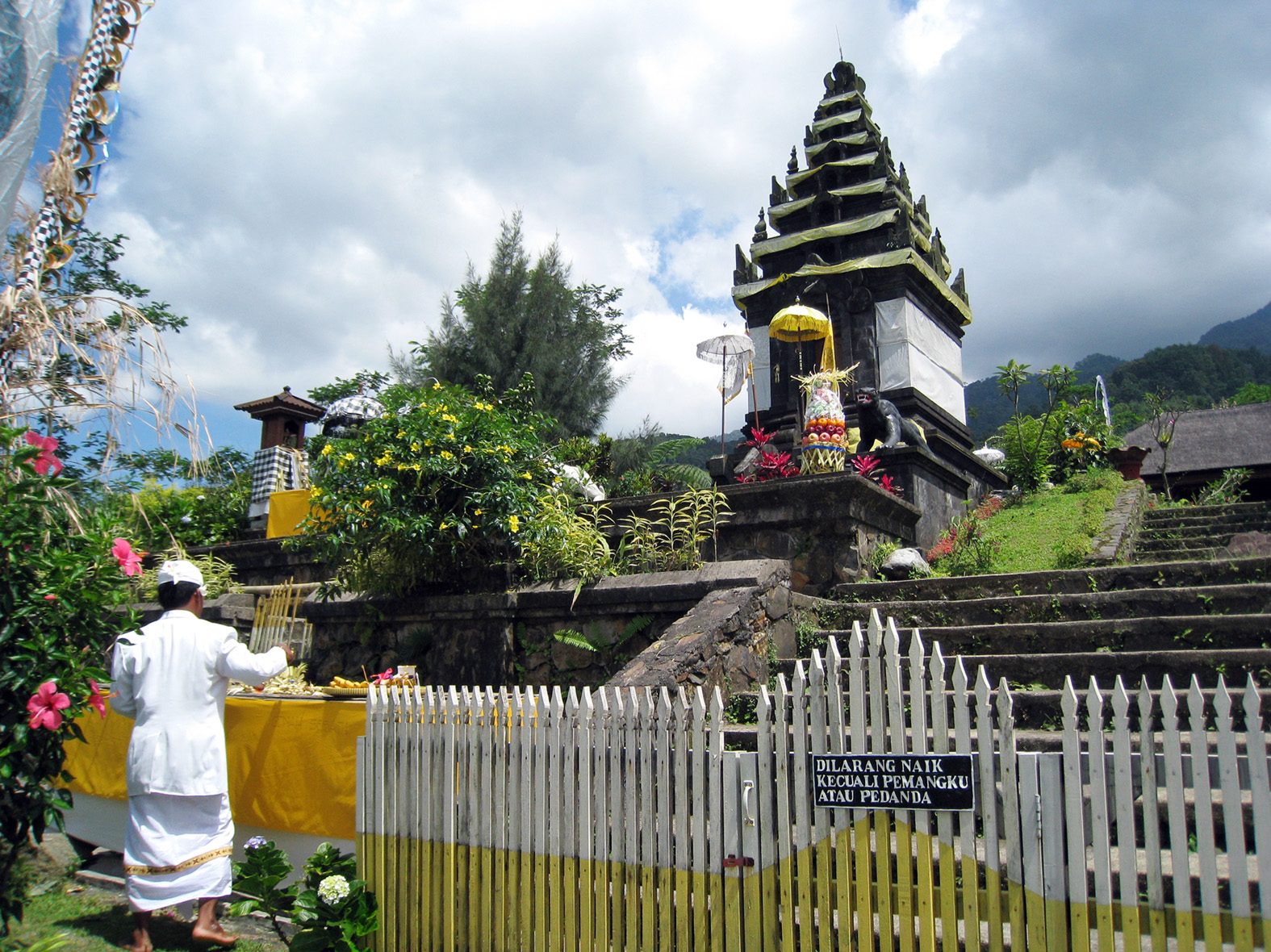
Pura Parahyangan Agung Jagatkarta, a Hindu shrine dedicated to Prabu Siliwangi, Bogor

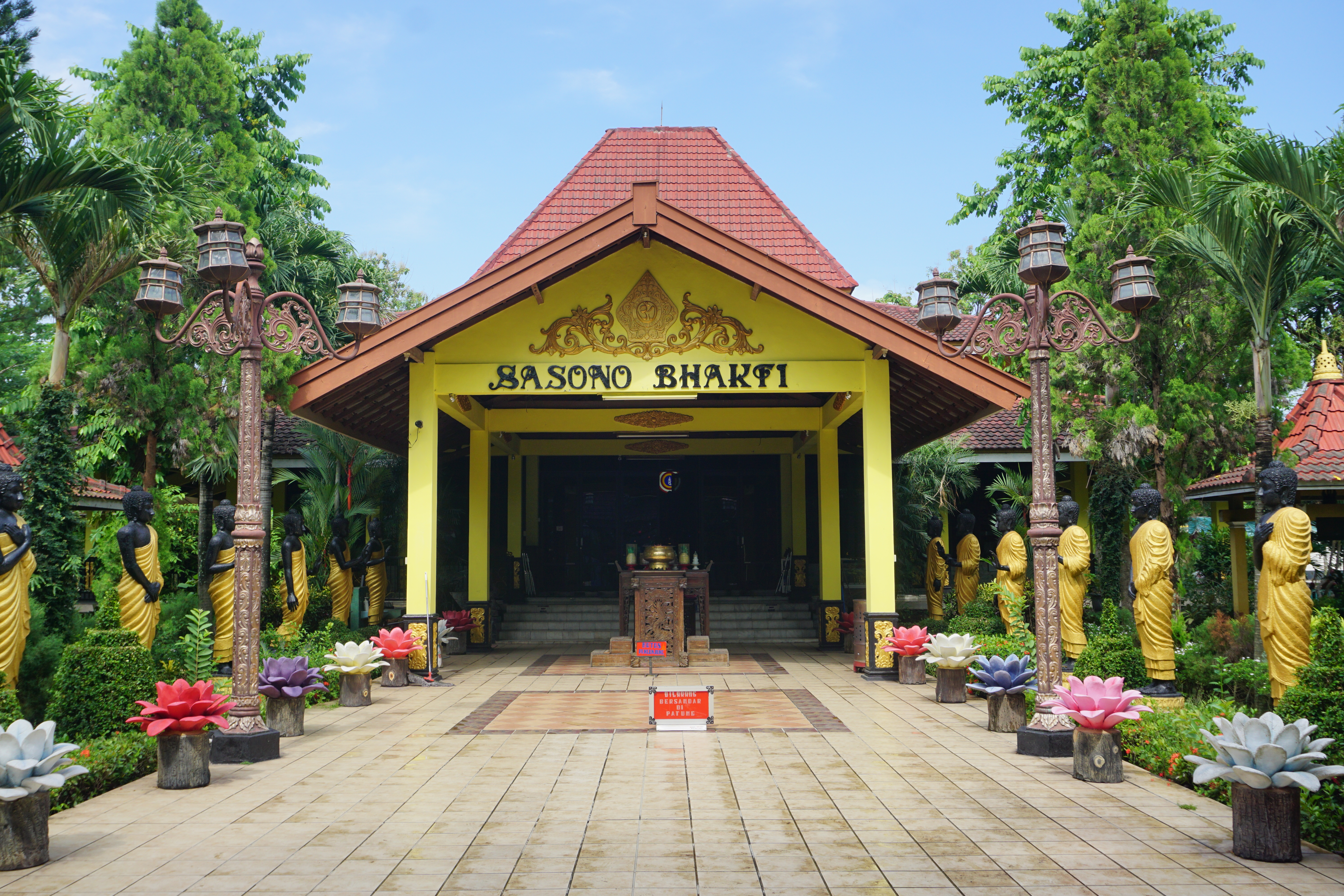
Maha Vihara Mojopahit, a Buddhist monastery near Trowulan Majapahit temple, Mojokerto

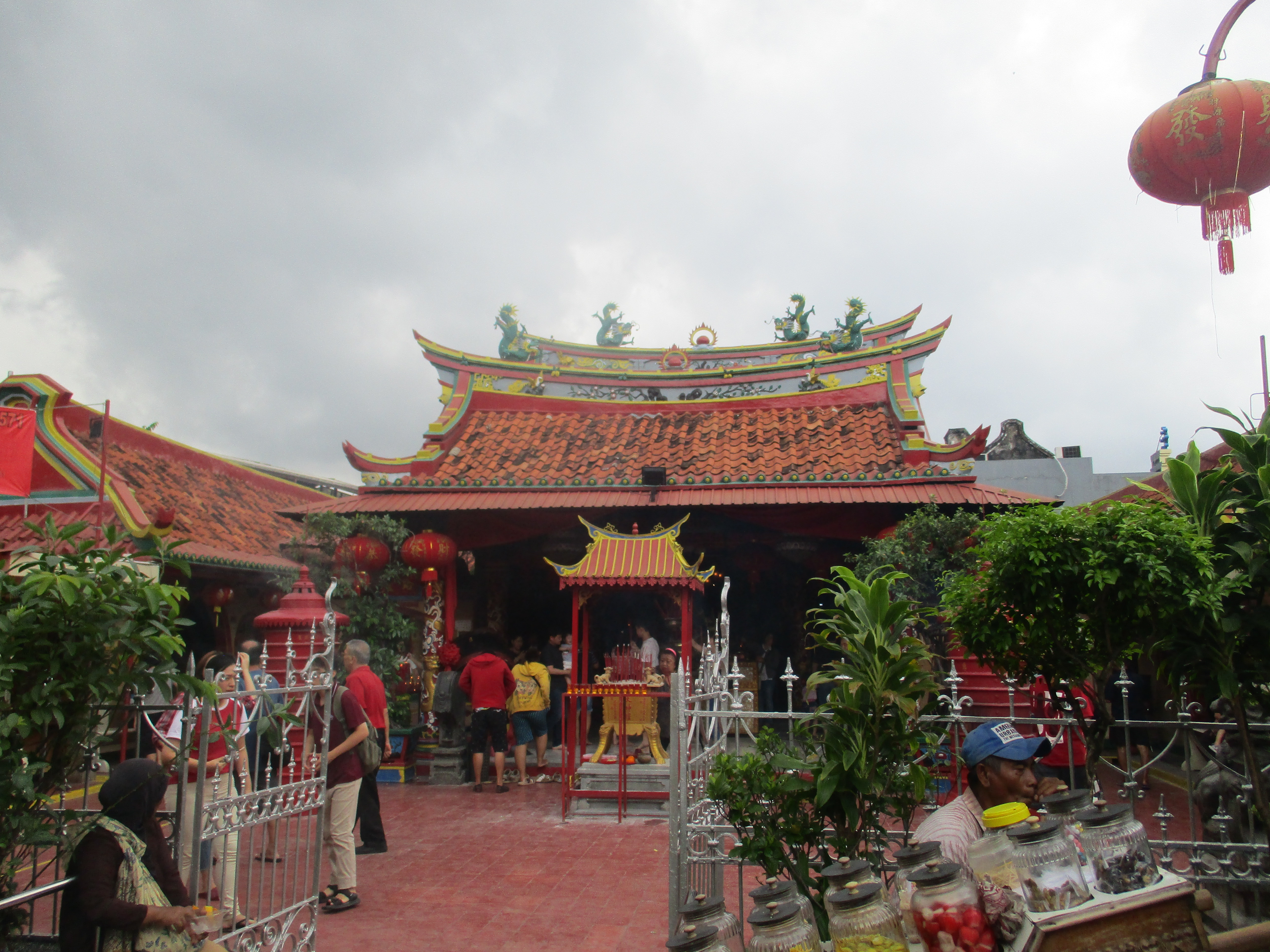
Boen Tek Bio, the oldest Chinese temple in Tangerang

Pre-Islamic Javanese traditions have encouraged Islam in a mystical direction. There emerged in Java a loosely structured society of religious leadership, revolving around kyais, possessing various degrees of proficiency in pre-Islamic and Islamic lore, belief and practice. The kyais are the principal intermediaries between the villages masses and the realm of the supernatural. However, this very looseneess of kyai leadership structure has promoted schism. There were often sharp divisions between orthodox kyais, who merely instructed in Islamic law, with those who taught mysticism and those who sought to reform Islam with modern scientific concepts. As a result, there is a division between santri, who believe that they are more orthodox in their Islamic belief and practice, with abangan, who have mixed pre-Islamic animistic and Hindu-Indian concepts with a superficial acceptance of Islamic belief.

There are also Christian communities, mostly in the larger cities, primarily among Chinese Indonesian and minority Javanese even some rural areas of south-central Java are strongly Roman Catholic. Buddhist communities also exist in the major cities, primarily among the Chinese Indonesian. The Indonesian constitution recognises six official religions.

A wider effect of this division is the number of sects. In the middle of 1956, the Department of Religious Affairs in Yogyakarta reported 63 religious sects in Java other than the official Indonesian religions. Of these, 35 were in Central Java, 22 in West Java and six in East Java. These include Kejawen, Sumarah, Subud, etc. Their total membership is difficult to estimate as many of their adherents identify themselves with one of the official religions. Sunda Wiwitan is a traditional Sundanese religion, its adherents still exist in several villages.

== Economy ==
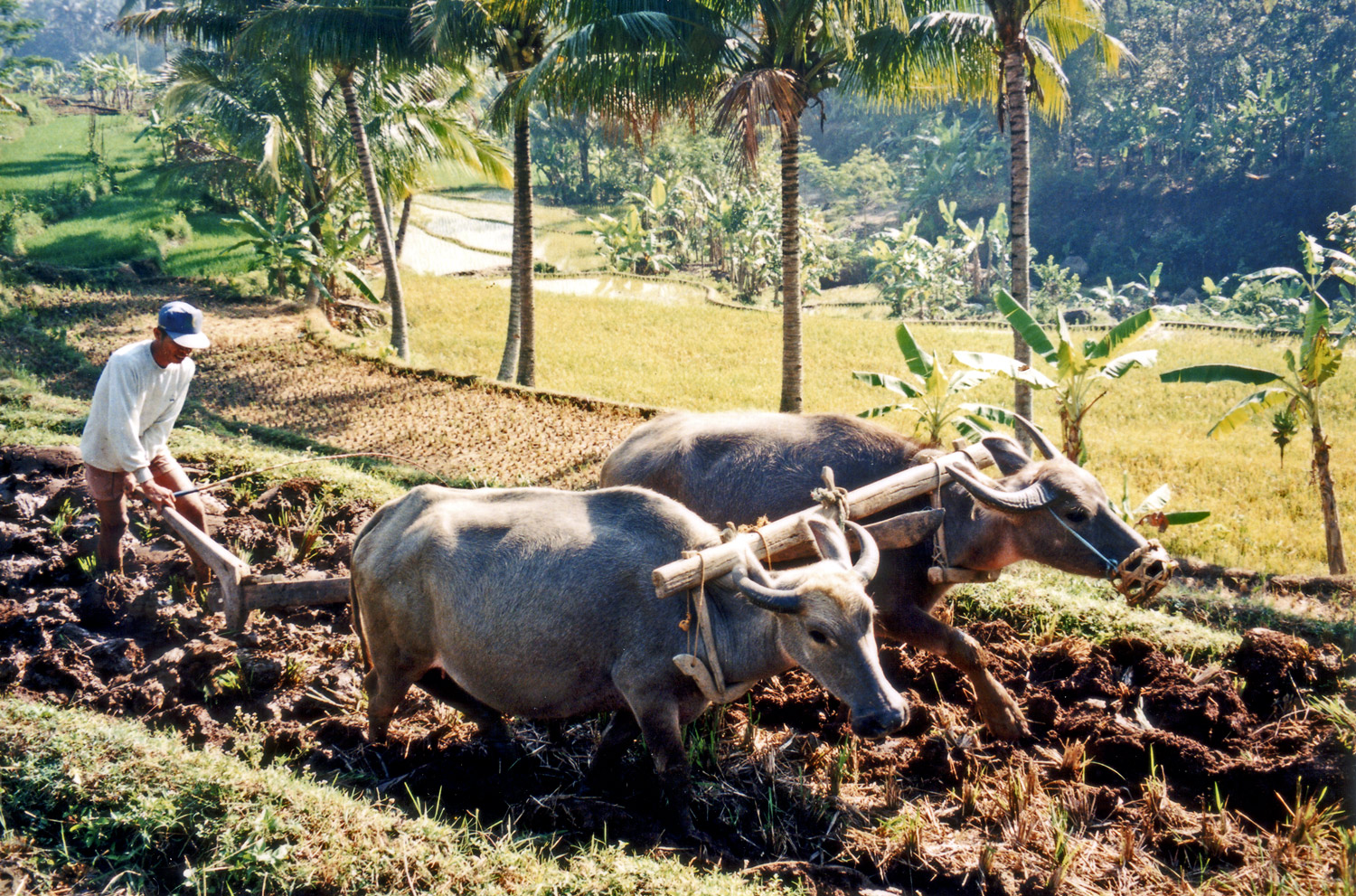
Water buffalo ploughing rice fields near Salatiga, in Central Java

Initially the economy of Java relied heavily on rice agriculture. Ancient kingdoms such as the Kingdoms of Sunda, Mataram, and Majapahit were dependent on rice yields and tax. Java was famous for rice surpluses and rice export since ancient times, and rice agriculture contributed to the population growth of the island. Trade with other parts of Asia such as ancient India and China flourished as early as the 4th century, as evidenced by Chinese ceramics found on the island dated to that period. Java also took part in the global trade of Maluku spice from ancient times in the Majapahit era, until well into the Dutch East India Company (VOC) era.

The VOC set their foothold on Batavia in the 17th century and was succeeded by the Dutch East Indies in the 19th century. During these colonial times, the Dutch introduced the cultivation of commercial plants in Java, such as sugarcane, rubber, coffee, tea, and quinine. In the 19th and early 20th century, Javanese coffee gained global popularity. Thus, the name "Java" today has become a synonym for coffee.

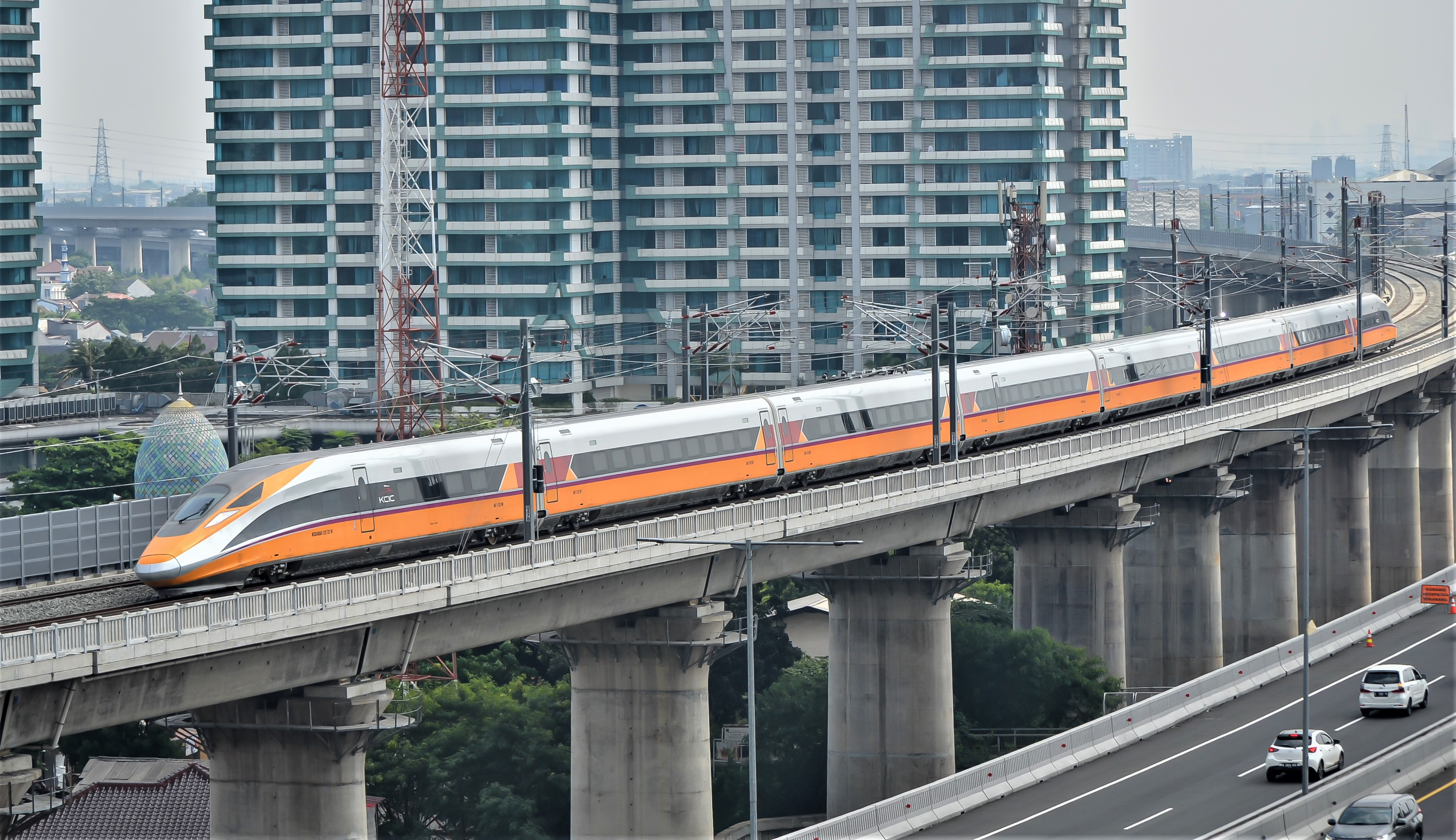
Whoosh high-speed train passing through Bekasi city

Java has been Indonesia's most developed island since the Dutch East Indies era and continues to be so today in the modern Republic of Indonesia. The road transportation networks that have existed since ancient times were connected and perfected with the construction of Java Great Post Road by Daendels in the early 19th century. It became the backbone of Java's road infrastructure and laid the base of Java North Coast Road (Indonesian: Jalan Pantura, abbreviation from "Pantai Utara"). The need to transport commercial produces such as coffee from plantations in the interior of the island to the harbour on the coast spurred the construction of railway networks in Java. Today, industry, business, trade and services flourished in major cities of Java, such as Jakarta, Surabaya, Semarang, and Bandung; while some traditional Sultanate cities such as Yogyakarta, Surakarta, and Cirebon preserved its royal legacy and has become the centre of art, culture and tourism. Industrial estates are also growing in towns on northern coast of Java, especially around Cilegon, Tangerang, Bekasi, Karawang, Gresik and Sidoarjo. The toll road highway networks was built and expanded since the New Order until the present day, connecting major urban centres and surrounding areas, such as in and around Jakarta and Bandung; also the ones in Cirebon, Semarang and Surabaya. In addition to these motorways, Java has 16 national highways.

Java transport network

Based on the statistical data by the year of 2021 released by Statistics Indonesia (Badan Pusat Statistik), Java alone contributes around 60% of Indonesia's GDP or equivalent to US$686 billion (int$2.0 trillion, PPP).

== See also ==
- History of Indonesia
- List of monarchs of Java

== Bibliography ==
- Taylor, Jean Gelman (2003). Indonesia: Peoples and Histories. New Haven and London: Yale University Press. ISBN 978-0-300-10518-6.
