= Tantu Pagelaran =

Old Javanese manuscript

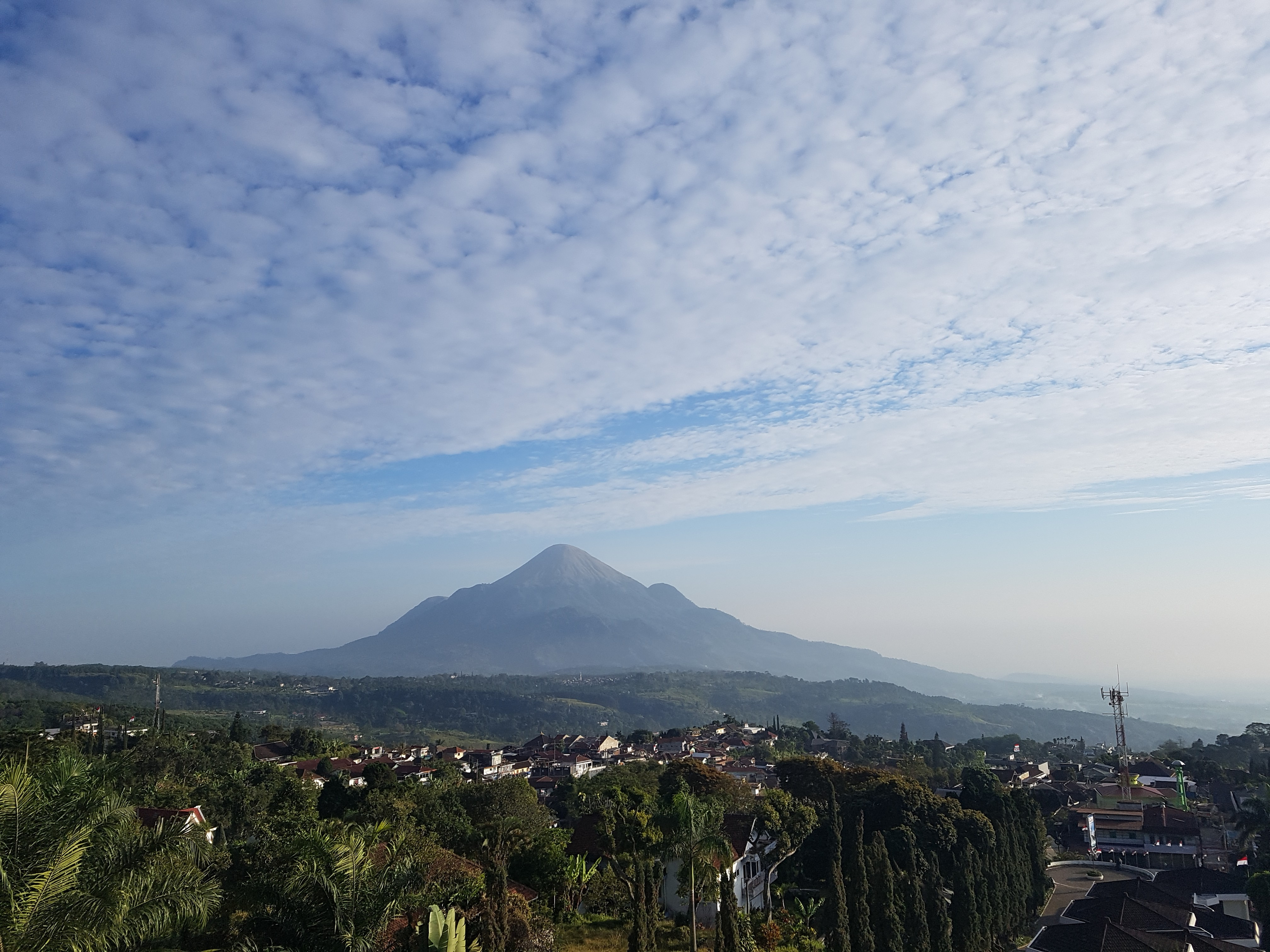
Mount Pawitra (Penanggungan) in East Java, surrounded by symmetric hills, believed as the top part of the mythical Mount Meru mentioned in Tantu Pagelaran

Tantu Pagelaran or Tangtu Panggelaran is an Old Javanese manuscript written in the Kawi language that originated from the 15th-century Majapahit period. The manuscript describes the mythical origin of Java island.

== Background ==
The manuscript was composed in the 15th century, originating from East Java. Stuart Robson and Hadi Sidomulyo have posited that the origins of the text may date to the era of the Kediri kingdom due to historical and topographical references within the work. While the original text itself has no section breaks, contemporary scholars have attempted to divide the work for structure and simplicity. The 1924 Dutch translation by Theodoor Pigeaud divided the text into seven chapters roughly corresponding to its subject matter. The English translation by Robson and Sidomulyo divides the text into three large parts.

== Legend of moving Meru to Java ==
The manuscript explained that Batara Guru (Shiva) ordered the gods Brahma and Vishnu to fill the island of Java with human beings. However, at that time Java Island was floating freely on the ocean, ever tumbling and always shaking. To make the island still, the gods decided to nail the island upon the earth by moving a part of Mahameru in Jambudvipa (India) and attaching it to Java.

The god Vishnu transformed into a giant turtle and carried a part of Mount Meru upon his back, while the god Brahma transformed into a giant naga serpent and wrapped his body around the mountain and giant turtle's back, so the Meru mountain could be transported safely to Java.

Initially, the gods placed the holy mountain on the first part of Java they had arrived upon, which is the western part of Java. However, the enormous weight of the Meru mountain had tilted the island and caused the imbalance; the eastern end of Java had risen high. The gods decided to move the mountain eastward; by doing so the gods had scattered the mountain fragments and created the volcanoes and mountainous regions spanned from west to east along Java. When the main part of the Meru Mountain was attached to the eastern part of Java, the island was still tilted and not well balanced, this time it was the western part of Java that rose. To make the island balanced, the gods cut a small tip and placed it in the northwest part of East Java. The tip became Mount Pawitra today identified with Mount Penanggungan, while the main part of Meru mountain became Semeru volcano and became the abode of Lord Shiva.

When Sang Hyang Shiva arrived at Java, he saw so many Jawawut plants, thus the island was named Java. Vishnu became the first ruler of Java and incarnated as the king named Kandiawan. He brought civilizations upheld order and managed government, social, and religious matters.

== Interpretation ==
The mountainous volcanic nature and geographic conditions of Java and Bali correspond and are suitable with Hindu mythology. Hindu cosmology believed that Mount Meru or Mahameru was the abode of gods and connected the realm of mortals with svarga, the realm of gods. People of Java and Bali still revere the mountain as the abode of Gods, Devata, Hyang, and other spiritual beings. The legend that mentioned that the island of Java is occasionally shaking is interpreted as the traditional native way to explain the earthquake natural phenomena.
