= China Road and Bridge Corporation =

Chinese state-owned construction firm

- Native name: 中国路桥工程有限责任公司
- Type: Subsidiary
- Industry: Engineering and construction
- Founded: 1958; 68 years ago (predecessor); 1979; 47 years ago (current entity)
- Headquarters: Beijing, China
- Area served: Worldwide
- Key people: Lu Shan (chairman); Du Fei (president)
- Services: Design, engineering and construction of transportation infrastructure
- Parent: China Communications Construction Company
- Website: www.crbc.com

China Road and Bridge Corporation (CRBC), a subsidiary of China Communications Construction Company (CCCC), is a Chinese state-owned construction and engineering firm that focuses on global infrastructure projects such as highways, skyways, railways, bridges, ports, and tunnels. Growing out of the Foreign Aid Office of the Ministry of Communications of China, CRBC and its predecessors have been executing projects since 1958. In 1979, CRBC was formally established and entered the international contracting market. The partner entity, CCCC, was formed through the combination of CRBC and China Harbour Engineering Company Ltd (CHEC) in 2005.

CRBC has played a key role in the design and construction of both greenfield and brownfield infrastructure projects in developing countries, especially those located in Africa where it is a market leader. The company has full EPC capabilities, and actively pursues P3 projects, often acting as concessionaire.

In addition to the design and construction of infrastructure, CRBC is engaged in infrastructure equity investment; real estate development and management; and industrial park equity investment and development.

== Notable bridge projects ==
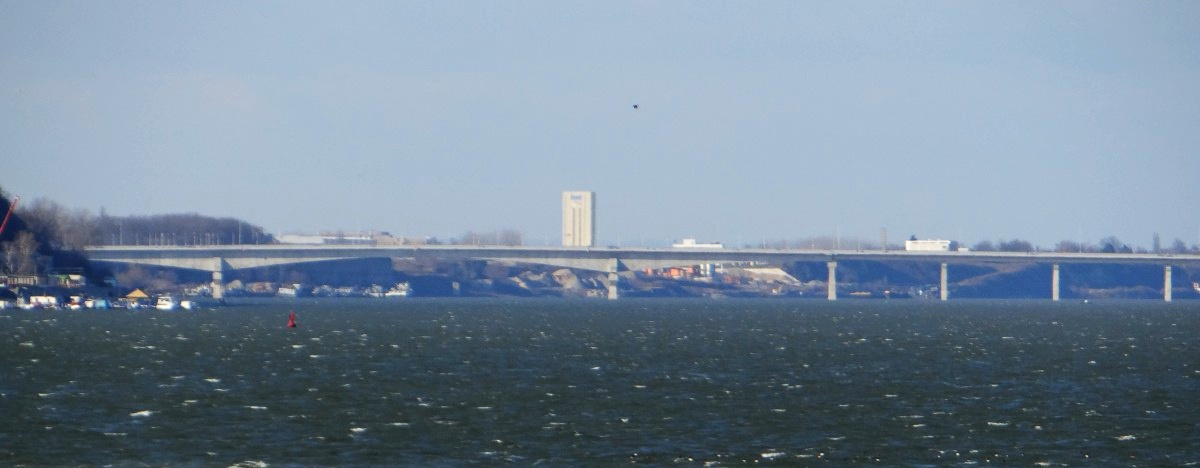
Pupin bridge (Belgrade)

- Pelješac Bridge (Croatia), a US$340m project; the first time that a Chinese company has won the bid for a project funded by the European Union
- Danyang–Kunshan Grand Bridge, considered the longest bridge in the world
- Hong Kong–Zhuhai–Macau Bridge (connects Hong Kong with Macau and Zhuhai), which is among the longest fixed-links in the world
- Pupin Bridge (Serbia), the second bridge constructed over the Danube in Belgrade
- Sutong Yangtze River Bridge (China), which had the longest main span of any cable-stayed bridge in the world between 2008 and 2012, is currently listed as one of the tallest bridges, and won an Outstanding Civil Engineering Achievement (OCEA) award from the American Society of Civil Engineers
- Suramadu Bridge (Indonesia), the longest bridge in Indonesia and the first bridge to cross the Madura Strait
- Tayan Bridge (Indonesia), the longest bridge in Borneo
- Cao Lãnh Bridge (Vietnam)
- Xiamen Haicang Bridge in Fujian Province (China), which is on the list of longest suspension bridge spans
- Donghai Bridge (China), the first sea-crossing bridge completed in China and one of the longest cross-sea bridges in the world
- Hangzhou Bay Bridge (China), which is among the ten longest trans-oceanic bridges
- Runyang Yangtze River Bridge (China), the third longest suspension bridge span in the world and the largest in China
- Jintang Bridge (China), the third longest cross-sea bridge built in China
- National Regional Road (Gabon)
- Foundiougne Bridge (Senegal)
- Cunene River Bridge (Angola), the longest bridge in Angola
- Maputo–Katembe bridge (Mozambique)
- Qin Dwin River Bridge (Myanmar)
- Bubiyan Bridge (Kuwait)
- Cross Bay Link (Hong Kong, SAR China)
- Binondo–Intramuros Bridge (Philippines)
- Estrella–Pantaleon Bridge (Philippines)
- Davao–Samal Bridge (Philippines, under construction), a 3.980-kilometer bridge connecting Davao City and Samal Island
- Davao River Bridge (Philippines, under construction), a 1.340-kilometer bridge in Davao City connecting Ecoland segment and Roxas Avenue segment of the Davao City Coastal Road.
- NLEX Connector Section 2 (Philippines, under construction)
- Fourth Bridge on the Danube in Novi Sad (Serbia, under construction)
- Fifth Bridge on the Danube in Novi Sad (Serbia, under construction)

== Notable tunnel projects ==
- Erlangshan Tunnel on Sichuan-Tibet Highway (China), one of the world's longest tunnels
- Kozjak Tunnel (Croatia)
- Shakhristan Tunnel of the Tajikistan-Uzbekistan Highway (Tajikistan), the longest tunnel in Tajikistan
- Karnaphuli Tunnel (Bangladesh)
- Datong-Yuncheng Expressway Yanmenguan Tunnel (China)
- Zun-Chong Expressway Qingshaogang Tunnel (China)

== Notable road projects ==
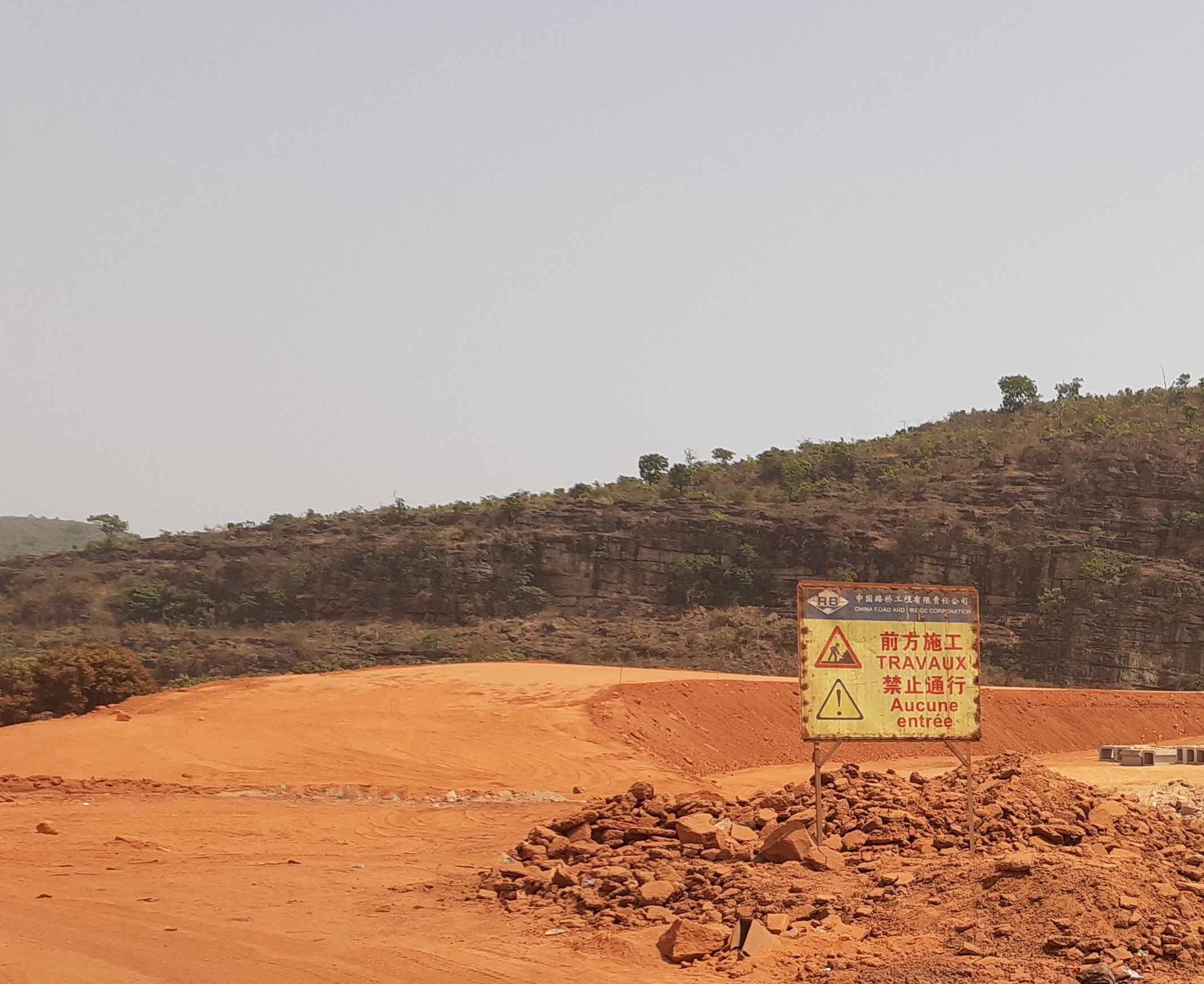
Roadworks between Conakry and Coyah (Guinea)

- Beijing Capital Airport Expressway (China)
- Brazzaville Viaduct Project (Congo-Brazzaville), the first viaduct in Congo-Brazzaville and the longest bridge in west and central Africa
- Shanghai–Nanjing Expressway (China)
- Addis Ababa to Nazret Expressway (Ethiopia)
- Addis Ababa Ring Road Project (Ethiopia)
- Datong–Yuncheng Expressway, the largest expressway structure in China's Shanxi province
- Thies-Touba Toll Highway (Senegal)
- Phnom Peng - Sihanoukville Expressway Project (Cambodia), a $1.7 billion project that includes 89 bridges
- National Road No. 7 Improvement Project in Xieng Khouang Province (Laos)
- Pifo-Papallacta Road Project (Ecuador)
- Los Granados Overpass Project of Quito City (Ecuador)
- Kigali Urban Road Upgrading Project (Rwanda) - with this project, CRBC has built 70% of Rwanda's asphalt roads
- Osh-Wootz Road Rehabilitation Project (Kyrgyzstan)
- Rehabilitation of the Caxito to N'zeto Road (Angola)
- Smokovac-Uvač-Mateševo section of the Bar-Boljare Motorway (Montenegro), which has 19 bridges, 16 tunnels, and 3 interchanges
- Pakistan Karakoram Highway Upgrading Project (Pakistan), one of the highest paved roads in the world
- Dare-e-Sof and Yakawlang Road (Afghanistan), a 550 km road over mountainous terrain requiring eight large bridges as well as 194 small bridges
- Rehabilitation and Modernization of the Alfao-Sanvé Condji-Bénin Border Road (Togo)
- Odienne-Gbelegban Highway Project (Côte d'Ivoire)
- Thies-Touba Toll Highway Project (Senegal)
- Madagascar Capital Airport Road Project (Madagascar)
- Phnom Penh-Sihanoukville expressway (Cambodia)
- Nairobi Expressway Project in Nairobi, Kenya's capital

== Notable rail projects ==
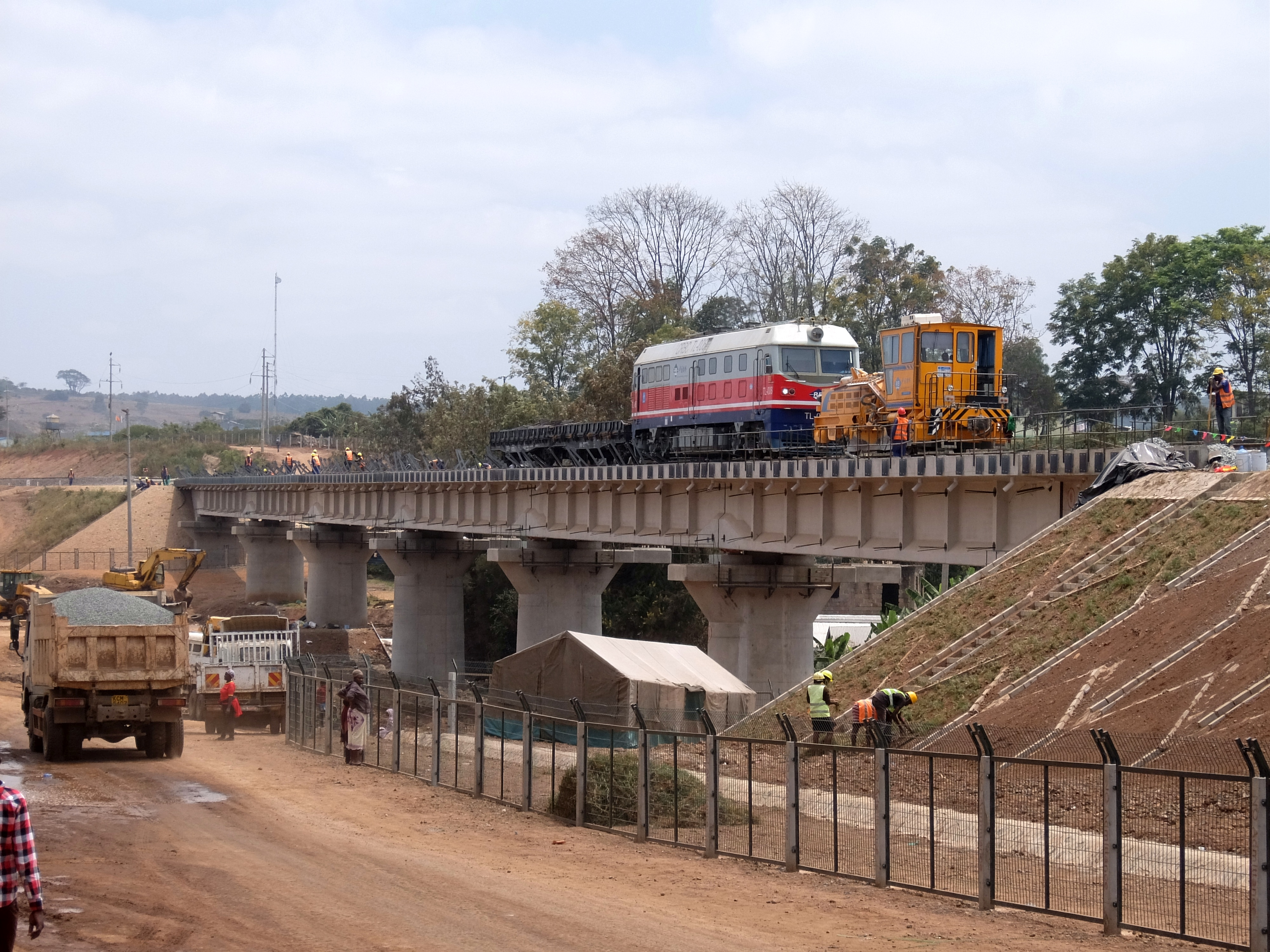
A DF4D owned by CRBC in the construction site of Nairobi–Malaba Standard Gauge Railway

- Beijing–Shanghai high-speed railway (China), the world's longest high-speed rail ever constructed in a single phase
- Mombasa–Nairobi Standard Gauge Railway (Kenya), the largest infrastructure project constructed in Kenya since independence; received an Award of Merit from Engineering News Record (ENR)
- Nairobi-Naivasha Standard Gauge Railway (Kenya)
- Yongzhou-Liuzhou Section Expansion Project of Hunan-Guangxi High-Speed Railway (China)
- Harbin-Dalian Passenger Dedicated Line (China)
- Datong-Xi’an Railway Passenger-Dedicated Stations Section 14 (China)
- Nanjing–Anqing Railway Section 5 (China)
- 2 Section of Chengdu-Kunming High-Speed Railway (China)
- Hefei-Guangzhou High Speed Rail (China)
- Haergai Station to Muli Coal Mine, Qinghai-Tibet Plateau (China)
- Ngong-Riruta-Karen Commuter Railway (Kenya)

== Notable port, airport and other projects ==
In connection with the Belt and Road Initiative, in May 2022 China Road and Bridge Corporation (along with Shanghai Construction Company) began developing a port complex, special economic zone, and related housing and green space in Kampot, Cambodia.

- Beijing Capital International Airport Terminal 3 (China), the second largest airport terminal in the world and the ninth largest building in the world by area
- Section IV of the 3RS Project at Hong Kong International Airport
- Bata Port Project (Equatorial Guinea), the first large modern port in Central Africa
- Saint Mary Road Port Project (Madagascar)
- OYO Inland Wharf Project (Congo-Brazzaville)
- Friendship Port of Nouakchott (Mauritania)
- No. 19 Berth in Mombasa (Kenya), the first port project of Kenya since 1984
- Cabinda University (Angola)
- Zaire Province Hospital Project (Angola)
- Kampar Sports Complex (Malaysia)
- Teacher Training Institute (Malaysia)
- Yachay University Real Estate Project (Ecuador)
- Funan Techo Canal
