= Funan Techo Canal =

Proposed Cambodian infrastructure project

Specifications
- Length: 180 km (110 miles)

Geography
- Start point: Kep
- End point: Phnom Penh Autonomous Port, Kandal

The Funan Techo Canal (Khmer: ព្រែកជីកហ្វូណនតេជោ), officially known as the Tonle Bassac Navigation Road and Logistics System Project is a 180-kilometre (110 mi) long canal under construction in Cambodia, connecting Phnom Penh Autonomous Port with Kep and the Gulf of Thailand.

== Naming ==
Funan is a name given by ancient Chinese cartographers refers to a Southeast Asian ancient kingdom that existed from 1st century CE to 5th century CE comprising present-day Cambodia, Southern Vietnam, Southern Thailand and Eastern Thailand. Techo (តេជោ) is a title given to army commanders by the King of Cambodia. It also appears in the name of Techo International Airport, which is located near the eastern end point of the canal.

== Overview ==
Proposed route of the canal

Geographic map of Cambodia

The canal would begin at the Takeo Canal of the Mekong River, pass through the Ta Ek Canal of the Bassac River and finally merge with the Ta Hing Canal of the Bassac River in Koh Thom district. It would connect Phnom Penh directly with the country's only deep-sea port in Sihanoukville and the new port in Kampot. The canal crosses through regions totaling 1.6 million inhabitants.

The current plan includes constructing three dams with sluices and eleven bridges. The canal will be 100 metres (330 ft) wide and 5.4 metres (18 ft) deep, supporting vessels up to 3,000 DWT. The groundbreaking of the canal's construction was held on 5 August 2024. The target completion date is 2028.

A ground breaking ceremony was held in August 2024. Land demarcation and marking for phase one was 55% in mid-December 2024.

== Impact on other countries ==
Currently Cambodia relies heavily on using Vietnamese ports, notably that of Cai Mep. The new canal would significantly reduce this dependency. Vietnam has also raised environmental concerns.

Vietnam claimed to have an interest in the canal according to the 1995 Mekong Agreement, but Cambodia refused to give Vietnam insight in the canals details citing that it only has a notification duty under the agreement. According to Cambodia's Deputy Prime Minister Sun Chanthol the canal would require only 5 m^{3}/s of flow from the Mekong, equivalent to 0.053% of the total flow, and the canal would contribute to mitigating floods in Vietnam.

Cambodia has denied that the Chinese navy would utilize the canal, responding to Vietnamese concerns.

== Funding ==
The project is expected to cost US$1.7 billion. Funding was expected to come entirely from the China Road and Bridge Corporation (CRBC); the feasibility study was in progress in March 2024. The project will be developed under a BOT (build-operate-transfer) contract.

By June 2024, the canal was no longer a predominantly foreign invested project, with 51% of the stake owned by Cambodian entities. In August 2024, it was reported that China would provide 49% of the funding.

By December 2024, China had not made "definitive commitments" to funding the project, and no Chinese construction contracts had been issued. According to Brian Eyler, director of the Stimson Centre's Southeast Asia Programme, a lack of economic viability, the costs of long-term maintenance, and environmental impact, was deterring investors. According to Sokvy Rim, a research fellow with the Cambodian Centre for Regional Studies, the Cambodian government could fund the project alone. In April 2025 China and Cambodia signed $1.2 billion agreement to finance the canal.

== See also ==
- Phnom Penh-Sihanoukville Expressway
- Vĩnh Tế Canal
