= Peanut production in Indonesia =

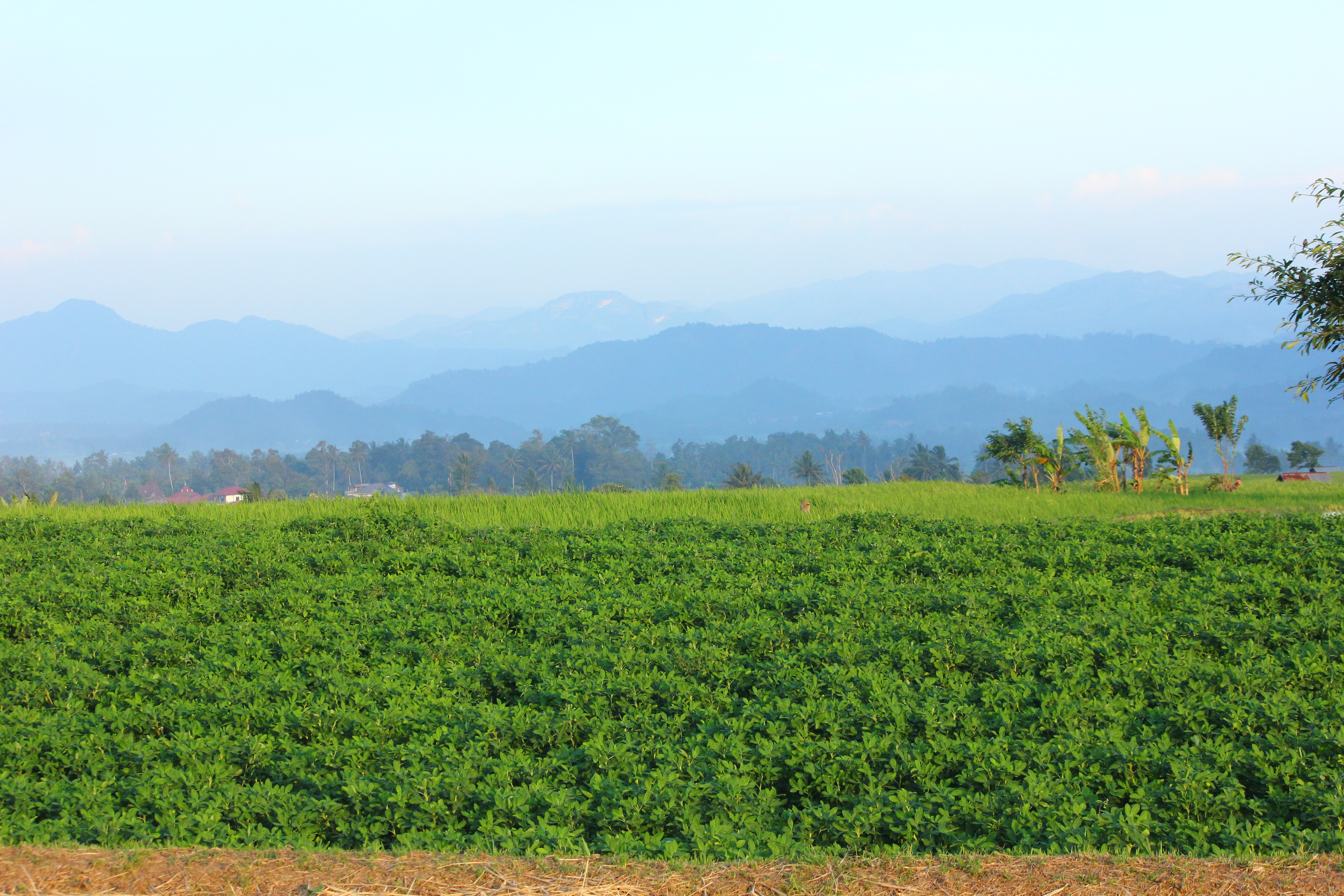
A peanut field in West Sumatra.

Peanut production in Indonesia began in commercial quantities during the second half of the eighteenth century. During the colonial period and early after independence, the country was a major producer and exporter, but increased consumption and reduced production has turned Indonesia into a major peanut importer. Most of the national production is centered in Java, especially East Java, with smaller production centers in the Lesser Sunda Islands and South Sulawesi.

== History ==
The first introduction of peanuts to the Indonesian archipelago was likely by Spanish or Portuguese sailors travelling to the Maluku Islands in the late 16th or early 17 century. According to Dutch records, the crop was introduced to the vicinity of Batavia in 1755 by Chinese merchants, and it was planted in crop rotation with rice. The production around Batavia was geared towards producing cooking oil (and lamp oil) – which the city previously lacked – but by 1778 over 50 peanut oil mills had been established with around 600 workers. In 1920, the Dutch East Indies government reported that around 500,000 acres (200,000 hectares) in Java and Madura were used for peanut cultivation, and the Dutch East Indies was the fifth-largest peanut producer in the world behind India, French West Africa, China, and the United States.

Indonesia was a net exporter of peanuts up until the early 1970s, but became a major importer afterwards. As of the early 2020s, annual production of peanuts in Indonesia hovered around 400 thousand tons, compared to just under 1 million tons in 1993/1994. It is typically planted as a dryland crop during the rainy season or early into the dry season, though in some areas it is planted in paddy fields.

== Distribution ==
According to the Ministry of Agriculture, East Java was the largest producer of peanuts in the country, contributing 120 thousand tons or around 30 percent of national production in 2022. In turn, Tuban Regency of East Java was the province's largest center of production, with 21 to 28 thousand hectares of land used for peanut cultivation in Tuban alone, and another 26 to 31 thousand hectares in the regencies of Bangkalan and Blitar. Yogyakarta Special Region, West Java, and Central Java are also major contributors, the four provinces producing 75 percent of the national total. Outside Java, major contributors are West Nusa Tenggara, East Nusa Tenggara, and South Sulawesi.

Much of the peanut production in West Nusa Tenggara is absorbed by local food manufacturers, e.g. Garudafood which worked in a International Finance Corporation-backed project there to promote peanut production with local farmers. Peanuts are the province's fourth-most cultivated crop, behind rice, maize, and soybeans.
