= Shitai Expressway =

Road in China

The Shitai Expressway (Chinese: 石太高速公路) links Shijiazhuang, capital of China's Hebei province, to Taiyuan in the west, capital of Shanxi province.

Spanning a distance of over 150 kilometres, it passes through Jiuguan, Niangzi Pass, Pingding, Yangquan, Shouyang and Jinzhong before arriving at Taiyuan.

It is also known in Shanxi as the Taijiu Expressway (from Taiyuan to Jiuguan).

It links with the ring road expressway near Taiyuan, ultimately linking north to the Dayun Expressway heading toward Datong, and southwest toward the Jiaofen Expressway and the Dayun Expressway heading south toward Yuncheng.
