= Trunojoyo University =

Public university in Bangkalan, Indonesia

- Universitas Trunojoyo
- Type: Public university
- Established: 2001
- Rector: Safi'
- Location: Bangkalan, Indonesia; 7.12775°S 112.723083°E
- Campus: Urban
- Website: www.trunojoyo.ac.id

Trunojoyo University (Unijoyo) is a public university in the Bangkalan Regency (on Madura island), in East Java province, Indonesia. Unijoyo was redesignated as a public university under the Presidential Decree dated July 5, 2001. The college was inaugurated on 23 July 2001 by President Abdurrahman Wahid.

== History ==
University Trunojoyo is a continuation of the University of Bangkalan Madura (Unibang); the 'change in status', of Private Higher Education Institutions to State Universities, was based on Presidential Decree No. 85 of 2001 dated 5 July 2001.

The inauguration took place on 23 July 2001. In his speech, Abdurrahman Wahid, president of the Republic of Indonesia at the time, said that the Madurese community's desire to have a state university had been reached.
