= Lukman Hakim (regent) =

Indonesian politician (born 1980)

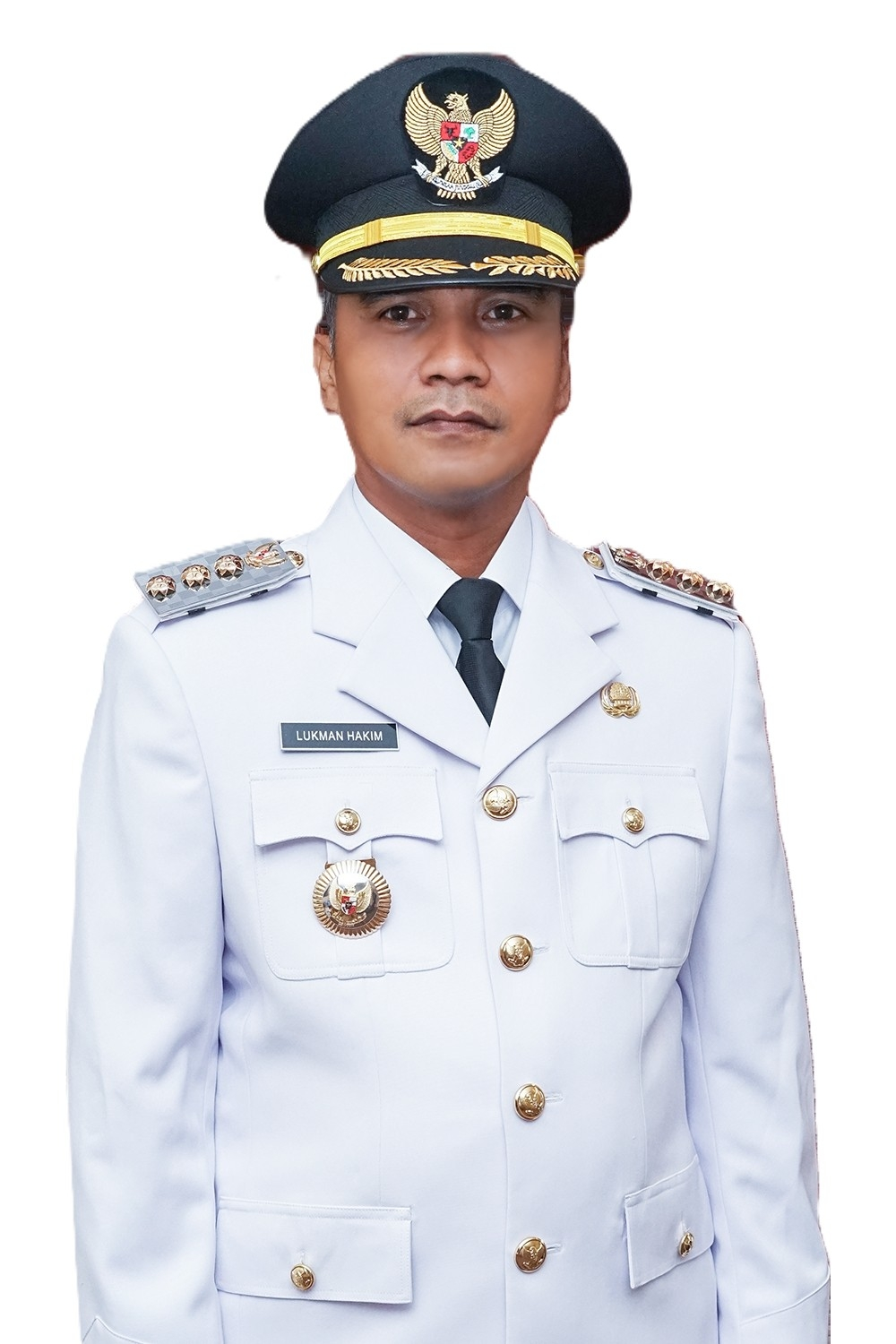
- Portrait as regent, 2025

20th [[Regent of Bangkalan]]
- Incumbent
- Assumed office 20 February 2025
- President: Prabowo Subianto
- Governor: Khofifah Indar Parawansa
- Deputy: Fauzan Ja'far
- Preceded by: Arief Moelia Edie (Act.)

Personal details
- Born: 20 October 1980 (age 46) Bangkalan, East Java, Indonesia
- Party: PDI-P

Lukman Hakim (born 20 October 1980) is an Indonesian politician from the Indonesian Democratic Party of Struggle who currently serves as Regent of Bangkalan since 20 February 2025.

== Early life ==
Lukman Hakim was born on 20 October 1980 in Katol Barat village within Bangkalan Regency, East Java. He completed his basic education there, graduating from a state-funded madrasa in 1999 before he enrolled at Muhammadiyah University of Malang where he graduated in 2004. He was active in the Indonesian Islamic Students Movement organization during his time at university. Later in 2017, he received a master's degree from Trunojoyo University in Bangkalan.

== Career ==
Not long after graduating from university, Hakim was elected as village head at his home village of Katol Barat. He served in this position between 2005 and 2019. He also became director at a drinking water company in addition to owning the company PT Karya Mandiri. In the 2019 Indonesian general election, Hakim unsuccessfully ran for a seat in the East Java Regional House of Representatives as a candidate for the Indonesian Democratic Party of Struggle (PDI-P). He made another attempt in 2024 but was again not elected.

Still in 2024, Hakim decided to run for regent of Bangkalan Regency. His running mate was Fauzan Ja'far, a provincial legislator of the National Awakening Party (PKB). In addition to PDI-P and PKB, the pair received endorsements from 10 other political parties. The pair won the election, securing 319,072 votes and defeating United Development Party's Mathur Husyairi. They were sworn in on 20 February 2025. Hakim stated that the priority of his term would be in infrastructure and public service improvements, followed by attempts to attract foreign investors.

Political offices
Preceded by Mohni (A.O.); Arief Moelia Edie (Act.)	Regent of Bangkalan; 2025–present	Succeeded by Incumbent
