= Madura Strait =

Strait in Indonesia

- Selat Madura (Indonesian)
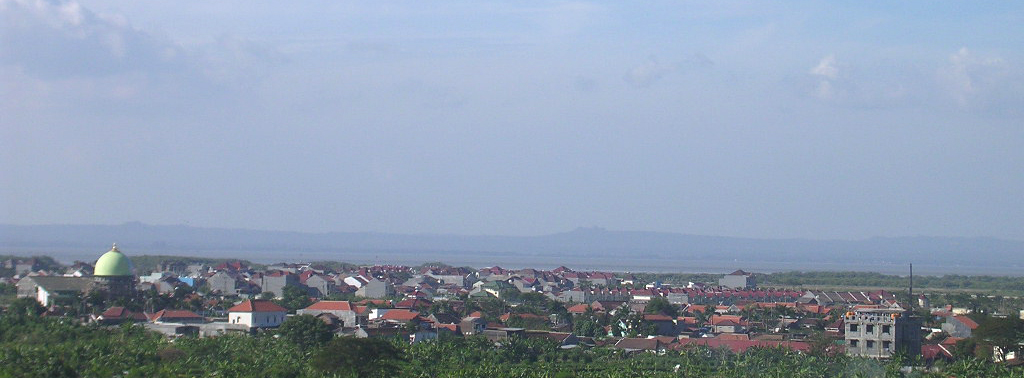
- Madura Strait as seen from Surabaya with Madura Island in the background.

- Location within Indonesia

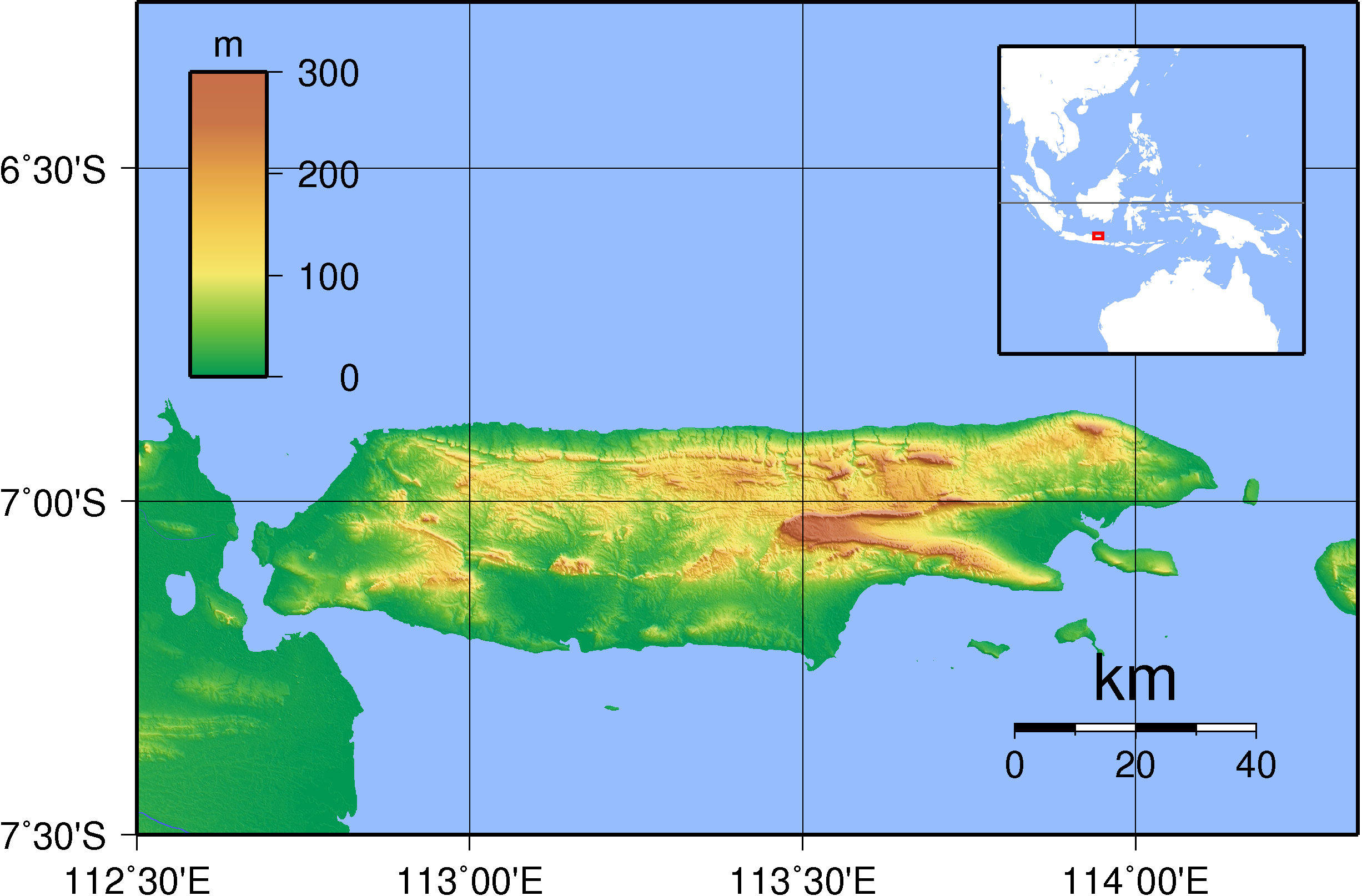
- Madura Strait separates the islands of Java (left) and Madura (center).
- Location: Southern Indonesia, between Java Sea, Bali Sea, and Bali Strait
- Coordinates: 7°21′S 113°03′E
- Type: Strait
- Part of: Indian Ocean
- Primary inflows: Brantas River; Bengawan Solo
- Basin countries: Indonesia
- Surface area: 9,500 km^{2} (3,700 sq mi)
- Average depth: 49 m (161 ft)
- Max. depth: 81 m (266 ft) at Eastern Side of Madura Strait
- Settlements: Gresik, Surabaya, Sidoarjo, Pasuruan, Probolinggo, Situbondo, Sumenep, Sampang, Pamekasan, Bangkalan
- References: Selat Madura: Indonesia National Geospatial-Intelligence Agency, Bethesda, MD, USA

Madura Strait is a stretch of water that separates the Indonesian islands of Java and Madura, in the province of East Java. The islands of Kambing, Giliraja, Genteng, and Ketapang lie in the Strait. The Suramadu Bridge, the longest in Indonesia, spans the strait between Surabaya on Java and Bangkalan on Madura.

In some old Western and old Indonesian sources, the strait commonly appears as Surabaya Strait (Indonesian: Selat Surabaya), but this name is not accepted in the official cartography.

== Geography ==
The Madura Strait is located in the east of the province of northern East Java, precisely in the southwest, north, and east of the city of Surabaya; east of Sidoarjo Regency; west and south of the island of Madura; and north of the Pasuruan, Probolinggo, and Situbondo area. In this strait there are also small islands, including Kambing Island, Giliraja Island, and Genteng Island near the island of Madura, and Ketapang Island in the coastal waters of Probolinggo Regency. As a maritime waterway, the Madura strait connects various seas alongside of the Java sea, Bali sea, and Bali strait.

A remarkable story about the origin of the Madura Strait is contained in the Javanese historical poem of Nagarakertagama, dating from circa 1365. According to the author of the poem, the strait between Java and Madura, which originally were supposedly a single island, was formed in 202 as a result of a powerful earthquake. This version does not have any scientific confirmation.

== Culture and economic importance ==
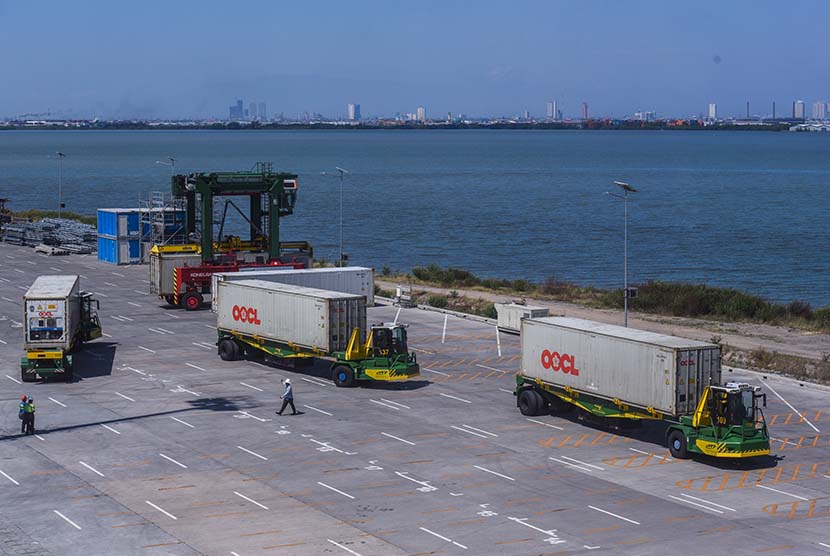
Activities in Tanjung Perak

The Madura Strait coastal community has a culture similar to other coastal communities. One of its customs is a tradition held on a specific date, based on the Islamic calendar, called Pethik Laut, in the form of offerings carried together and released in the middle of the beach. The livelihood of the majority of people throughout the Madura Strait coastline is as fishermen and salt farmers; the strait coastal area is also one of the largest salt producers in Indonesia.

The Madura Strait is also a center for tourism, industry and transportation. A power plant, PLTU Paiton, is located on the coast of the strait, in the Paiton sub-district, Probolinggo Regency, and is one of the largest of Java. Tourism attractions on the Madura Strait coast include the famous ones at Kenjeran Beach in Surabaya, Bentar Beach in Probolinggo District, and Pasir Putih Beach in Situbondo Regency.

Sea transportation facilities include ferry boats, which connect the Madura Strait on two lines, namely the line connecting Ujung Port (Surabaya) with the Port of Kamal (Bangkalan, Madura), and the line connecting Kalianget Port (Sumenep, Madura) with Pelabuhan Jangkar (Situbondo, East Java). Another transportation facility is the Suramadu Bridge as a means of land transportation connecting Java with Madura, having a major impact on the economy of the two islands.
