= Expressways of Cambodia =

Expressway network of Cambodia

System information
- Maintained by Ministry of Public Works and Transport
- Length: 190.6 km (2022) (118.4 mi)

Highway names

The Expressway network of Cambodia currently consists of one expressway in operation, one expressway under construction, and one under feasibility study. The government has noted three goals for developing an expressway network:

- Regional integration with neighboring countries
- Linking the wealthier capital Phnom Penh with other cities to let other provinces benefit from the development
- Improving transportation in Cambodia, reducing congestion and allowing more suitable roads for heavy trucks

== Phnom Penh-Sihanoukville Expressway ==
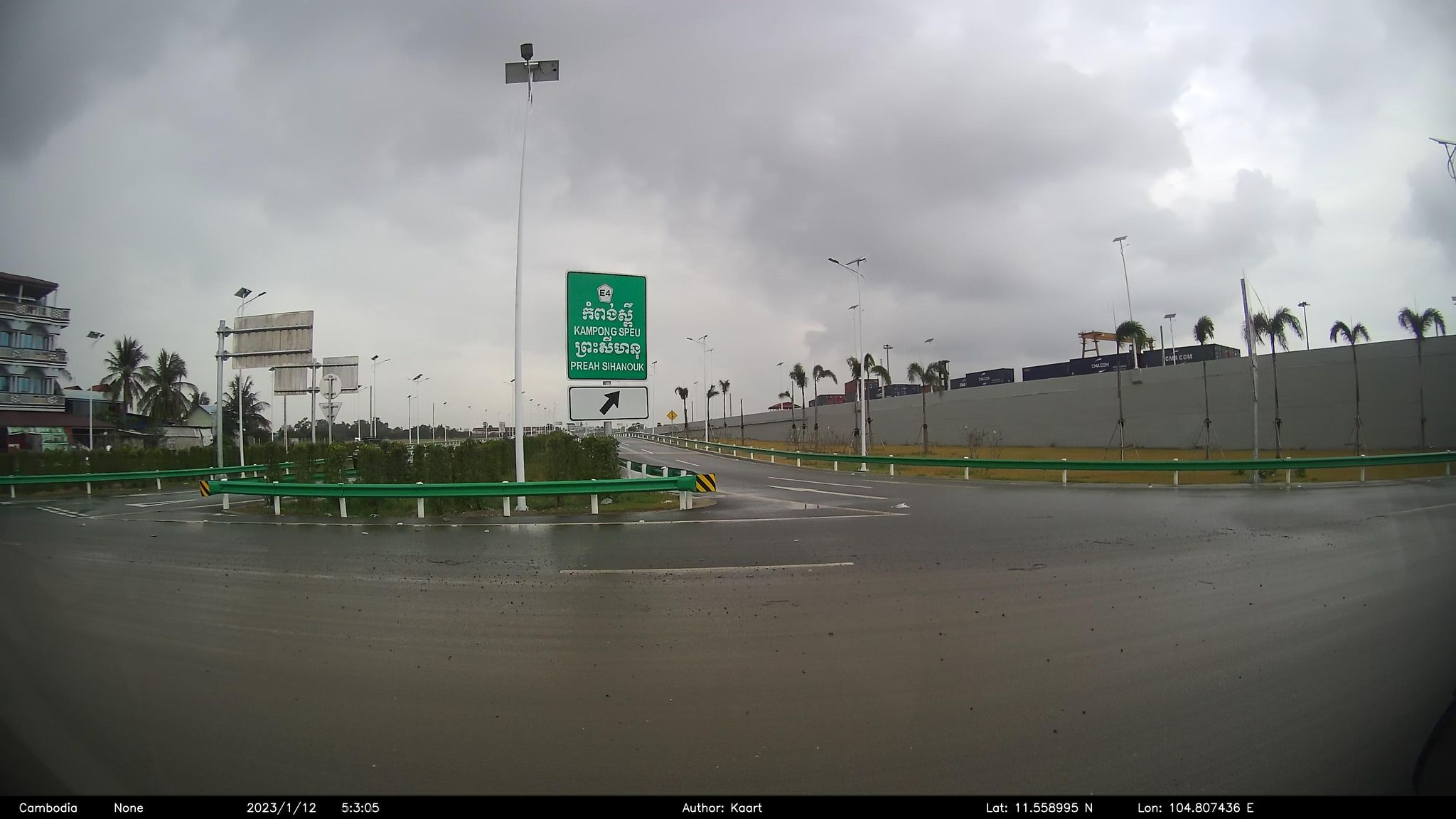
Entrance to the Phnom Penh-Sihanoukville Expressway in Phnom Penh

The first expressway, the Phnom Penh-Sihanoukville Expressway, was funded by the China Road and Bridge Corporation for US$2 billion under a build-operate-transfer contract.

Only cars, buses, and trucks under 40 T and 5.2m are allowed on the expressway. This will allow the travel time between the two terminal cities to be halved from 6 hours.

The road opened to the public on October 1, 2022, under a one-month free of charge trial. Toll fees range from 0.08 USD/km for passenger cars to 0.40 USD/km for trucks over 20 tons.

== Phnom Penh-Bavet Expressway ==
On November 9, 2022, Cambodian Prime Minister Hun Sen and Chinese Premier Li Keqiang has signed a memorandum of understanding to build the 138 km Phnom Penh-Bavet Expressway.

The second expressway, the Phnom Penh-Bavet being studied and planned by the China Road and Bridge Corporation, and expected to start construction in June 2023. The expressway will have a length of 138 kilometers, with width of 25.5 meters, consist of 4 lanes (2 lanes a side).

Phnom Penh-Bavet Expressway is expected to booster the transportation and import-export between Cambodia and Vietnam and reduce the transportation cost and time between the two countries.

On June 7, 2023, Hun Sen officially announced and presided over the ground-breaking ceremony of the Phnom Penh-Bavet Expressway with the length of 135.10 km. The expressway's construction is set to be carried out by the esteemed China Road and Bridge Corporation (CRBC), adhering to a 48-month timeline and scheduled for completion in 2027.

== Phnom Penh-Siem Reap-Poipet Expressway ==
On March 28, 2023, Ministry of Public Works and Transport announce in a letter to related-provincial authorities on the feasibility study of Phnom Penh Siem Reap Expressway. The announcement was met with great reception from the public as Siem Reap is one of the most popular tourist destinations for Cambodians and National Road 6 is currently one of the most congested roads in Cambodia as it passes through heavily populated provinces such as Kampong Cham, Kampong Thom, and Siem Reap.

In tandem with presiding over the ground breaking ceremony for PP-Bavet Expressway, Hun Sen also announced the feasibility of the highly anticipated Phnom Penh-Siem Reap-Poipet Expressway, a massive project which touted to be cost somewhere around $4 billion. The Phnom Penh-Siem Reap-Poipet Expressway Project is Cambodia's third expressway project that will pass through five capital-provinces, including Phnom Penh, Kandal, Kampong Cham, Kampong Thom and Siem Reap, with approximately total length of 400 kilometers.

== List ==
Number	Shield	Name	Khmer Name	Origin	Terminus	Length	Began Construction	Operation Status
E1		Phnom Penh-Bavet Expressway	ផ្លូវល្បឿនលឿនភ្នំពេញ-បាវិត	Phnom Penh	Bavet	138 kilometres (86 mi)	June 2023	Construction began in June 2023
E4		Phnom Penh-Sihanoukville Expressway	ផ្លូវល្បឿនលឿនភ្នំពេញ-ព្រះសីហនុ	Phnom Penh	Sihanoukville	190.6 kilometres (118.4 mi)	March 2019	Open for Public use in October 2022
E6		Phnom Penh-Siem Reap-Poi Pet	ផ្លូវល្បឿនលឿនភ្នំពេញ-សៀមរាប-ប៉ោយប៉ែត	Phnom Penh	Poi Pet	Approx. 400 kilometers (248.5 mi)	TBD	Under detailed study, began Jun 2023

== See also ==
- Transport in Cambodia
- China Road and Bridge Corporation (CRBC)
