= Bangkalan Regency =

Regency in East Java, Indonesia

Bangkalan Regency Kabupaten Bangkalan
- Regency

Regional transcription(s)
  - Madurese: Bhângkalan (Latèn) بٓڠكالان (Pèghu) ꦏꦧꦸꦥꦠꦺꦤ꧀ꦧꦁꦏꦭꦤ꧀ (Carakan)
  - Javanese: Bang Kulon (Gêdrig) باڠ كولَون (Pégon) ꦧꦁꦏꦸꦭꦺꦴꦤ꧀ (Hånåcåråkå)
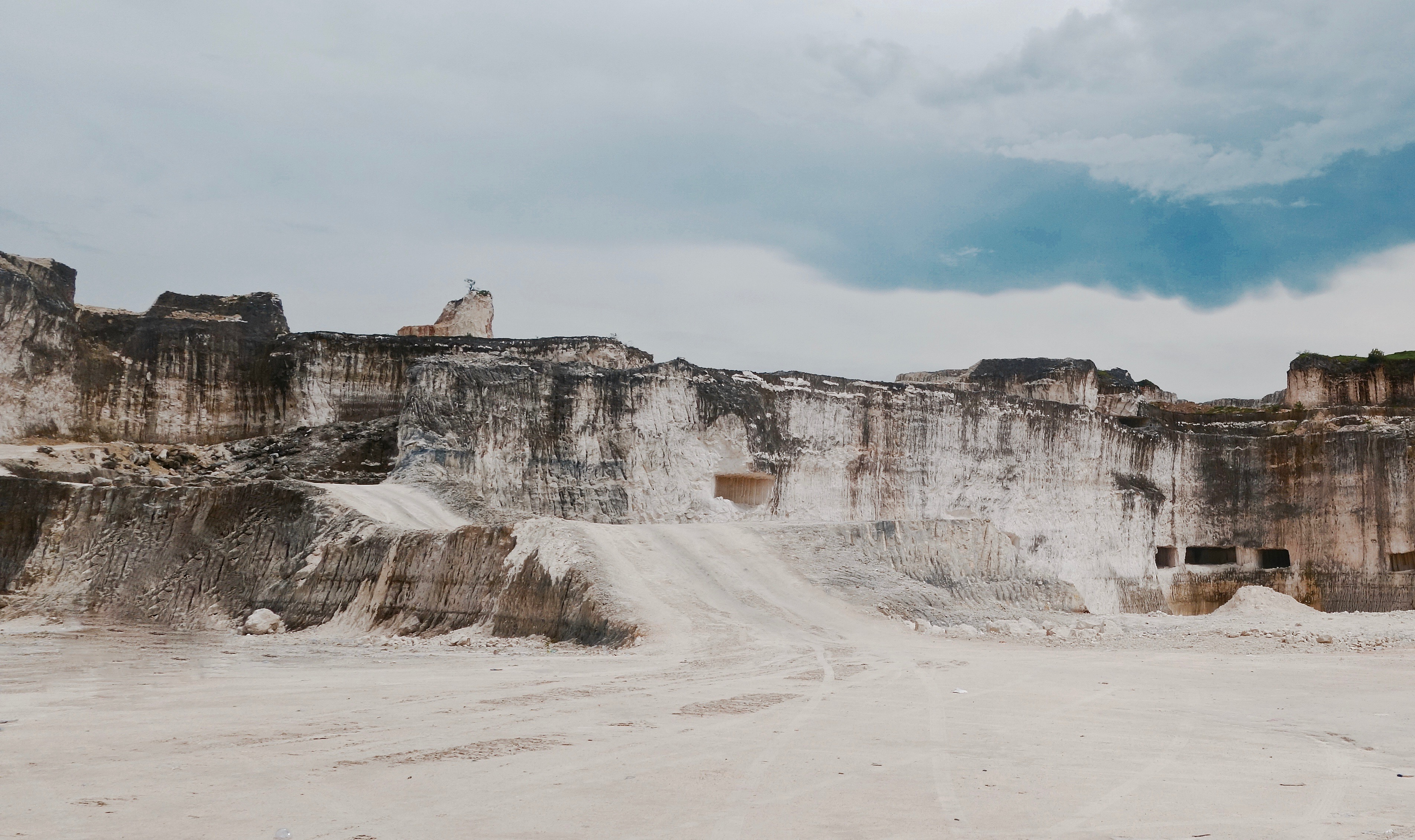
- Bukit Jaddih

- Coat of arms
- Mottoes: Cipta Indra Çakti Dharma (Sanskrit) (Successful efforts by the grace of God)
- Interactive map of Bangkalan Regency
- Location in Java and Indonesia Bangkalan Regency (Indonesia)
- Coordinates: 7°03′S 112°56′E
- Country: Indonesia
- Province: East Java
- Capital: Bangkalan

Government
  - Regent: Lukman Hakim
  - Vice Regent: Fauzan Ja'far

Area
  - Total: 1,301.03 km^{2} (502.33 sq mi)

Population (mid 2025 estimate)
  - Total: 1,112,956
  - Density: 855.442/km^{2} (2,215.59/sq mi)
- Time zone: UTC+7 (Indonesia Western Time)
- Area code: (+62) 31
- Website: bangkalankab.go.id

Bangkalan Regency (Indonesian: Kabupaten Bangkalan; Madurese: Kabhupatèn Bhângkalan; Pegon: بٓڠكالان; Carakan: ꦏꦧꦸꦥꦠꦺꦤ꧀ꦧꦁꦏꦭꦤ꧀) is a regency (Indonesian: kabupaten) of East Java province in Indonesia. The name Bangkalan comes from the words "bhângka" and "la'an", which mean "already dead" in the Madurese language. The seat of its government is the town of Bangkalan. The regency is located on the west side of Madura Island, bordering Sampang Regency to the east, Java Sea to the north, and Madura Strait to the west and the south sides. It covers an area of 1,301.03 km^{2}, and had a population of 906,761 at the 2010 census (an increase from 805,048 at the previous census in 2000) and reached 1,060,377 at the 2020 census; the official estimate as at mid 2025 was 1,112,956.

In 2009, the Suramadu Bridge was completed, being the first (toll) bridge ever to connect Java and Madura islands. The Suramadu Bridge is the longest in Indonesia. Previously, Kamal port was the main gateway between Madura island and Java, where ferries served the port with the Ujung port near Surabaya, but nowadays people prefer to travel across the toll bridge rather than using ferries, so now only a few ferries serve it in the day time only.

Bangkalan Regency is included in the Gerbangkertosusila development region, an extension of the Surabaya metropolitan area.

== Administrative districts ==
Bangkalan Regency consists of eighteen districts (Indonesian: kecamatan), tabulated below with their areas and their populations at the 2010 census and the 2020 census, together with the official estimates as at mid 2024. The table also includes the locations of the district administrative centres, the number of administrative villages in each district (totaling 273 rural desa and 8 urban kelurahan), and its postcode.

| Kode Wilayah | Name of District (kecamatan) | Area in km^{2} | Pop'n 2010 census | Pop'n 2020 census | Pop'n mid 2024 estimate | Admin centre | No. of villages | Post code |
|---|---|---|---|---|---|---|---|---|
| 35.26.04 | Kamal | 41.40 | 45,942 | 48,763 | 49,348 | Banyuajuh | 10 | 69162 |
| 35.26.12 | Labang | 35.23 | 33,322 | 38,317 | 39,036 | Sukolilo Timur | 13 | 69154 |
| 35.26.11 | Kwanyar | 47.81 | 41,751 | 51,611 | 50,680 | Delemer | 16 | 69163 |
| 35.26.16 | Modung | 78.79 | 43,928 | 46,057 | 43,356 | Patereman | 17 | 69166 |
| 35.26.15 | Blega | 92.82 | 52,058 | 57,726 | 57,391 | Blega | 19 | 69174 |
| 35.26.17 | Konang | 81.09 | 45,023 | 53,434 | 52,979 | Bandung | 13 | 69175 |
| 35.26.18 | Galis | 120.56 | 72,705 | 88,262 | 83,730 | Galis | 21 | 69173 |
| 35.26.13 | Tanah Merah | 68.56 | 56,798 | 70,805 | 69,048 | Petrah | 23 | 69172 |
| 35.26.14 | Tragah | 39.58 | 26,599 | 30,318 | 31,090 | Soket Laok | 18 | 69165 |
| 35.26.02 | Socah | 53.82 | 52,953 | 63,421 | 63,038 | Socah | 11 | 69161 |
| 35.26.01 | Bangkalan (town) | 35.02 | 76,499 | 86,245 | 89,477 | Kraton | 13 ^{(a)} | 69112 – 69119 |
| 35.26.03 | Burneh | 66.10 | 55,840 | 63,567 | 63,072 | Burneh | 12 ^{(b)} | 69121 |
| 35.26.05 | Arosbaya | 42.46 | 40,203 | 48,025 | 46,111 | Arosbaya | 18 | 69151 |
| 35.26.06 | Geger | 123.31 | 62,755 | 81,834 | 80,207 | Campor | 13 | 69152 |
| 35.26.10 | Kokop | 125.75 | 64,531 | 73,941 | 71,047 | Dupok | 13 | 69155 |
| 35.26.09 | Tanjung Bumi | 67.49 | 48,668 | 54,344 | 54,036 | Tanjung Bumi | 14 | 69156 |
| 35.26.08 | Sepulu | 73.25 | 38,826 | 46,487 | 43,167 | Sepulu | 15 | 69154 |
| 35.26.07 | Klampis | 67.10 | 48,360 | 57,220 | 55,218 | Klampis Barat | 22 | 69153 |
| | Totals | 1,260.15 | 906,761 | 1,060,377 | 1,042,031 | Bangkalan | 281 | |

Notes: (a) including 7 urban kelurahan (Mlajah, Kemayoran, Pangeranan, Demangan, Kraton, Pejagan and Bancaran) and 6 desa.
(b) including 1 urban kelurahan (Tunjung).

== See also ==
- List of regencies and cities of Indonesia
