= Harbin–Dalian high-speed train =

Chinese high-speed train service

Harbin–Dalian high-speed train 哈大高速动车组列车
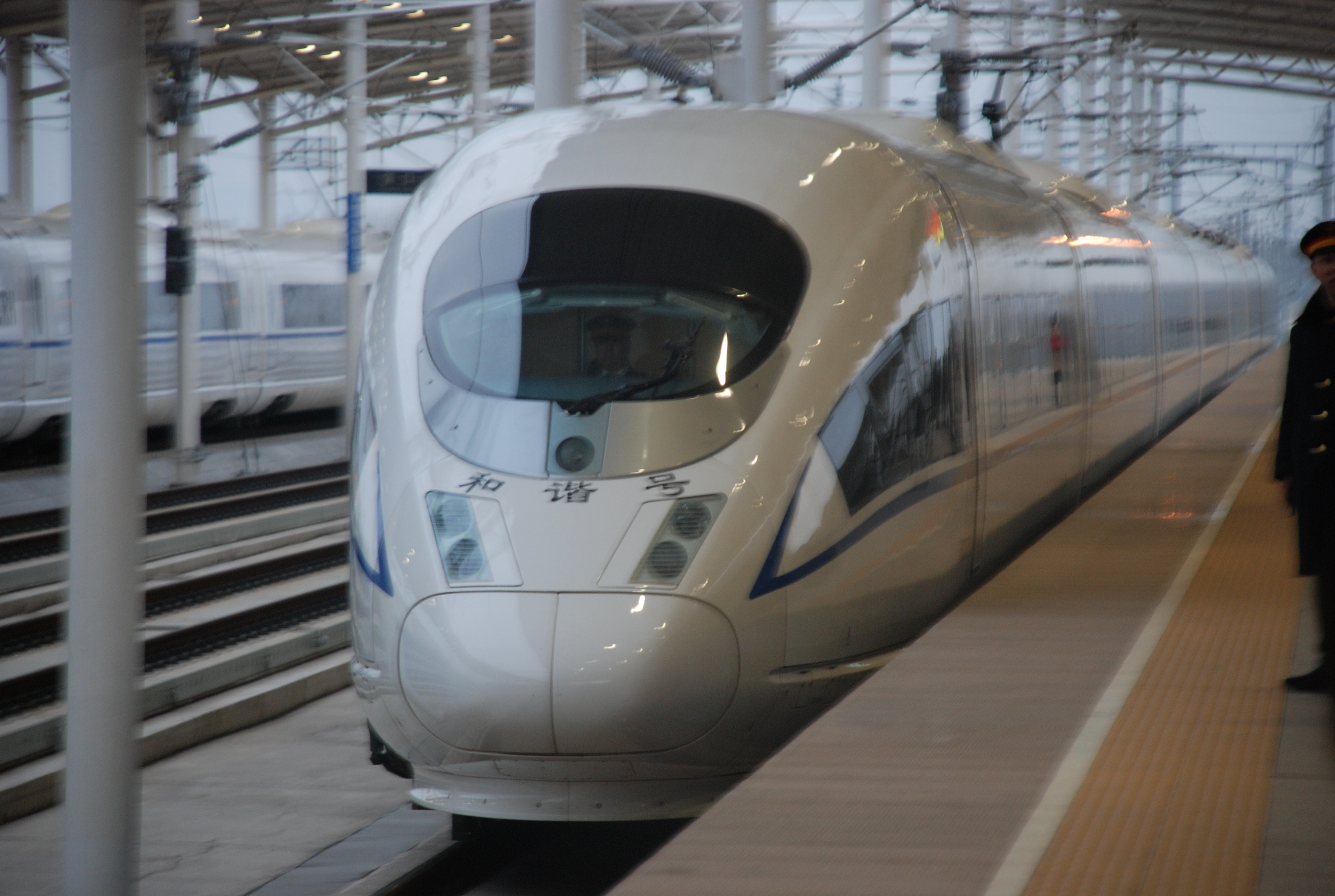

Overview
- Service type: G-series trains
- Status: Operational
- Locale: China
- First service: 21 April 2013
- Current operator(s): CR Harbin; CR Shenyang

Route
- Termini: Harbin West; Dalian North
- Distance travelled: 921 kilometres (572 mi)
- Train number(s): G47-50, G701-732 (odd number for Harbin-bound trains while even number for Dalian-bound trains)
- Line(s) used: Harbin–Dalian HSR

On-board services
- Class(es): Business seat; First class seat; Second class seat
- Catering facilities: Dining car; Trolley refreshment service

Technical
- Rolling stock: CRH380BG
- Track gauge: 1,435 mm (4 ft 8 1/2 in)
- Operating speed: 300 km/h
- Track owner(s): China Railway

The Harbin–Dalian high-speed train (Chinese: 哈大高速动车组列车) are high-speed train services between Harbin, the capital of Heilongjiang Province, and Dalian, a major city in Liaoning Province. The trains are operated by the CR Harbin and CR Shenyang.

== History ==
The high-speed train services between Harbin and Dalian were commenced on 21 April 2013, with the inauguration of the Harbin–Dalian HSR.

At the initial stage, the timetables of the services were different in summer and winter due to climate factors. The summer timetable was effective from 21 April to 30 November, during which the G-series trains with a higher speed were operated. From 1 December 2015, the services have been using one timetable. Trains are operated at a speed of 300 kilometres per hour (190 mph) throughout the year.

== Rolling stocks ==
The CRH380BG EMUs are operated on the services.

== See also ==
- Asia Express
