= Kamal Harbour =

Port on Madura Island in Indonesia

Coordinates: 7.16778°S 112.71917°E

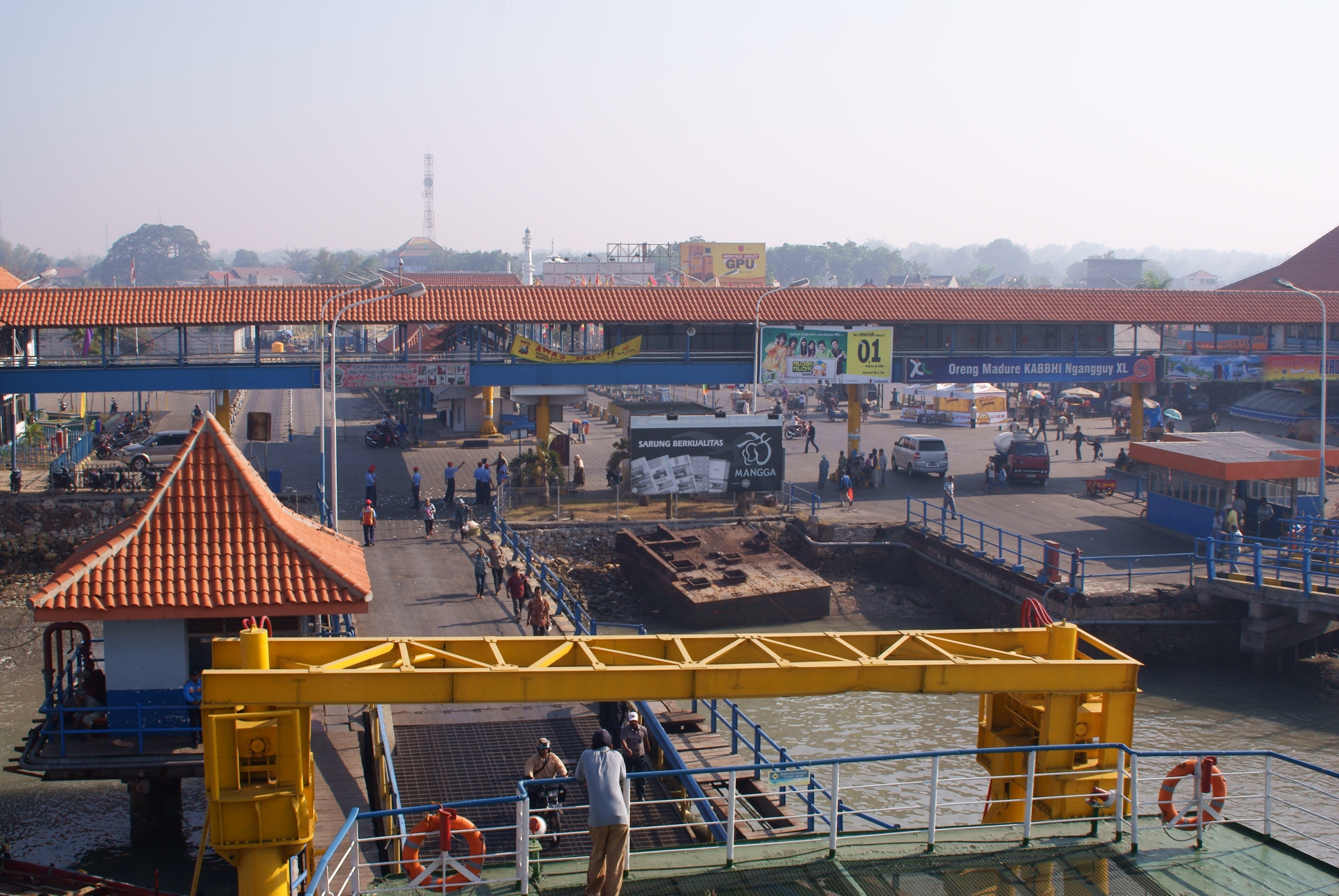
The port of Kamal

Kamal is a port, on Madura Island in Indonesia. It is a ferry port, and connects with Surabaya's harbour of Tanjung Perak.
