= Bangkalan =

Bangkalan Bhângkalan
- Town
- Location in Java and Indonesia Bangkalan (Indonesia)
- Coordinates: 7.025313°S 112.751930°E
- Country: Indonesia
- Region: Java
- Province: East Java
- Regency: Bangkalan Regency

Area
  - Total: 35.02 km^{2} (13.52 sq mi)

Population (mid 2023 estimate)
  - Total: 89,550
  - Density: 2,557/km^{2} (6,623/sq mi)
- Time zone: UTC+7 (IWST)
- Area code: (+62) 31

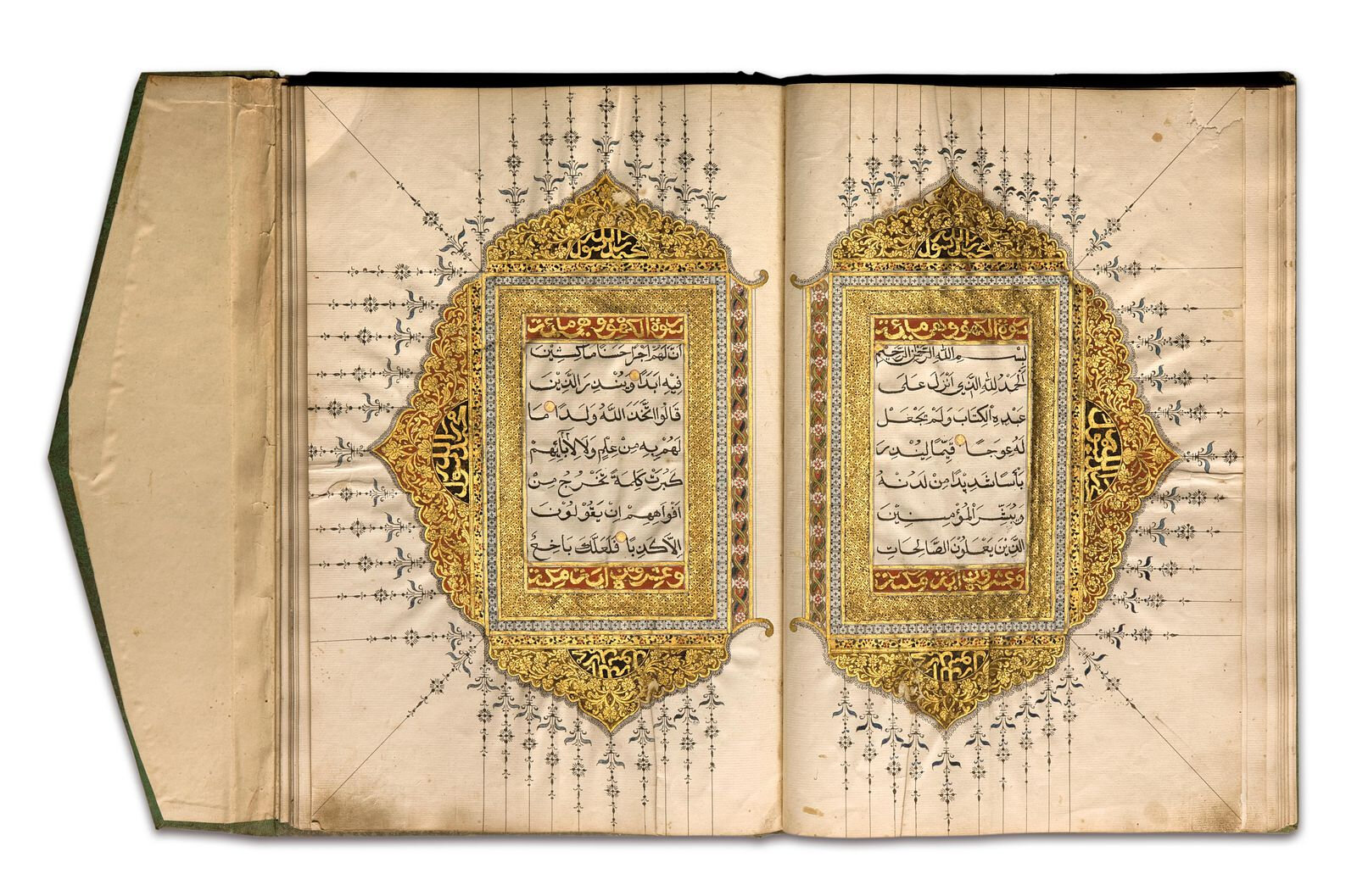
Double-page from the Qur'an manuscript from Bangkalan, made c. 1900. Art Gallery of South Australia

Bangkalan (Madurese: Bhângkalan, pronunciation: [ɓɤŋ.ka.lan]) is a town on the western coast of Madura Island in Indonesia, the government seat of the Bangkalan Regency.

== Tourism ==
Mount Jaddih is 10 kilometres from Bangkalan and can be accessed by a motorcycle to the mountain top to see Bangkalan town and Suramadu Bridge. The 500-hectare limestone hill of Mount Jaddih also offers a spring-water swimming pool for free. Other objects of interest to tourists near Bangkalan are a lighthouse from the Dutch colonial era (15 kilometers), Rongkang Beach (20 kilometers), and the religious site of Mount Geger (60 kilometers).

== Suramadu Bridge to Java ==
The Suramadu Bridge (Indonesian: Jembatan Suramadu), also known as the Surabaya–Madura Bridge, connects the south of Bangkalan Regency on Madura to the city of Surabaya on the mainland of Java.

== Climate ==
Bangkalan has a tropical monsoon climate (Köppen Am) with moderate to little rainfall from June to October and heavy rainfall from November to May.

Climate data for Bangkalan
| Month | Jan | Feb | Mar | Apr | May | Jun | Jul | Aug | Sep | Oct | Nov | Dec | Year |
|---|---|---|---|---|---|---|---|---|---|---|---|---|---|
| Mean daily maximum °C (°F) | 30.7 (87.3) | 30.8 (87.4) | 31.0 (87.8) | 31.6 (88.9) | 31.8 (89.2) | 31.5 (88.7) | 31.0 (87.8) | 31.6 (88.9) | 32.3 (90.1) | 33.2 (91.8) | 33.0 (91.4) | 31.3 (88.3) | 31.7 (89.0) |
| Daily mean °C (°F) | 27.2 (81.0) | 27.2 (81.0) | 27.3 (81.1) | 27.7 (81.9) | 27.7 (81.9) | 27.2 (81.0) | 26.6 (79.9) | 26.9 (80.4) | 27.5 (81.5) | 28.7 (83.7) | 28.6 (83.5) | 27.5 (81.5) | 27.5 (81.5) |
| Mean daily minimum °C (°F) | 23.8 (74.8) | 23.6 (74.5) | 23.6 (74.5) | 23.8 (74.8) | 23.6 (74.5) | 22.9 (73.2) | 22.3 (72.1) | 22.3 (72.1) | 22.8 (73.0) | 24.2 (75.6) | 24.3 (75.7) | 23.8 (74.8) | 23.4 (74.1) |
| Average rainfall mm (inches) | 289 (11.4) | 236 (9.3) | 252 (9.9) | 218 (8.6) | 164 (6.5) | 98 (3.9) | 54 (2.1) | 36 (1.4) | 33 (1.3) | 65 (2.6) | 141 (5.6) | 252 (9.9) | 1,838 (72.5) |
Source: Climate-Data.org
