= Suramadu Bridge =

Cable-stayed bridge across the Madura strait between Surabaya and Madura

Suramadu National Bridge Jembatan Nasional Suramadu
- View of the Suramadu Bridge
- Coordinates: 7°11′3″S 112°46′49″E
- Carries: Motor vehicles
- Crosses: Madura Strait
- Locale: East Java (Surabaya–Bangkalan Regency)
- Official name: Jembatan Nasional Surabaya–Madura

Characteristics
- Design: Cable stayed bridge Box girder bridge
- Total length: 5,438 m (17,841 ft)
- Width: 30 m (98 ft)
- Height: 146 m (479 ft)
- Longest span: 434 m (1,424 ft)
- Clearance below: 35 m (114.8 ft)

History
- Construction start: 20 August 2003; 23 years ago
- Opened: 10 June 2009; 17 years ago

Statistics
- Daily traffic: 26,737 (2018)
- Toll: Free

Location
- Interactive map of Suramadu National Bridge

The Suramadu Bridge (Indonesian: Jembatan Suramadu, Javanese: Kreteg Suramadu, Madurese: Tètè Suramadu; from the abbreviation of Surabaya–Madura Bridge) is a cable-stayed bridge between Surabaya on the island of Java and southern Bangkalan Regency on the island of Madura in Indonesia. Opened in June 2009, the 5.4-kilometre-long (3.4 mi) bridge is the longest in Indonesia and the second-longest in the Southern Hemisphere. It is the first bridge to cross the Madura Strait.

The cable-stayed portion has three spans with lengths 192 metres (630 ft), 434 metres (1,424 ft), and 192 metres (630 ft). The bridge has two lanes, an emergency lane, and a dedicated lane for motorcycles in each direction.

== History ==
=== Early history ===
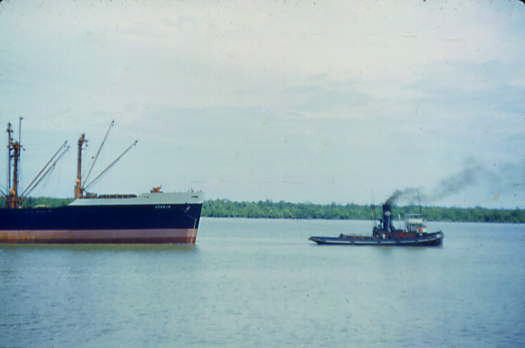
The Madura Strait in 1952

The idea of a bridge connecting Surabaya with Madura is said to have first been proposed in the early 1960s by the well-known Indonesian engineer Professor Sedyatmo from the Bandung Institute of Technology. Later, in the mid-1980s, there was renewed interest in the project when staff from the National Development Planning Bureau (Bappenas) met with Japanese aid donors to discuss the construction of a bridge. A pre-feasibility study was conducted in early 1990, and in December 1990, President Suharto appointed a team of ministers and advisers to consider plans for the bridge. Later, a consortium consisting of the Indonesian state-owned firm PT Jasa Marga and other Indonesian firms, along with Japanese firms Mitsubishi Corporation, Itochu, Shimizu, and the Long-Term Credit Bank, was established to proceed with the bridge.

=== Further developments ===
Suramadu Bridge at night

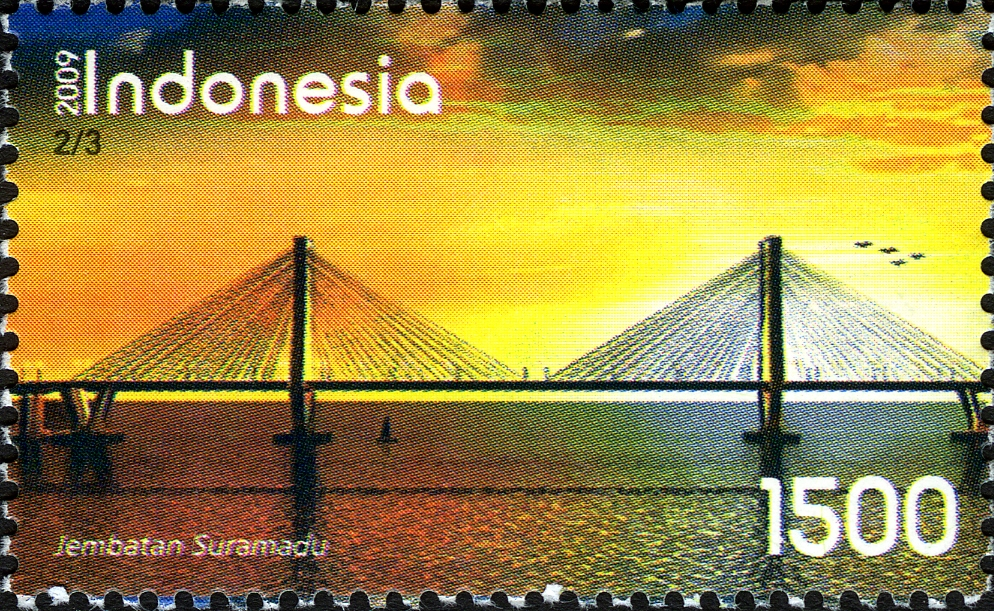
2009 stamp featuring the Suramadu Bridge

In 1997–98, a range of problems arising from the Asian financial crisis in Indonesia led to the suspension of activities. However, within a few years, the East Java Provincial Government took up a renewed interest in plans and 2000 announced that further initiatives would be made at the provincial level. These steps gained impetus when President Megawati issued a decree instructing ministers to take additional steps to support the bridge's construction and appoint PT Jasa Marga as the lead Indonesian firm for the project.

The bridge was built by a consortium of Indonesian companies PT Adhi Karya and PT Waskita Karya, working with China Road and Bridge Corp. and China Harbor Engineering Co. Ltd. The total cost of the project, including connecting roads, has been estimated at Rp4.5 trillion (US$445 million).

Construction began in August 2003. In July 2004, a girder collapsed, killing one worker and injuring nine others. Work on the bridge halted at the end of 2004 due to a lack of funds but was restarted in November 2005. The main span of the bridge was connected on 31 March 2009, and the bridge was opened to the public on 10 June 2009.

Within a week of the opening, it was discovered that nuts and bolts and maintenance lamps had been stolen and that there was evidence of vandalism of cables supporting the main span.

== Tariffs ==
As is often the case with public sector infrastructure facilities in Indonesia, there has been pressure to keep the tariffs for using the bridge low. Tolls were initially set at Rp30,000 (US$3 in 2009) for four-wheeled vehicles and Rp3,000 (US$0.30) for two-wheelers. However, in early 2016, it was announced that President Jokowi favored a 50% cut in the tolls to help promote the competitiveness of industries on the Madura side of the bridge.

No details were available as to how toll cuts would be funded. However, a spokesperson for the state-owned company PT Jasa Marga, which operated the bridge, said that the tariff reductions would not cause a problem for the operating firm itself because Jasa Marga was paid directly by the government to manage the bridge.

Starting on 27 October 2018, toll tariffs were abolished for all types of vehicles.

== Gallery ==
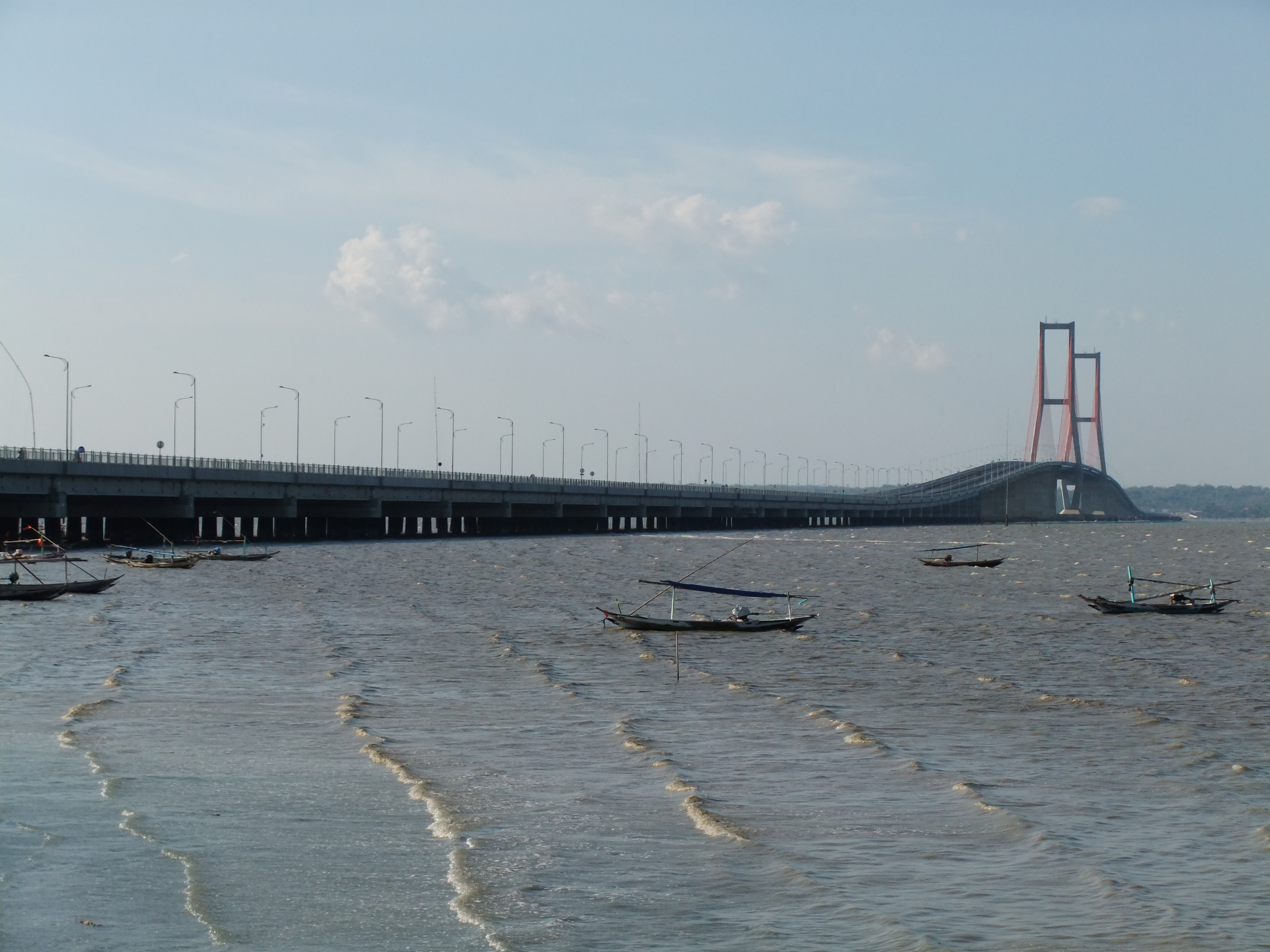

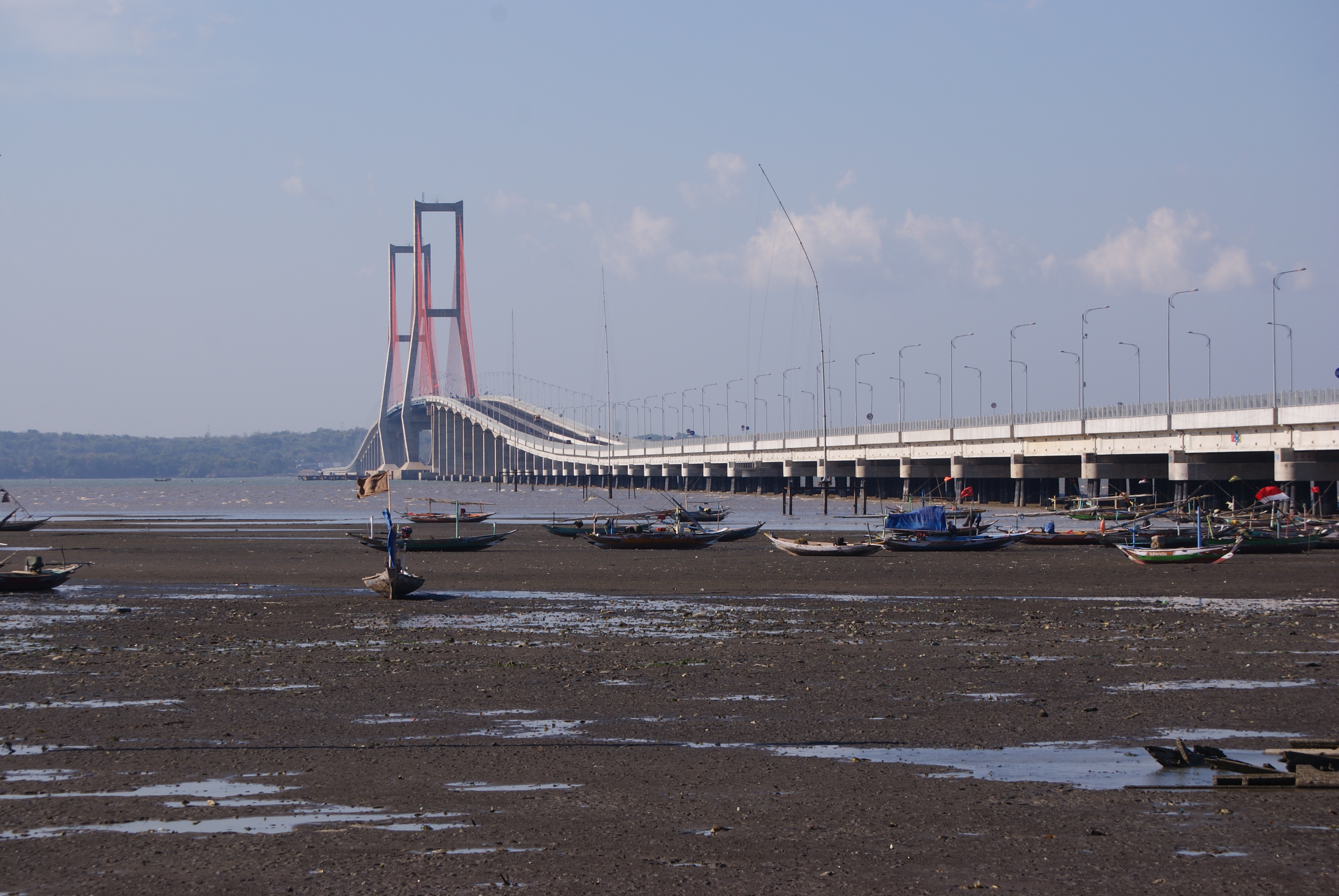

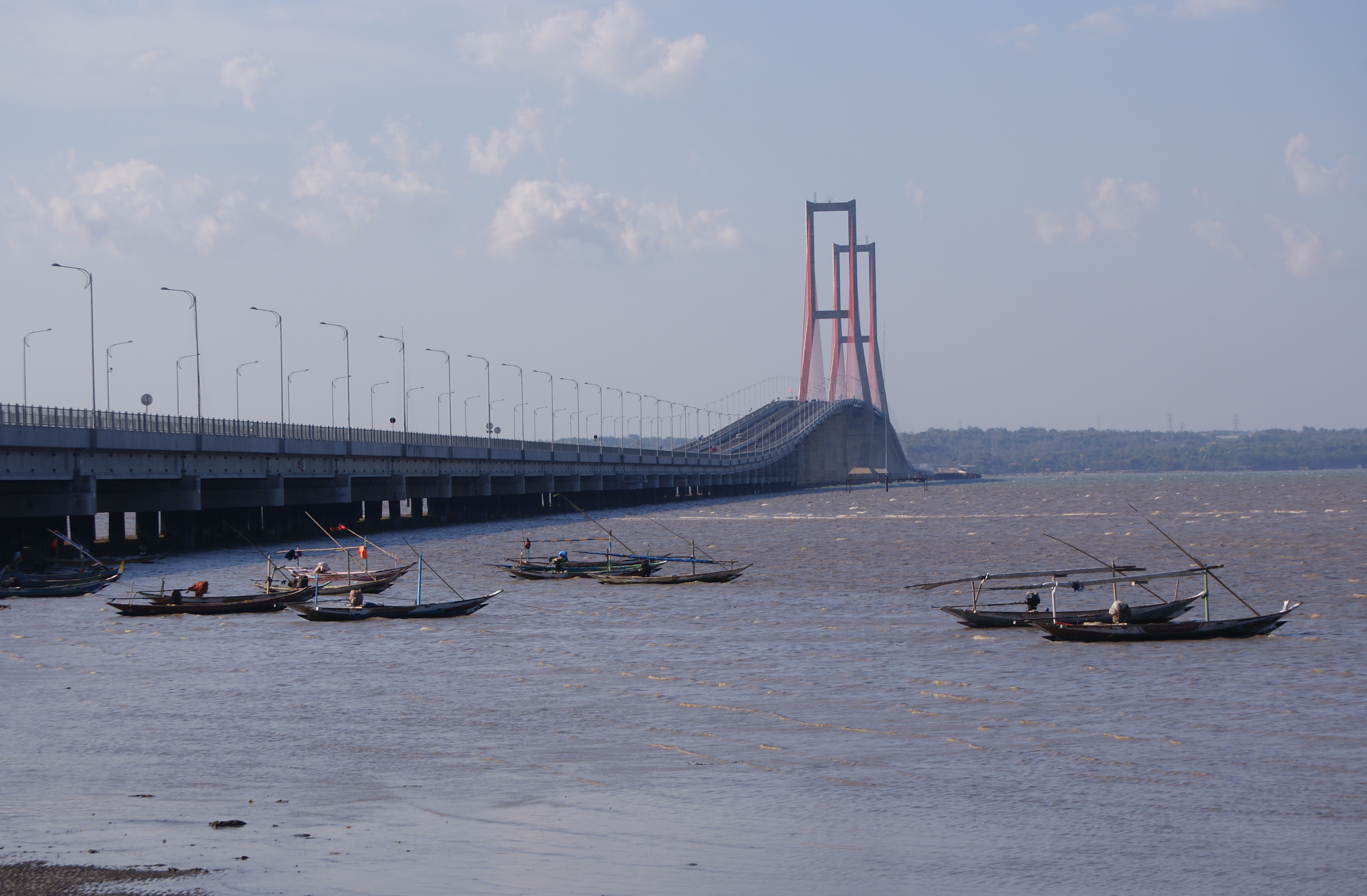

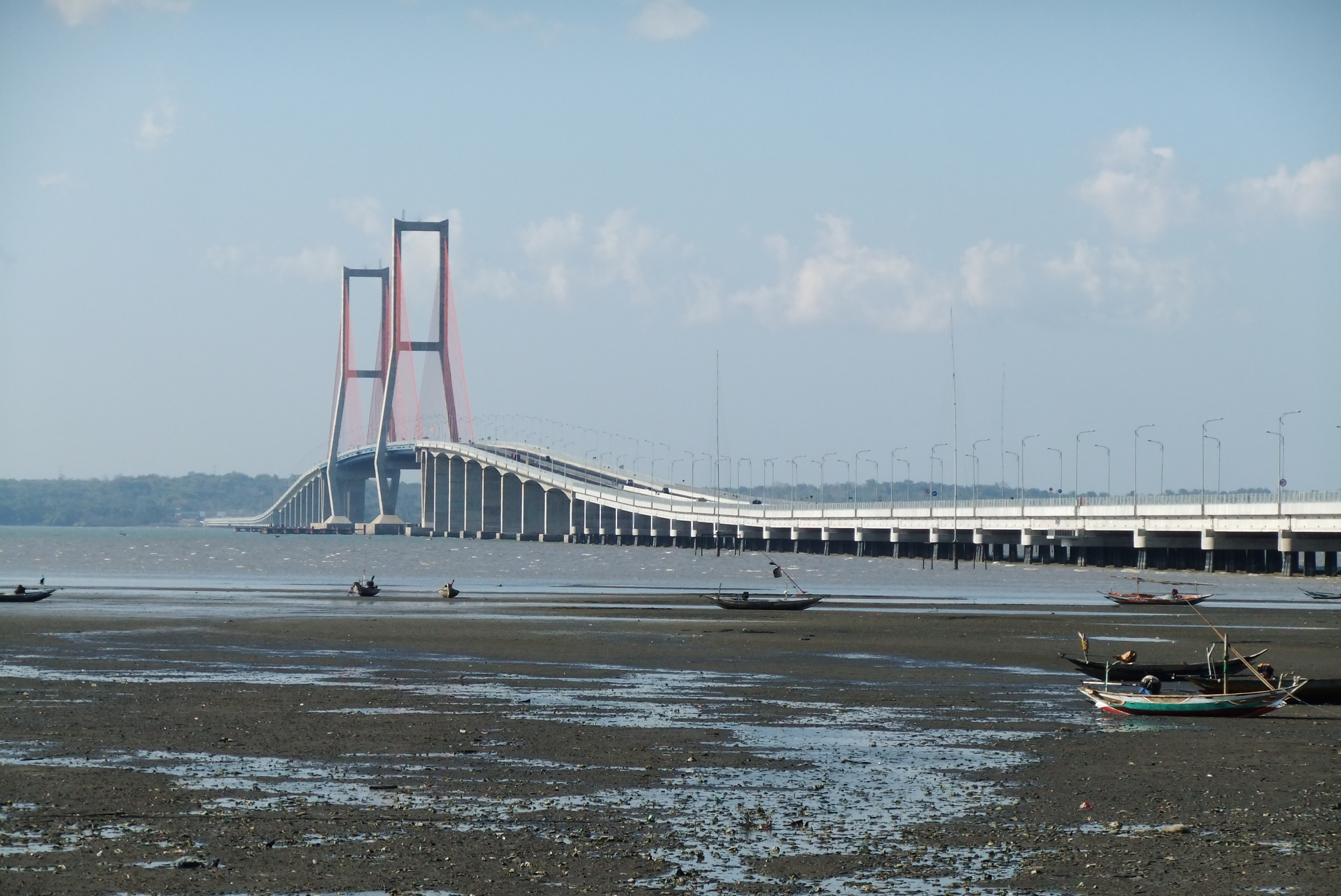

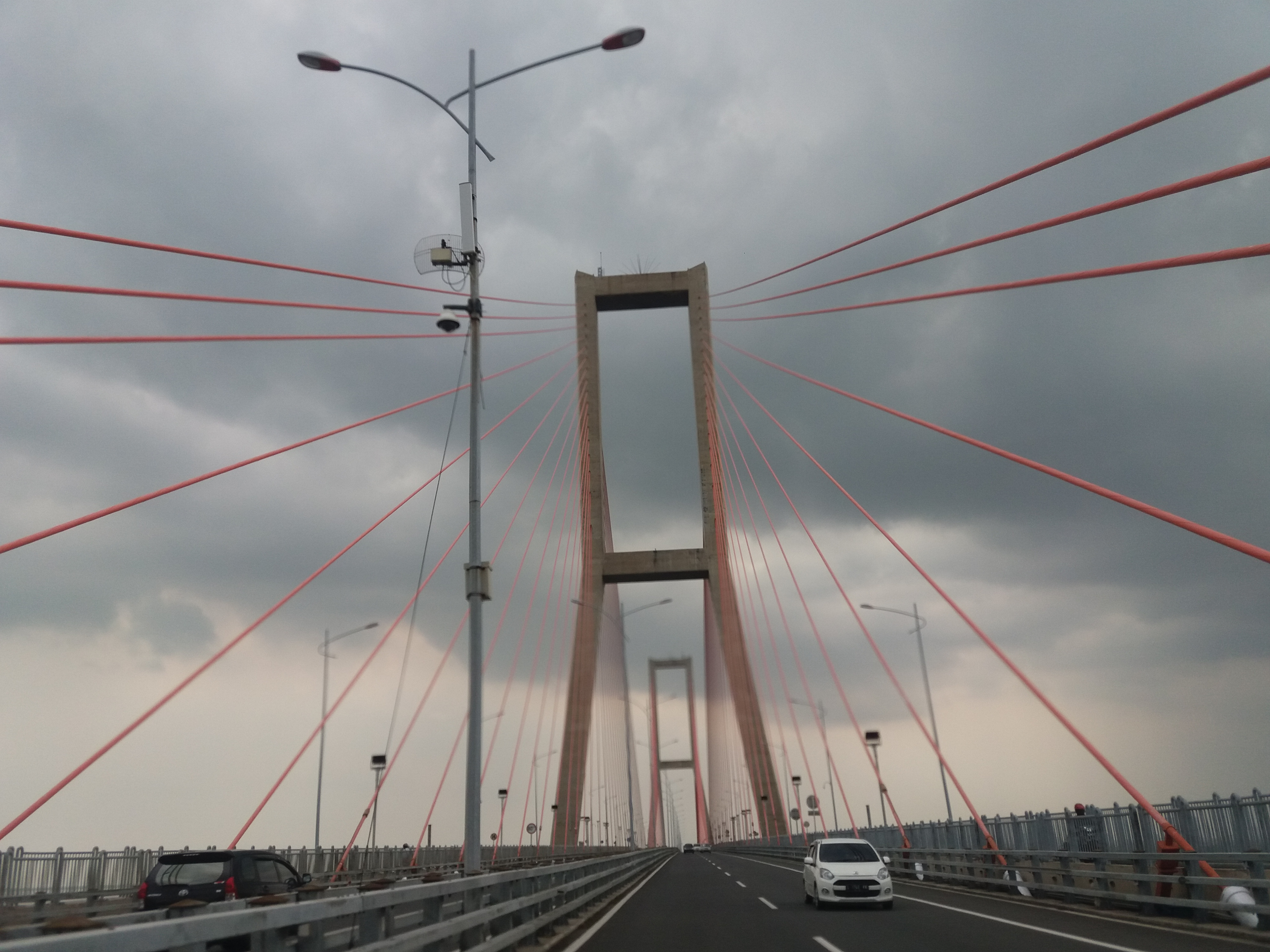

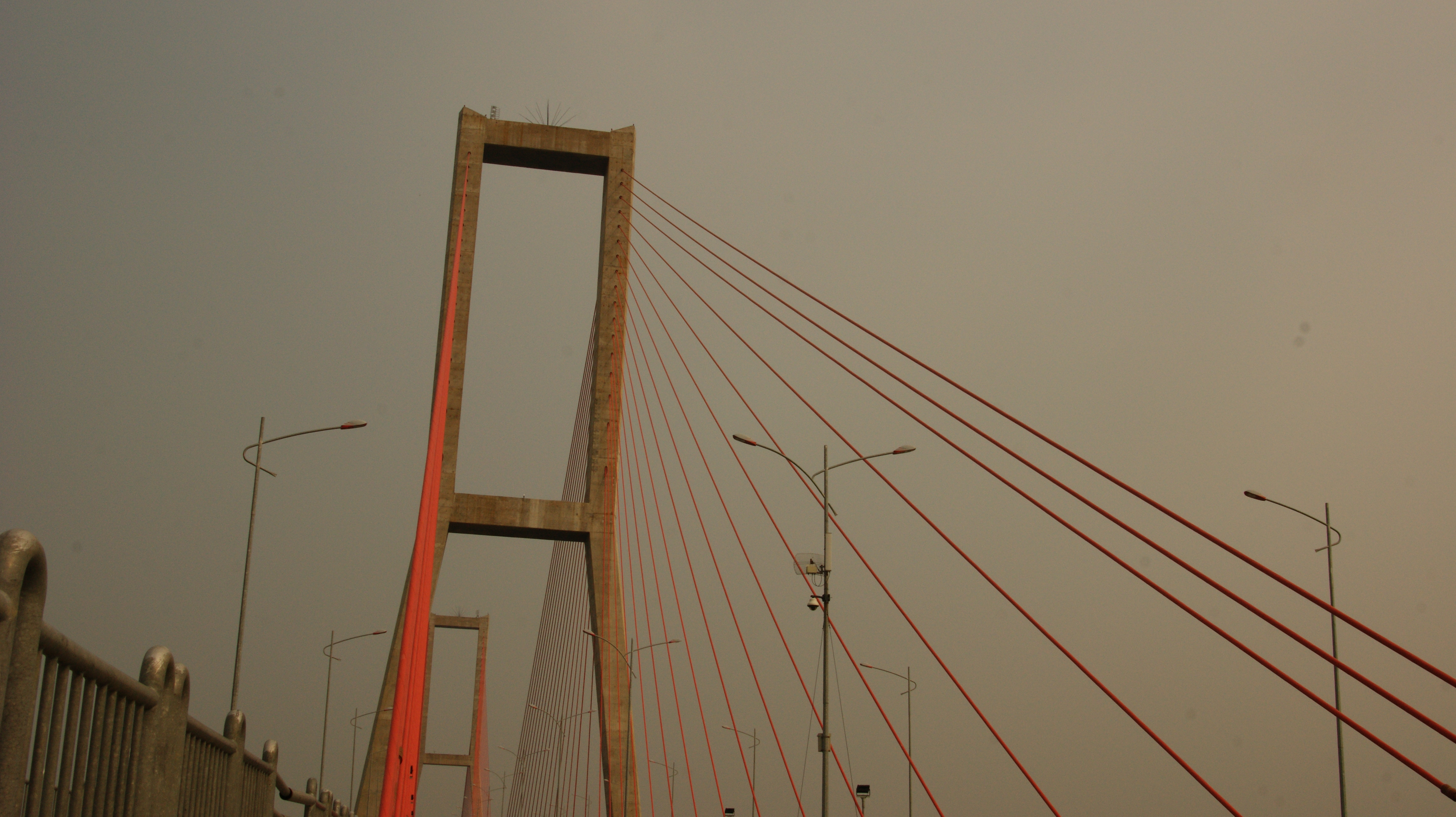

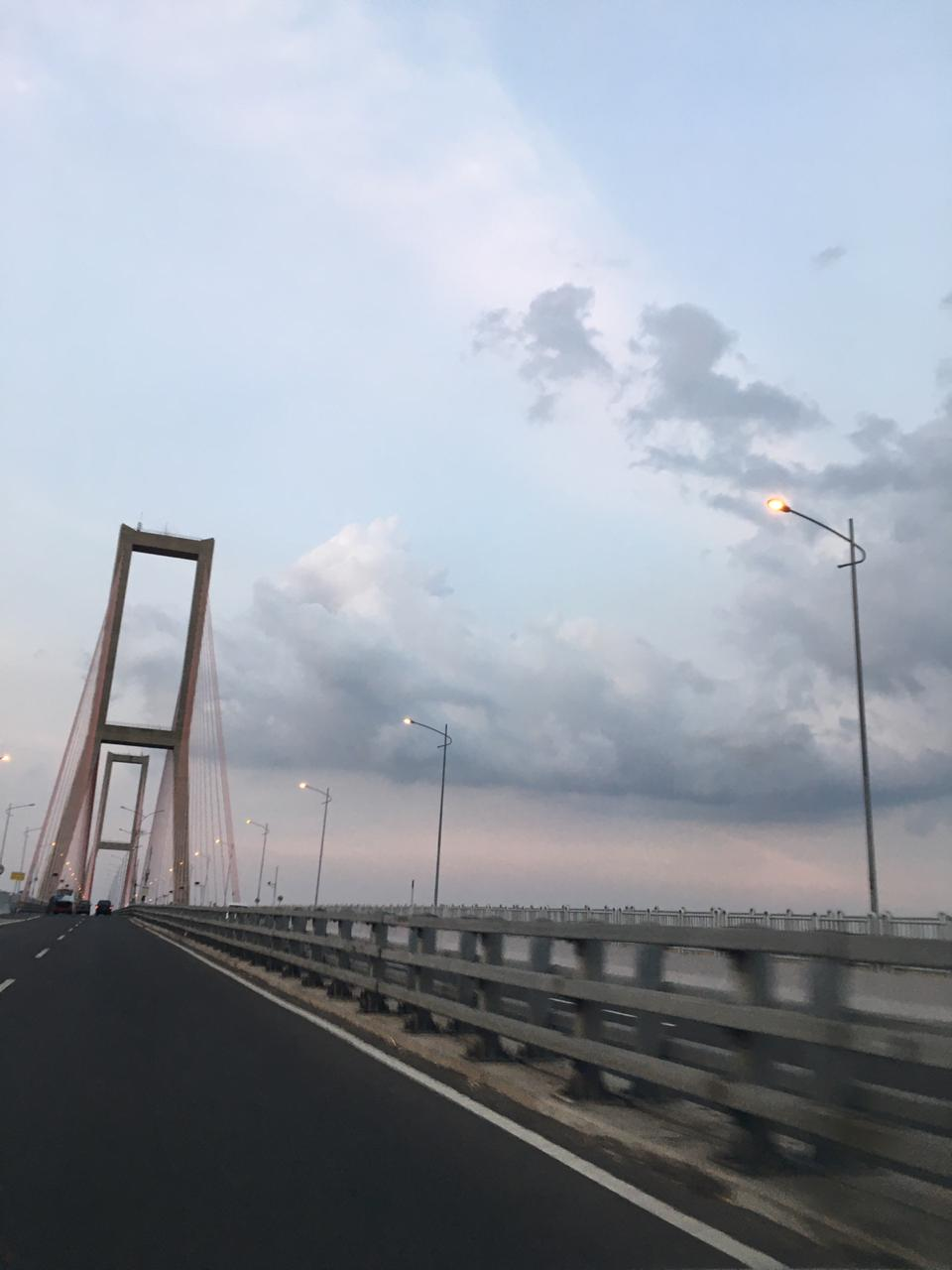

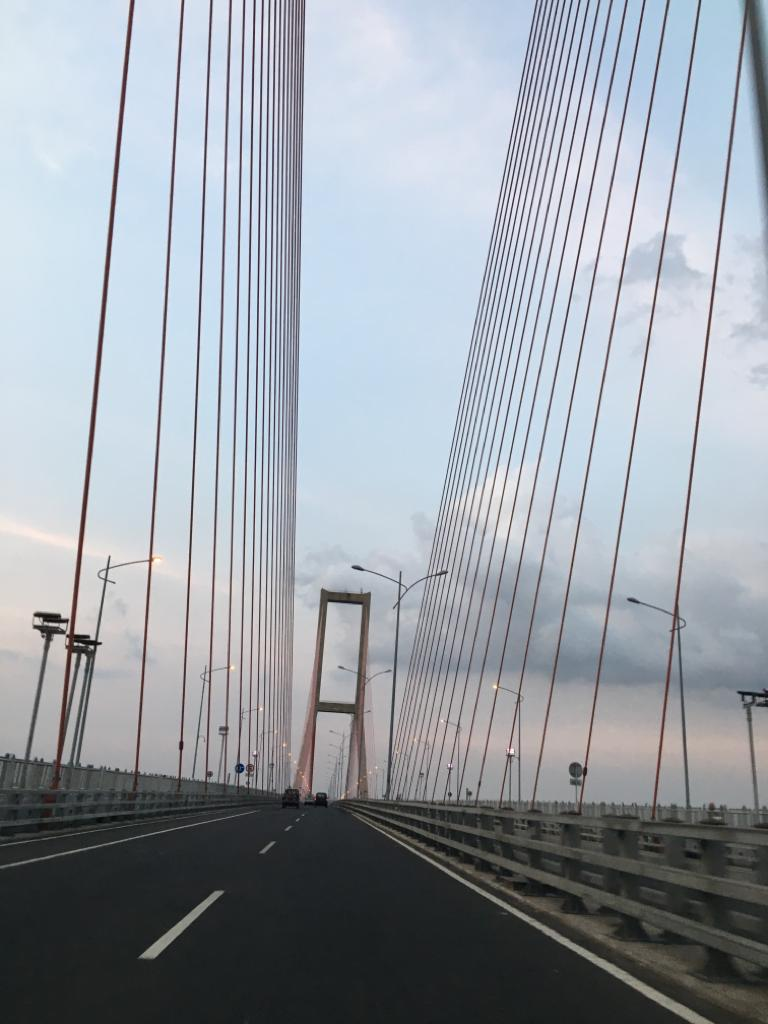

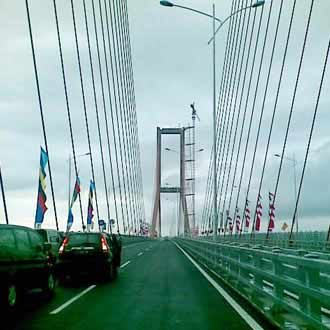

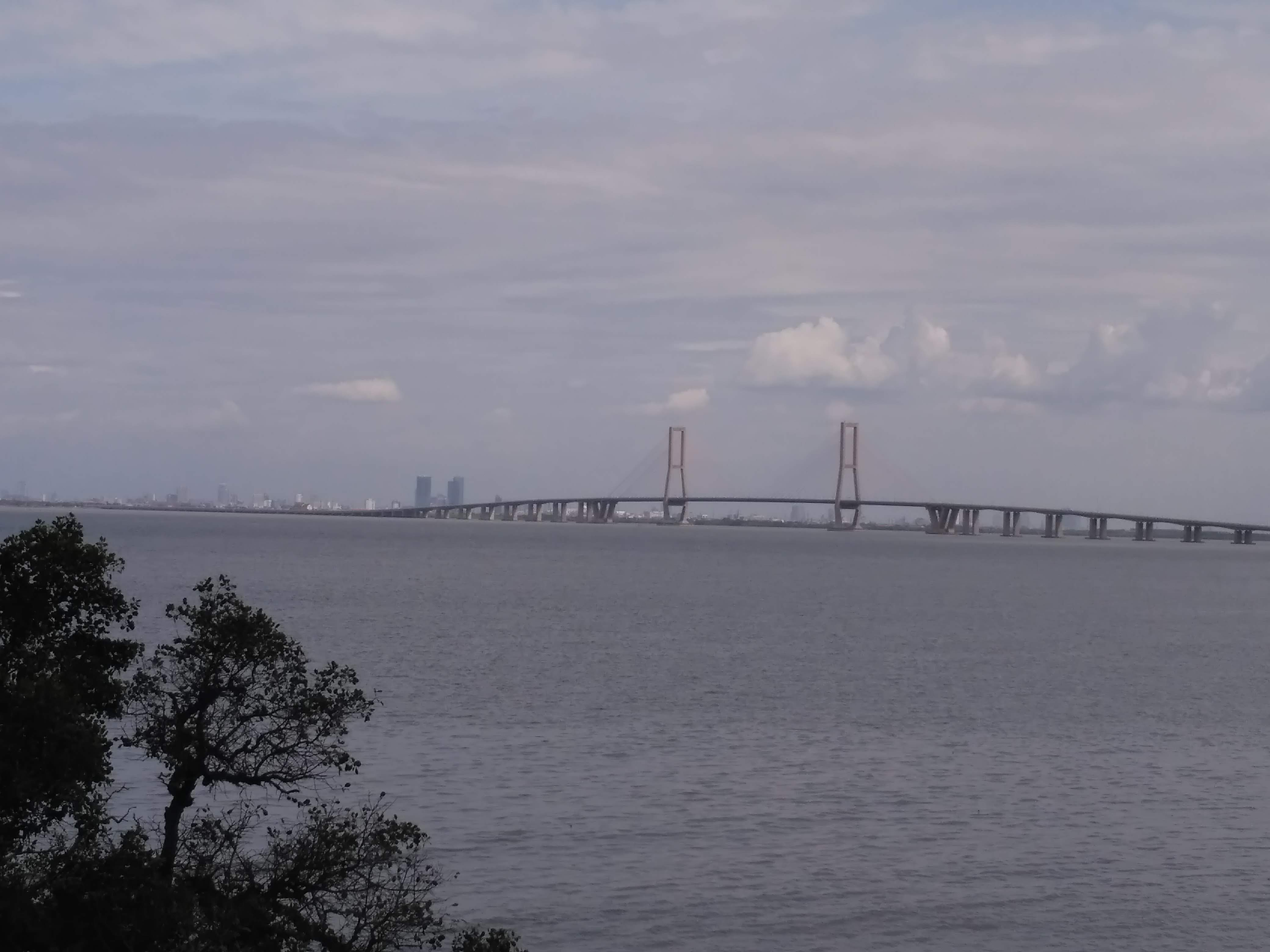

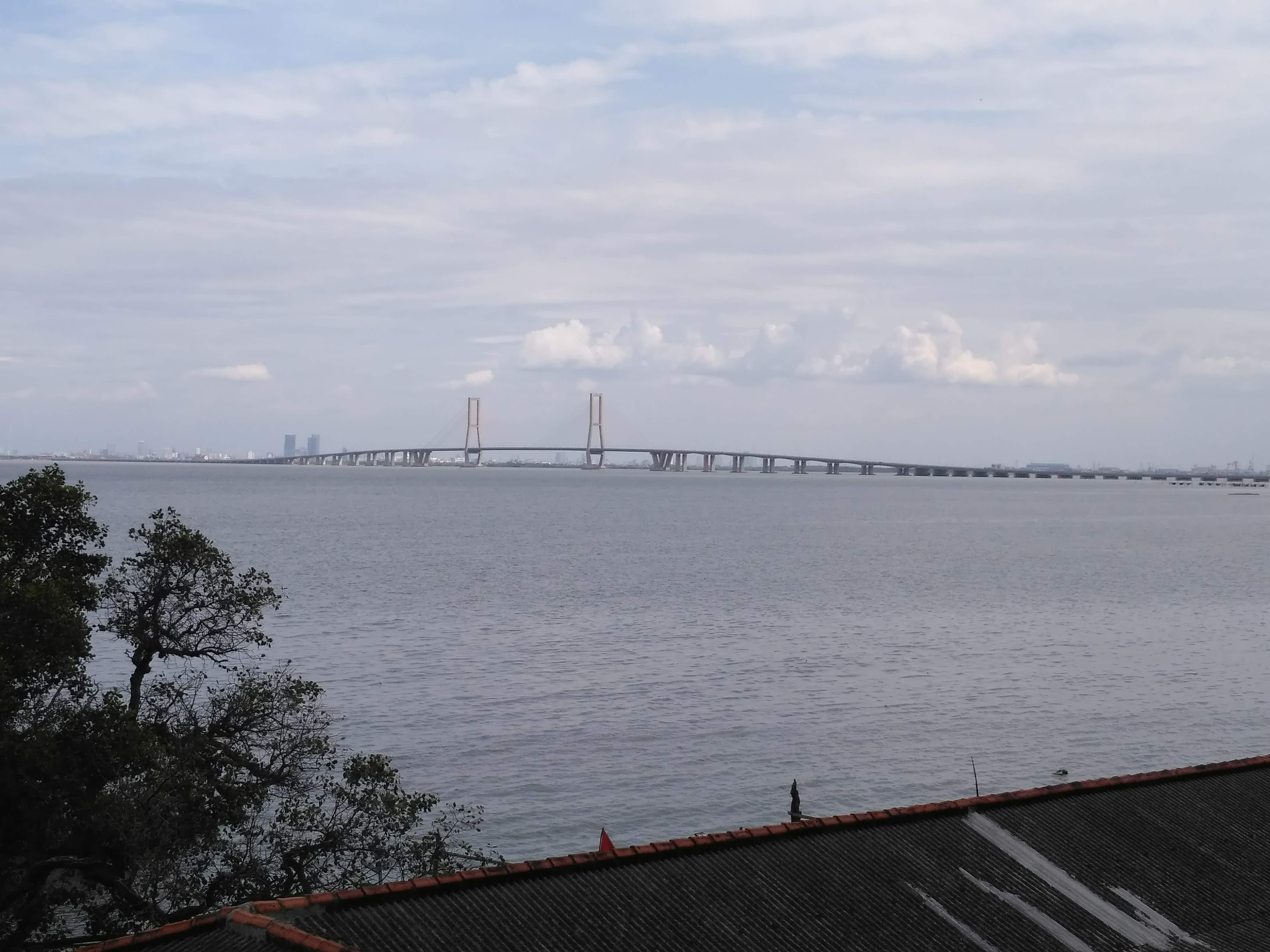

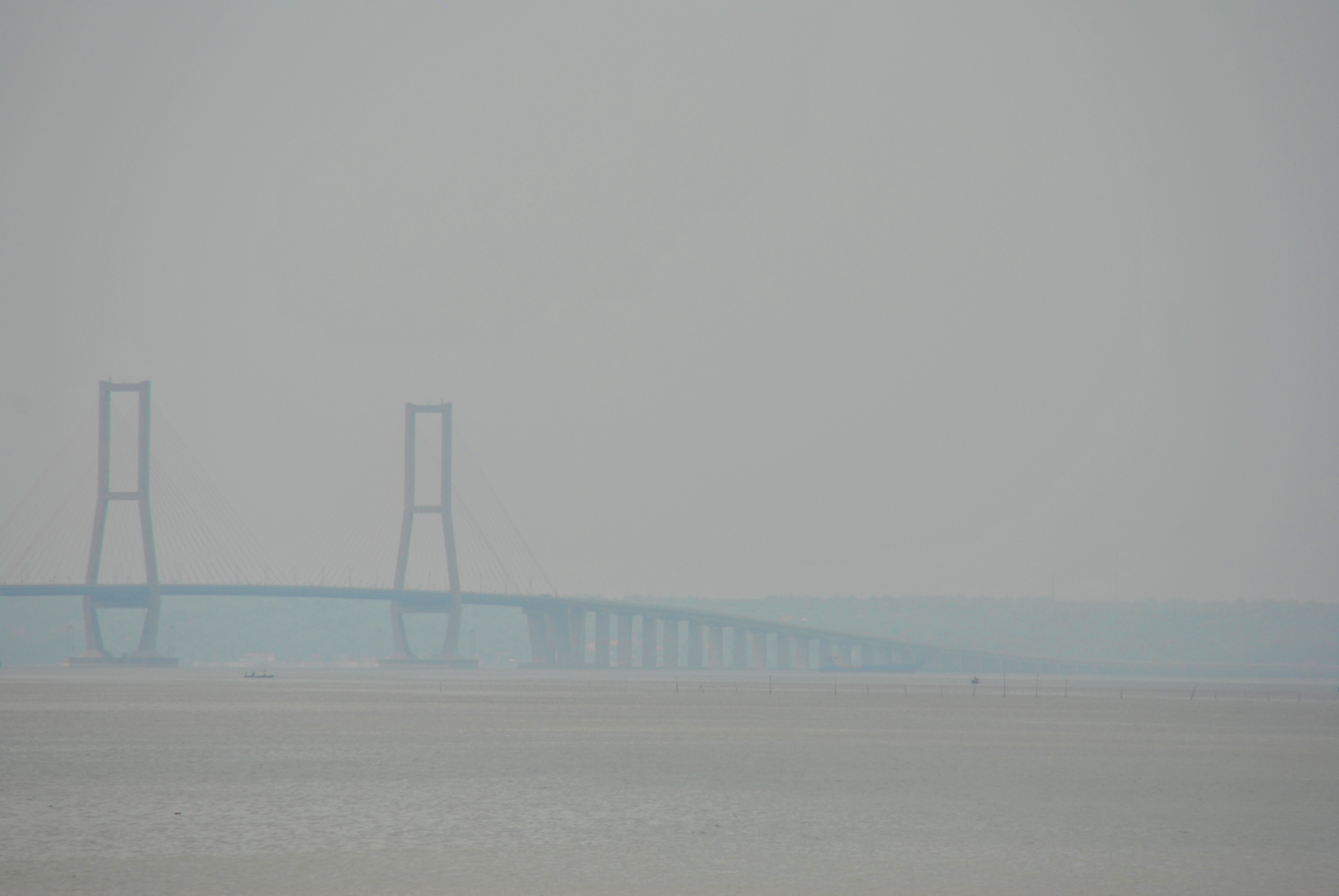

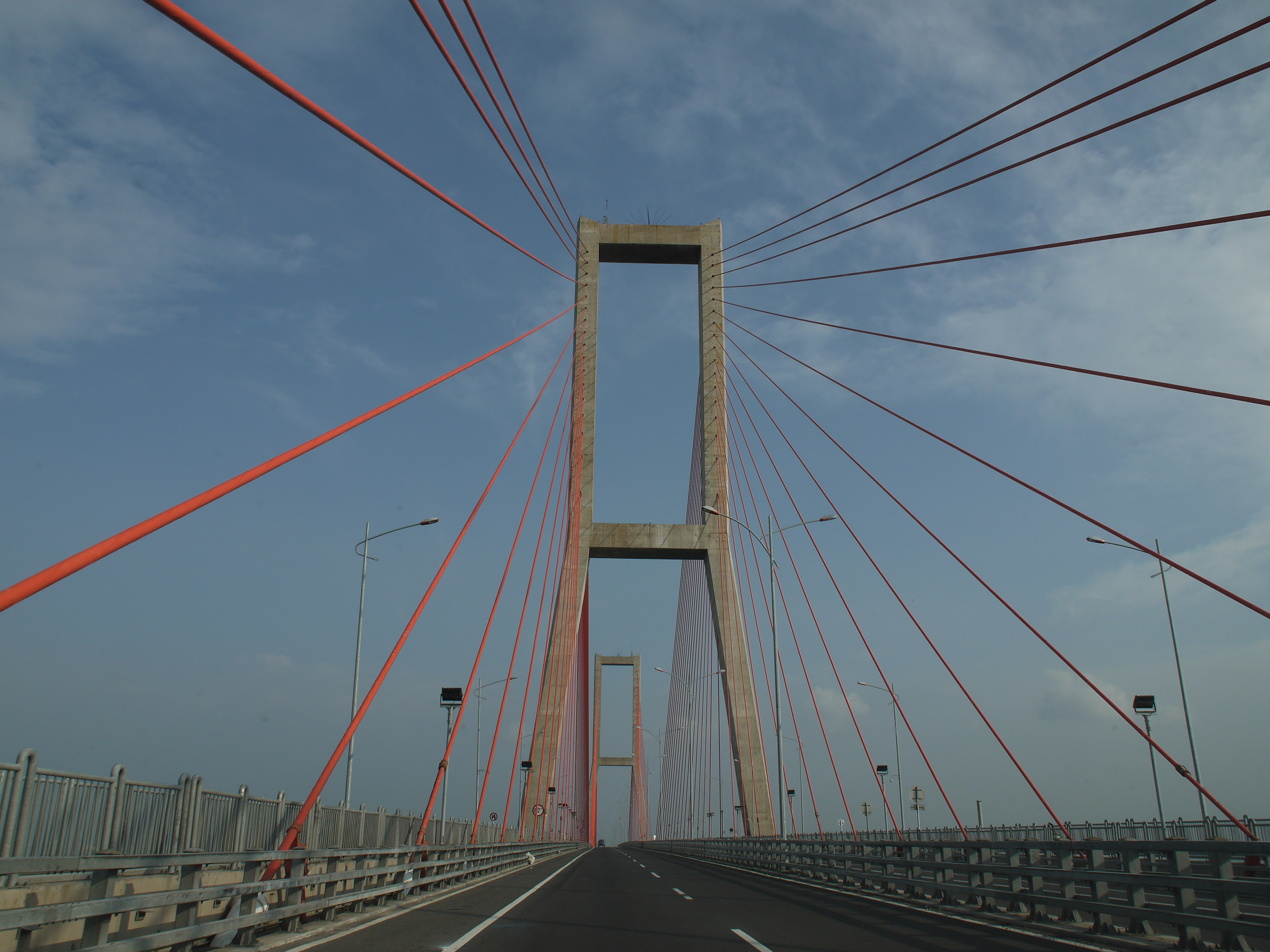

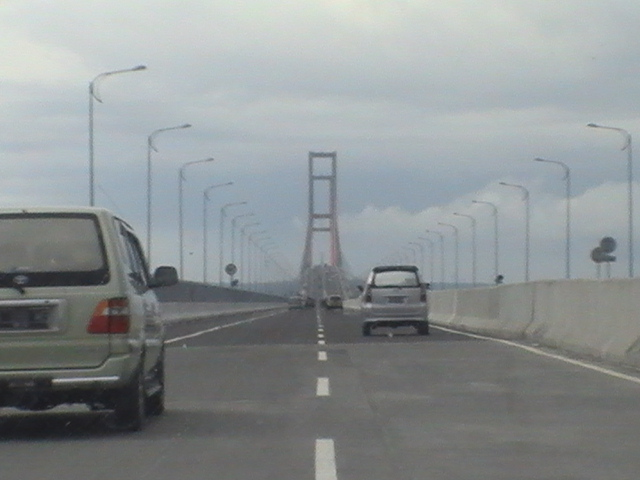

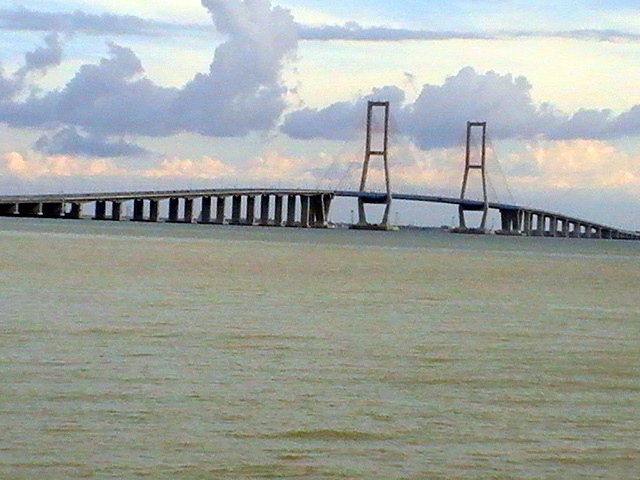

== See also ==
- List of longest bridges
