= Datong–Yuncheng Expressway =

Road in Shanxi, China

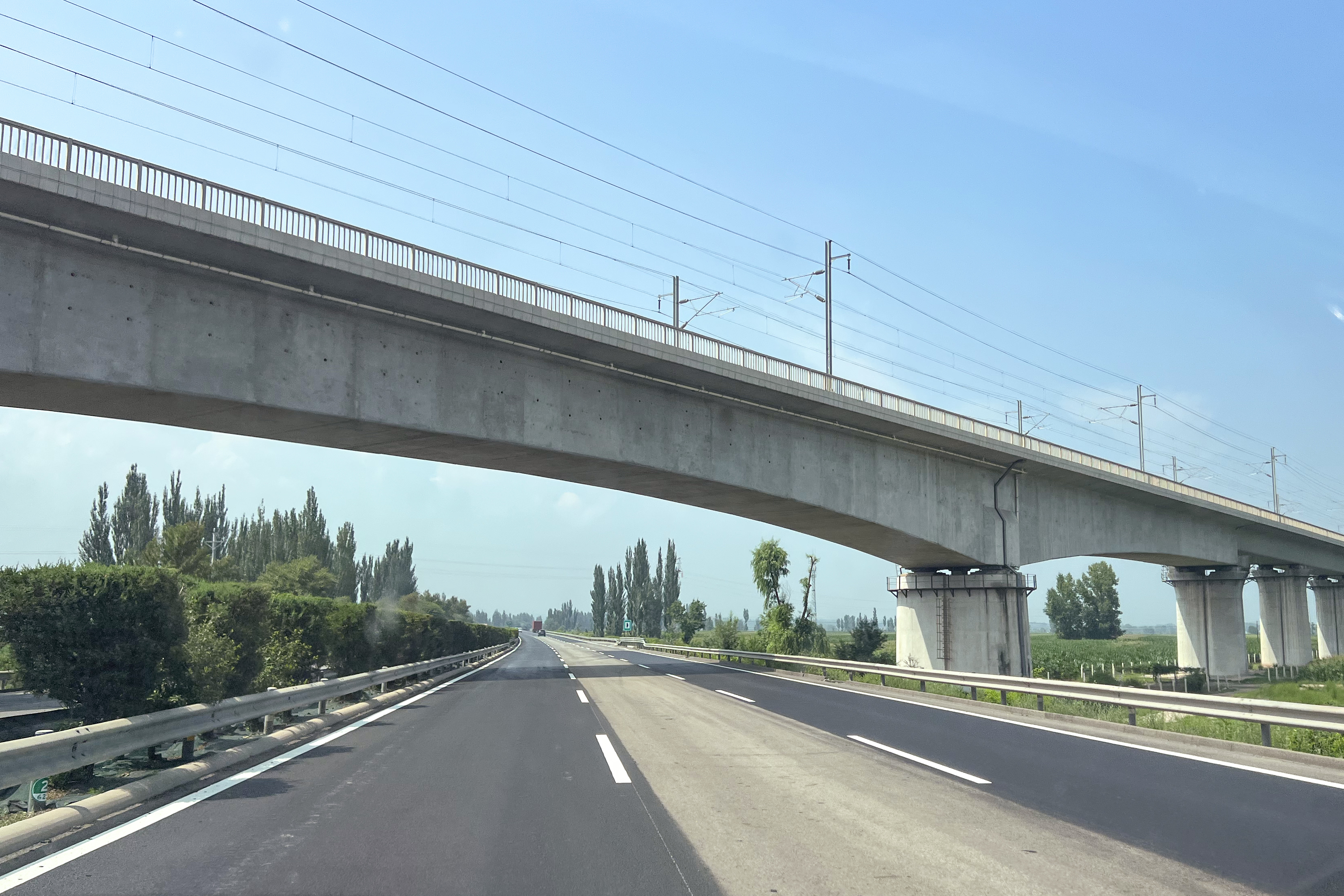
The Dyung expressway

Dayun Expressway (simplified Chinese: 大运高速公路; traditional Chinese: 大運高速公路; pinyin: Dàyùn Gāosù Gōnglù) is the largest expressway structure in China's Shanxi province.

It enters Shanxi as the Xuanda Expressway until approaching Datong (in northern Shanxi), becoming the Dayun Expressway afterwards. It ultimately ends at Rongcheng (in southern Shanxi).

The expressway passes through Datong, Shuozhou, Taiyuan, Lüliang, Jinzhong, Linfen, and Yuncheng. Thirty-one counties lie in its track.

It links with the Xuanda Expressway (heading toward Xuanhua and ultimately Beijing or Zhangjiakou), the Jiaofen Expressway (heading toward Fenyang), the Yunfeng Expressway (heading toward Yongji and Fenglingdu) and the Yunsan Expressway (heading toward Sanmenxia on the Yellow River).

The expressway passes through some interesting historical and scenic spots, such as Yanmen Pass, Mount Wutai, the old city of Pingyao, as well as many temples.
