= Hyang =

Spiritual entity in Java-Bali mythology

Calligraphy Javanese Script "Hyang"

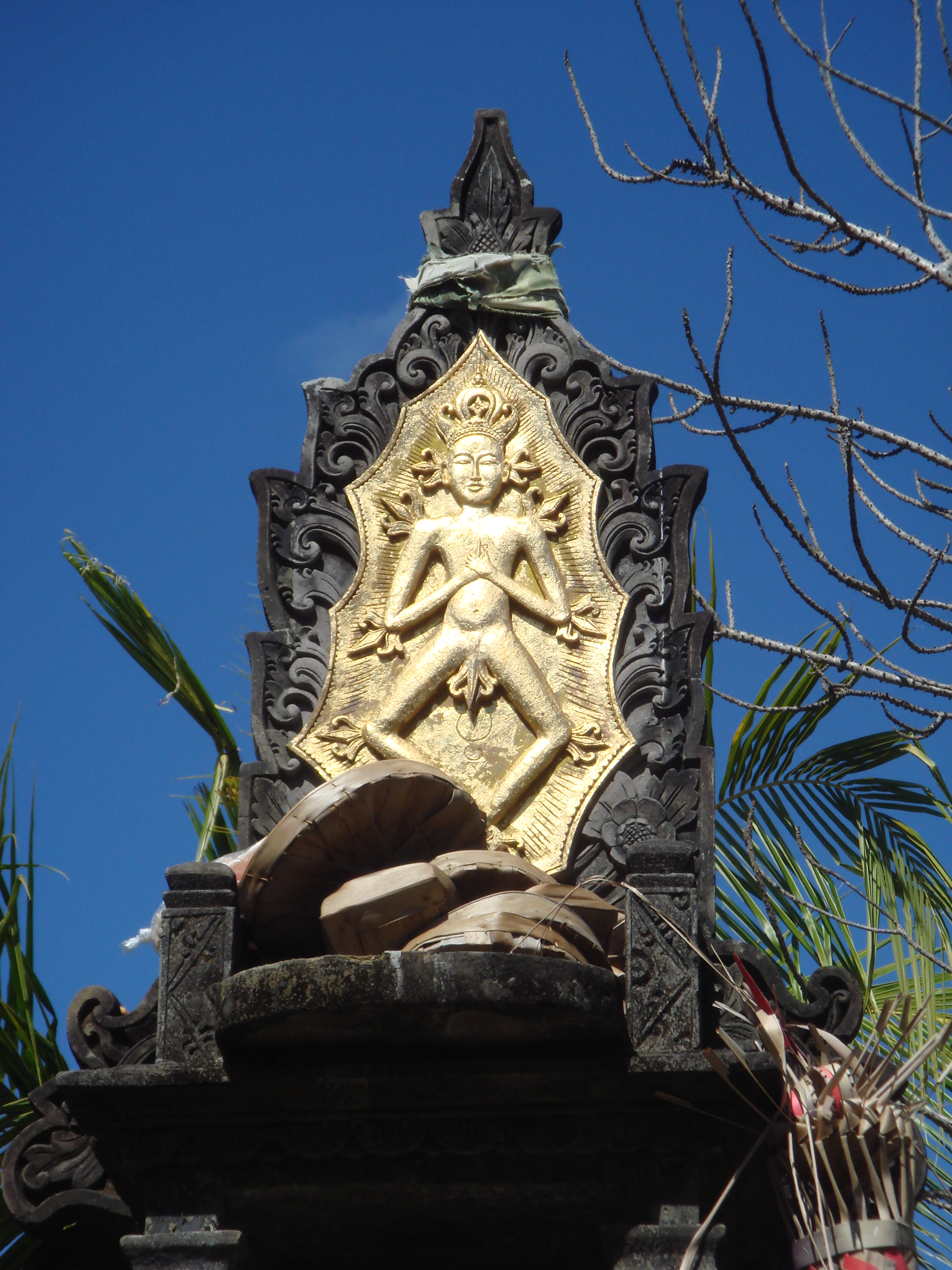
Acintya, Sang Hyang Widhi Wasa as supreme God in Balinist belief.

Hyang (Old Malay, Kawi, Sundanese, Javanese, and Balinese) is a representation of the supreme being, in ancient Java and Bali mythology. The spiritual entity can be either considered divine or ancestral. The reverence for this spiritual entity can be found in the folk religions of Java and Bali, such as the Sunda Wiwitan (a.k.a. Sundanism), Kejawen (a.k.a. non-monotheistic Javanism), Kapitayan (a.k.a. monotheistic Javanism), and Gama Tirta (a.k.a. Balinism). The realm where Hyang resides is called the Kahyangan, which is an Old Javanese term that means "the abode of Hyang", "part of Hyang", or "heaven".

The Old Sundanese manuscript Sanghyang Siksa Kandang Karesian, has stated that Hyang can be interpreted as "Omnipotence". Similarly, in the highest Sunda Wiwitan Spirituality, Hyang is also referred to as Sang Hyang Kersa (the Powerful).

Gama Tirta a.k.a. Balinism describes Hyang as a venerated spiritual existence that deserves special reverence. Hyang is commonly described as a sacred and luminous personal form. It is also referred to as the name for a spiritual existence that has supernatural powers, portrayed like the sun in a dream and often mentioned in a masculine form. A Hyang's arrival in a person's life is reputed to give great contentment and happiness to the person. Indonesians generally recognize this term to refer to the cause of beauty, the cause of all existence (creator), or simply to refer to God.

In Kejawen a.k.a. Javanism, the concept of the monotheistic God is described as the Sang Hyang Tunggal or Sang Hyang Wenang. Raden Ngabehi Ranggawarsita in his book, Paramayoga, detailed the names and designations for Javanese concept of God as the objective of worship, including Sang Hyang Suksma Kawekas, Sang Hyang Suksmesa, Sang Hyang Amurbeng Rat, Sang Hyang Sidhem Permanem, Sang Hyang Maha Luhur, Sang Hyang Wisesaning Tunggal, Sang Hyang Wenanging Jagad, Sang Hyang Maha Tinggi, Sang Hyang Manon, Sang Hyang Maha Sidhi, Sang Hyang Warmana, Sang Hyang Atmaweda, etc.

== Etymology ==
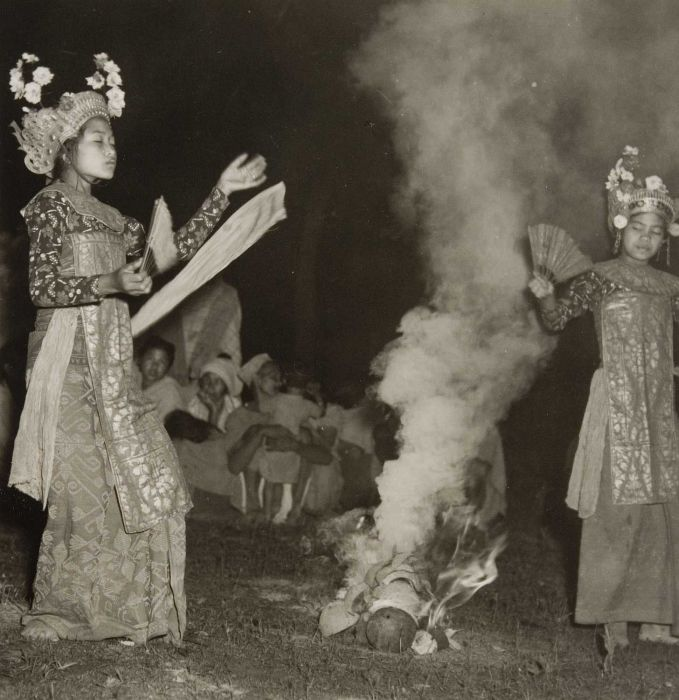
The sacred Balinese dance Sanghyang Dedari involved girls being possessed by hyangs.

The term Hyang is Old Javanese in origin. It means "god", "goddess", "deified being", or "divinity". It remains in Javanese: ꦲꦾꦁ, romanized: Hyang and Balinese: ᬳ᭄ᬬᬂ, romanized: Hyang, which bears the same meaning. In Old Sundanese, the term "nga-hyang" means "disappear" or "unseen". In its development, the term "hyang" became the root word for many terms that are still known and used in modern Indonesian:

- Reverence. If the word "hyang" is attached with prefixes attribute Sang-, Dang-, Ra-; to form the word Sanghyang, Danghyang, or Rahyang, the word itself is used to honor or revere gods or the deceased ancestors. For example, Sanghyang Sri Pohaci and Sang Hyang Widhi refer to gods, while the stylized name Rahyang Dewa Niskala refers to the name of the late king of the Sunda kingdom. The term Danghyang, Dhanyang, or Danyang conversely is used to refer to the guardian spirits of certain sacred or haunted places. The name of the Srivijayan empire founder, Dapunta Hyang Sri Jayanasa, also contained the name "hyang" which suggested that he possessed supernatural power.
- Place. Kahyangan — later kayangan, from the prefix-suffix conjugation ka-hyang-an — refers to the realm "where hyangs reside". Because of the belief that hyang prefer high places, some mountainous regions are considered as the abode of hyang. For example, Parahyangan refers to the mountainous region of West Java. Originating from a conjugated word para-hyang-an; para indicates plural, while the suffix -an shows the place, so Parahyangan can be interpreted as the abode of hyangs. The term kahyangan is also used to refer to a type of Pura or Balinese temple. For example, Pura kahyangan jagad is a Balinese temple located in the mountainous region as the counterparts of pura segara; a Balinese temple located by the sea. Dieng Plateau in Central Java also shared the same origin, it is from the conjugation di-hyang which also means "hyang's place".

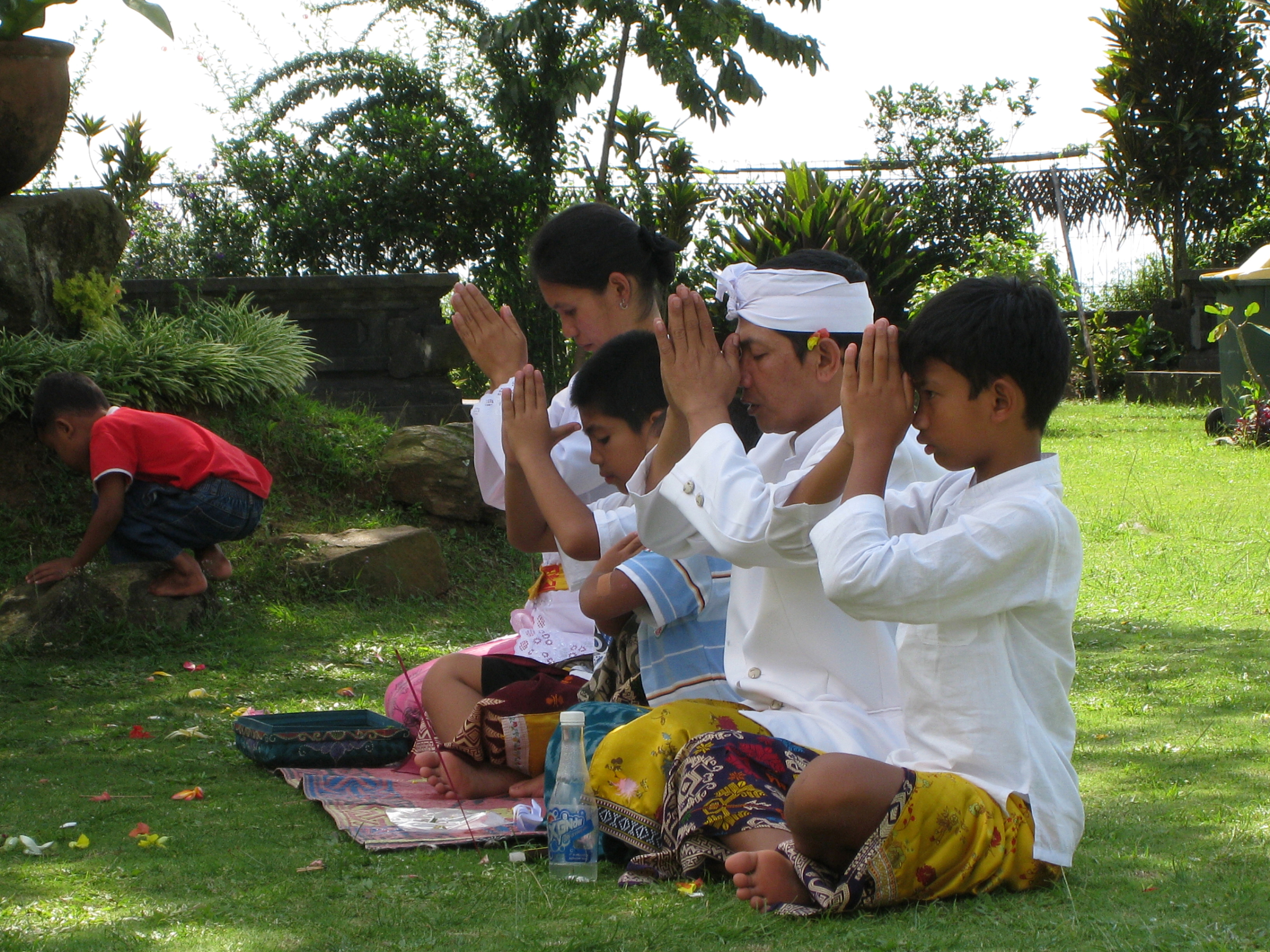
Kramaning sembah worship gesture during Hindu Balinese sembahyang at Pura Parahyangan Agung Jagatkarta

- Activity. The word sembahyang in Indonesian is synonymous with the Islamic salat ritual. It originated from the compound word sembah-hyang which means "worship the hyang". One of the instances of sembahyang is the Balinese Sanghyang Dedari, a sacred dance that involves pre-pubescent girls performing complex dances in a trance state. Through complex rituals to summon the spirits, it is believed that the spirits possessed the girls and manifested in their dance. Another example of the ritual is the Sanghyang Jaran, a Balinese version of the Kuda Lumping dance ritual that also involves a form of spirit possession.

== Origin ==
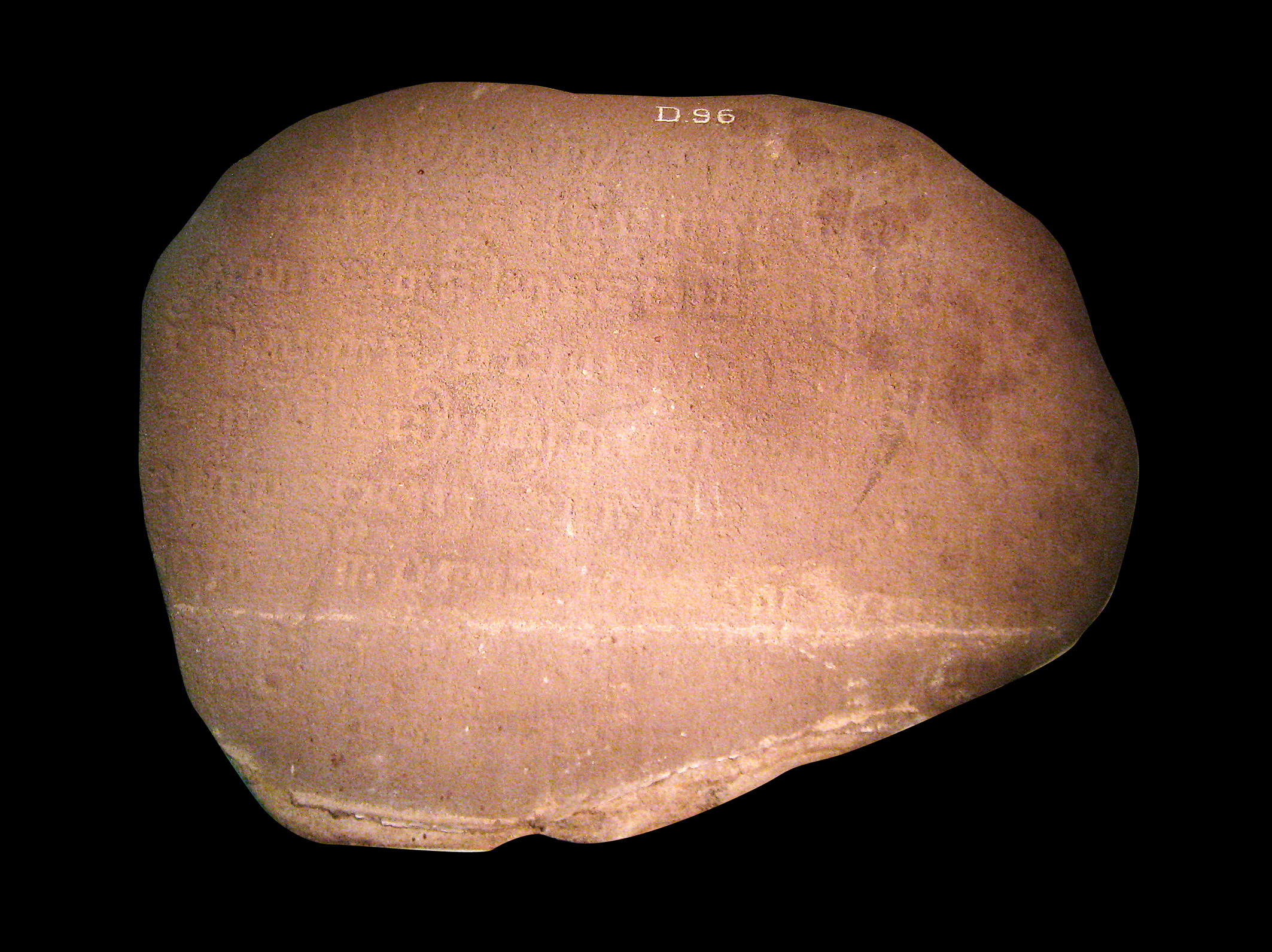
Sanghyang Tapak inscription from West Java dated 952 saka (1030 CE) mentioned Sanghyang Tapak sacred sanctuary believed to be the abode of hyang spirits

The term hyang, now widely associated with Sunda Wiwitan, Kejawen, and Balinism, developed in ancient Java and Bali more than a millennium ago. This term has its roots in the traditional animism and dynamism in the beliefs of indigenous Indonesians native to the Indonesian archipelago. Native pre-Hindu, pre-Buddhist, and pre-Islamic Indonesians have venerated and revered ancestral spirits. They also believed that some spirits may inhabit certain places such as large trees, stones, forests, mountains, or sacred places. The hyang concept had indigenously developed in the Indonesian archipelago and is not considered to have originated from Indian dharmic religions.

Before the adoption of Hinduism, Buddhism, and Islam, the natives of the Indonesian archipelago believed in powerful but unseen spiritual entities that could be both benevolent and malevolent. They also believed that the deceased ancestor had not gone away or disappeared completely. The ancestral spirit may gain god-like spiritual power and remain involved in their offspring’s worldly affairs. That is why the veneration and reverence to honor ancestors is an important element in the belief system of native ethnic groups, such as Nias, Dayak, Toraja, and Papuan ethnic groups, as well as many ethnic groups in Indonesia.

In ancient Sundanese, Javanese, and Balinese societies, this unseen spiritual entity is identified as "hyang". These ancestral divine spirits are believed to inhabit high places, such as mountains, hills, and volcanoes. These mountainous regions are considered sacred realms, as the abode of gods and the resting place for the soul of the ancestors.

Several ancient Indonesian inscriptions dated from the Hindu-Buddhist period (8th to 15th century) mentioned Hyang either as the name of the sanctuary or the name of a deity revered in multiple temples.

== Characteristics ==
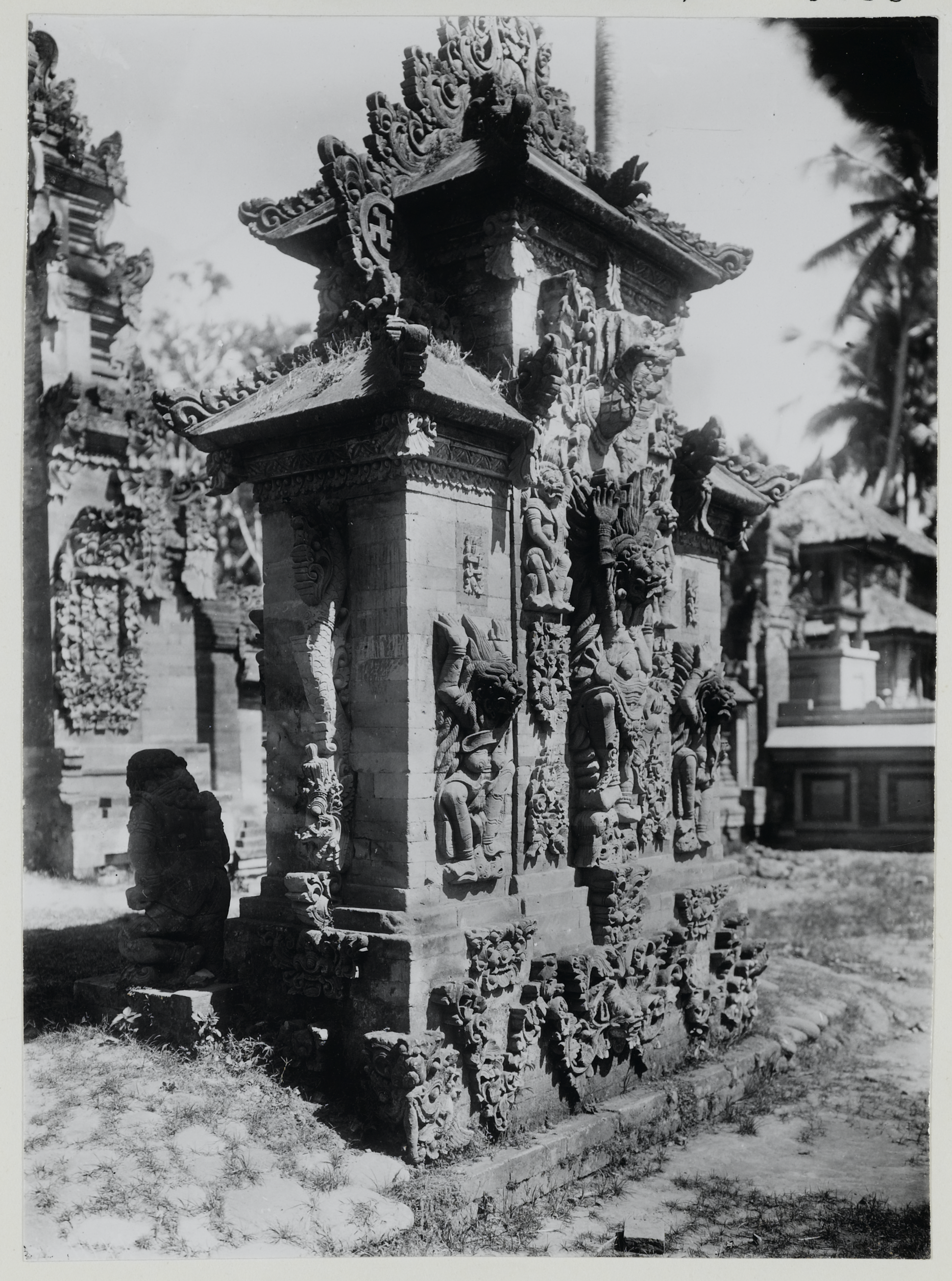
Aling-aling obstruction structure behind candi bentar split gate in Pura Dharma Sabha in Badung, Bali

"Hyangs" are said to only move in straight lines. Accordingly, traditional Balinese buildings have a wall called an aling-aling just inside the doorway, which keeps the spirits out because they only move in straight lines, and hence bounce off. Similar walls can be seen at the entrance of some Javanese cemeteries. Parallel beliefs are found in other spiritual traditions, as in British corpse roads.

== Hyang in native Indonesians' religions ==
The concept of hyang can be situated in native Indonesian religions in several ways:

- Balinism: It is Sang Hyang Widhi, the almighty God, the source of goodness brought by the Gods. Identified with Almighty Lord Paramasiwa.
- Javanese Buddhism: It is Sanghyang Adi Buddha, the law of nature that continues to exist, a so-called God that cannot be forgotten, where his Dharma was discovered by Gautama Buddha.
- Sunda Wiwitan: Recognized as the almighty God in the name of Sang Hyang Kersa, the embodiment of Maha Adhi Parabrahman in Hinduism belief.
- Islam Nusantara: According to the teachings of Sunan Kalijaga (Tuban Javanese missionary man), the Sang Hyang is the archipelagic ancestor of Sang Hyang Adam, Sang Hyang Sita (prophet Seth), Sang Hyang Wanuh (prophet Noah), Sang Hyang Jawith (Japheth, son of Noah), Sang Hyang Jawana (believed as progenitor of the Javanese), Sang Hyang Jawata (another progenitor of the Javanese), Sang Hyang Bathara Guru, Sang Hyang Ismaya, Sang Hyang Bathara Wisnu, and so on, until the deceased parents are personified as the spiritual entity united with Sang Hyang.

== See also ==
- Balinism
- Indonesian Esoteric Buddhism
- Hinduism in Java
- Javanism
- Kaharingan
- Sunda Wiwitan
- Aitu
- Anito
- Atua
- Kami, similar concept in Japanese Shinto faith
- Kupua
- Shen, similar concept in Chinese folk religion
- Taotao Mona
