= Saluan =

Saluan may refer to:

- Saluan people, an ethnic group of Sulawesi, Indonesia
- Saluan language, a language spoken by the Saluan people
