= Native Indonesians =

Term describing indigenous peoples of Indonesia

Pribumi Indonesia
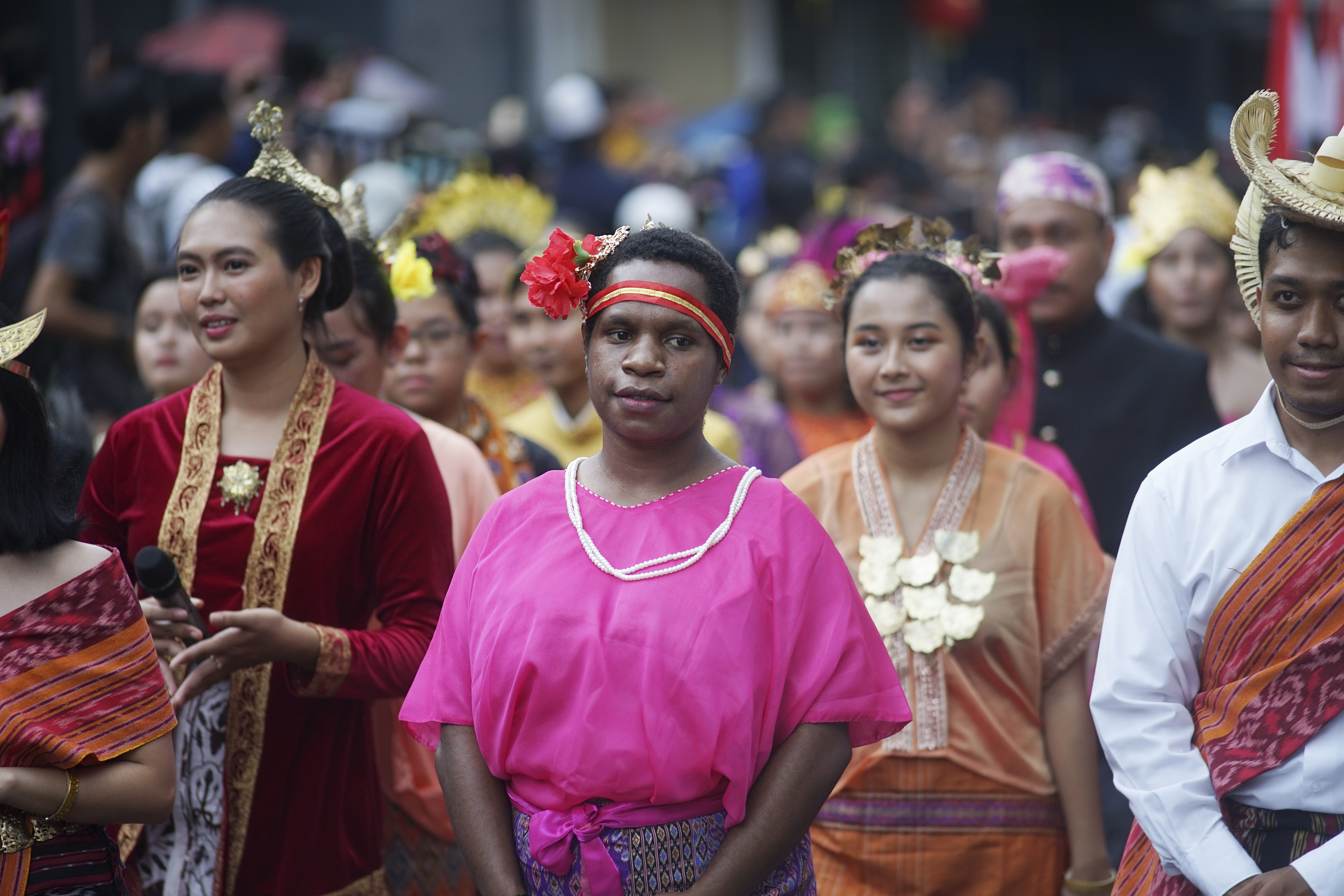
- Indonesians wearing their indigenous costume during cultural carnaval

Total population
- More than 300 million Including Indonesian ancestry c. 270 million Indonesia 2020 census c. 210 million Worldwide; 2006 estimate

Regions with significant populations
- Indonesia c. 270 million: Malaysia (Indonesian Malaysians); Netherlands (Indo people); Saudi Arabia (Indonesian Saudis); Singapore (Indonesian Singaporeans); South Africa (Cape Malays); Taiwan; Hongkong; United States; United Arab Emirates; Suriname (Javanese Surinamese); Australia; Brunei; Japan; Philippines; South Korea; Sri Lanka (Sri Lankan Malays); China; Qatar; Bahrain; Germany; Canada; etc.

Languages
- National language Indonesian; Regional language Javanese, Sundanese, Malay, Madurese, Minangkabau, Betawi, Banjarese, Batak, Balinese, Buginese, etc.

Religion
- Majority; Islam 87.15% Minorities; Christianity 10.44% (Protestantism 7.37% and Roman Catholicism 3.07%) · Hinduism 1.66% · Buddhism, Confucianism, and indigenous beliefs 0.75% (2025)

Related ethnic groups
- Malaysians • Filipino • East Timorese • Papua New Guineans

Native Indonesians, also known as Pribumi (lit. 'first on the soil'), are Indonesians whose ancestral roots lie mainly in the Indonesian archipelago and who belong to various ethnic groups, with the majority tracing their origins to Austronesian and Melanesian lineages. In contrast to pribumi are Indonesians with known foreign ancestry, such as Chinese Indonesians, Arab Indonesians, Indian Indonesians, Japanese Indonesians, and Indo-Europeans (Eurasians).

== Etymology and historical context ==
The term pribumi was popularized after Indonesian independence as a respectful replacement for the Dutch colonial term inlander (normally translated as "native" and seen as derogatory). It derives from Sanskrit terms pri (before) and bhumi (earth, land, or soil).

Following independence, the term was normally used to distinguish indigenous Indonesians from citizens of foreign descent (especially Chinese Indonesians). Common usage distinguished between pribumi and non-pribumi. Although the term is sometimes translated as "indigenous", it has a broader meaning than that associated with Indigenous peoples.

The term WNI keturunan asing (with WNI meaning "Indonesian citizen" and keturunan asing meaning "foreign descent"), sometimes just WNI keturunan or even WNI, has also been used to designate non-pribumi Indonesians.

In practice, the usage of the term is fluid. Pribumi is seldom used to refer to Indonesians of Melanesian descent, such as Moluccans and Papuans, although it does not exclude them. Indonesians of Arab descent sometimes refer to themselves as pribumi. Indonesians with some exogenous ancestry who show no obvious signs of identification with that ancestry (such as former president Abdurrahman Wahid who is said to have had Chinese ancestry) are seldom called non-pribumi.

The term putra daerah ("son of the region") refers to a person who is indigenous to a specific locality or region.

In 1998, the Indonesian government of President B. J. Habibie instructed that neither pribumi nor non-pribumi should be used within the government because they promoted ethnic discrimination.

The Dutch East India Company, which dominated parts of the archipelago from the 17th century, classified its subjects mainly by religion, rather than ethnicity. The colonial administration which took power in 1815 shifted to a system of ethnic classification. Initially, they distinguished between Europeans (Europeanen) and those equated with them (including native Christians) and Inlanders and those equated with them (including non-Christian Asians).

Over time, natives were gradually shifted de facto into the Inlander category, while Chinese Indonesians, Arab Indonesians, and others of non-Indonesian descent were gradually given separate status as Vreemde Oosterlingen ("Foreign Orientals"). The system was patriarchal, rather than formally racial. A child inherited his/her father's ethnicity if the parents were married; and the mother's ethnicity if they were unmarried. The offspring of a marriage between a European man and an Indonesian woman were legally European.

Today, the Indonesian dictionary defines pribumi as penghuni asli which translates into "original, native, or indigenous inhabitant".

== Background ==
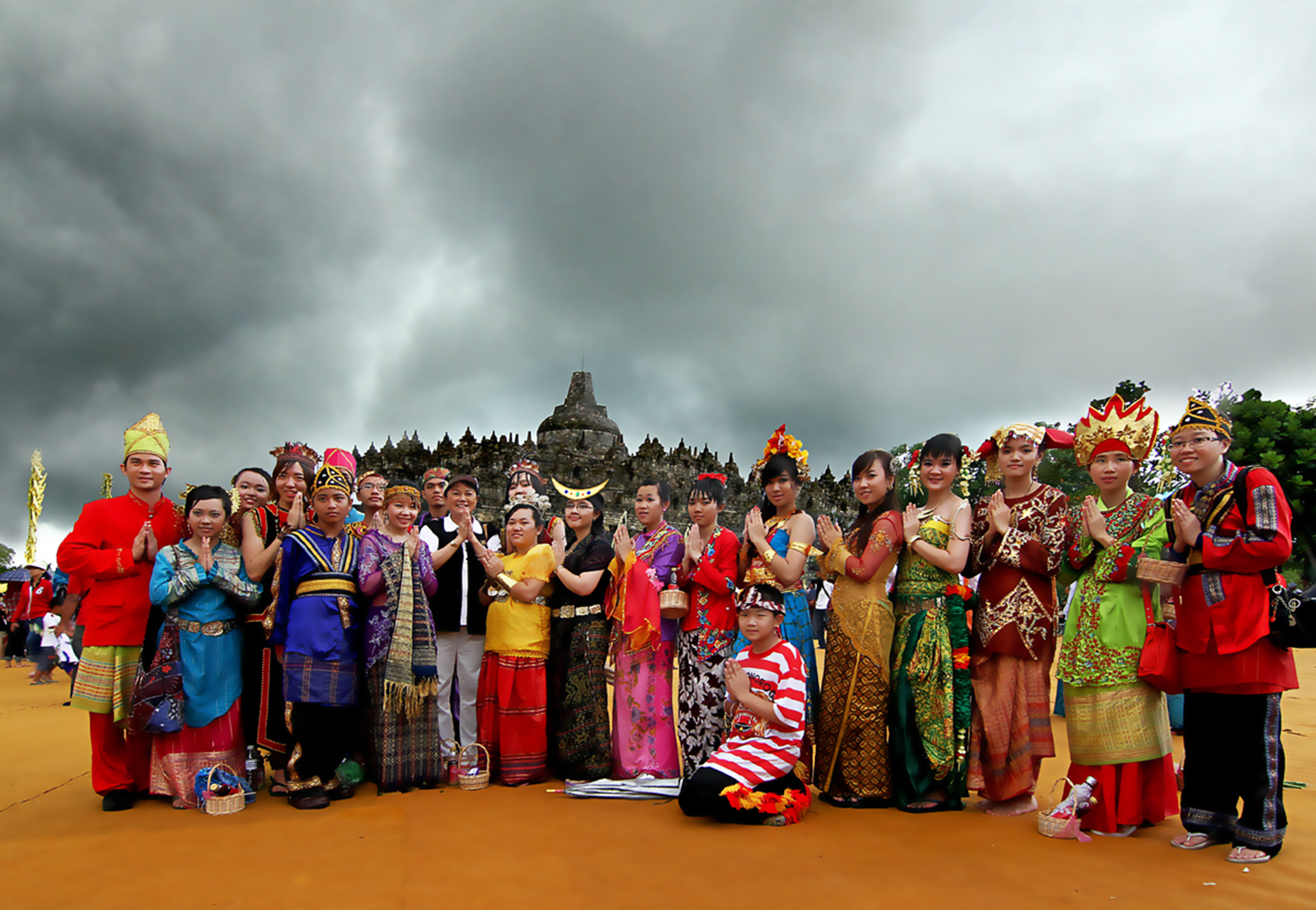
Indonesian children wearing traditional clothes from various regions in Indonesia

Pribumi make up about 95% of the Indonesian population. Using Indonesia's population estimate in 2006, this translates to about 230 million people. As an umbrella of similar cultural heritage among various ethnic groups in Indonesia, Pribumi culture plays a significant role in shaping the country's socioeconomic circumstances.

The United States Library of Congress Country Study of Indonesia defines Pribumi as follows:

Literally, an indigene, or native. In the colonial era, the great majority of the population of the archipelago came to regard themselves as indigenous, in contrast to the non-indigenous Dutch and Chinese (and, to a degree, Arab) communities. After independence the distinction persisted, expressed as a dichotomy between elements that were pribumi and those that were not. The distinction has had significant implications for economic development policy

There are over 600 ethnic groups in Indonesia.

The largest ethnic group in Indonesia is the Javanese people who make up 41% of the total population. The Javanese are concentrated on the island of Java but millions have migrated to other islands throughout the archipelago. The Sundanese, Malay, Batak, and Madurese are the next largest groups in the country. Many ethnic groups, particularly in Kalimantan and the province of Papua, have only hundreds of members. Most of the local languages belong to the Austronesian language family, although a significant number, particularly in North Maluku, Timor, Alor, and West Papua, speak Papuan languages.

The division and classification of ethnic groups in Indonesia are not rigid and in some cases are unclear as the result of migrations, along with cultural and linguistic influences; for example, some may agree that the Bantenese and Cirebonese belong to different ethnic groups with their distinct dialect, however others might consider them to be Javanese sub-ethnicities, as members of the larger Javanese people. The same considerations may apply to the Baduy people who share so many similarities with the Sundanese people that they can be considered as belonging to the same ethnic group. The clearest example of hybrid ethnicity is the Betawi people, the result of a mixture of different native ethnicities that have merged with people of Arab, Chinese, and Indian origins since the era of colonial Batavia (Jakarta), as well as the population of Larantuka known as Topasses who were of mixed descent from the Malaccan Malays, the Lamaholot, and Portuguese.

Several major ethnolinguistic groups of Indonesia

The proportional populations of Native Indonesians according to the 2010 census is as follows:

Ethnic groups	Population (million)	Percentage	Main regions
Javanese	95.217	40.2	Central Java, Yogyakarta, East Java, Lampung, Jakarta
Sundanese	31.765	15.4	West Java, Banten, Jakarta
Malay	8.789	4.1	Sumatra eastern coast, West Kalimantan
Batak	8.467	3.58	North Sumatra
Madurese	7 .179	3.03	Madura island, East Java
Bugis	6.000	2.9	South Sulawesi, East Kalimantan
Minangkabau	5.569	2.7	West Sumatra, Riau
Betawi	5.157	2.5	Jakarta, Banten, West Java
Banjarese	4.800	2.3	South Kalimantan, East Kalimantan
Bantenese	4.331	2.1	Banten, West Java
Acehnese	4.000	1.9	Aceh
Balinese	3.094	1.5	Bali
Dayak	3.009	1.5	North Kalimantan, West Kalimantan, Central Kalimantan
Sasak	3.000	1.4	West Nusa Tenggara
Makassarese	2.063	1.0	South Sulawesi
Cirebonese	1.856	0.9	West Java, Central Java

== Smaller groups ==
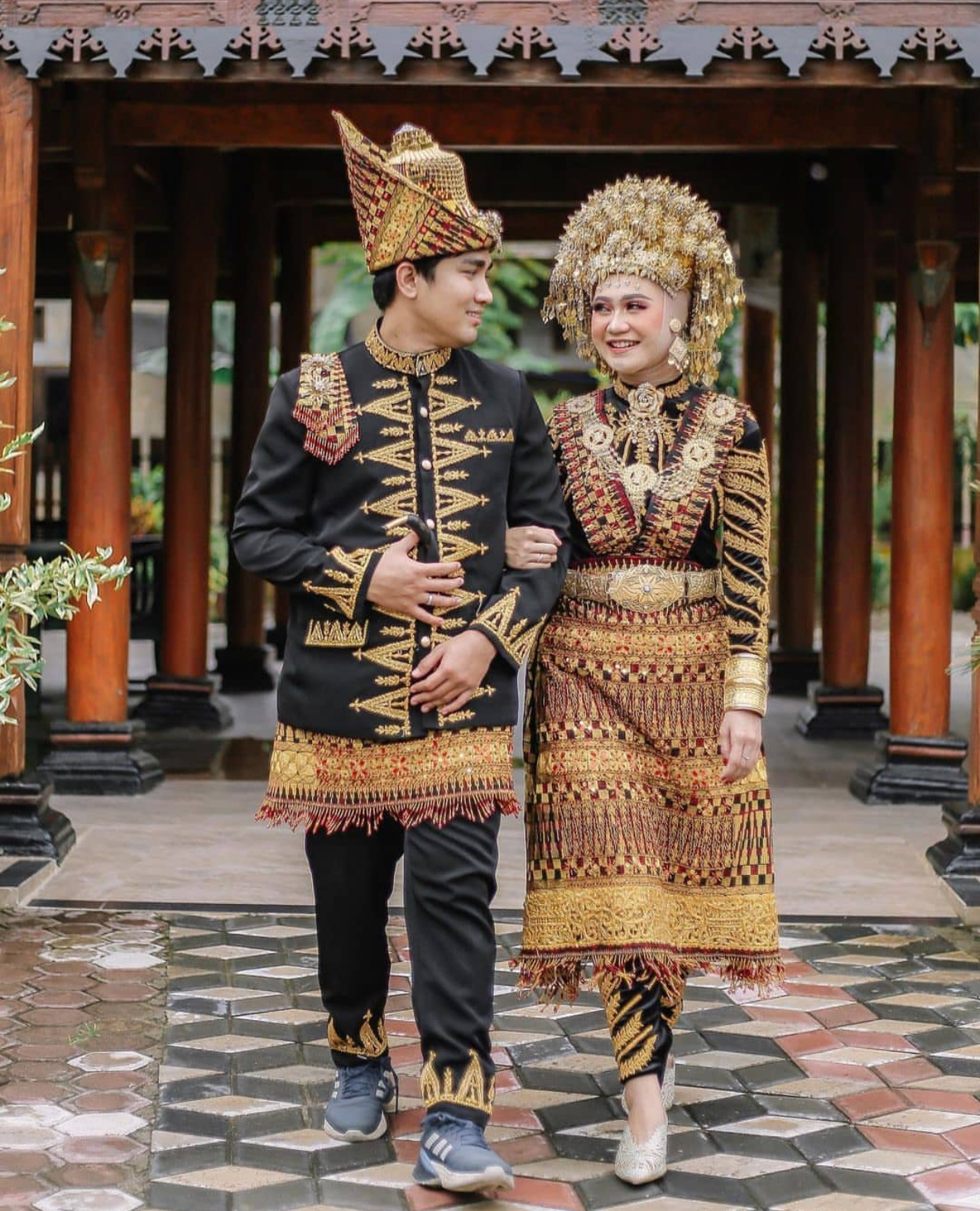
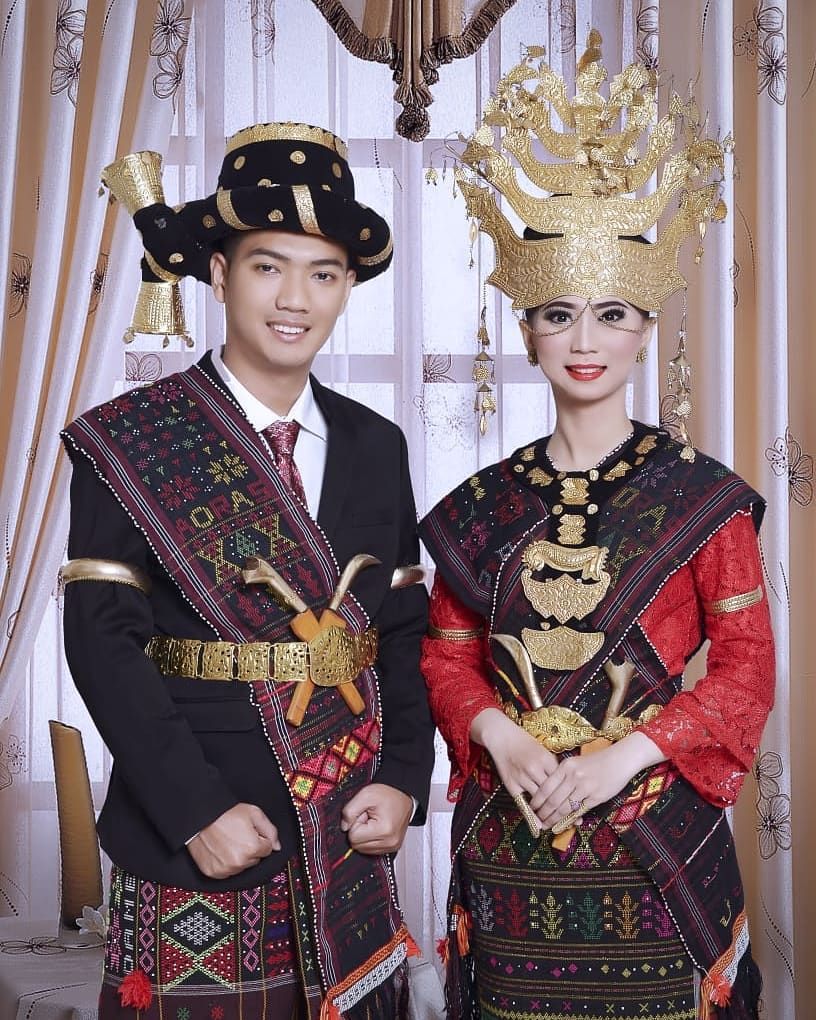
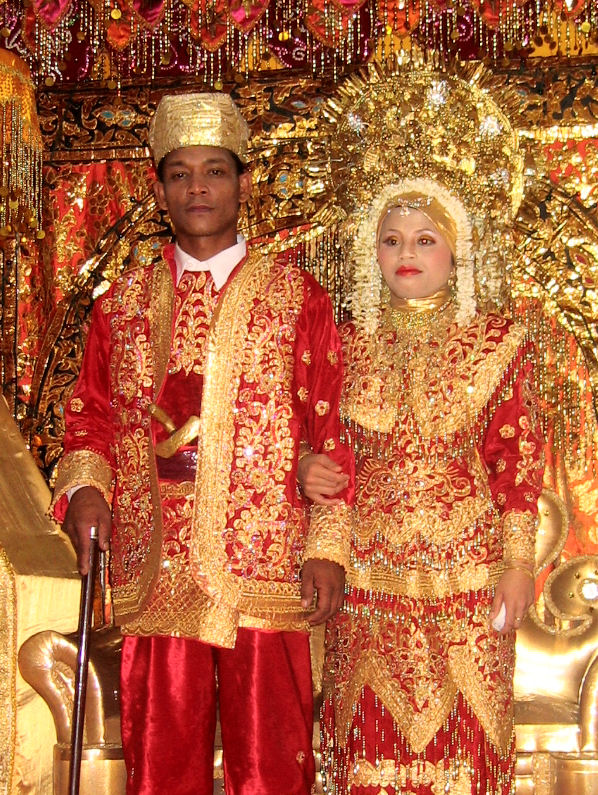
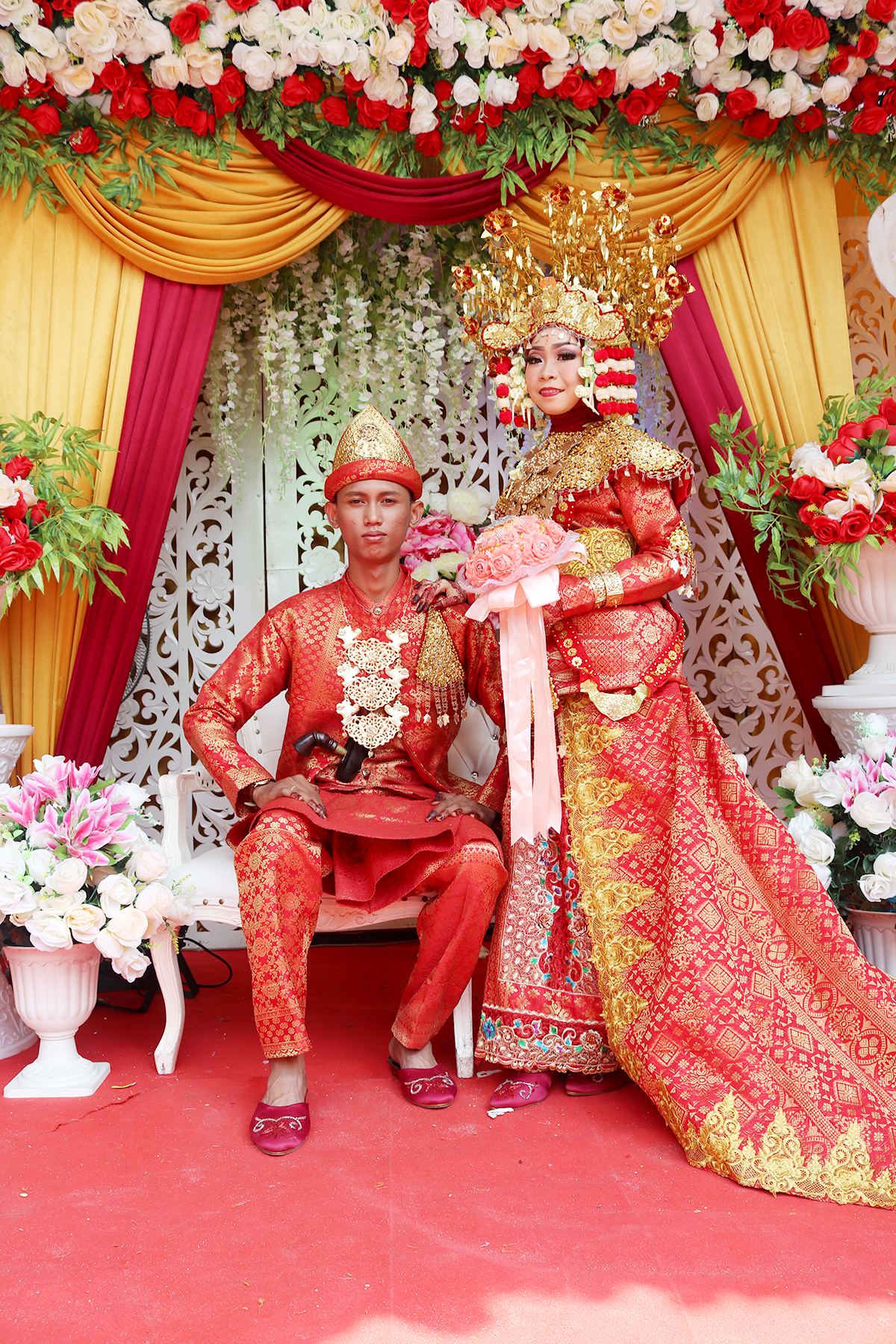
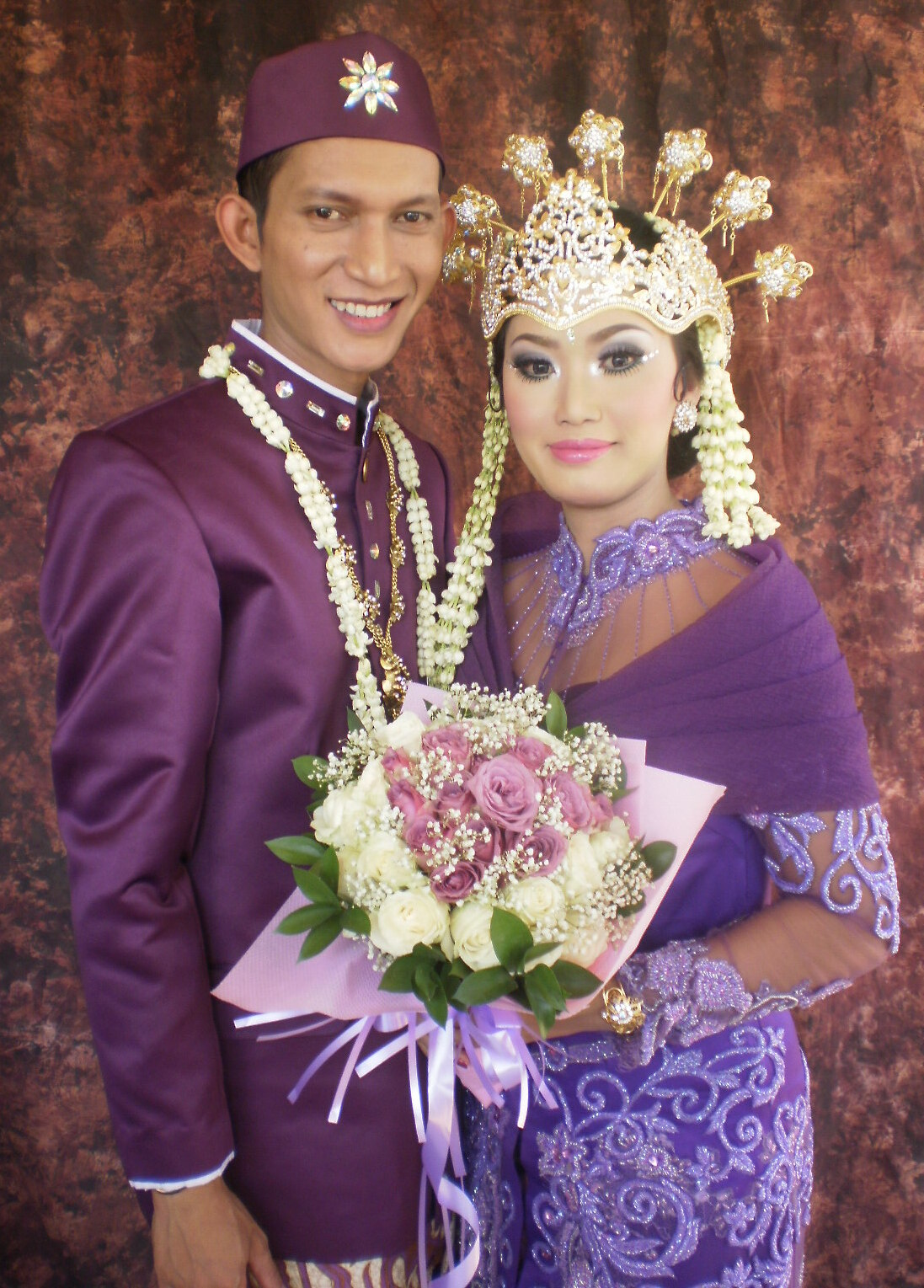
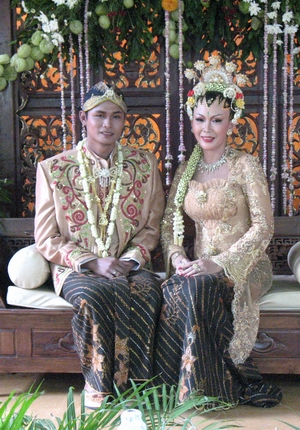
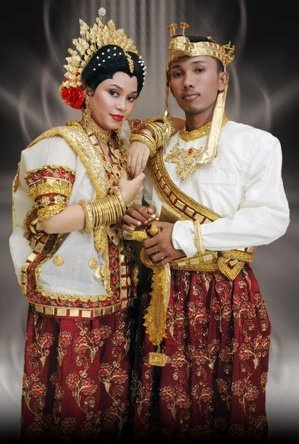
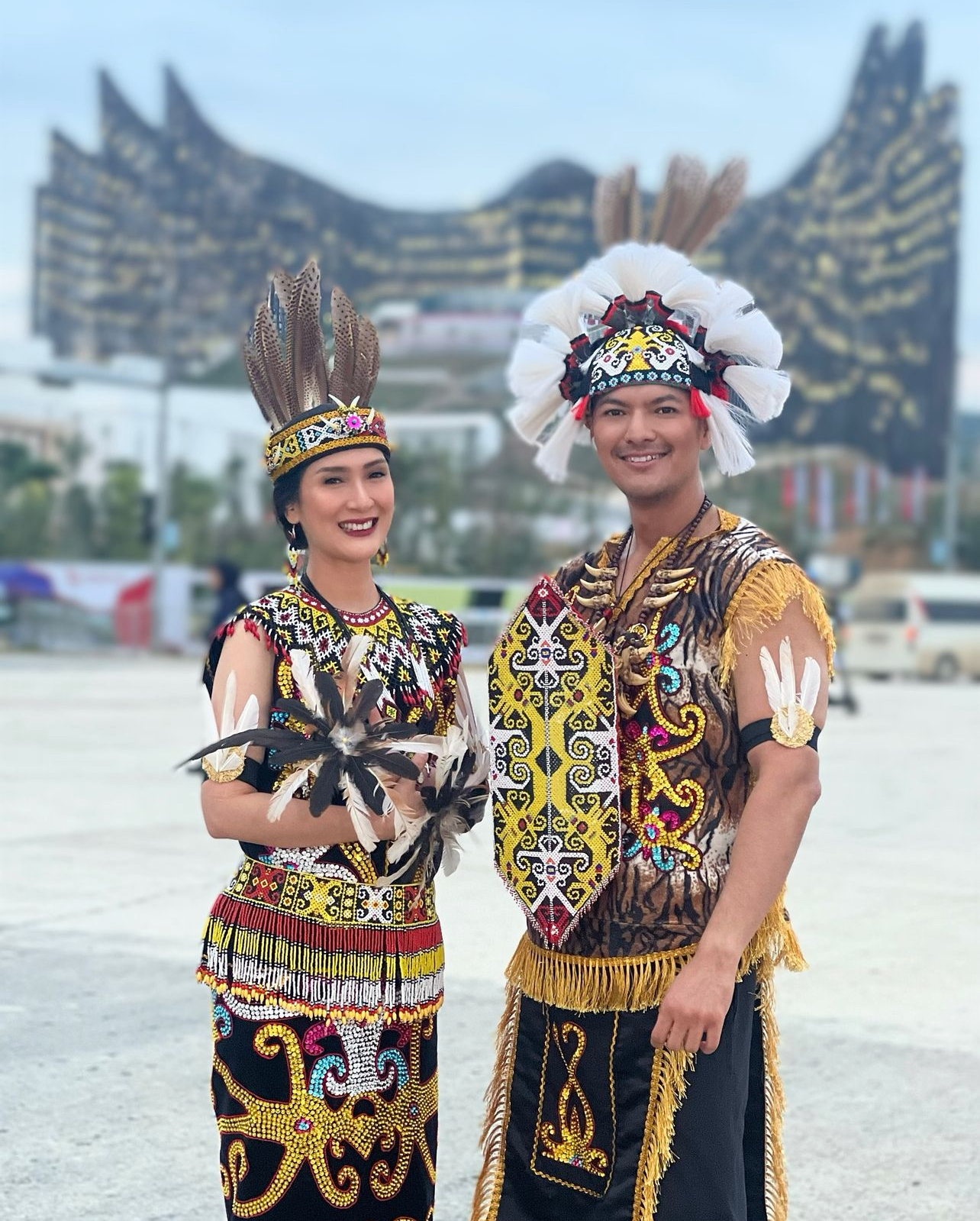
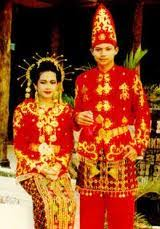
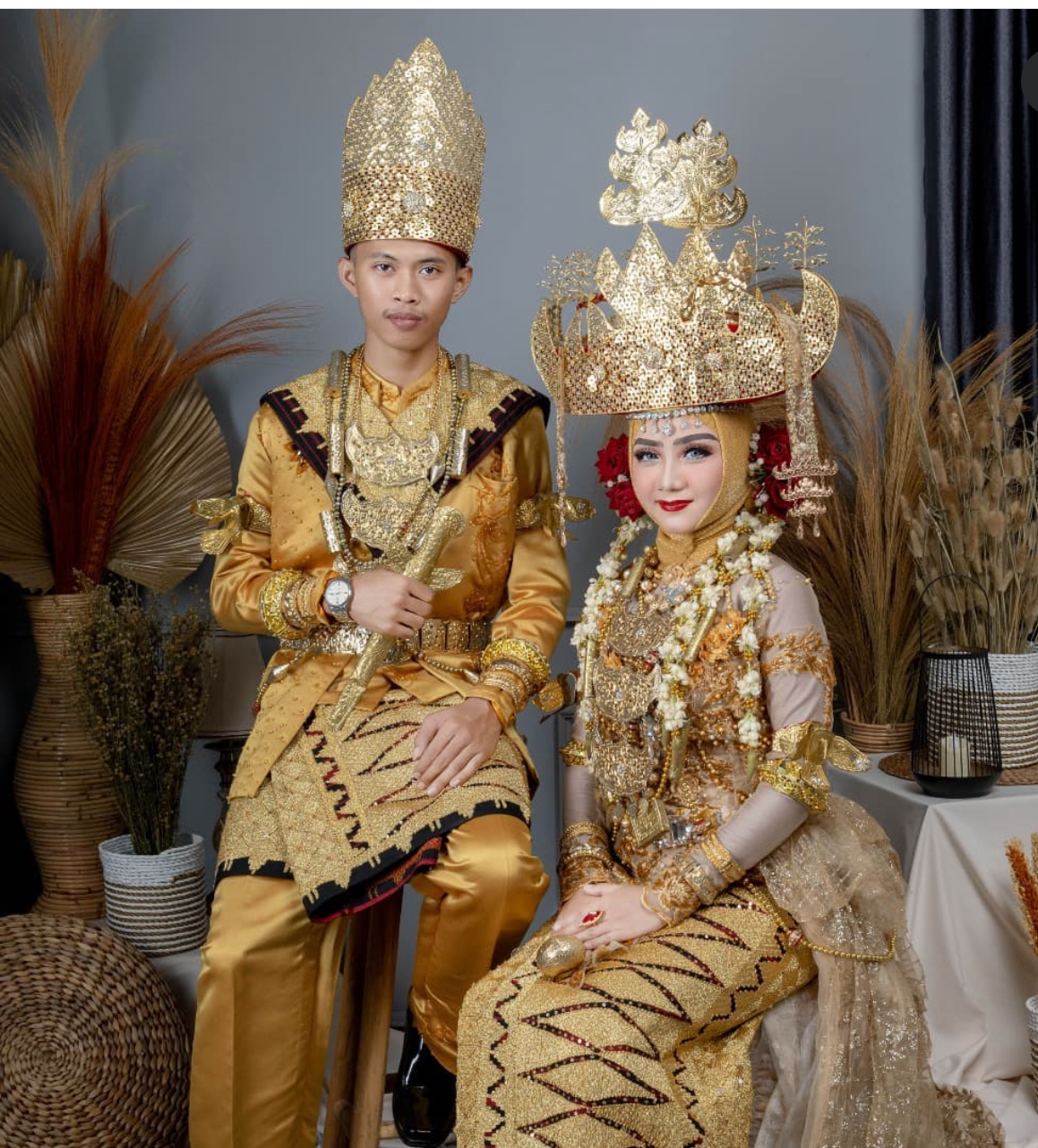
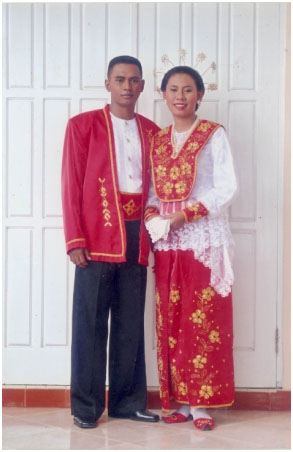
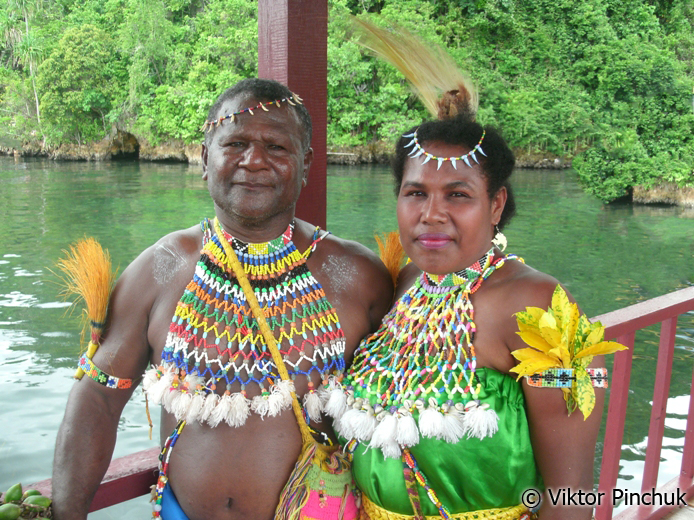
Ethnic groups in Indonesia. From left to right: Acehnese, Batak, Minangkabau, Palembangese, Sundanese, Javanese, Buginese, Dayaknese, Tolaki, Lampungese, Ambonese, and Kayu Pulau

The regions of Indonesia have some of their indigenous ethnic groups. Due to migration within Indonesia (as part of government transmigration programs or otherwise), there are significant populations of ethnic groups who reside outside of their traditional regions.

- Java: Javanese (Tenggerese, Osing, Banyumasan, etc.), Sundanese (Badui), Bantenese, Cirebonese, Betawi, Madurese (Bawean)
- Madura: Madurese (Kangean)
- Sumatra: Acehnese, Gayonese, Alas, Batak, Malay, Minangkabau, Rejang, Palembang, Lampung, Nias, Mentawai, Enggano, Kubu, Musi, Ogan, Komering, Rawas, Bangka, Belitung, and others
- Kalimantan: Dayak, Banjarese, Malays, Kutai, Pasir, and others
- Sulawesi: Makassarese, Buginese, Mandarese, Minahasan, Torajan, Gorontaloan, Bajau, Buton, Tolaki, Kaili, Pamona, Banggai, Saluan, Buol, Tomini, Mongondow, Sangihe, and others
- Lesser Sunda Islands: Balinese, Sasak, Sumbawa, Bimanese, Manggarai, Ngada, Li'o, Lamaholot, Dawan, Tetun, Helong, Roti, Savu, Sikka, Sumba, Alor, Bali Aga, and others
- Moluccas: Ambonese, Alune, Buru, Kei, Manusela, Tanimbar, Saparua, Wemale, Aru, Kisar, Babar, Tobelo, Galela, Ternate, Tidore, Makian, Sula, and others
- Papua: Asmat, Amungme, Bauzi, Dani, Sawi, Yaur, Biak, Sentani, Mimika, Yali, Arfak, Dauwa, Mek, Moni, Yapen, Ngalum, Waropen, Maybrat, Mbaham-Matta, Moi, and others (see List of ethnic groups of West Papua, Southwest Papua)

== See also ==
- Culture of Indonesia
- Ethnic groups in Indonesia
- List of ethnic groups in Indonesia by population
- List of indigenous peoples
- List of Indonesian people
- National costume of Indonesia
- Overseas Indonesians

=== Non-Pribumi Indonesians ===
- African Indonesians
- Arab Indonesians
- Chinese Indonesians
- Dutch Indonesians
- Filipino Indonesians
- Indian Indonesians
- Jewish Indonesians
- Pakistani Indonesians
- Japanese Indonesians
