= List of ethnic groups in Indonesia by population =

More than 600 ethnic groups reside in Indonesia. Data on ethnic identities were collected nationally in national censuses, such as in the 2000 census and the 2010 census held by Statistics Indonesia. The following lists rank ethnic groups in Indonesia by population figures.

== 2010 census ==
=== Initial classification ===
This list was compiled from the raw data of the 2010 census by Statistics Indonesia (Badan Pusat Statistik, BPS) based on a preliminary classification, which is not meant to be exhaustive and combined figures for smaller groups in various regions.

| Rank | Ethnic group | Population | Percentage |
|---|---|---|---|
| 1 | Javanese | 95,217,022 | 40.22 |
| 2 | Sundanese | 36,701,670 | 15.5 |
| 3 | Batak | 8,466,969 | 3.58 |
| 4 | Other ethnic groups from Sulawesi | 7,634,262 | 3.22 |
| 5 | Madurese | 7,179,356 | 3.03 |
| 6 | Betawi | 6,807,968 | 2.88 |
| 7 | Minangkabau | 6,462,713 | 2.73 |
| 8 | Bugis | 6,359,700 | 2.69 |
| 9 | Malay | 5,365,399 | 2.27 |
| 10 | Ethnic groups from South Sumatra | 5,119,581 | 2.16 |
| 11 | Bantenese | 4,657,784 | 1.97 |
| 12 | Ethnic groups from East Nusa Tenggara | 4,184,923 | 1.77 |
| 13 | Banjarese | 4,127,124 | 1.74 |
| 14 | Ethnic groups from Aceh | 4,091,451 | 1.73 |
| 15 | Balinese | 3,946,416 | 1.67 |
| 16 | Sasak | 3,173,127 | 1.34 |
| 17 | Dayak | 3,009,494 | 1.27 |
| 18 | Chinese | 2,832,510 | 1.2 |
| 19 | Ethnic groups from Papua | 2,693,630 | 1.14 |
| 20 | Makassarese | 2,672,590 | 1.13 |
| 21 | Other ethnic groups from Sumatra | 2,204,472 | 0.93 |
| 22 | Moluccan | 2,203,415 | 0.93 |
| 23 | Other ethnic groups from Kalimantan | 1,968,620 | 0.83 |
| 24 | Cirebonese | 1,877,514 | 0,79 |
| 25 | Ethnic groups from Jambi | 1,415,547 | 0.6 |
| 26 | Ethnic groups from Lampung | 1,381,660 | 0.58 |
| 27 | Other ethnic groups from West Nusa Tenggara | 1,280,094 | 0.54 |
| 28 | Gorontalo | 1,251,494 | 0.53 |
| 29 | Minahasa | 1,237,177 | 0.52 |
| 30 | Nias | 1,041,925 | 0.44 |
| 31 | Foreigners | 162,772 | 0.07 |
| | Total | 236,728,379 | 100 |

=== New classification ===
This list was compiled from the same raw data of the 2010 census, according to the "new classification" developed by Institute of Southeast Asian Studies (ISEAS) in collaboration with Statistics Indonesia. The new classification categorized 1,331 coded ethnicities from the census into more than 600 groups instead of just 31 in the initial classification, completely dissolved the placeholder "ethnic groups from X" categories to better capture the diversity of Indonesia's ethnic demography, corrected misplaced groups and subgroups, and attempted to aggregate and separate sub-ethnic groups into ethnic groups by relying on anthropological sources.

A list of the largest 145 ethnic groups based on the new classification are shown in the table below:

| Rank | Ethnic group | Population | Percentage |
|---|---|---|---|
| 1 | Javanese | 94,843,073 | 40.06 |
| 2 | Sundanese | 36,704,944 | 15.51 |
| 3 | Malay | 8,753,791 | 3.70 |
| 4 | Batak | 8,466,969 | 3.58 |
| 5 | Madurese | 7,179,356 | 3.03 |
| 6 | Betawi | 6,807,968 | 2.88 |
| 7 | Minangkabau | 6,462,713 | 2.73 |
| 8 | Bugis | 6,415,103 | 2.71 |
| 9 | Bantenese | 4,642,389 | 1.96 |
| 10 | Banjarese | 4,127,124 | 1.74 |
| 11 | Balinese | 3,924,908 | 1.66 |
| 12 | Acehnese | 3,404,109 | 1.44 |
| 13 | Dayak | 3,219,626 | 1.36 |
| 14 | Sasak | 3,175,006 | 1.34 |
| 15 | Chinese | 2,832,510 | 1.2 |
| 16 | Makassarese | 2,672,590 | 1.13 |
| 17 | Cirebonese | 1,877,514 | 0.79 |
| 18 | Lampung | 1,376,390 | 0.58 |
| 19 | Palembang | 1,252,258 | 0.53 |
| 20 | Gorontalo | 1,251,884 | 0.53 |
| 21 | Minahasa | 1,240,232 | 0.52 |
| 22 | Nias | 1,041,925 | 0.44 |
| 23 | Buton | 937,761 | 0.40 |
| 24 | Atoni | 933,093 | 0.39 |
| 25 | Toraja | 857,250 | 0.36 |
| 26 | Kaili | 770,088 | 0.33 |
| 27 | Manggarai | 737,615 | 0.31 |
| 28 | Ogan | 721,613 | 0.30 |
| 29 | Mandar | 684,688 | 0.29 |
| 30 | Bangka | 683,193 | 0.29 |
| 31 | Bima | 665,383 | 0.28 |
| 32 | Sumba | 658,721 | 0.28 |
| 33 | Musi | 654,105 | 0.28 |
| 34 | Dani | 650,898 | 0.27 |
| 35 | Sangir | 553,853 | 0.23 |
| 36 | Rejang | 454,673 | 0.19 |
| 37 | Ambon | 442,585 | 0.19 |
| 38 | Tolaki | 425,938 | 0.18 |
| 39 | Luwu | 420,117 | 0.18 |
| 40 | Sumbawa | 396,906 | 0.17 |
| 41 | Komering | 370,119 | 0.16 |
| 42 | Gayo | 336,856 | 0.14 |
| 43 | Muna | 332,437 | 0.14 |
| 44 | Auwye/Mee | 316,357 | 0.13 |
| 45 | Mongondow | 304,292 | 0.13 |
| 46 | Kerinci | 303,550 | 0.13 |
| 47 | Lamaholot | 294,615 | 0.12 |
| 48 | Ngada | 289,950 | 0.12 |
| 49 | Osing | 286,653 | 0.12 |
| 50 | Kutai | 279,055 | 0.12 |
| 51 | Timor Leste origin | 269,368 | 0.11 |
| 52 | Flores | 260,069 | 0.11 |
| 53 | Bajau | 241,836 | 0.10 |
| 54 | Rote | 239,346 | 0.10 |
| 55 | Duri | 238,084 | 0.10 |
| 56 | Kei | 213,826 | 0.09 |
| 57 | Biak-Numfor | 204,415 | 0.09 |
| 58 | Belitung | 201,068 | 0.08 |
| 59 | Alor | 196,529 | 0.08 |
| 60 | Seram | 194,818 | 0.08 |
| 61 | Rawas | 192,705 | 0.08 |
| 62 | Lio | 187,155 | 0.08 |
| 63 | Pamona | 186,163 | 0.08 |
| 64 | Savu | 177,297 | 0.07 |
| 65 | Banggai | 165,381 | 0.07 |
| 66 | Enim | 163,628 | 0.07 |
| 67 | Lembak | 163,262 | 0.07 |
| 68 | Rambang | 144,986 | 0.06 |
| 69 | Ngalik/Yali | 133,812 | 0.06 |
| 70 | Mamasa | 133,659 | 0.06 |
| 71 | Ternate | 133,110 | 0.06 |
| 72 | Asmat | 132,991 | 0.06 |
| 73 | Selayar | 131,213 | 0.06 |
| 74 | Mbojo | 127,972 | 0.05 |
| 75 | Daya | 121,289 | 0.05 |
| 76 | Buol | 119,713 | 0.05 |
| 77 | Arabs | 118,866 | 0.05 |
| 78 | Tobelo | 115,946 | 0.05 |
| 79 | Tanimbar | 110,597 | 0.05 |
| 80 | Mamuju | 108,229 | 0.05 |
| 81 | Galela | 102,456 | 0.04 |
| 82 | Yapen | 99,305 | 0.04 |
| 83 | Dauwa | 99,239 | 0.04 |
| 84 | Alas | 98,223 | 0.04 |
| 85 | Saluan | 97,134 | 0.04 |
| 86 | Talaud | 97,314 | 0.04 |
| 87 | Tomini | 93,879 | 0.04 |
| 88 | Makian | 90,960 | 0.04 |
| 89 | Saparua | 89,674 | 0.04 |
| 90 | Tidore | 87,524 | 0.04 |
| 91 | Sula | 84,858 | 0.04 |
| 92 | Bawean | 83,409 | 0.04 |
| 93 | Arfak | 73,828 | 0.03 |
| 94 | Pasir | 73,350 | 0.03 |
| 95 | Lauje | 72,371 | 0.03 |
| 96 | Mentawai | 69,145 | 0.03 |
| 97 | Simeulue | 67,722 | 0.03 |
| 98 | Aneuk Jamee | 63,357 | 0.03 |
| 99 | Moni | 63,309 | 0.03 |
| 100 | Dompu | 61,817 | 0.03 |
| 101 | Buru | 57,521 | 0.02 |
| 102 | Singkil | 52,982 | 0.02 |
| 103 | Tamiang | 52,901 | 0.02 |
| 104 | Ayfat | 52,654 | 0.02 |
| 105 | Mariri | 45,550 | 0.02 |
| 106 | Ta’a | 44,579 | 0.02 |
| 107 | Mukomuko | 43,750 | 0.02 |
| 108 | Ketengban | 42,025 | 0.02 |
| 109 | Tialo | 41,703 | 0.02 |
| 110 | Kaur | 40,863 | 0.02 |
| 111 | Moronene | 40,025 | 0.02 |
| 112 | Marind Anim | 37,558 | 0.02 |
| 113 | Pattae | 34,962 | 0.01 |
| 114 | Geser-Gorom | 33,598 | 0.01 |
| 115 | Haruku | 31,052 | 0.01 |
| 116 | Aru | 30,942 | 0.01 |
| 117 | Sentani | 30,661 | 0.01 |
| 118 | Ngalum | 29,186 | 0.01 |
| 119 | Pekal | 29,173 | 0.01 |
| 120 | Kamoro/Mimika | 28,645 | 0.01 |
| 121 | Loloda | 28,132 | 0.01 |
| 122 | Kisar | 27,963 | 0.01 |
| 123 | Akit | 27,769 | 0.01 |
| 124 | Babar | 27,450 | 0.01 |
| 125 | Hubla | 27,353 | 0.01 |
| 126 | Waropen | 27,073 | 0.01 |
| 127 | Baham | 24,521 | 0.01 |
| 128 | Bali Aga | 23,826 | 0.01 |
| 129 | Tobaru | 23,704 | 0.01 |
| 130 | Banda | 23,247 | 0.01 |
| 131 | Kau | 22,970 | 0.01 |
| 132 | Damal | 22,479 | 0.01 |
| 133 | Mooi | 21,923 | 0.01 |
| 134 | Yaghay | 21,121 | 0.01 |
| 135 | Patani | 19,387 | 0.01 |
| 136 | Galumpang | 18,350 | 0.01 |
| 137 | Wandamen | 16,562 | 0.01 |
| 138 | Tehit | 16,398 | 0.01 |
| 139 | Suwawa | 16,374 | 0.01 |
| 140 | Kore | 16,313 | 0.01 |
| 141 | Irarutu | 12,033 | 0.01 |
| 142 | Kokoda | 10,146 | 0.00 |
| 143 | Inanwatan | 9,685 | 0.00 |
| 144 | Wamesa | 9,548 | 0.00 |
| 145 | Atinggola | 6,090 | 0.00 |
| 146 | Others | 2,199,556 | 0.89 |
| | Total | 236,728,379 | 100 |
