= Kapitayan =

Belief of ancient people on Java island

Kapitayan Monotheistic Javanism
- ꦏꦥꦶꦠꦪꦤ꧀ Kapitayan
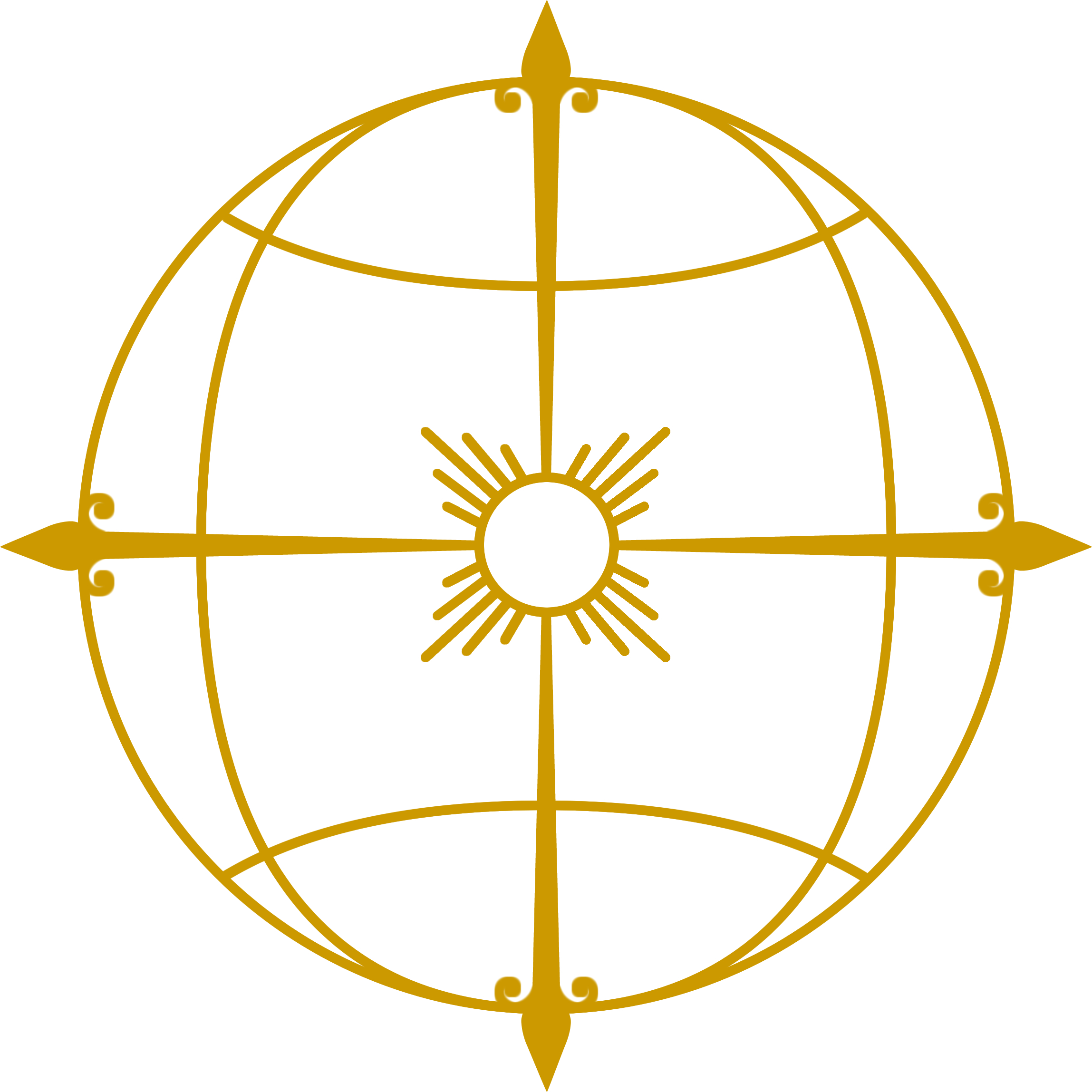
- Abbreviation: Taya
- Type: Folk religion
- Governance: Directorate General of Faith to the Almighty God, Ministry of Culture
- Region: Central and eastern regions of Java; Central Java; East Java; Special Region of Yogyakarta
- Language: Old Javanese (mainly used in rituals); Javanese (mainly Bagongan Javanese)
- Headquarters: Central Java
- Recognition: Officially recognized by Indonesian government
- Members: Javanese

Kapitayan (from Javanese: ꦏꦥꦶꦠꦪꦤ꧀) is a Javanese monotheistic folk religion native to Java since the Paleolithic. Locally, it is referred to as "the monotheist ancient Javanese religion", "ancestral monotheist religion", or "Tiyang Jawi (Javanese) religion" to differentiate it from Kejawèn (a polytheistic Javanism).

== Etymology ==
The term Kapitayan is Old Javanese in origin, constructed from the base word Taya (Old Javanese script:, lit. 'unimaginable', 'unseen', or 'absolute'). Thus, it means that Taya cannot be thought or imagined, or cannot be approached by the five senses.

== Belief ==
=== Deity ===
Kapitayan is teaching that worships a main deity or god called Sanghyang Taya (ꦱꦁꦲꦾꦁꦠꦪ, meaning 'unimaginable entity'; also called Suwung (ꦱꦸꦮꦸꦁ), Awang (ꦲꦮꦁ), or Uwung (ꦲꦸꦮꦸꦁ)). Sanghyang Taya is defined as tan keno kinaya ngapa (ꦠꦤ꧀ꦏꦺꦤꦏꦶꦤꦪꦔꦥ), meaning "cannot be seen, thought about, or imagined". As an abstraction that cannot be described, His existence is unreachable by worldly capacity.

The term Awang-uwung (ꦲꦮꦁꦲꦸꦮꦸꦁ) refers to the real but unreachable, which can be known and worshiped by worldly beings including humans. To be worshiped, Sanghyang Taya has a personal name and attribute called Tu (ꦠꦸ) or To (ꦠꦺꦴ), meaning "magical power" and which is supernatural. Tu or To are singular—a single entity.

Tu is commonly referred to by the name Sanghyang Tunggal (ꦱꦁꦲꦾꦁꦠꦸꦁꦒꦭ꧀) and has two qualities: Goodness and Wickedness. Tu who is good is generally known as the Tuhan (ꦠꦸꦲꦤ꧀) and called Sanghyang Wenang (ꦱꦁꦲꦾꦁꦮꦺꦤꦁ). Tu who is wicked is called Sanghyang Manikmaya (ꦱꦁꦲꦾꦁꦩꦤꦶꦏ꧀ꦩꦪ). Thus, Sanghyang Wenang and Sanghyang Manikmaya are essentially just the nature of Sanghyang Tunggal. All these aspects are supernatural and cannot be approached with the five senses and the mind; only His character is known.

Sanghyang Taya's power is represented in various places, such as on rocks, monuments, and trees. Offerings are made in these places, not to worship rocks, monuments, or trees, but to reflect devotion to Sanghyang Taya, whose power is represented in those places.

The Kapitayan religion does not recognize gods as in Hinduism.

=== Theology ===
Archaeological remains and relics (including dolmens, menhirs, sarcophagi, punden berundak, nekara, and others) indicate the existence of ancient religions on Java.

During the colonial period, Dutch historians mistakenly identified Kapitayan as animism and dynamism because, in physical appearance, the rituals performed by its adherents appear to be worshipping objects. That is, the worship of objects was understood as worship of the power of the object itself (animism-dynamism). (Note: However, one who worships in this manner, according to Ma Huan, is called an 'unbeliever' or 'infidel'.) In fact, initially the Kapitayan teachings did not worship the object as absolute power but rather worshiped Sang Hyang, the highest power. In this way, Kapitayan is more like monotheism than animism-dynamism. Objects involved in religious rituals—such as trees, stones, and springs—are just a few manifestations of the supreme power of Sang Hyang.

Because the Sanghyang Tunggal is supernatural, to worship Him requires a means that can be approached by the five senses and the human mind. In the Kapitayan teachings, there is a belief that states that the supernatural power of the Sanghyang Taya called Tu or To is "hidden" in everything that has the name 'Tu' or 'To'. Followers believe in the existence of supernatural powers in wa-tu, tu-gu, tu-tuk, tu-nda, tu-lang, tu-nggul, tu-ak, tu-k, tu-ban, tu-mbak, tunggak, tu-lup, tu-ngkub, tu-rumbukan, un-tu, pin-tu, tu-tud, to-peng, to-san, to-pong, to-parem, to-wok, to-ya. In worshiping Sanghyang Taya through these means, people provide offerings in the form of tumpeng, tu-mbal, tu-mbu, tu-kung, tu-d, or through something that is believed to have supernatural powers.

A worshiper of Sanghyang Taya who is considered pious will be blessed with positive supernatural powers (tu-ah) and negative (tu-lah). A ra-tu or dha-tu is the embodiment of Sanghyang Taya's supernatural powers. Those who have been gifted with the tu-ah and tu-lah are considered entitled to become community leaders, called ra-tu or dha-tu ("ruler"). For those who have been gifted with tu-ah and tu-lah, their life movements will be marked by Pi: the hidden power of Sanghyang Taya's divine secret.

=== Practices ===
In worship of Sanghyang Tunggal, Kapitayan followers provide offerings such as tu-mpeng, tu-mpi (cake made of flour), tumbu (square basket made of woven bamboo for flower holders), tu-ak (wine), or tu-kung (a kind of chicken) in sacred places. Sanghyang Tunggal's magical power is hidden in everything that is believed to have supernatural powers, such as tu-ngkub, tu-nda, wa-tu, tu-gu, tu-nggak, tu-k, tu-ban, tu-rumbukan, and tu-tuk. Kapitayan followers who have the intention of doing tu-ju (divination) or other urgent needs will worship Sanghyang Tunggal with a special offering called tu-mbal.

In contrast, the worship of Sanghyang Taya directly is commonly carried out by the Kapitayan clergy and takes place in a sanggar, which is a rectangular building with an overlapping roof. A hole in the wall known as Tu tu-k (alcove hole) is a symbol of the emptiness of Sanghyang Taya.

In praying to Sanghyang Taya in the sanggar, the Kapitayan clergy follow certain rules. At first, the worshiping clergyman performs tu-lajeg (standing still) facing the tutu-k (alcove hole) with both hands raised to present Sanghyang Taya in tutu-d (heart). After feeling Sanghyang Taya residing in the heart, both hands were lowered and clasped to the chest right to the heart. This position is called swa-dikep (holding one's self). The tu-lajeg process is carried out in a relatively long time, after which the prayer is continued with the tu-ngkul position (bent down looking down), which is also carried out for a relatively long time. This is followed by the tu-lumpak position (kneeling with both heels occupied). Finally, the to-ndhem position (prostrate like a baby in its mother's womb) is performed. While performing these rituals for more than an hour, the Kapitayan spiritualists try to maintain the continuity of the existence of Sanghyang Taya which had been buried in tutu-d (heart).

== Kapitayan and Islam ==
Kapitayan's religious values were adopted by the Walisongo ('Nine Saints') in spreading Islam in Java. The concept of tawhid in Kapitayan (Tan keno kinaya ngapa; "can't be seen, can't be thought, can't be imagined, He is beyond everything") is similar to the concept of tawhid in Islam (ليس كمثله شىء; "There is nothing like unto Him"; Qur'an Surah Ash-Syura chapter 42 verse 11). Walisongo also used the term sembahyang (worshipping Sanghyang Taya) in introducing the Islamic term shalat (daily prayers).

In terms of places for worship or praying in Kapitayan, the term sanggar represents a four-square building with an empty hole on its wall as the symbol of Sang Hyang Taya, rather than arca or statues as in Hinduism or Buddhism. This term was used by the Walisongo (as langgar) to represent the term of masjid (mosque) in Islam.

In Kapitayan, Upawasa (Puasa or Poso) (Note: Incidentally, the ritual of fasting in Hinduism is also called Upawasa or Upavasa.) is a ritual of not eating from morning until night; Walisongo used the term to represent siyam (fasting) in Islam. The term Poso Dino Pitu in Kapitayan, meaning "fasting on the day of the second and the fifth day", is very similar to the Islam form of fasting on Mondays and Thursdays. The tradition of tumpengan of Kapitayan was also kept by the Walisongo under the Islamic perspective of sadaqah (charity). This is the meaning of the terminology that Gus Dur (Indonesian fourth president) mentioned as "mempribumikan Islam" (Indigenize Islam).

== Sources ==
- Sunyoto, Agus (2017), Atlas Walisongo: Buku Pertama yang Mengungkap Walisongo Sebagai Fakta Sejarah, Tangerang Selatan: Pustaka Iman
