= Kejawèn =

Folk religion of Javanese people

Kejawèn Polytheistic Javanism
- ꦏꦗꦮꦺꦤ꧀ Kajawèn
- Type: Folk religion
- Governance: National Javanism Religious Council of the Republic Indonesia
- Region: Central and eastern regions of Java; Central Java; East Java; Special Region of Yogyakarta
- Language: Old Javanese (mainly used in rituals); Javanese (mainly Bagongan Javanese)
- Headquarters: Central Java
- Recognition: Officially recognized by the Indonesian government
- Separated from: Kapitayan (monotheistic Javanism)
- Members: Javanese

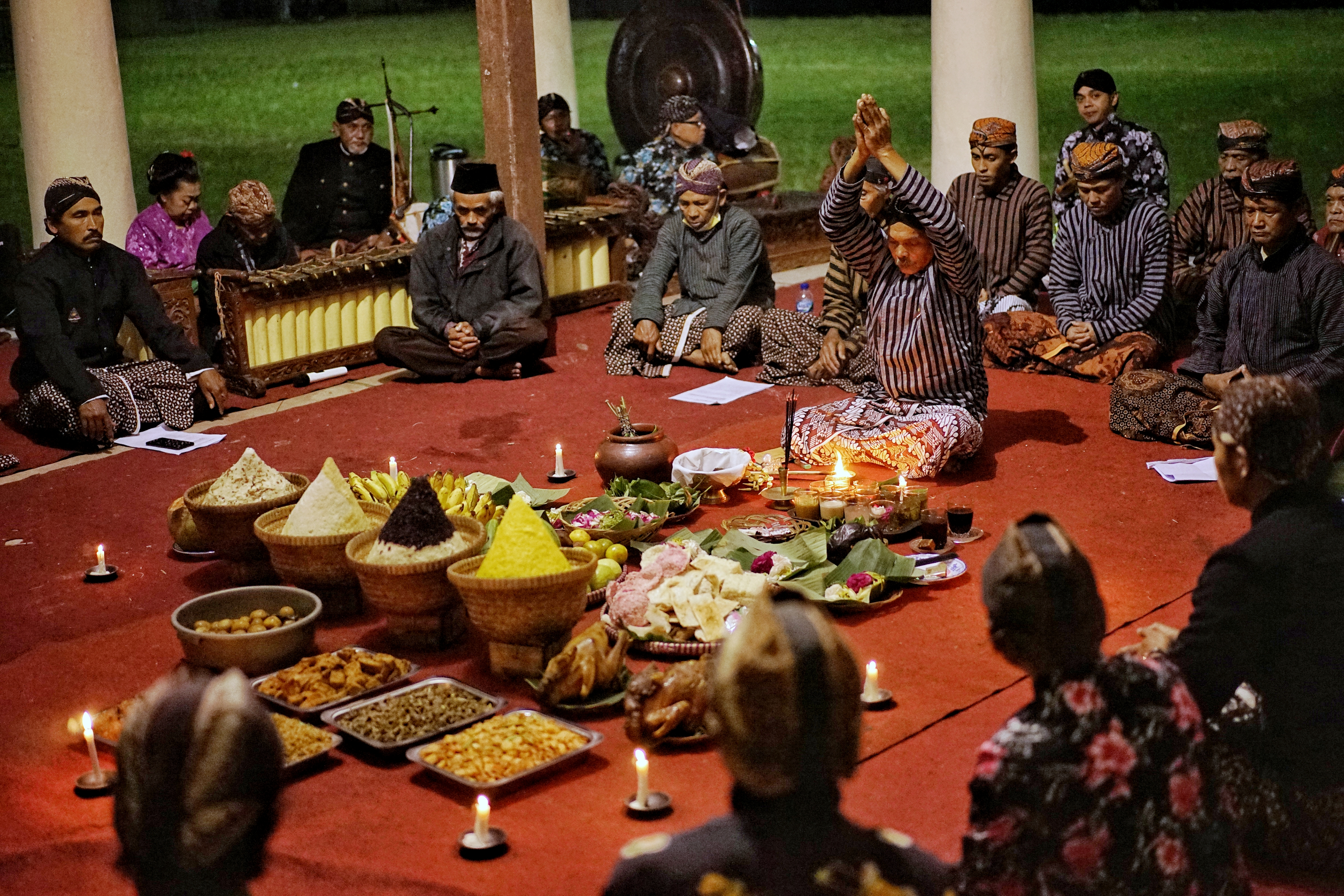
Javanese Kejawen community performing Birat Sengkolo ritual with offerings including several tumpeng

Kejawèn (Javanese: ꦏꦗꦮꦺꦤ꧀, romanized: Kajawèn) or Javanism, also known as Kebatinan, (Indonesian: Agama Jawa, lit. 'Javanese Religion', and Kepercayaan (lit. 'Belief'), is a Javanese cultural tradition, consisting of an amalgam of animistic, Buddhist, Hindu and Islamic aspects. It is rooted in Javanese history and religiosity, syncretizing aspects of different religions and traditions.

== Definitions ==
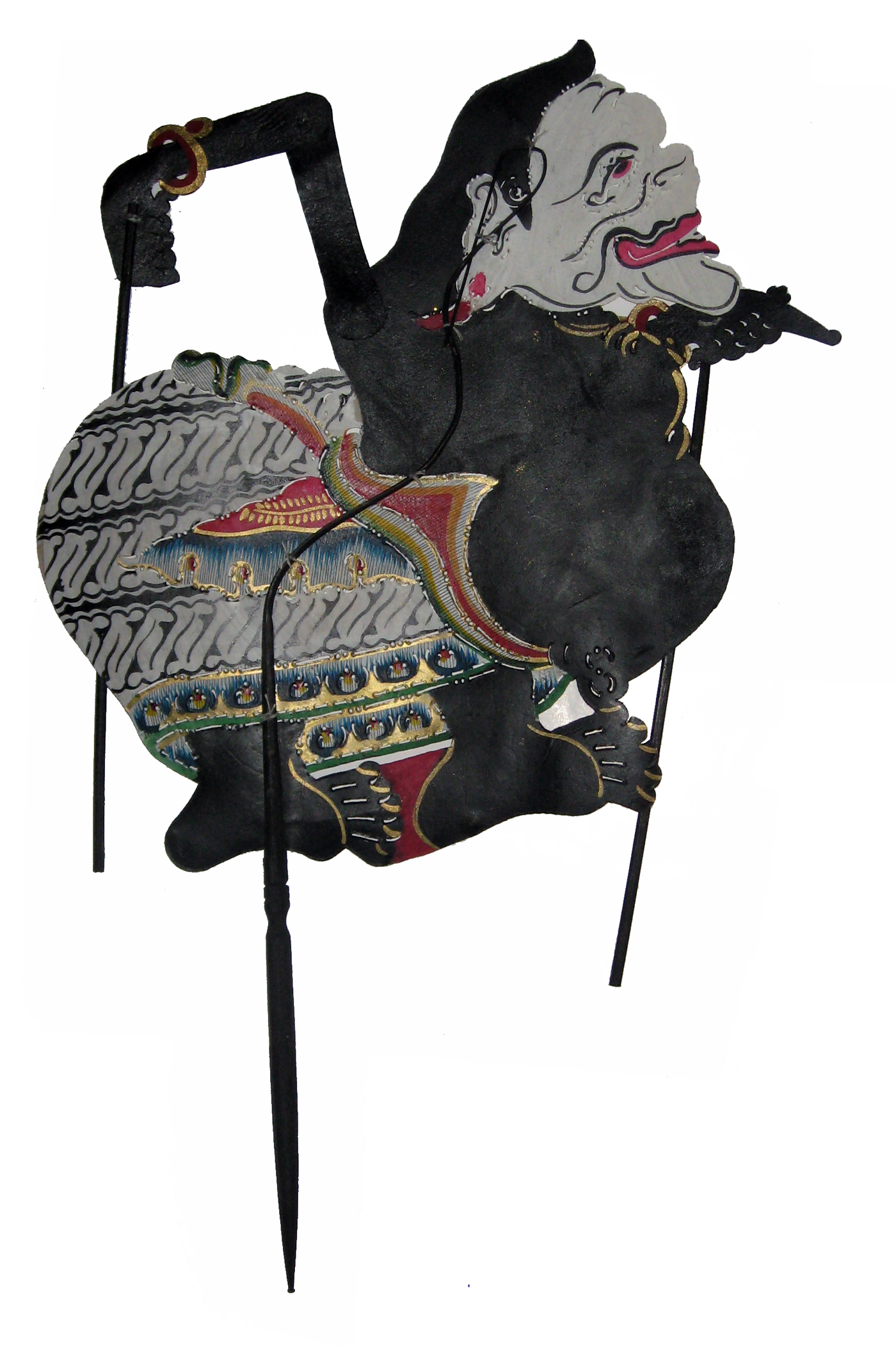
A Wayang puppet representing Semar

The term kebatinan is used interchangeably with kejawèn, Agama Jawa and Kepercayaan, although they are not exactly the same:

- Kebatinan: "the science of the inner", "inwardness", derived from the Arabic word batin, meaning "inner" or "hidden".
- Kejawèn: "Javanism", the culture and religious beliefs and practices of the Javanese people of Central Java and East Java. It is "not a religious category, but refers to an ethic and a style of life that is inspired by Javanist thinking".
- Agama Jawa: "The Javanese religion"
- Kepercayaan: "belief", "faith", full term: Kepercayaan kepada Tuhan Yang Maha Esa, (Note: Indonesia: East Java native religion called Aliran Kepercayaan or Kepercayaan Kepada Tuhan Yang Maha Esa, aka Pangistu; its status and treatment of its members by Muslim fundamentalists (2003-June 2004)) "Believer in One Mighty God". "Kepercayaan" is an official cover term for various forms of mysticism in Indonesia. According to Caldarola, it "is not an apt characterization of what the mystical groups have in common". It includes kebatinan, kejiwan and kerohanian.

Kebatinan is the inward cultivation of inner peace, rooted in pre-Islamic traditions, whereas kejawèn is outward and community-oriented, manifesting in rituals and practices.

== History ==
Java has been a melting pot of religions and cultures, which has created a broad range of religious beliefs, including animism, spirit cults, and cosmology.

=== Hinduism and Buddhism ===
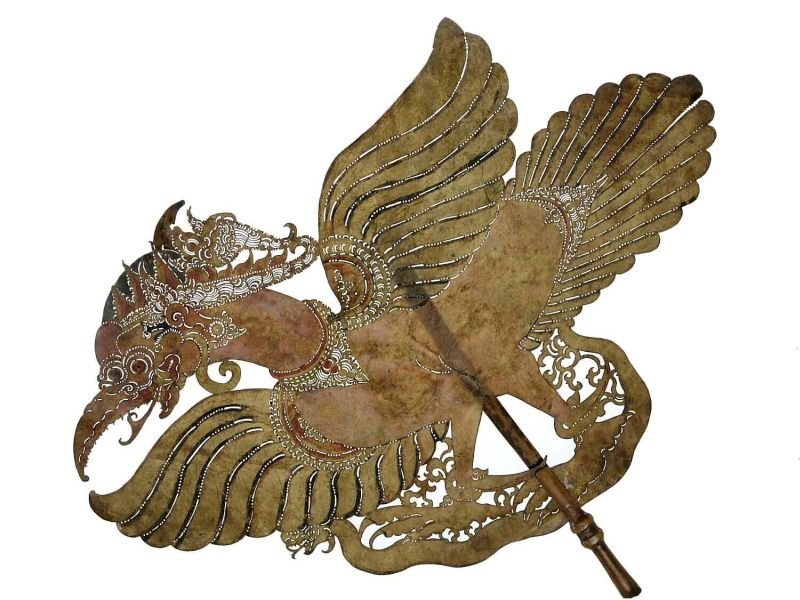
A Wayang puppet representing Garuda

Indian influences came firstly in the form of Hinduism, which reached the Indonesian Archipelago as early as the first century. By the fourth century, the kingdom of Kutai in East Kalimantan, Tarumanagara in West Java, and Holing (Kalingga) in Central Java, were among the early Hindu states established in the region. Several notable ancient Indonesian Hindu kingdoms are: Mataram, famous for the construction of the majestic Prambanan temple, followed by Kediri and Singhasari. Since then, Hinduism, along with Buddhism, spread across the archipelago and reached the peak of its influence in the fourteenth century. The last and largest of the Hindu-Buddhist Javanese empires, that of the Majapahit, influenced the entire Indonesian archipelago.

Hinduism and Buddhism penetrated deeply into all aspects of society, blending with the indigenous tradition and culture. One conduit for this was the ascetics, called "resi," (Sanskrit rishi) who taught a variety of mystical practices. A resi lived surrounded by students, who took care of their master's daily needs. Resi's authorities were merely ceremonial. At the courts, Brahmanas clerics and pudjangga (sacred literati) legitimized rulers and linked Hindu cosmology to their political needs. Presently, small Hindu enclaves are scattered throughout Java, but there is a large Hindu population along the eastern coast nearest Bali, especially around the town of Banyuwangi.

=== Islam ===
Java adopted (Note: Bruinessen: "Java was converted to Islam quite late; the process started seriously around 1500CE, that is, at the time of the great Alevi rebellions. Adoption of Islam is perhaps a better term than conversion, for the Javanese were deliberately syncretistic. For many of the new Muslims, Islam, especially in its Sufi variety, was a welcome additional source of spiritual power, not a substitute for what they already had.") Islam around 1500 CE. Islam was first accepted by the elites and upper echelons of society, which contributed to its further spread and acceptance. Sufism and other versions of Folk Islam were most easily integrated into the existing folk religion of Java. The learned versions of Sufi Islam and Shari`a-oriented Islam were integrated at the courts, blending with the rituals and myths of the existing Hindu-Buddhist culture. Clifford Geertz described this as abangan and priyayi; "the lower class and elite varieties of Javanese syncretism".

The Kyai, the Muslim scholar of the writ, became the new religious elite as Hindu influences receded. Islam recognises no hierarchy of religious leaders nor a formal priesthood, but the Dutch colonial government established an elaborate rank order for the mosque and other Islamic preaching schools. In Javanese pesantren (Islamic schools), The Kyai perpetuated the tradition of the resi. Students around him provided his needs, even peasants around the school.

=== Christianity ===
Early 16th century, Christianity was brought to Java by Portuguese traders and missionaries, from the Dutch Reformed Church, and in the 20th century, also by Roman Catholics, such as the Jesuits and the Divine Word Missionaries. Nowadays there are Christian communities, mostly Reformed in the larger cities, though some rural areas of south-central Java are strongly Roman Catholic.

=== Theosophy ===
Kejawèn is also influenced by Theosophy. Theosophy was a very popular religion among Dutch residents in the Dutch East Indies in the early 20th century. Also, many influential Indonesians joined the Theosophical Society. The Theosophical Society "played a role in the growth" of Kejawèn in the early and mid-twentieth century, and several kebatinan groups were founded by Theosophists. The kebatinan Budi Setia group, founded in 1949, considered "its formal transformation into a theosophical lodge".

== Islam and kebatinan ==
Although the overwhelming majority of the population of Java is nominally Muslim, kejawen, the syncretic Javanese culture, is a strong undercurrent.

Some Javanese texts relate stories about Syekh Siti Jenar (also known as Syekh Lemah Abang) who had conflicts with the Wali Sanga, the nine Islamic scholars in Java, and the Sultanate of Demak.

With the Islamisation of Java, there emerged a loosely structured society of religious leadership revolving around kyais, Islamic experts possessing various degrees of proficiency in pre-Islamic and Islamic lore, belief, and practice. The Kyais are the principal intermediaries between the village masses and the realm of the supernatural. However, this very looseness of the Kyai leadership structure has promoted schism. There were often sharp divisions between orthodox kyais, who merely instructed in Islamic law, with those who taught mysticism and those who sought reformed Islam with modern scientific concepts.

As a result, the Javanese recognize two broad streams of religious commitment: (Note: Anthropologist Clifford Geertz made a well-known, though criticised, threefold distinction between abangan, antri and priyayi. The priyayi are the descendants of the high class and court members, were gurus taught the Hindu-Buddhist art of inner cultivation, which stayed alive in the interior areas of Java. Geertz noticed that the priyayi play a central role in the teaching of kejawen and kebatinan to the abangan.)

1. Santri or putihan ("pure ones") are those who pray, performing the five obligatory daily ritual prayers. They are more orthodox in their Islamic belief and practice, and oppose the abangan, whom they consider to be heterodox.
2. Abangan, "the red ones", who do not strictly observe the Islamic rituals. They have mixed pre-Islamic animistic and Hindu-Buddhist concepts with a superficial acceptance of Islamic belief, and emphasize the importance of the purity of the inner person, the batin.

This distinction between "the High Islam or scripturalist, shari`a-oriented Islam of the `ulama" and "living local Islam" or "Folk Islam" or "popular Islam" is not restricted to Java but can be found in other Islamic countries as well.

Ernest Gellner has developed an influential model of Muslim society, in which this dichotomy is central:

He sees a dialectical relationship between the two, with periods of scripturalist dominance followed by relapses into emotional, mystical, magical folk Islam. Modernity — especially urbanisation and mass literacy — unsettles the balance between the two by eroding the social bases of folk Islam. An irreversible shift to scripturalist Islam occurs, which is, in Gellner’s view is the equivalent of secularisation in the West.

Bruinessen finds this too limited and distinguishes three overlapping spheres:

1. Shari`a-oriented Islam,
2. Sufism (mystical Islam, which has its learned and popular variants),
3. The periphery of local rituals, local shrines, local spirit cults, and heterodox beliefs and practices in general. (Note: Bruinessen: "This third sphere was no doubt in most parts of the world for many years the one that had by far the greatest numbers of adherents. It has often been through Sufism that people from the heterodox periphery gradually moved towards some degree of conformity with orthodoxy.")

Javanese syncretistic religiousness has a strong popular base, outnumbering the santri and the support for Islamic political parties. Choy relates this to a Javanese apparent openness to new religions, but filtering out only those elements which fit into the Javanese culture. Choy mentions several reasons for this nominal Islamic identity:

1. The Islamic scholars in Java have been trained in curricula that were geared toward social conditions of two or three centuries ago, lacking the ability to impart the spirit and sense of Islam;
2. The inability to summarise the principles of Islam in understandable basic points that can be applied to daily life;
3. Kebatinan can be learned and understood without the need to learn Arabic.

In the early 20th century, several groups became formalised, developing systematised teachings and rituals, thus offering a 'high' form of abangan religiosity as an alternative to the 'high' Islam. Bruinessen opines that the kebatinan-movements is a deliberate rejection of scriptural Islam, which arose out of "folk Islam".

== Characteristics ==
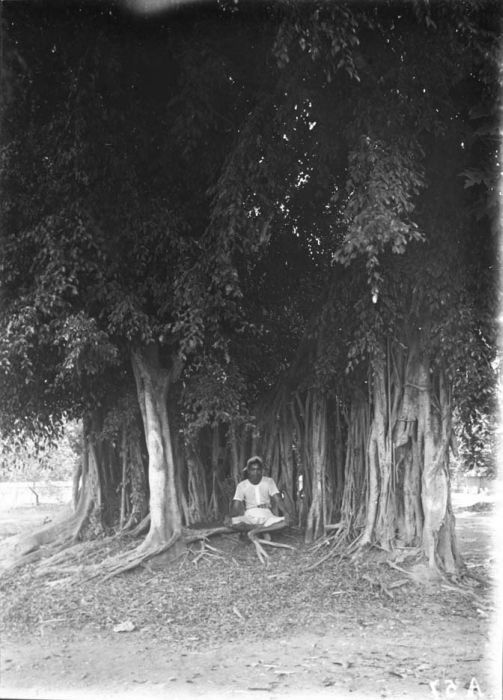
A Javanese man meditating under a Banyan tree. Dutch East Indies, before 1940.

=== Aim ===
Kebatinan is derived from the Arabic word batin, meaning "inner" or "hidden", or "inner self". It is a metaphysical search for harmony within one's inner self, connection with the universe, and with an Almighty God. Kebatinan believes in a "super-consciousness" that can be contacted through meditation.

=== Beliefs ===
Kebatinan is a combination of metaphysics, mysticism, and other esoteric doctrines from Animistic, Hinduistic, Buddhist, and Islamic origins. Although the Javanese culture is tolerant and open to new religions, only those qualities accepted and filtered fit into the Javanese culture, character, and personality. Javanese ideals combine human wisdom (wicaksana), psyche (waskita), and perfection (sempurna). Followers must control their passions, eschewing earthly riches and comforts, so they may one day reach enlightened harmony and union with the spirit of the universe.

According to Choy, the Kebatinan have no certain prophet, sacred book, nor distinct religious festivals and rituals. Nevertheless, various kebatinan-movements have their foundational writings and founders.

A kebatinan practitioner can identify with one of the six officially recognized religions while still subscribing to the kebatinan belief and way of life.

=== Membership ===
Although kebatinan is a predominantly Javanese tradition, it has also attracted practitioners from other ethnic and religious groups, such as Chinese and Buddhists, and foreigners from Australia and Europe. President Suharto counted himself as one of its adherents. Their total membership is difficult to estimate as many of their adherents identify themselves with one of the official religions.

=== Official recognition ===
Although Pancasila, Indonesia's national philosophical foundation, recognizes only the "belief in the one and only God"—which is often justified as the sole recognition of monotheism in the country (Note: Although it was intended for pantheism to flourish as well; the enforcement of monotheism in Indonesia has increased steadily since 1970.)—religions not recognized by the government are also tolerated. A broad plurality of religions and sects exist. In the middle of 1956, the Yogyakarta representative of the Department of Religious Affairs reported 63 religious sects in Java other than the official Indonesian religions. Of these, 22 were in West Java, 35 were in Central Java, and 6 in East Java.

These also include kebatinan-groups, such as Sumarah. This loosely organized current of thought and practice was legitimized in the 1945 constitution, but failed to attain official recognition as a religion. In 1973 it was recognized as Kepercayaan kepada Tuhan Yang Maha Esa (Indonesian: Belief in One Mighty God (Note: Esa has ambiguous meaning which doesn't always mean one, as a result this is an imperfect translation of the phrase.)), but withdrawn from the jurisdiction of the Ministry of Religion and placed under the jurisdiction of the Ministry of Education and Culture.

== Practices ==
A variety of practices is being used in kebatinan to acquire ilmu, (Note: knowledge, power) namely tiraka (Note: "Fasting", "ascetic exercises", "spiritual techniques") and tapa, or tapabrata. (Note: "austerity", "spiritual techniques")

Many Kebatinan followers practice in their own way to seek spiritual and emotional relief. These practices are not performed in churches or mosques, but at home or in caves or on mountain perches. Meditation in Javanese culture is a search for inner self-wisdom and to gain physical strength. This tradition is passed down from generation to generation.

=== Meditation ===
There are several tapa:

- tapa Ngalong (meditation by hanging from a tree)
- tapa Kungkum (meditation under a small waterfall or meeting point of 2-3 rivers / Tempuran / Tjampuhan)

=== Fasting ===
Fasting is a common practice employed by Javanese spiritualists to attain discipline of mind and body to get rid of material and emotional desires:

- pasa Mutih (abstention from eating anything that is salted and sweetened, only eating/drinking pure water & rice)
- pasa Senen-Kemis (fasting on Monday-Thursday)
- pasa Ngebleng (fasting for a longer period, usually 3-5-7 days)

=== Animistic worship ===
Kebatinan often implies animistic worship because it encourages sacrifices and devotions to local and ancestral spirits. These spirits are believed to inhabit natural objects, human beings, artifacts, and grave sites of important wali (Muslim saints). Illness and other misfortunes are traced to such spirits, and if sacrifices or pilgrimages fail to placate angry deities, the advice of a dukun or healer is sought.

=== Other practices ===
Other practices include:

- tapa Pati-Geni (avoiding fire or light for a day or days and isolating oneself in dark rooms),
- tapa Ngadam (stand/walk on foot from sunset till sunset, 24 hours in Silence)

== Historical texts ==
According to Bruinessen, the writing down of kebatinan teachings was a novelty which appeared with the institutionalisation of the kebatinan-movements in the beginning of the 20th century.

== Kebatinan organisations ==
The appearance of formal kebatinan movements reflects the modernisation of Indonesia. Kebatinan movements appeared early in the 1900s in urban traditional elite circles, together with the rise of nationalism and the Muhammadiyah, a modernist Islamic movement. Hardopusoro, one of the earliest kebatinan-movements, had strong links with the Theosophical Society. Some remained very elitist, while others also accepted lower urban and rural followings, thereby popularising abangan, or syncretistic Islam, as an alternative to shari`a-oriented Islam.

After Indonesia gained independence in 1945, the kebatinan received political support and attracted large followings. Kebatinan movements were seen by secular nationalistic elites as allies against the rise of political Islam. The political struggle between the Muslim parties and the Communists and Nationalists led to a sharper demarcation between syncretistic and shari`a-oriented Islam, whereby most kebatinan movements affiliated with the Communist or Nationalist Parties. (Note: The relation between religion c.q. "spirituality", politics and (post-)colonial struggles is not unique to Indonesia. In India, Hindu reform movements involved both religious and social reforms, for example the Brahmo Samaj, Vivekananda, who modernised Advaita Vedanta, Aurobindo and Mahatma Gandhi. In Buddhist countries, Buddhist modernism was a response against the colonial powers and Western culture. In Sri Lanka, Theravada Buddhism was revitalised in the struggle against colonial rule. The Theosophical Society played an essential role here. In China, Taixu propagated a Humanistic Buddhism, which is again endorsed by Jing Hui, the (former) abbott of Bailin Monastery. In Japan, Buddhism adopted nationalistic politics to survive in the modern era, in which it lost support from the government. Zen was popularised in the west by adherents of this modern Buddhism, especially D.T. Suzuki and Hakuun Yasutani.)

Umbrella organisations representing several hundred kebatinan organisations lobbied to attain legitimacy and recognition as an official religion. They are registered at the HKP (Himpunan Penghayat Kepercayaan), which is controlled by the PAKEM (Pengawas Aliran Kepercayaan Masyarakat). After the Suharto-era (1967-1998), the kebatinan-movements lost political support, and have become less dynamic, their adherents avoiding public engagement.

Altogether, several hundred kebatinan-groups are or have been registered, the best-known of which are: (Note: See for a longer list of Kebatinan organisations.)

- Subud
- Sumarah
- Pangestu
- Sapta Dharma
- Majapahit Pancasila

=== Subud ===
Subud was founded in the 1920s by Muhammad Subuh Sumohadiwidjojo. The name Subud was first used in the late 1940s when Subud was legally registered in Indonesia. The basis of Subud is a spiritual exercise commonly referred to as the latihan kejiwaan, which was said by Muhammad Subuh to be guidance from "the Power of God" or "the Great Life Force". Subud aims to attain perfection of character according to the will of God. Only when passion, heart and mind are separated from the inner feeling is it possible to make contact with the "Great Life Force" which permeates everywhere.

Muhammad Subuh saw the present age as one that demands personal evidence and proof of religious or spiritual realities, as people no longer just believe in words. He claimed that Subud is not a new teaching or religion but only that the latihan kejiwaan itself is the kind of proof that humanity is looking for. He also rejected the classification of Subud as a kebatinan organization. There are now Subud groups in about 83 countries, with a worldwide membership of about 10,000.

The name Subud is said to be formed from the Sanskrit words susila ("the good character of man"), bodhi ("the force of the inner self") and dharma ("trust in God"). (Note: SubudBritain, About Subud)

=== Sumarah ===
Sumarah was formed in the 1930s by Pak Hardo, Pak Soekino and Pak Sutadi, without a formal organisation. In those early days, the younger members were taught kanoman, occult practices including invulnerability for knives and guns. This was regarded as essential in the struggle against the Dutch colonial powers. Around 1950, when Indonesia became an independent nation, Sumarah was streamlined and organised by Dr. Surono. The emphasis shifted from magic to "surrender to God". From 1957 on internal struggles surfaced between dr. Surono and the founders Pak Hardo and Pak Sadina, leading to a change in leadership by dr. Ary Muthy in 1967.

Sumarah theology maintains that humankind's soul is like the holy spirit, a spark from the Divine Essence, which means that we are, in essence, similar to God. In other words, "One can find God within oneself," a belief similar to the "I=God" theory found in Hindu-Javanese literature.

According to Sumarah theology, man and his physical and spiritual world are divided into three parts:

- The physical body and brain. One section, Sukusma, governs the passions. In the brain, the faculty of thinking has two functions:
  - To record memories
  - To serve as a means of communion with God
- The invisible world, which is situated within the chest. It is the Jiwa, the ineffable soul, which provides the driving forces governing thought and reason. It is here that the deeper feeling (Rasa) is located.
- The more elusive and sublime world. The most elusive and sublime world is hidden somewhere near the anatomical heart.

Sumarah's conception of God is different from Islam. It has a pantheistic vision of reality, considering God to be present in all living beings.

=== Pangestu ===
Pangestu was founded in 1949. Its doctrine was revealed in 1932 to Sunarto Mertowarjoyo, and written down in the Setat Sasangka Djati by R.T. Harjoparakowo and R. Trihardono Sumodiharjo Pangastu. It describes the way to obtain wahyu, the blessing of God.

=== Sapta Dharma ===
Sapta Dharma was founded in 1952 by Harjo Sapura, after he received a revelation. According to Sri Pawenang, it was God's wish to provide the Indonesian people with a new spirituality in a time of crisis. Its aim is to free man of his passions.

According to Sapta Dharma teachings, suji (meditation) is necessary to pierce through different layers of obstacles to reach Semar, the guardian spirit of Java. Theory and practice resemble Hindu Kundalini yoga, aiming at awakening the Kundalini energy and guiding it through the chakras.

=== Majapahit Pancasila ===
Majapahit Pancasila (Note: Full "Sanaata Dharma Majapahit Pancasila", acronym "Sadhar Mapan") was founded by W. Hardjanta Pardjapangarsa. It is based in Javanese Hindu-yogic practices, c.q. Kundalini yoga, rather than Balinese ritual practice as is prevalent in Parisada Hindu Dharma. According to Hardjanta, his meditation practices also lead to invulnerability for knives, daggers and other weapons.

== Spread of Kebatinan ==
=== Malaysia ===
Kebatinan beliefs have spread to some parts of Malaysia, wherein certain individuals have combined it with Islamic concepts (e.g. proclaiming themselves to be new-age Islamic prophets but delivering messages that are a combination of Islamic and kebatinan beliefs). This has led to the Malaysian Islamic authorities declaring elements of kebatinan to be "syirik" (shirk) and un-Islamic. Kebatinan interpretations of Islam are widespread in Malaysia among practitioners of silat, traditional healers, and some preachers (such as Ariffin Mohammed and other self-proclaimed Islamic prophets).

=== Netherlands ===
In the Netherlands, the former colonial power in Indonesia, some kejawèn-groups are active.

=== Singapore ===
Since the majority of Singaporean Malays are of Indonesian descent, particularly from Java, many of Kebatinan are still practiced, usually among older people. However, the practice is still widespread among some Javanese Silat and Kuda Kepang groups, and also traditional shamans.

=== Suriname ===
It was brought to Suriname by Javanese workers in the late 19th century.

== See also ==
Belief systems

- Aliran Kepercayaan – Indonesian official term for syncretic indigenous and new religious beliefs
- Balinese Hinduism – Form of Hinduism practiced in Bali, Indonesia
- Hinduism in Java
- Indonesian Esoteric Buddhism – Esoteric Buddhism found in Maritime Southeast Asia
- Kaharingan – Indonesian folk religion
- Kapitayan – Belief of ancient people on Java island
- Marapu – Tribal religion in Indonesia
- Mythology of Indonesia
- Parmalim – Traditional religion of the Batak people
- Saminism Movement – Indonesian nationalist movement
- Sunda Wiwitan – Indonesian ethnic religion

Gods and rituals

- Dewi Sri – Hindu Goddess of rice and fertility in Indonesia
- Hyang – Spiritual entity in Java-Bali mythology
- Javanese sacred places – Locations in Java, Indonesia
- Kuda Lumping – Indonesian traditional dance
- Nyai Roro Kidul – Indonesian goddess of the sea
- Slametan – Indonesian celebratory meals

== Sources ==
=== Published sources ===
- Azra, Azyumardi (2006), Islam in the Indonesian World: An Account of Institutional Formation, Mizan Pustaka
- Beatty, Andrew (1999), Varieties of Javanese Religion: An Anthropological Account, Cambridge University Press, ISBN 0-521-62473-8
- van Bruinessen, Martin (2000a), Muslims, Minorities and Modernity: The restructuring of heterodoxy in the Middle East and Southeast Asia. Inaugural Lecture
- van Bruinessen, Martin (2000b), "Transformations of Heterodoxy" (PDF), Transformations of Heterodoxy. Inaugural Lecture (condensation), vol. 7, ISIM, Leiden, p. 5
- van Bruinessen, Martin; Howell, Julia Day (2007), Sufism and the 'Modern' in Islam, I.B.Tauris
- Caldarola, Carlo (1982), Religion and Societies: Asia and the Middle East, Walter de Gruyter
- Choy, Lee Khoon (1999), A fragile nation: the Indonesian crisis, World Scientific
- Christomy, Tommy (2008), Signs of the Wali: Narratives at the Sacred Sites in Pamijahan, West Java, ANU E Press
- Epa, Konradus (2010). "Christians refuse to cancel Christmas". UCA News. Archived from the original on 2013-08-20.
- Feuchtwang, Stephen (2010), The Anthropology of Religion, Charisma and Ghosts: Chinese Lessons for Adequate Theory, Walter de Gruyter
- Fields, Rick (1992), How the Swans Came to the Lake. A Narrative History of Buddhism in America, Boston & London: Shambhala
- Geels, Antoon (1997), Subud and the Javanese mystical tradition, Richmond, Surrey: Curzon Press, ISBN 0-7007-0623-2
- Gombrich, Richard (1996), Theravada Buddhism. A Social History From Ancient Benares to Modern Colombo, Routledge
- Headley, Stephen Cavanna (2004), Durga's Mosque: Cosmology, Conversion And Community in Central Javanese Islam, Institute of Southeast Asian Studies
- Hooker, M.B. (1988), Islam in South East Asia, Brill
- Hughes-Freeland, Felicia (2008), Embodied communities: dance traditions and change in Java, Berghahn Books
- Hunt, Stephen J. (2003). Alternative Religions: A Sociological Introduction. Aldershot, Hampshire: Ashgate Publishing. ISBN 0-7546-3410-8.
- van der Kroef, Justus M (1961). "New Religious Sects in Java". Far Eastern Survey. 30 (2): 18–25. doi:10.2307/3024260. JSTOR 3024260.
- Levenda, Peter (2011), Tantric Temples: Eros and Magic in Java, Nicolas-Hays
- Masud, Muḥammad Kalid; Salvatore, Armando; van Bruinessen, Martin (2009), Islam and modernity: key issues and debates, Edinburgh University Press, ISBN 9780748637942
- McDaniel, June (2010). "Agama Hindu Dharma Indonesia as a New Religious Movement: Hinduism Recreated in the Image of Islam". Nova Religio: The Journal of Alternative and Emergent Religions. 14 (1): 93–111. doi:10.1525/nr.2010.14.1.93. JSTOR 10.1525/nr.2010.14.1.93.
- McMahan, David L. (2008), The Making of Buddhist Modernism, Oxford University Press, ISBN 9780195183276
- Muhaimin, Abdul Ghoffir (2006), The Islamic Traditions of Cirebon: Ibadat and Adat Among Javanese Muslims, ANU E Press
- Mulder, Niels (1978), Mysticism & everyday life in contemporary Java: cultural persistence and change, Singapore: Singapore University Press
- Mulder, Niels (2005), Mysticism in Java: Ideology in Indonesia, Kanisius
- Oey, Eric (2000), Adventure Guides: Java Indonesia, Tuttle Publishing
- Ooi, Keat Gin, ed. (2004). Southeast Asia: a historical encyclopedia, from Angkor Wat to East Timor (3 vols). Vol. 3. Santa Barbara: ABC-CLIO. ISBN 978-1576077702. OCLC 646857823. Archived from the original on 2016-08-08.
- Rambachan, Anatanand (1994), The Limits of Scripture: Vivekananda's Reinterpretation of the Vedas, University of Hawaii Press
- Renard, Philip (2010), Non-Dualisme. De directe bevrijdingsweg, Cothen: Uitgeverij Juwelenschip
- Research School of Pacific Studies (1980), Indonesia, Australian perspectives, Volumes 1-3, Australian National University
- Retsikas, Konstantinos (2012), Becoming: An Anthropological Approach to Understandings of the Person in Java, Anthem Press
- Sinari, Ramakant (2000), Advaita and Contemporary Indian Philosophy. In: Chattopadhyana (gen.ed.), "History of Science, Philosophy and Culture in Indian Civilization. Volume II Part 2: Advaita Vedanta", Delhi: Centre for Studies in Civilizations
- Stange, Paul (1980), The Sumarah movement in Javanese mysticism. Thesis (Ph.D.) University of Wisconsin-Madison, University Microfilms International
- Tarling, N. (1992), The Cambridge History of Southeast Asia: The nineteenth and twentieth centuries. Volume two, Cambridge University Press
- Victoria, Brian Daizen (2006), Zen at war (Second ed.), Lanham e.a.: Rowman & Littlefield Publishers, Inc.
