= Saluan language =

Austronesian language spoken in Sulawesi, Indonesia

Saluan
- Loinang
- Region: Sulawesi, Indonesia
- Ethnicity: Saluan people
- Native speakers: (76,000 cited 1978)
- Language family: Austronesian: Malayo-Polynesian; Celebic; Saluan–Banggai; Saluanic; Saluan

Language codes
- ISO 639-3: loe
- Glottolog: salu1253
- ELP: Saluan

Saluan, also known as Loinang after one of its dialects, is the main language spoken by the Saluan people on the eastern peninsula of the island of Sulawesi.

== Phonology ==
Consonants
		Labial	Alveolar	Palatal	Velar	Glottal
Nasal		m	n	ɲ	ŋ	
Plosive/ Affricate	voiceless	p	t		k	ʔ
Plosive/ Affricate	voiced	b	d	dʒ	ɡ	
Fricative			s			h
Rhotic			r			
Lateral			l			
Approximant		w		j		

In some dialects, the distinction between /l/, /r/ and /n/ is neutralized to /n/ in word-final position, as in putan 'rope' (pronounced putal in most dialects).

Vowels
	Front	Central	Back
Close	i		u
Mid	e	(ə)	o
Open		a	

The central vowel [ə] is restricted to certain dialects.

In final position, there is a phonemic distinction between long and short vowels, as in /ikuː/ 'tail' vs. /siku/ 'elbow'.
