= Saluan people =

Ethnic group in Indonesia

- A Loinang (Saluan) man, December 1919.

Total population
- 200,000

Regions with significant populations
- Indonesia (Central Sulawesi)

Languages
- Saluan language

Religion
- Islam (majority), Protestantism, Folk religion

Related ethnic groups
- Banggai • Balantak • Andio

The Saluan people are an ethnic group inhabiting the region of Banggai Regency, Central Sulawesi, Indonesia. According to the 2016 population census, the Saluan population is approximately 200,000. The original Saluan are the Loinang people, meaning 'mountain people', corresponding to their traditional home in mountainous areas.

== History ==
The Saluan are a major ethnic group in the Banggai Regency. The name Saluan comes from one of the three children of a former local king: King Saluan was the youngest. The Saluan are divided into several subgroups: Saluan Lingketeng, Saluan Loinang, and Saluan Obo. The main difference between these subgroups lies in their dialects, originating from their respective regions:

- Saluan Lingketeng originate from the interior of Pagimana District;
- Saluan Loinang originate from the interior of Simpang Raya District;
- Saluan Obo originate from the inland border region between Banggai Regency and Tojo Una-Una Regency.

== Language ==
The Saluan language consists of four dialects: Saluan Gonohop (spoken in Gonohop Village, Simpang Raya District, Banggai), Saluan Kintom (spoken in Tolando, Batui District, Banggai, and Alindau, Sindue Tobata District, Donggala), Saluan Kalia (spoken in Kalia Village, To Talatako District, Tojo Una-Una), and Bobongko (spoken in Togean District, Tojo Una-Una). The difference between these dialects ranges from 56% to 74%.

Dialect studies show that Saluan as a whole is a distinct language, with 81%–100% difference compared to other Central Sulawesi languages, such as Pamona.

== Customs and culture ==
Traditional Saluan clothing includes distinct male and female attire, used in welcoming ceremonies, traditional events, and other rituals. Saluan male attire includes a yellow shirt called pakeh nu boune with buttons, while female attire consists of a yellow long skirt called rok mahantan and accessories such as bracelets (potto), chains (kalong), hair ornaments (suntiang), earrings (suntiang, jaling), belts (ban pinggang), and necklaces (matahari).

The Saluan practice a welcoming ritual called umapos, where two men perform ceremonial roles, offering respect and protection to visiting guests. Guests of goodwill are then greeted with yellow rice thrown in the direction of the guests and their boats, along with praises to God through song.

Another important Saluan custom is tooth filing, known as monggisin, a mandatory ritual for young men and women before entering adulthood or marriage. This practice is especially common among the Loinang subgroup.

== Gallery ==
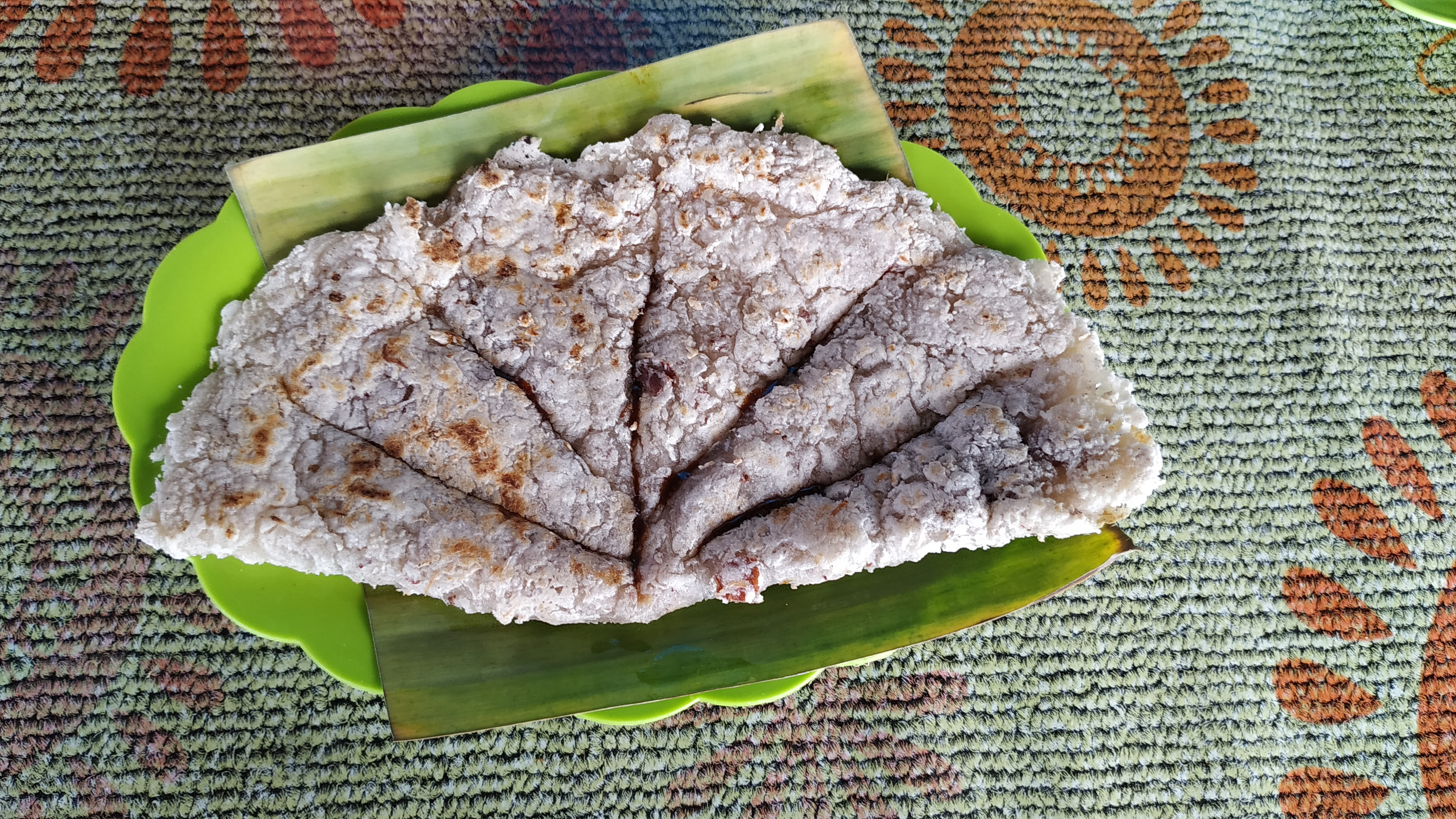
Jepa, baked sago cakes filled with palm sugar

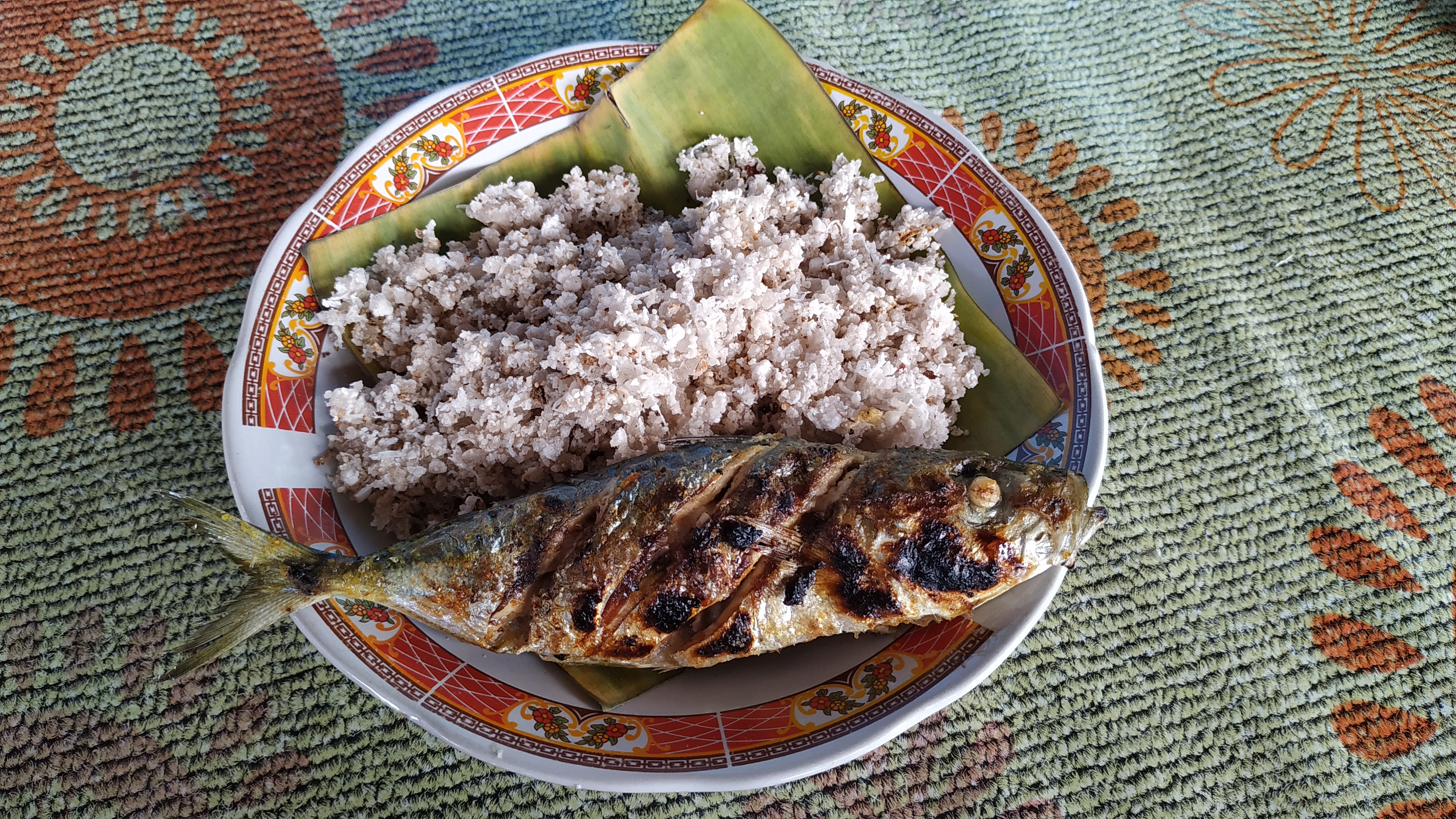
Sinole, a granulated processed sago food
