= Enim people =

Ethnic group in Indonesia

Enim
Total population
- 163,628

Regions with significant populations
- Indonesia (South Sumatra)

Languages
- South Barisan Malay

Religion
- Sunni Islam

Related ethnic groups
- Malay, Basemah, Lematang, Rambang, Ogan, Daya

The Enim people are a sub-ethnic group of Malay people who mostly reside in the South Sumatra Province of Indonesia.

The Enim people live along the Enim River in Muara Enim Regency (Muara Enim, Lawang Kidul, Tanjung Agung, Panang Enim). Their main language is South Barisan Malay. According to the last census (2010), the Enim population was estimated at 163,628 people.
