= Aliran Kepercayaan =

Indonesian official term for syncretic indigenous and new religious beliefs

Followers of aliran kepercayaan in districts of Indonesia (2022)

Aliran Kepercayaan (Note: Full: Kepercayaan kepada Tuhan Yang Maha Esa, "Believer of One Supreme God".) (lit. 'the branches/flows of beliefs') is an official cover term for groups of followers of various religious movements. It also includes various, partly syncretic forms of mysticism of new religious movements in Indonesia, such as kebatinan, kejiwaan and kerohanian. In the Indonesian language, it is also used for new religious movements in other parts of the world. Based on data collected by the Indonesian Conference on Religion and Peace (ICRP), there are about 245 indigenous religions in Indonesia.

== Characteristics ==
According to Caldarola, kepercayaan "is not an apt characterization of what the mystical groups have in common". The US State Department's states:

Sizeable populations in Java, Kalimantan, and Papua practice animism and other types of traditional belief systems termed "Aliran Kepercayaan." Many of those who practice Kepercayaan describe it as more of a meditation-based spiritual path than a religion. Some animists combine their beliefs with one of the government-recognized religions.

== Recognition ==
Indonesia's Constitutional Court in November 2017 ruled that followers of faiths outside the 6 recognized religions are allowed to state "Kepercayaan kepada Tuhan YME (Note: Full: Yang Maha Esa)" on their national identity cards, as a 7th category for Aliran Kepercayaan after judicial review launched by followers of Marapu religion, the Parmalim, Kaharingan, and Sapta Darma.

== Examples ==
=== Sumatra ===
- Adat Batin (Batin)
- Arat Sabulungan (Mentawai)
- Fanömba Adu (Nias)
- Parmalim (Toba Batak)
- Pemena (Karo Batak)

=== Java ===
- Kapitayan and Kejawen (Javanese)
- Sunda Wiwitan (Baduy and Sundanese)

=== Lesser Sunda Islands ===
- Dinitu (Rotenese)
- Jingi Tiu (Savu)
- Marapu (Sumba)
- Pare No Bongi (Bimanese)
- Tung Piong (Sikka)
- Uis Neno-Uis Pah (Atoni)
- Wetu Telu (Sasak)

=== Kalimantan ===
- Kaharingan (Dayak)

=== Sulawesi ===
- Adat Musi (Talaud)
- Aluk Todolo (Toraja)
- Islam Tua (Sangir)
- Lamoa (Pamona)
- Tolotang (Buginese)
- Tonaas Walian (Minahasan)

=== Maluku Islands ===
- Naurus (Alifuru)

=== Papua ===
- Wor (Biak)

== Sources ==
- Budiman, Michaela (2013). Contemporary Funeral Rituals of Sa'dan Toraja: From Aluk Todolo to "New" Religions. Prague: Charles University in Prague. ISBN 978-80-246-2228-6.
- Caldarola, Carlo (1982), Religion and Societies: Asia and the Middle East, Walter de Gruyter
- Ensiklopedi Kepercayaan terhadap Tuhan Yang Maha Esa [Encyclopedia of Beliefs in One God] (in Indonesian) (4th ed.). Jakarta: Direktorat Jenderal Nilai Budaya, Seni dan Film; Direktorat Kepercayaan Terhadap Tuhan Yang Maha Esa. 2010 [2003]. ISBN 978-979-16071-1-7. Archived from the original (PDF) on 2022-07-09.
- Geertz, Clifford (1960). Religion of Java. Glencoe, Il: Free Press. ISBN 978-0-226-28510-8.
- Koentjaraningrat, R. M. (1987). "Javanese Religion". In Eliade, Mircea (ed.). The Encyclopedia of Religion. Vol. 7. New York: MacMillan. pp. 559–63. ISBN 978-0-02-909480-8.
- Maria, Siti; Limbeng, Julianus (2007). Marapu di Pulau Sumba, Provinsi Nusa Tenggara Timur (PDF). Seri pengungkapan nilai-nilai kepercayaan komunitas adat. Jakarta: Departemen Kebudayaan dan Pariwisata; Direktorat Jenderal Nilai Budaya, Seni dan Film; Direktorat Kepercayaan Terhadap Tuhan Yang Maha Esa.
- Matthes, Benjamin F. (1872). Over de bissoe's of heidensche priesters en priesteessen der Boeginezen [On the Bissu, Buginese Pagan Priests] (in Dutch). Amsterdam.
- Metcalf, Peter (1987). "Bornean Religion". In Eliade, Mircea (ed.). The Encyclopedia of Religion. Vol. 2. New York: MacMillan. pp. 290–92. ISBN 978-0-02-909480-8.
- Nooy-Palm, Hetty (1979). The Sa'dan-Toraja: A study of their social life and religion. I: Organization, symbols and beliefs (PDF). The Hague: Martinus Nijhoff. ISBN 978-90-247-2274-7. Archived (PDF) from the original on 12 February 2016.
- ——— (1986). The Sa'dan-Toraja: A study of their social life and religion. II: Rituals of the East and West. Leiden; Boston: BRILL. ISBN 978-90-67-65207-0.
- ——— (1987). "Toraja Religion". In Eliade, Mircea (ed.). The Encyclopedia of Religion. Vol. 14. New York: MacMillan. pp. 565–67. ISBN 978-0-02-909480-8.
- Pelras, Christian (1987). "Bugis Religion". In Eliade, Mircea (ed.). The Encyclopedia of Religion. Vol. 2. New York: MacMillan. pp. 560–61. ISBN 978-0-02-909480-8.
- Popov, Igor (2017). Buku rujukan semua aliran dan perkumpulan agama di Indonesia [The Reference Book on All Religious Branches and Communities in Indonesia] (in Indonesian). Singaraja: Toko Buku Indra Jaya.
- Rodgers, Susan (1981). Adat, Islam, and Christianity in a Batak Homeland. Athens, Ohio: Ohio University. ISBN 978-0-89680-110-3.
- ——— (1987). "Batak Religion". In Eliade, Mircea (ed.). The Encyclopedia of Religion. Vol. 2. New York: MacMillan. pp. 81–83. ISBN 978-0-02-909480-8.
- Rousseau, Jérôme (1998). Kayan Religion: Ritual Life and Religious Reform in Central Borneo. Leiden: KITLV Press. ISBN 978-9067181327.
- Saringendyanti, Etty; Herlina, Nina; Zakaria, Mumuh Muhsin (2018). "Tri Tangtu on Sunda Wiwitan Doctrine in the XIV–XVII Century". Tawarikh: Journal of Historical Studies. 10 (1). Bandung: 1–14. ISSN 2085-0980.
- Schärer, Hans (1963) [1946]. Ngaju Religion: The Conception of God among a South Borneo People. The Hague: Martinus Nijhoff. ISBN 978-90-04-24799-4.
- Schefold, Reimar (1980). Spielzeug für die Seelen — Kunst und Kultur der Mentawai-Inseln (Indonesien) [Toys for the Souls: Art and Culture of the Mentawai (Indonesia)] (in German). Zürich: Museum Rietberg.
- ——— (1988). "De wildernis als cultuur van gene ziijde: tribale concepten van "natuur" in Indonesiο" [The wilderness as a culture of the past: tribal concepts of "nature" in Indonesia]. Antropologische Verkenningen (in Dutch). 7 (4): 5–22.
- Volkman, Toby Alice (1985). Feasts of Honor: Ritual and Change in the Toraja Highlands. Urbana: University of Illinois Press.
- Weinstock, Joseph (1983). Kaharingan and the Luangan Dayaks: Religion and Identity in Central East Borneo. Thesis (Ph.D.) Cornell University.
- Winzeler, Robert L., ed. (1993). The Seen and the Unseen: Shamanism, Mediumship and Possession in Borneo. Williamsburg, Va.: Borneo Research Council. ISBN 978-0-9629568-1-2.
