= Dynamism (metaphysics) =

Philosophical system

Dynamism is a general name for a group of philosophical views concerning the nature of matter. However different they may be in other respects, all these views agree in making matter consist essentially of simple and indivisible units, substances, or forces. Dynamism is sometimes used to denote systems that admit not only matter and extension, but also determinations, tendencies, and forces intrinsic and essential to matter. More properly, however, it means exclusive systems that do away with the dualism of matter and force by reducing the former to the latter.

The word was coined by Thomas Carlyle, who contrasted dynamism with mechanism.

== Leibniz's formulation ==
Dynamism is the metaphysics of Gottfried Leibniz (1646–1716) that reconciles hylomorphic substance theory with mechanistic atomism by way of a pre-established harmony, and which was later developed by Christian Wolff (1679–1754) as a metaphysical cosmology. The major thesis for Leibniz follows as a consequences of his monad, that: “the nature of every substance carries a general expression of the whole universe. [The monad provides] the concept of an individual substance that contains...all its phenomena, such that nothing can happen to substance that is not generated from its own ground...but in conformity to what happens to another”... Whereby Leibniz "counters the tendency inherent in Cartesian and Spinozistic rationalism toward an “isolationist” interpretation of the ontological independence of substance... Leibniz's account of substantial force aims to furnish the complete metaphysical groundwork for a science of dynamics".

In the opening paragraph of Specimen dynamicum (1692), Leibniz begins by clarifying his intention to supersede the Cartesian account of corporeal substance by asserting the priority of force over extension... This allows him to affirm that the Aristotelian principle of form is needed for the philosophical account of nature. He does this in view of four main facets of his doctrine of force: (1) the characterization of force (vis naturae) as that which is constitutive of substance itself; (2) the concern to sharply distinguish this concept of force from the Scholastic notion of potentia; (3) the correlative interpretation of force in terms of conatus or nisus, i.e., as something between mere potency and completed act; and (4) the affirmation of the fundamental correctness of Aristotle’s own concept of form as entelechy, and Leibniz’s corresponding attempt to make this concept fully intelligible.

By superseding the Cartesian concept of corporeal substance and by advocating the Aristotelian principle of form, Leibniz sets the stage for an interpretation of material being in terms different from those of inert matter and externally communicated motion. Leibniz thus retains what he takes to be the rational core of the Aristotelian conception of substance. In effect, Leibniz’s theory of force involves the rehabilitation and reconstruction of the matter-form composite as the pivotal concept of the metaphysics of corporeal nature. Leibniz’s concern to revive the Aristotelian explanatory scheme by means of the concept of substantial force underlies his description of the structural and material features of the aggregation of monads and corporeal interaction. He holds that the following four ontological expressions of substantial force constitute the nature of a complete corporeal substance and supply the grounds of all corporeal interaction: primitive active force, primitive passive force, derivative active force, and derivative passive force.

The analysis of primitive active force (vis activa primitiva) yields the fundamental metaphysical principle that substance perdures through all processes of phenomenally manifested corporeal interaction [and] the basis of the identity of any particular body through the alterations that it undergoes as the result of its interactions with other bodies. It also provides for the continuity and conservation of action within corporeal nature as a whole. Primitive passive force (vis passiva primitiva) is the ground of corporeal extension, by which a body appears as material mass [and capacity] to resist changes in its state of motion and to hinder penetration by other bodies... Derivative active force (vis activa derivativa) results from the modification or limitation of primitive force... that takes the form of the phenomenally manifested conflict of physical bodies... subject to distribution by virtue of this conflict. It therefore does not perdure in any single body during the course of its interaction with other corporeal substances. Since it is comprehensible as the internal action [when] acted upon by some other body or bodies, [with] the capacity to resist... penetration and changes in their states of motion. Derivative passive force (vis passiva derivativa) is the purely quantitative modification of primitive passive force [known] in terms of the measures of any material mass’s resistance to penetration and change in its state of motion.

Leibniz insists that primitive force pertains solely to completely general causes. As a strictly metaphysical principle, it is the object of purely rational apprehension. It is thus not linked immediately to the actual laws of corporeal interaction in the phenomenal realm. On the other hand, derivative force does pertain directly to such observable interaction. Its analysis leads to the systematic formulation of the fundamental laws of corporeal dynamics. These are laws of action that are known not only by reason, but are also proved by the evidence of the senses.

— Jeffrey Edwards, "Leibniz’s Aristotelian Dynamism and the Idea of a Transition from Metaphysics to Corporeal Nature" in Substance, Force, and the Possibility of Knowledge: On Kant's Philosophy of Material Nature

== 20th century and contemporary use ==
Elements of Dynamism can be found in the works of Henri Bergson, and in more contemporary works, such as the process philosophy of Alfred North Whitehead in terms of relations, as well as the systems theory of Ludwig von Bertalanffy and William Ross Ashby. The Basque philosopher Xavier Zubiri, most notably in his works, "On Essence" and "Dynamic Structure of Reality" details of several dynamisms inherent in the universe, beginning with variation, then onto alteration, selfhood, self-possession, living-together, onto Dynamism as a Mode of Being-in-the-world. It is a response to the Philosophy of Spirit via Hegel in addition to reductionists and Heidegger. This concept also has resonances with the Object-oriented ontology and Speculative Realism schools of philosophy.
