= List of Indonesian cities by population =

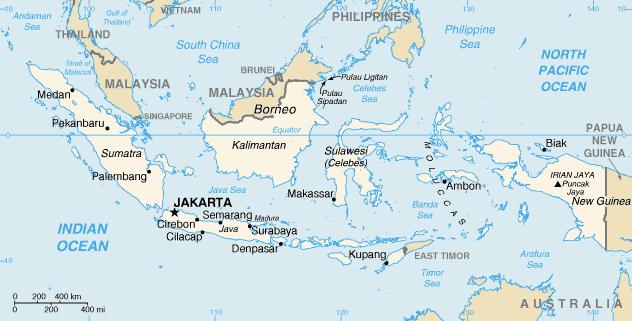
Map of Indonesia

This is a list of all the 95 cities (with regency-level status) in Indonesia, ranked by population. It excludes urban-characterized settlements such as regency seats, which does not have city status. Indonesia has 93 cities classified as kota (city), one provincial-level capital city (Nusantara), and one provincial-level special city (the Special Capital Region of Jakarta). Population figures are taken from the 2020 census and the more recent official estimates as at mid 2024, all by Statistics Indonesia (BPS).

Jakarta is the largest city and the only megacity in Indonesia, with a population of 10.70 million. As a primate city, Jakarta is nearly four times larger than the second largest city Surabaya. Jakarta, along with Capital City of Nusantara, are unique compared to other cities in Indonesia, since they are technically provinces with a city management. Jakarta is subdivided into five administrative cities and an administrative regency, which are not self-governed (without municipal council nor government budget). Each of Jakarta's five satellite cities also have passed the one million mark in population, with the largest one being Bekasi, while the others are Depok, Tangerang, South Tangerang and Bogor.

The other largest cities by region include Medan (Sumatra, also the largest outside of Java), Samarinda (Kalimantan), Denpasar (Lesser Sunda Islands), Makassar (Sulawesi), Ambon (Maluku Islands), and Jayapura (Western New Guinea). Over the decade from 2010 to 2020, Jayapura was also the fastest-growing city in Indonesia, at 70% in that decade. As of the 2020 census, there are a total of fourteen cities in Indonesia exceeding a population of one million people, and about 32.6 million people live in these fourteen cities (or 12.07% of Indonesia's population of 270.2 million people as of the 2020 census).

Most of the provinces' largest cities in Indonesia are also their capital cities. The exceptions are Bekasi (West Java), Tangerang (Banten), Batam (Riau Islands), Banjarmasin (South Kalimantan), Tarakan (North Kalimantan), and Ternate (North Maluku).

== Cities by population ==
- Bold: province's capital city
- Italics: province's largest city

| City | Province | Region | 2020 census | 2010 census | Change 2010 to 2020 | mid 2024 or 2025 official estimate | Notes |
|---|---|---|---|---|---|---|---|
| **Jakarta** | Special Capital Region of Jakarta | Java | 10,562,088 | 7,007,787 | +50.72% | 10,684,946 | |
| **Surabaya** | East Java | Java | 2,874,314 | 2,765,487 | +3.94% | 2,921,996 | |
| Bekasi | West Java | Java | 2,543,676 | 2,334,871 | +8.94% | 2,644,058 | Satellite city of Jakarta |
| **Bandung** | West Java | Java | 2,444,160 | 2,394,873 | +2.06% | 2,528,160 | |
| **Medan** | North Sumatra | Sumatra | 2,435,252 | 2,097,610 | +16.10% | 2,494,512 | Most populated city outside of Java |
| Depok | West Java | Java | 2,056,335 | 1,738,570 | +18.28% | 2,163,635 | Satellite city of Jakarta |
| Tangerang | Banten | Java | 1,895,486 | 1,798,601 | +5.39% | 1,963,970 | Satellite city of Jakarta |
| **Palembang** | South Sumatra | Sumatra | 1,668,848 | 1,455,284 | +14.68% | 1,718,440 | |
| **Semarang** | Central Java | Java | 1,653,524 | 1,555,984 | +6.27% | 1,702,379 | |
| **Makassar** | South Sulawesi | Sulawesi | 1,423,877 | 1,338,663 | +6.37% | 1,474,393 | Most populated city of Eastern Indonesia |
| South Tangerang | Banten | Java | 1,354,350 | 1,290,322 | +4.96% | 1,399,500 | Satellite city of Jakarta |
| Batam | Riau Islands | Sumatra | 1,196,396 | 944,285 | +26.70% | 1,256,610 | |
| Bogor | West Java | Java | 1,043,070 | 950,334 | +9.76% | 1,078,351 | Satellite city of Jakarta |
| **Bandar Lampung** | Lampung | Sumatra | 1,166,066 | 881,801 | +32.24% | 1,214,330 | |
| **Pekanbaru** | Riau | Sumatra | 983,356 | 897,767 | +9.53% | 1,123,348 | |
| **Padang** | West Sumatra | Sumatra | 909,040 | 833,562 | +9.05% | 942,938 | |
| **Samarinda** | East Kalimantan | Kalimantan | 827,994 | 727,500 | +13.81% | 861,878 | |
| Malang | East Java | Java | 843,810 | 820,243 | +2.87% | 872,694 | |
| Tasikmalaya | West Java | Java | 716,155 | 635,464 | +12.70% | 750,730 | |
| **Serang** | Banten | Java | 692,101 | 577,785 | +19.79% | 734,870 | |
| Balikpapan | East Kalimantan | Kalimantan | 688,318 | 557,579 | +23.45% | 738,532 | |
| Banjarmasin | South Kalimantan | Kalimantan | 657,663 | 625,481 | +5.15% | 675,915 | |
| **Pontianak** | West Kalimantan | Kalimantan | 658,685 | 554,764 | +18.73% | 675,468 | |
| **Denpasar** | Bali | Lesser Sunda Islands | 725,314 | 788,589 | −8.02% | 660,984 | |
| **Jambi** | Jambi | Sumatra | 606,200 | 531,857 | +13.98% | 627,774 | |
| Cimahi | West Java | Java | 568,400 | 541,177 | +5.03% | 598,700 | Satellite city of Bandung |
| Surakarta | Central Java | Java | 522,364 | 499,337 | +4.61% | 589,242 | |
| **Kupang** | East Nusa Tenggara | Lesser Sunda Islands | 442,758 | 336,239 | +31.68% | 466,632 | |
| **Manado** | North Sulawesi | Sulawesi | 451,916 | 410,481 | +10.09% | 458,582 | |
| Cilegon | Banten | Java | 434,896 | 374,559 | +16.11% | 455,620 | |
| **Mataram** | West Nusa Tenggara | Lesser Sunda Islands | 429,651 | 402,843 | +6.65% | 441,147 | |
| **Jayapura** | Papua | Western New Guinea | 398,478 | 256,705 | +55.23% | 414,862 | |
| **Bengkulu** | Bengkulu | Sumatra | 373,591 | 308,544 | +21.08% | 391,117 | |
| **Palu** | Central Sulawesi | Sulawesi | 373,218 | 336,532 | +10.90% | 387,493 | |
| **Yogyakarta** | Special Region of Yogyakarta | Java | 373,589 | 388,627 | −3.87% | 375,780 | |
| Sukabumi | West Java | Java | 346,325 | 298,681 | +15.95% | 365,740 | |
| **Ambon** | Maluku | Maluku Islands | 347,288 | 331,254 | +4.84% | 354,052 | |
| **Kendari** | Southeast Sulawesi | Sulawesi | 345,107 | 289,966 | +19.02% | 351,085 | |
| Cirebon | West Java | Java | 333,303 | 296,389 | +12.45% | 344,851 | |
| Dumai | Riau | Sumatra | 316,782 | 253,803 | +24.81% | 338,064 | |
| Pekalongan | Central Java | Java | 307,150 | 281,434 | +9.14% | 318,221 | |
| **Palangka Raya** | Central Kalimantan | Kalimantan | 293,457 | 220,962 | +32.81% | 305,797 | |
| Binjai | North Sumatra | Sumatra | 291,842 | 246,154 | +18.56% | 303,272 | Satellite city of Medan |
| **Nusantara** | Nusantara Capital City | Kalimantan | - | - | NA | 300,000 | |
| Kediri | East Java | Java | 286,796 | 268,507 | +6.81% | 298,227 | |
| **Sorong** | Southwest Papua | Western New Guinea | 284,410 | 190,625 | +49.20% | 294,978 | |
| Pematangsiantar | North Sumatra | Sumatra | 268,254 | 234,698 | +14.30% | 274,838 | |
| **Banjarbaru** | South Kalimantan | Kalimantan | 253,442 | 199,627 | +26.96% | 272,763 | Satellite city of Banjarmasin |
| Tegal | Central Java | Java | 273,825 | 239,599 | +14.28% | 294,477 | |
| **Banda Aceh** | Aceh | Sumatra | 252,899 | 223,446 | +13.18% | 261,969 | |
| Tarakan | North Kalimantan | Kalimantan | 242,786 | 193,370 | +25.56% | 249,960 | |
| Probolinggo | East Java | Java | 239,649 | 217,062 | +10.41% | 249,539 | |
| Singkawang | West Kalimantan | Kalimantan | 235,064 | 186,462 | +26.07% | 246,112 | |
| Lubuklinggau | South Sumatra | Sumatra | 234,166 | 201,308 | +16.32% | 246,046 | |
| Padangsidimpuan | North Sumatra | Sumatra | 225,105 | 191,531 | +17.53% | 236,217 | |
| **Tanjungpinang** | Riau Islands | Sumatra | 227,663 | 187,359 | +21.51% | 234,840 | |
| Bitung | North Sulawesi | Sulawesi | 225,134 | 187,652 | +19.97% | 232,440 | Satellite city of Manado |
| **Pangkalpinang** | Bangka Belitung Islands | Sumatra | 218,569 | 174,758 | +25.07% | 226,297 | |
| Batu | East Java | Java | 213,046 | 190,184 | +12.02% | 222,685 | |
| Pasuruan | East Java | Java | 208,006 | 186,262 | +11.67% | 219,392 | |
| Banjar | West Java | Java | 200,973 | 175,157 | +14.74% | 209,790 | |
| **Gorontalo** | Gorontalo | Sulawesi | 198,539 | 180,127 | +10.22% | 205,390 | |
| Ternate | North Maluku | Maluku Islands | 205,001 | 185,705 | +10.39% | 204,920 | |
| Madiun | East Java | Java | 195,175 | 170,964 | +14.16% | 201,767 | |
| Salatiga | Central Java | Java | 192,322 | 170,332 | +12.91% | 198,971 | Satellite city of Semarang |
| Prabumulih | South Sumatra | Sumatra | 193,196 | 161,984 | +19.27% | 203,312 | |
| Lhokseumawe | Aceh | Sumatra | 188,713 | 171,163 | +10.25% | 196,067 | |
| Langsa | Aceh | Sumatra | 185,971 | 148,945 | +24.86% | 194,730 | |
| Bontang | East Kalimantan | Kalimantan | 178,917 | 143,683 | +24.52% | 189,968 | |
| Tanjungbalai | North Sumatra | Sumatra | 176,027 | 154,445 | +13.97% | 183,170 | |
| Tebing Tinggi | North Sumatra | Sumatra | 172,838 | 145,248 | +19.00% | 178,914 | |
| Metro | Lampung | Sumatra | 168,676 | 145,471 | +15.95% | 175,710 | |
| Palopo | South Sulawesi | Sulawesi | 184,681 | 147,932 | +24.84% | 177,526 | |
| Bima | West Nusa Tenggara | Lesser Sunda Islands | 155,140 | 142,579 | +8.81% | 161,362 | |
| Baubau | Southeast Sulawesi | Sulawesi | 159,248 | 136,991 | +16.25% | 161,280 | |
| Parepare | South Sulawesi | Sulawesi | 151,454 | 129,262 | +17.17% | 160,309 | |
| Blitar | East Java | Java | 149,149 | 131,968 | +13.02% | 154,867 | |
| Pagar Alam | South Sumatra | Sumatra | 143,844 | 126,181 | +14.00% | 149,199 | |
| Payakumbuh | West Sumatra | Sumatra | 139,576 | 116,825 | +19.47% | 144,830 | |
| Gunungsitoli | North Sumatra | Sumatra | 136,017 | 126,202 | +7.78% | 142,890 | |
| Mojokerto | East Java | Java | 132,434 | 120,196 | +10.18% | 137,393 | Satellite city of Surabaya |
| Bukittinggi | West Sumatra | Sumatra | 121,028 | 111,312 | +8.73% | 124,047 | |
| Kotamobagu | North Sulawesi | Sulawesi | 123,722 | 107,459 | +15.13% | 123,918 | |
| Magelang | Central Java | Java | 121,526 | 118,227 | +2.79% | 128,709 | |
| Tidore Islands | North Maluku | Maluku Islands | 114,480 | 90,055 | +27.12% | 118,613 | |
| Tomohon | North Sulawesi | Sulawesi | 100,587 | 91,553 | +9.87% | 103,072 | Satellite city of Manado |
| Sungai Penuh | Jambi | Sumatra | 96,610 | 82,293 | +17.40% | 99,771 | |
| Subulussalam | Aceh | Sumatra | 90,751 | 67,446 | +34.55% | 97,770 | |
| Pariaman | West Sumatra | Sumatra | 94,224 | 79,043 | +19.21% | 97,206 | |
| Sibolga | North Sumatra | Sumatra | 89,584 | 84,481 | +6.04% | 91,265 | |
| Tual | Maluku | Maluku Islands | 88,280 | 58,082 | +51.99% | 90,007 | |
| Solok | West Sumatra | Sumatra | 73,438 | 59,396 | +23.64% | 77,842 | |
| Sawahlunto | West Sumatra | Sumatra | 65,138 | 56,866 | +14.55% | 67,760 | |
| Padang Panjang | West Sumatra | Sumatra | 56,311 | 47,008 | +19.79% | 58,627 | |
| Sabang | Aceh | Sumatra | 41,197 | 30,653 | +34.40% | 43,527 | |

== Gallery ==
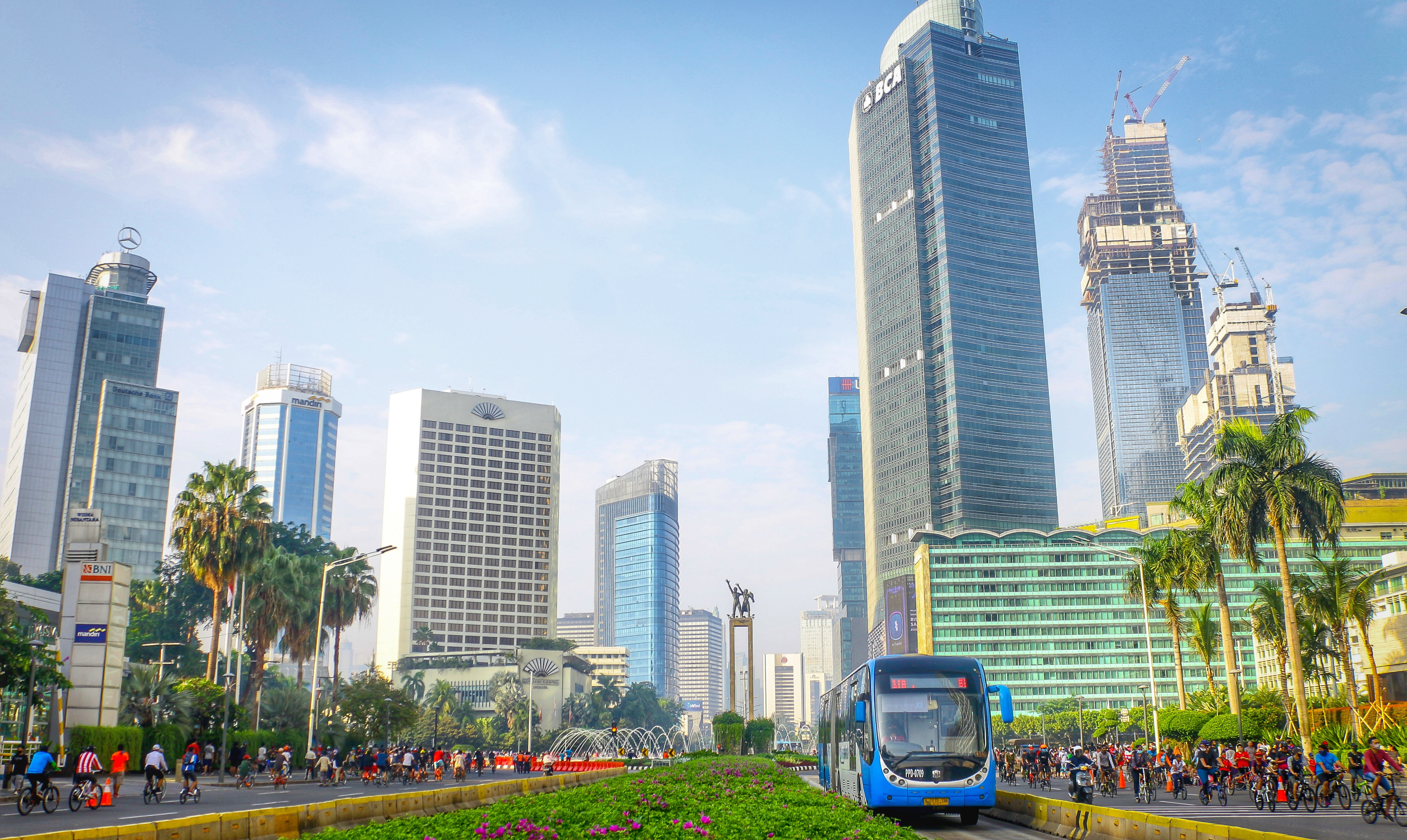
Jakarta

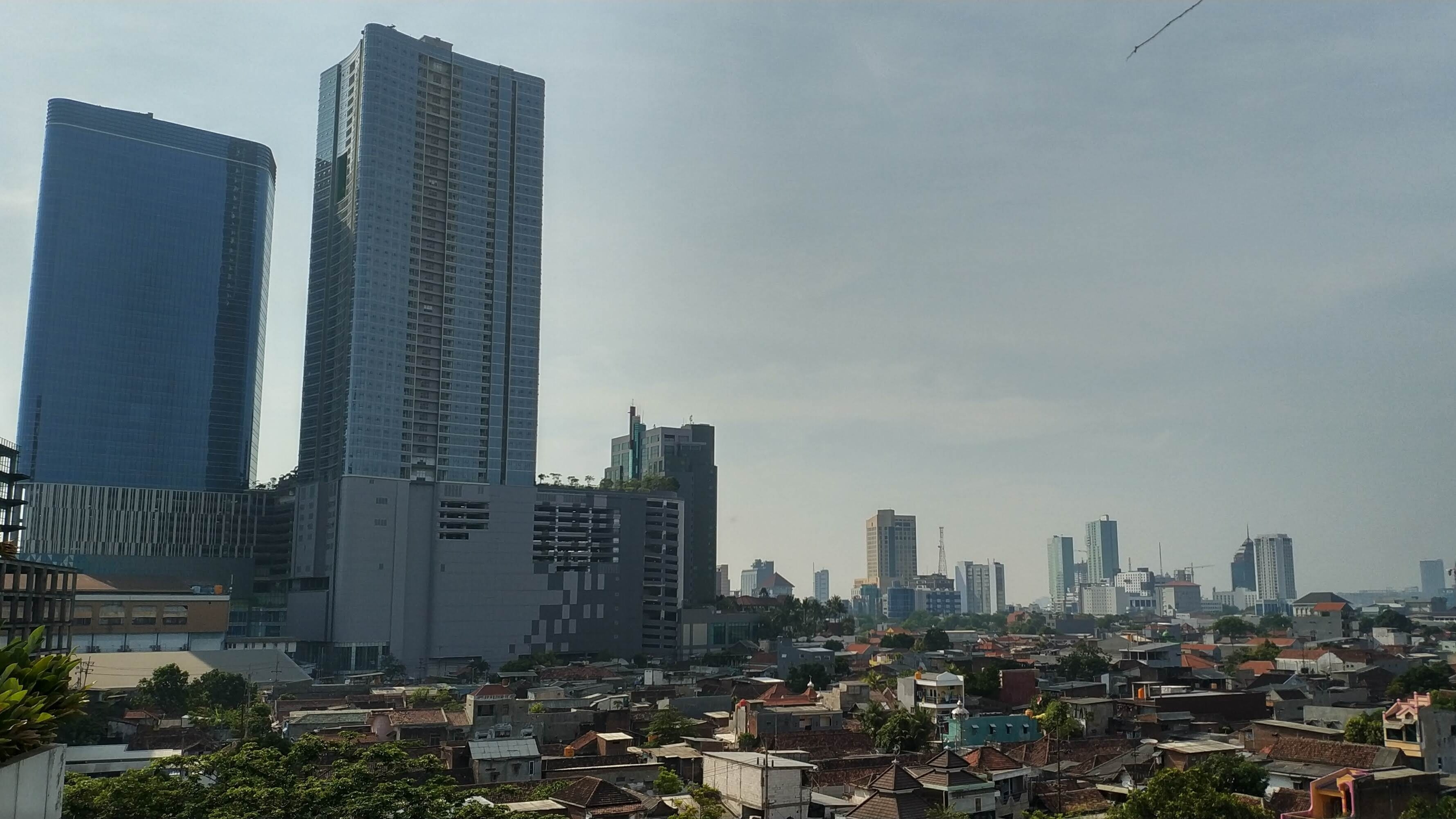
Surabaya

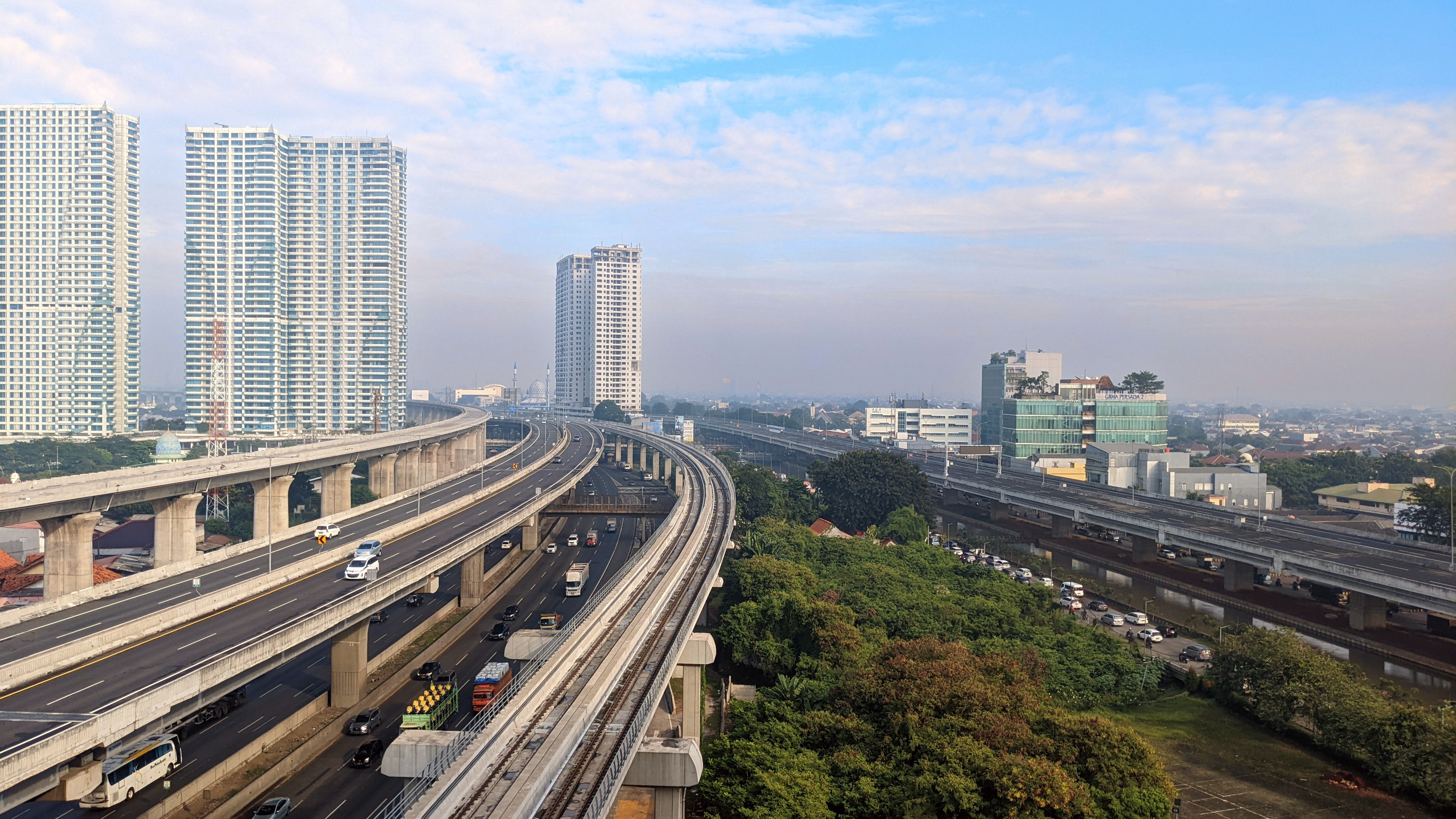
Bekasi

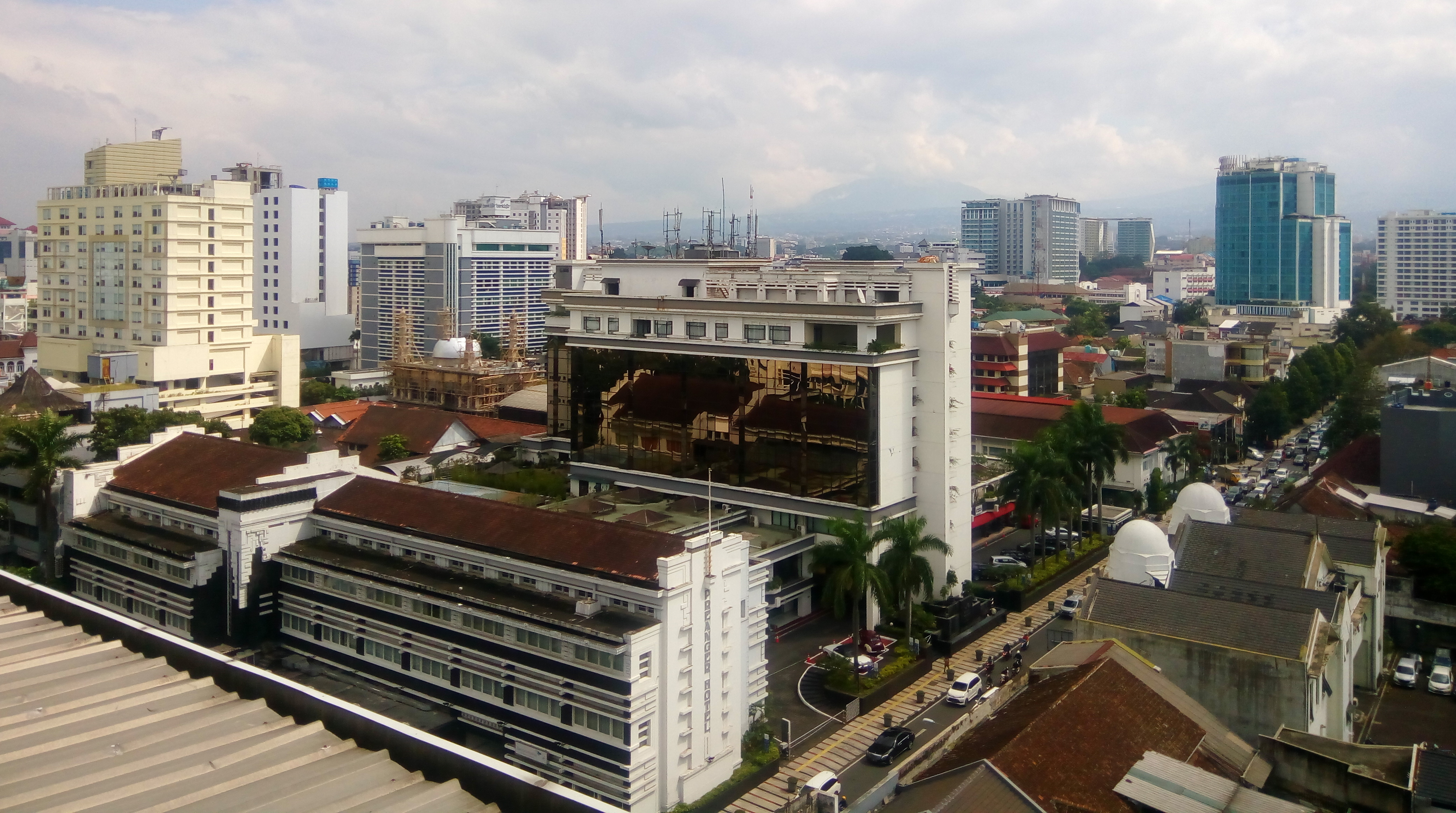
Bandung

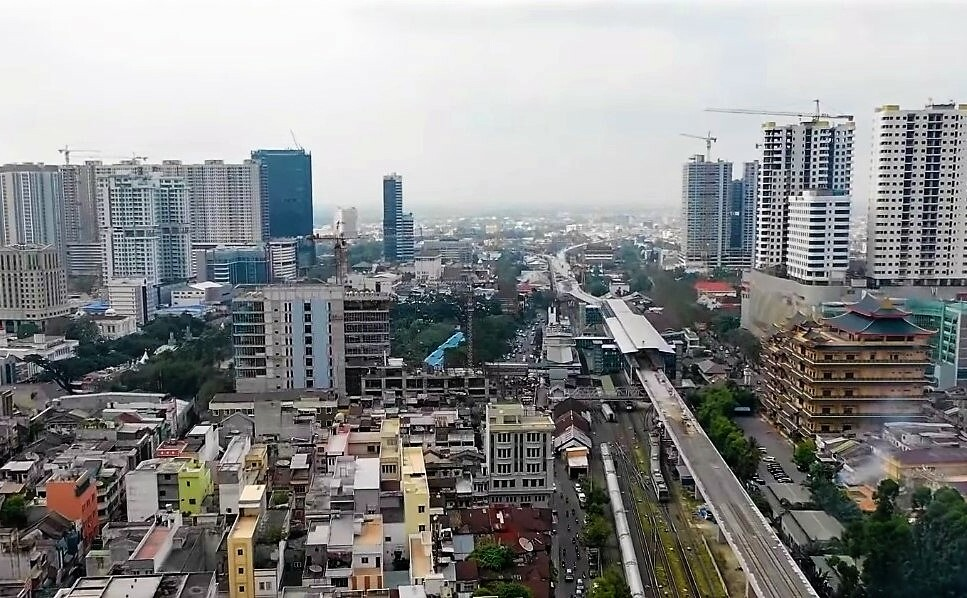
Medan

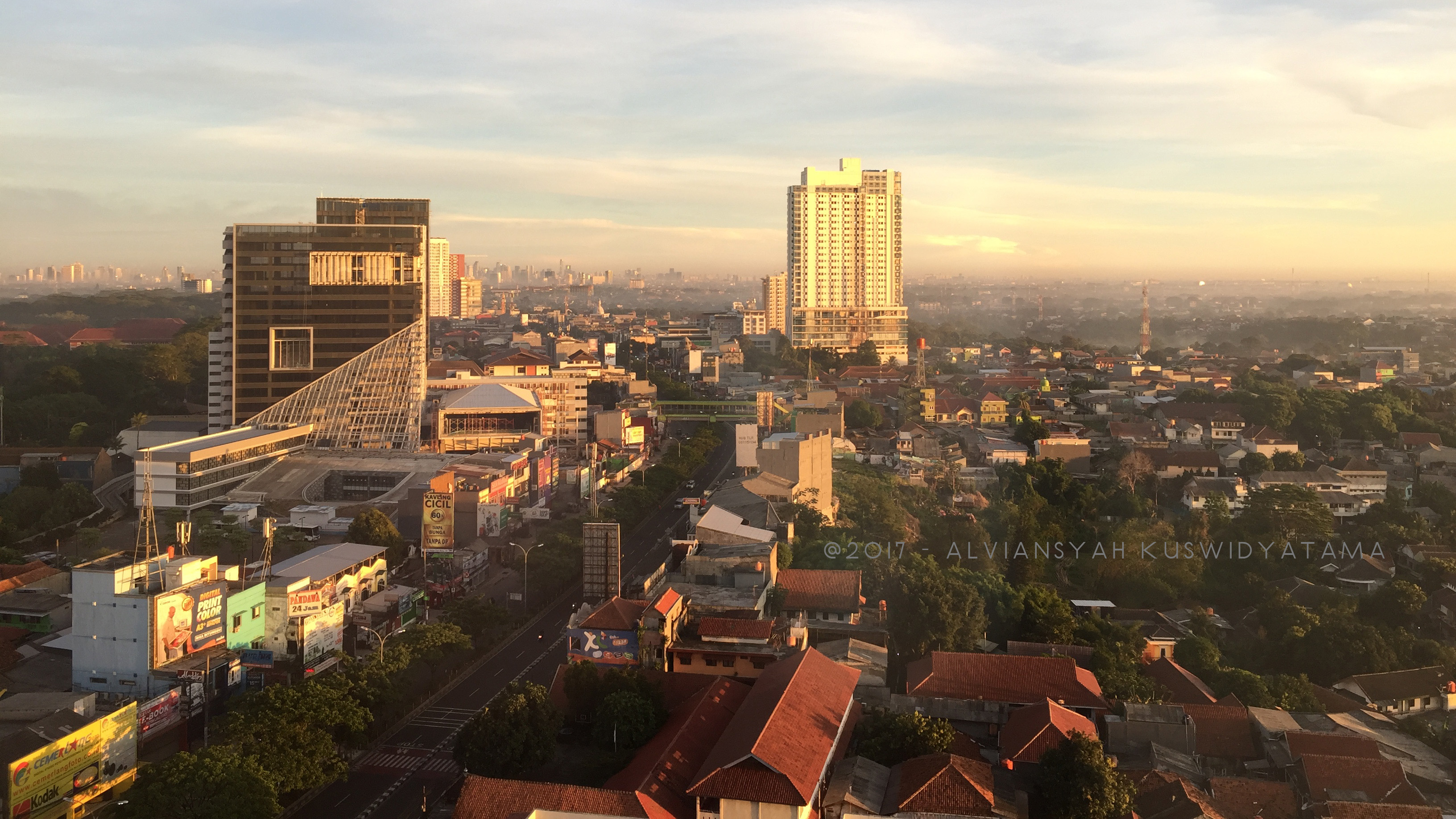
Depok

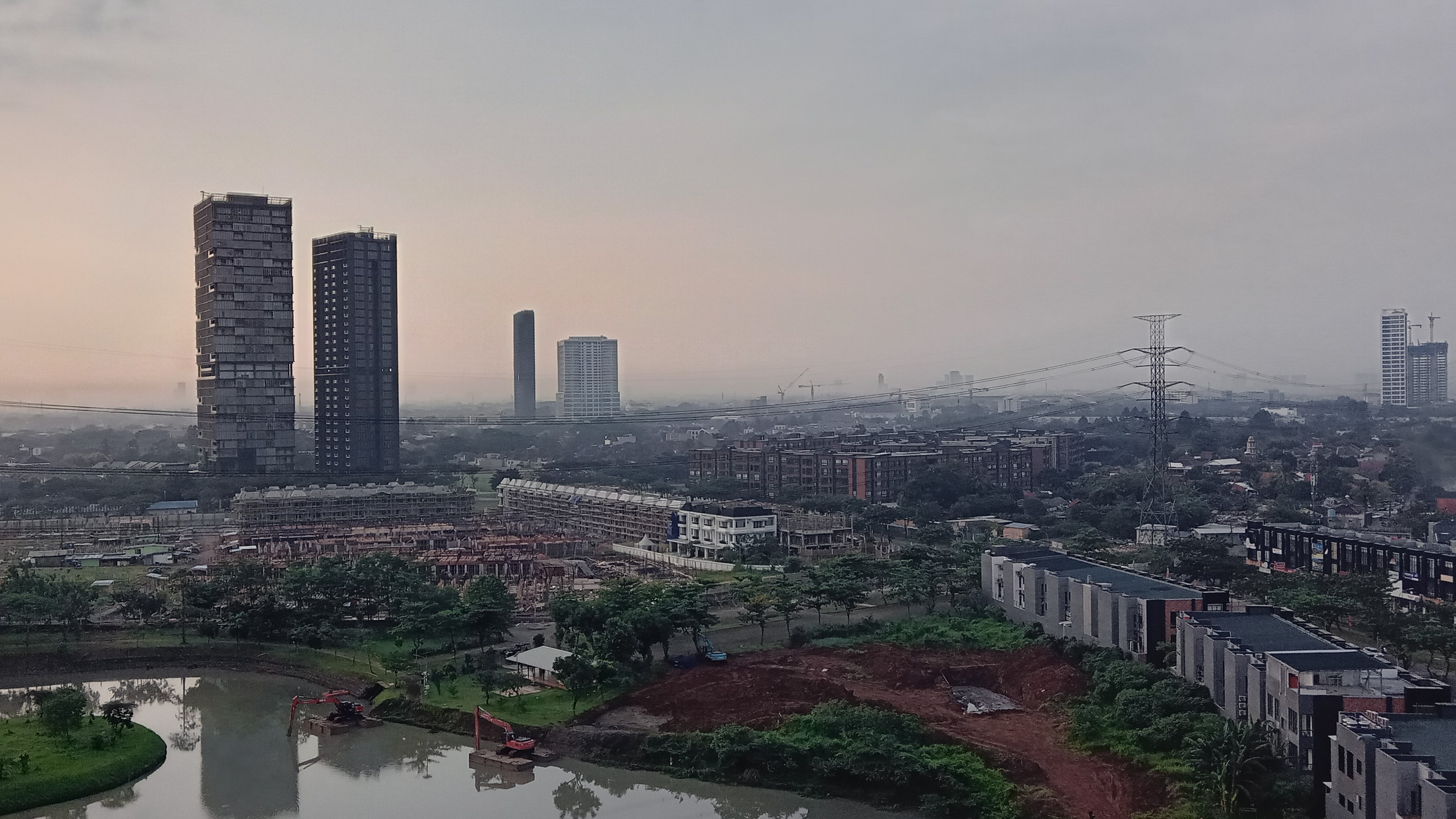
Tangerang

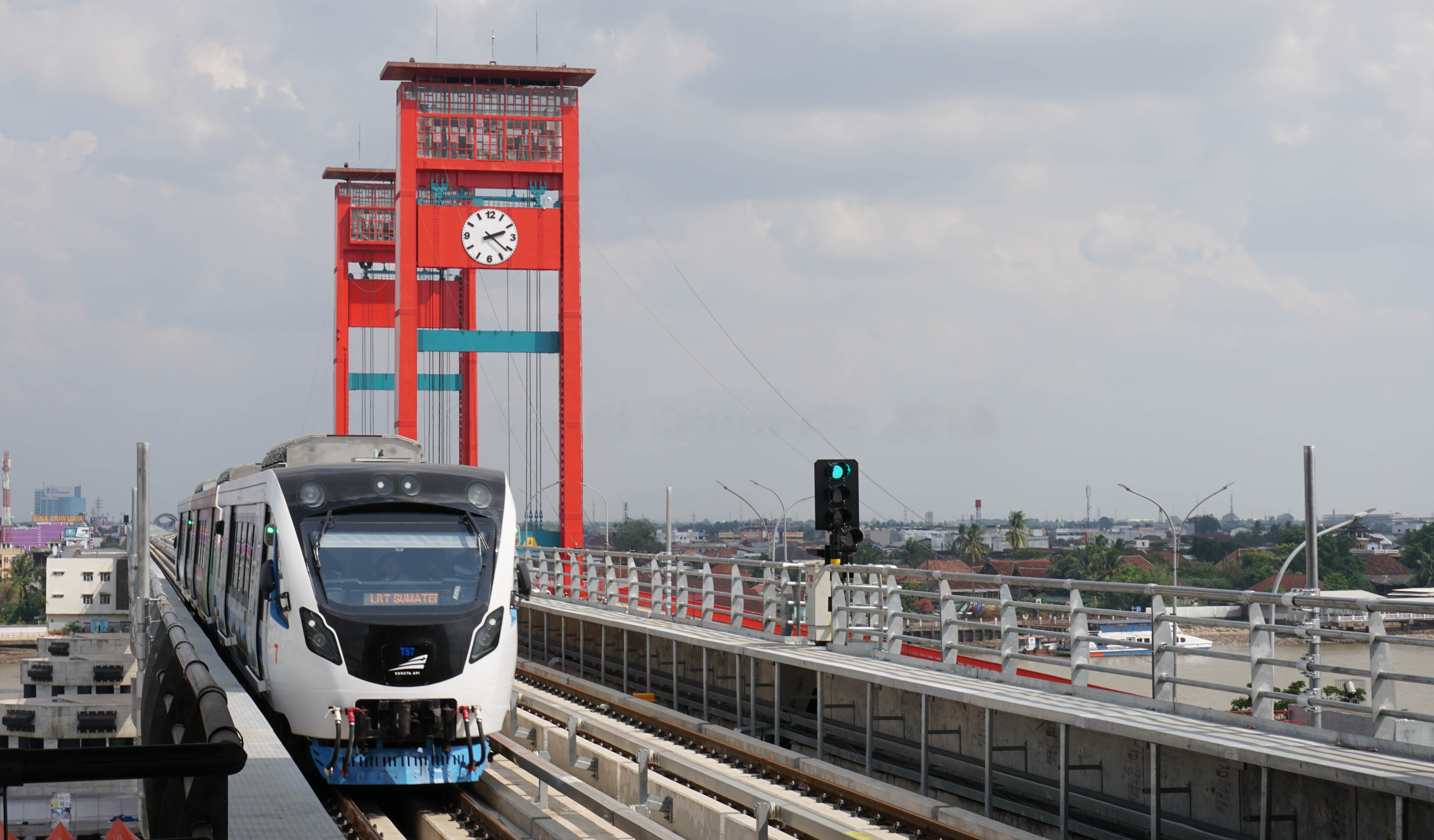
Palembang

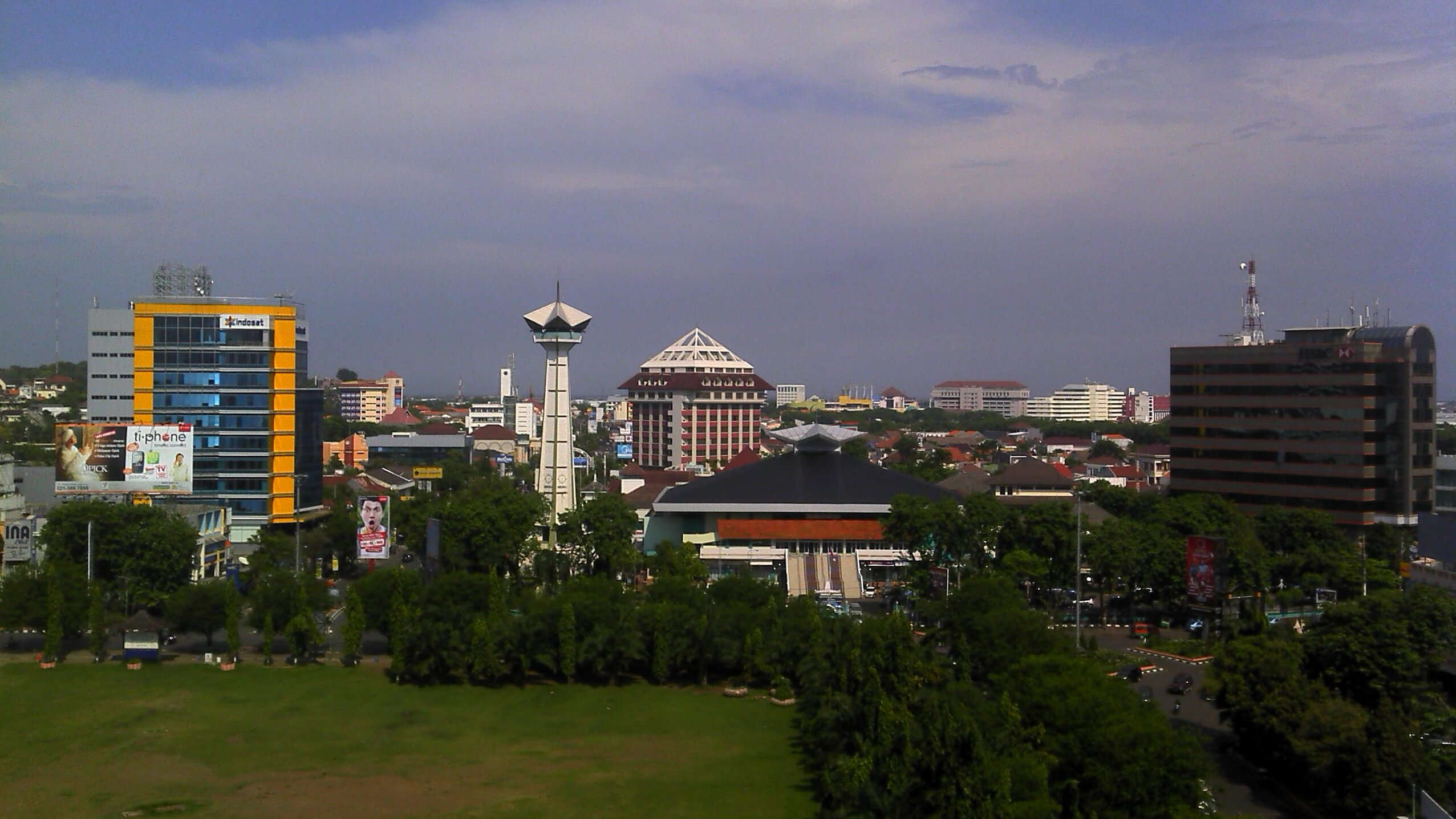
Semarang

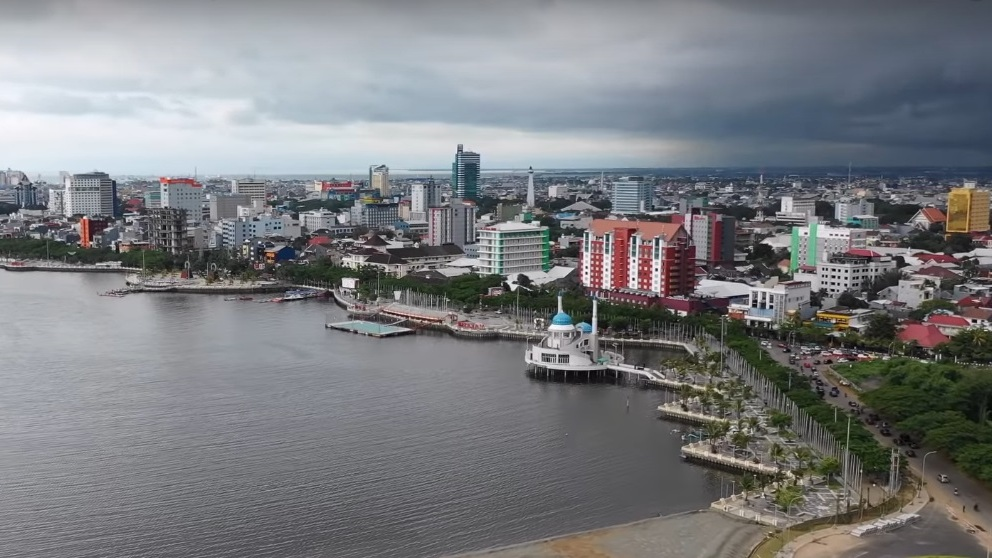
Makassar

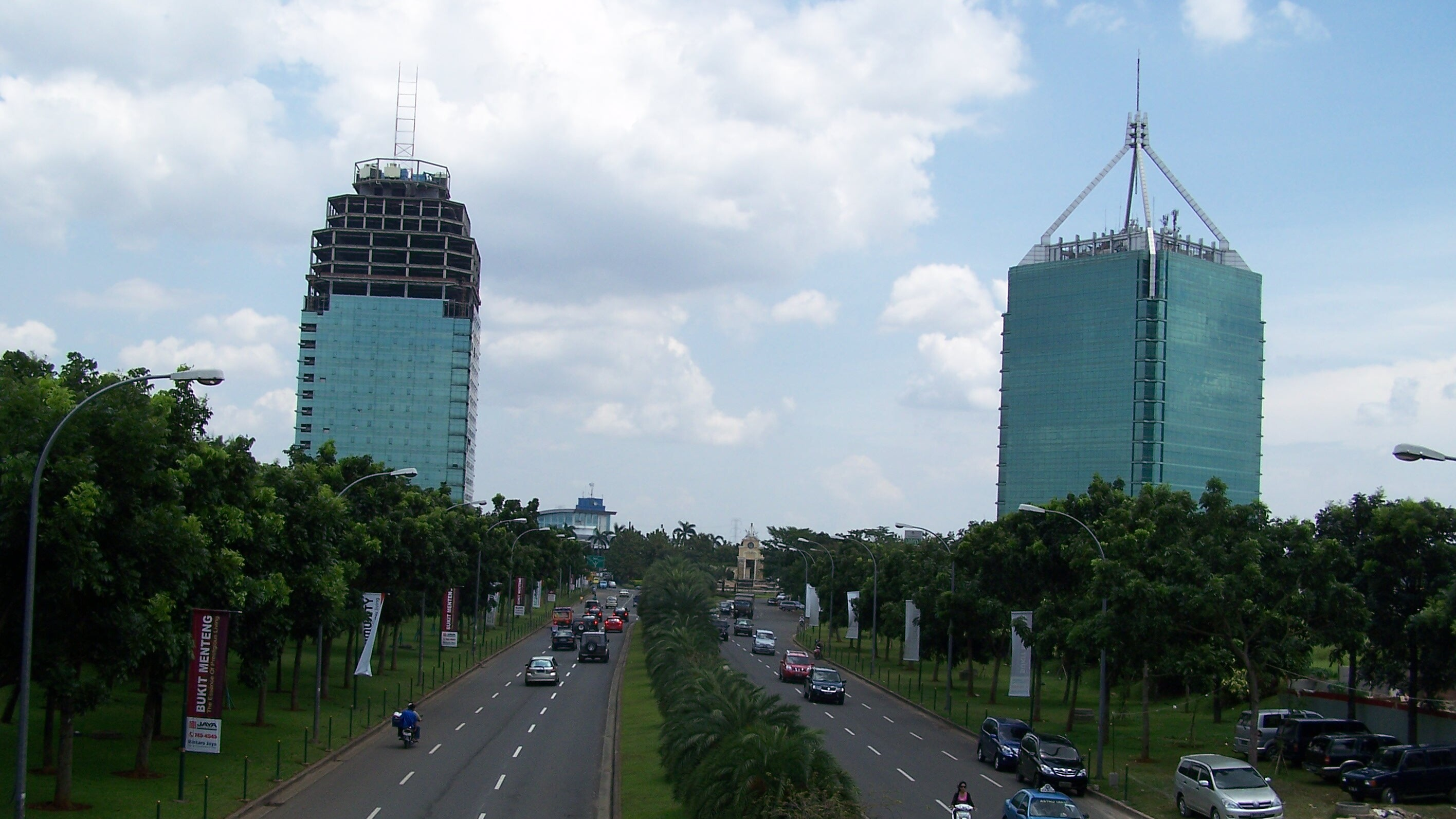
South Tangerang

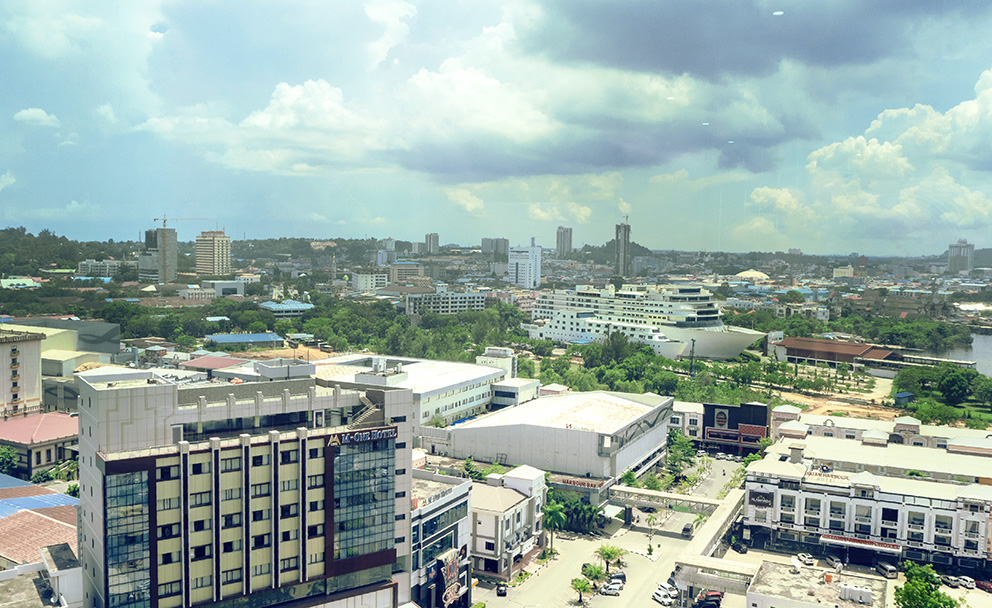
Batam

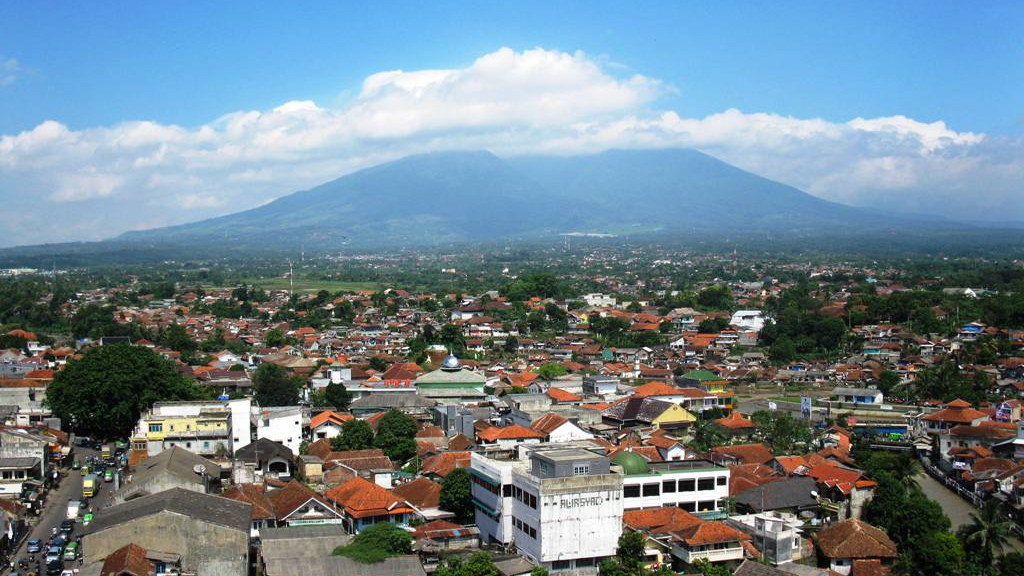
Bogor

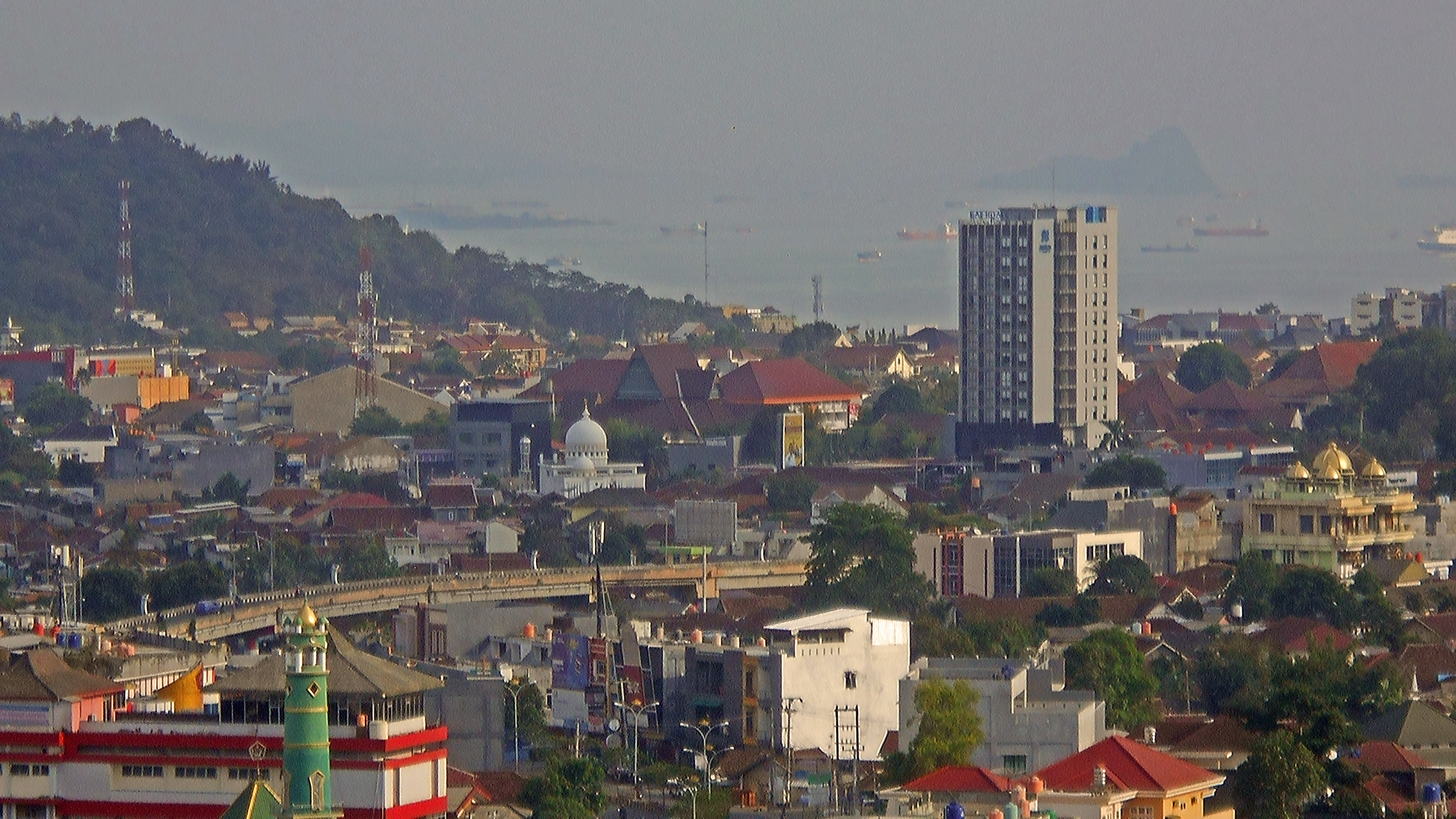
Bandar Lampung

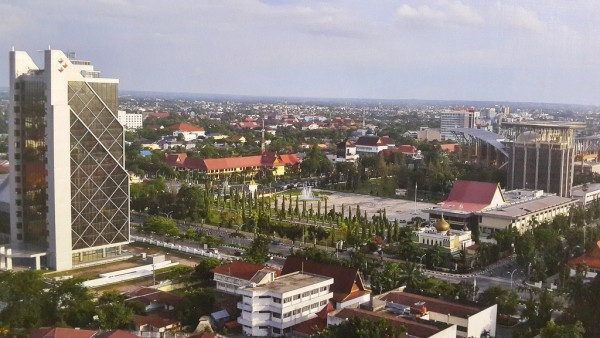
Pekanbaru

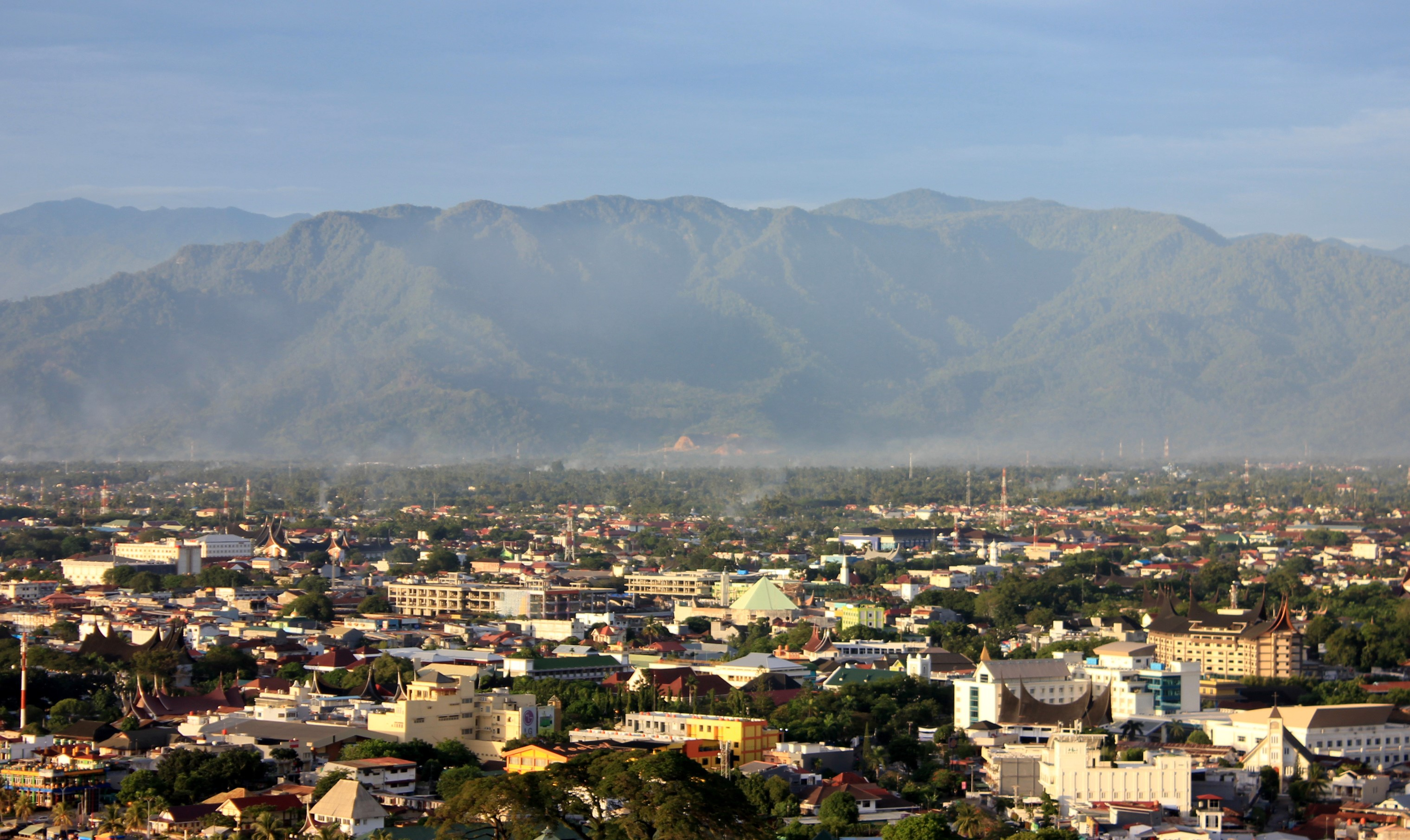
Padang

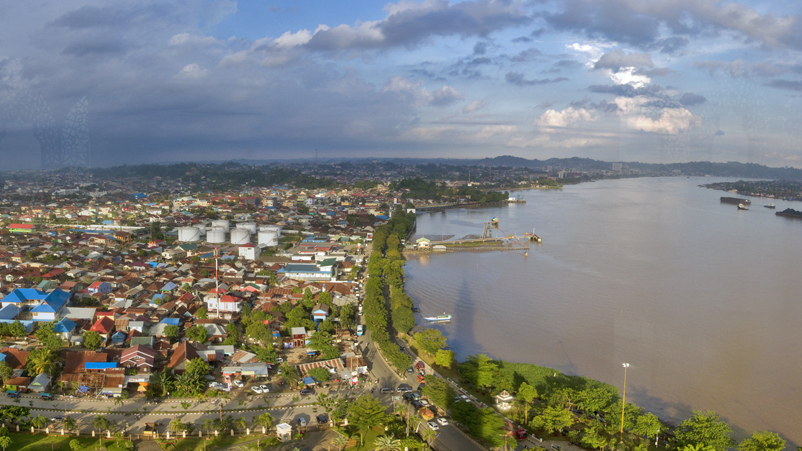
Samarinda

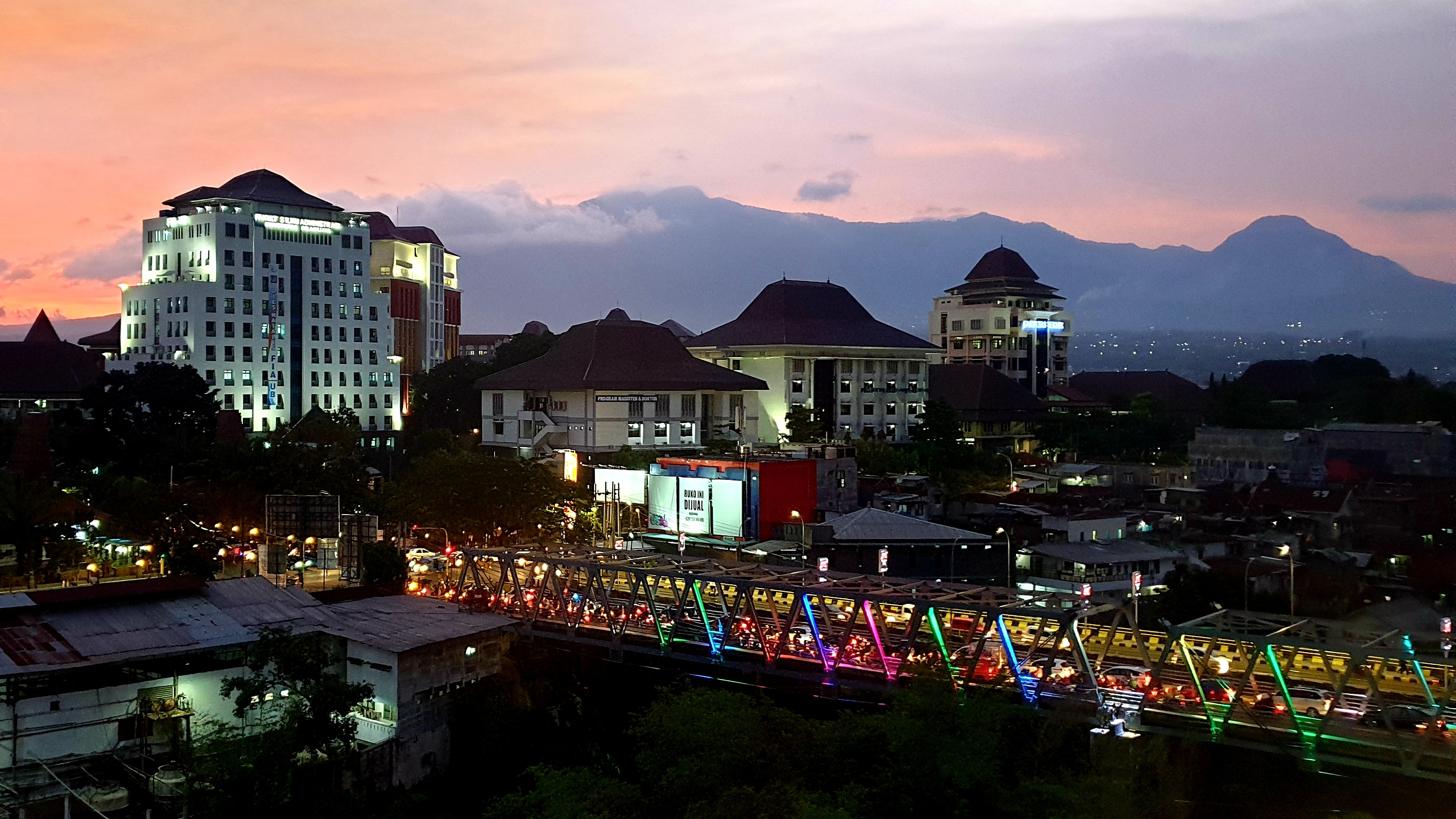
Malang

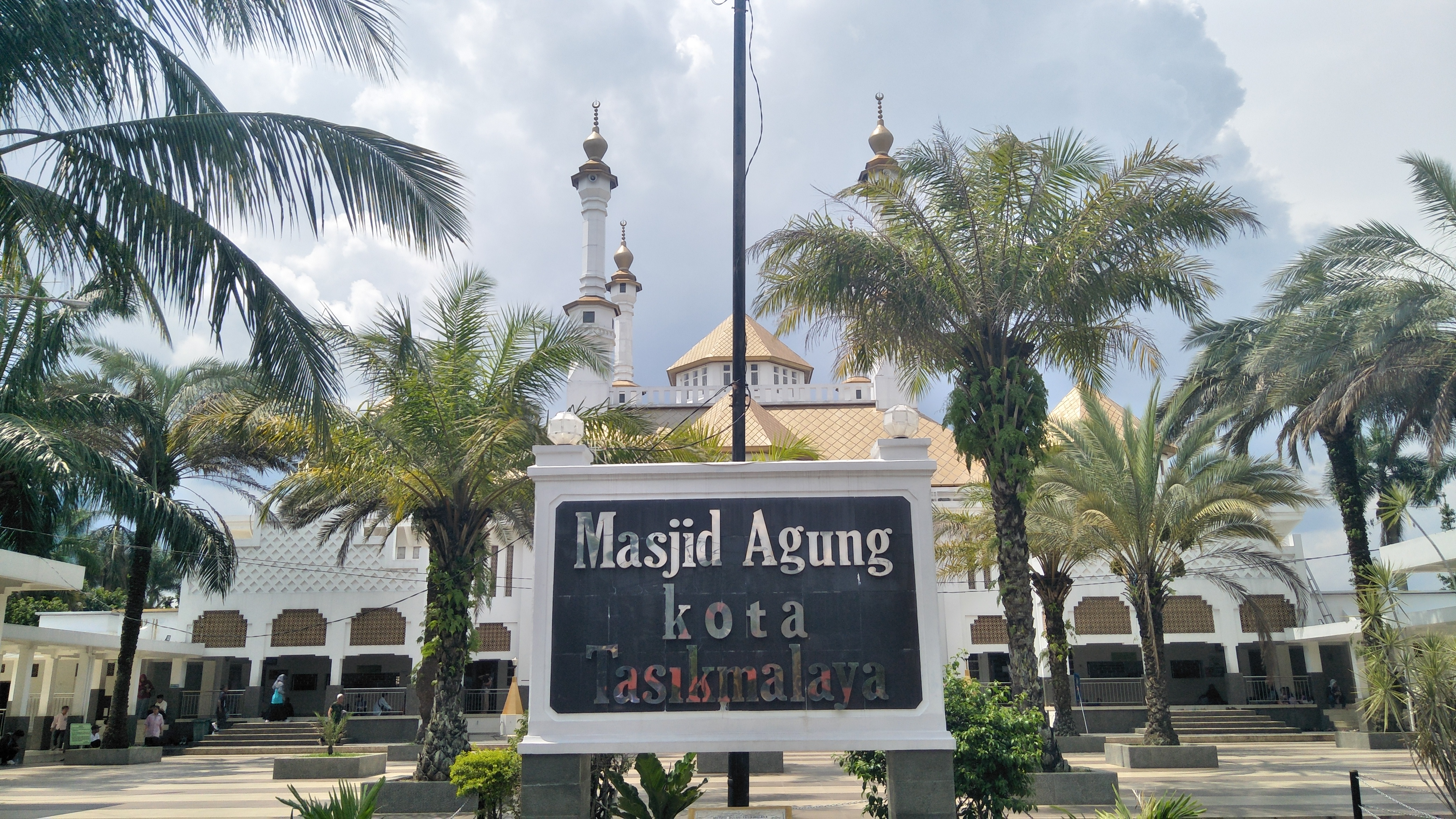
Tasikmalaya

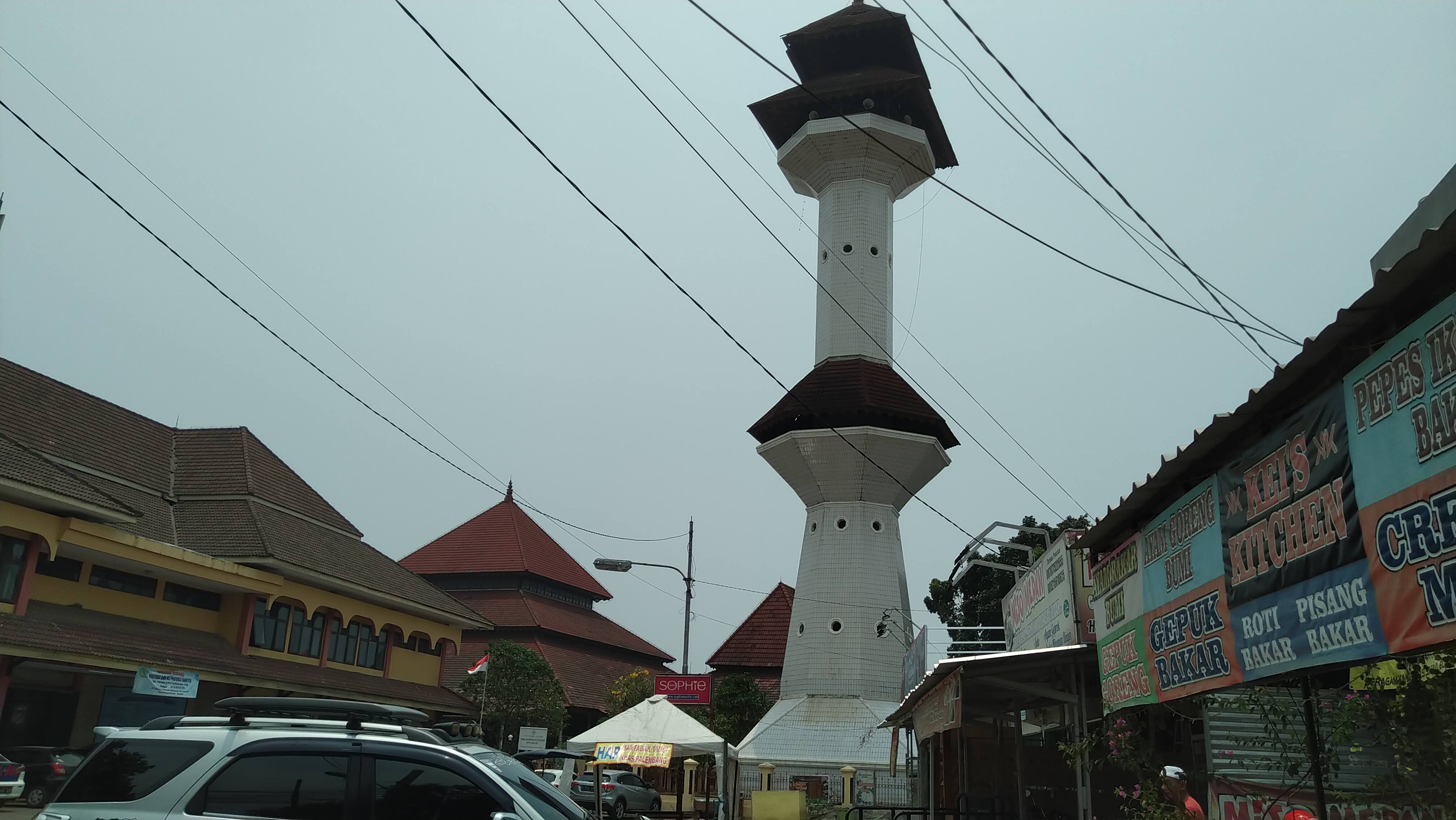
Serang

== See also ==
- List of metropolitan areas in Indonesia
