= Hasan Basri Bridge =

Indonesian bridge that crosses the Barito River

Coordinates: 0.9651°S 114.8847°E

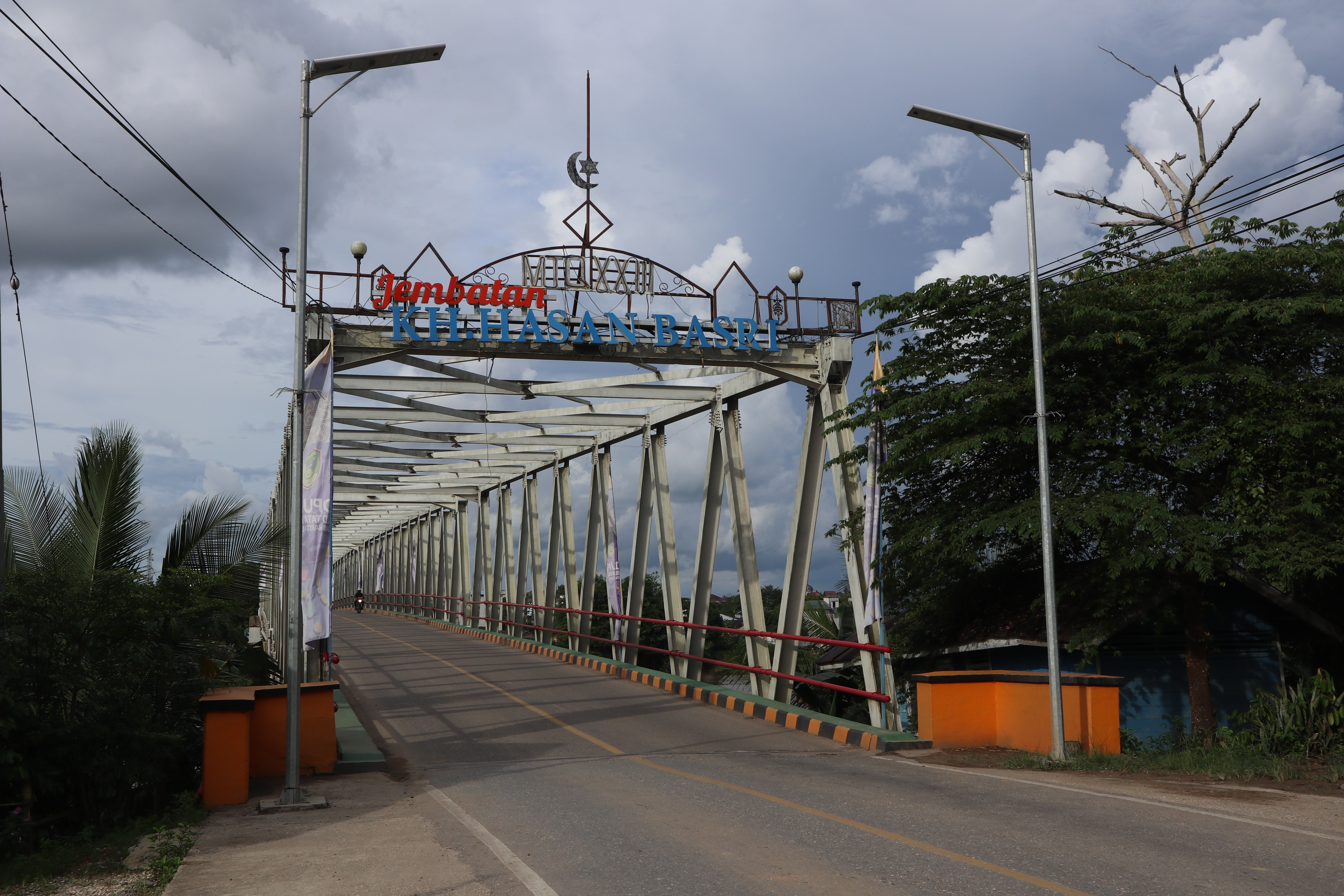
The bridge, as seen in 2021

The Hasan Basri Bridge is a bridge that crosses the Barito River located in Muara Teweh, Indonesia. The bridge is approximately 270 meters long and 5 meters wide and has an Australian-made steel frame. Construction on the bridge began in 1990. The name of the bridge is taken from a figure born in Muara Teweh, namely the former chairman of the central MUI, namely the K.H. Hasan Basri. The Hasan Basri Bridge is largely used to transport passengers and goods from the road that connects North Barito Regency and Murung Raya Regency and Banjarmasin. The bridge was inaugurated on February 19, 1995, by the Indonesian Minister of Information, Harmoko.

== See also ==
- List of bridges in Indonesia
