= 2000 Indonesian census =

2000 Population Census Sensus Penduduk 2000
← 1990	30 June 2000	2010 →

General information
- Country: Indonesia
- Authority: Statistics Indonesia

Results
- Total population: 206,264,595 (▲15.0%)
- Most populous province: West Java (35,729,537)
- Least populous province: North Maluku (785,059)

The 2000 Indonesian census was held on 30 June 2000, and recorded a population of 203 million people within the country. However, a revised figure of 206,264,595 people was the official result, and the population density of the census in 2000 was 108.3 inhabitants/km^{2}. In some provinces, estimates were made, like the notably then-secessionist Aceh, and the census was criticized internationally for significant underreporting. The 2000 census was the last Indonesian census held in the 20th century and the 2nd millennium, the following census held in 2010 was held in the 21st century and the 3rd millennium.

The census also recorded ethnicity. A total of 101 ethnic groups were identified officially, but the real number was estimated to be in the thousands.

== Province rankings ==
2000 Indonesian province Population Rankings
Rank	Province	Population
1	West Java	35,729,537
2	East Java	34,783,640
3	Central Java	31,228,940
4	North Sumatra	11,649,655
5	Jakarta	8,389,443
6	Banten	8,098,780
7	South Sulawesi	8,059,627
8	South Sumatera	6,899,675
9	Lampung	6,741,439
10	Riau	4,957,627
11	West Sumatra	4,248,931
12	West Kalimantan	4,034,198
13	West Nusa Tenggara	4,009,261
14	East Nusa Tenggara	3,952,279
15	Aceh	3,930,905
16	Bali	3,151,162
17	Special Region of Yogyakarta	3,122,268
18	South Kalimantan	2,985,240
19	East Kalimantan	2,455,120
20	Jambi	2,413,846
21	Papua	2,220,934
22	Central Sulawesi	2,218,435
23	North Sulawesi	2,012,098
24	Central Kalimantan	1,857,000
25	South East Sulawesi	1,821,284
26	Bengkulu	1,567,432
27	Maluku	1,205,539
28	Bangka Belitung	900,197
29	Gorontalo	835,044
30	North Maluku	785,059
--	Total	206,264,595
