= Al-Istiqlal Great Mosque, Murung Raya =

Mosque in Murung Raya, Central Kalimantan, Indonesia

Al-Istiqlal Great Mosque
- Masjid Agung Al-Istiqlal

- Location of Al-Istiqlal Great Mosque, Murung Raya in Central Kalimantan Al-Istiqlal Great Mosque, Murung Raya (Kalimantan)

Religion
- Affiliation: Islam
- Branch/tradition: Sunni

Location
- Location: Murung Raya Regency, Central Kalimantan, Indonesia
- Coordinates: 0°39′4.31″S 114°34′44.12″E

Architecture
- Type: Mosque
- Style: Mix of Arabic and local Dayak architecture
- Established: 2008

Specifications
- Capacity: 7.000 to 8.000 people
- Dome: 5
- Minaret: 4

Al-Istiqlal Great Mosque, Murung Raya is the largest mosque in the entire Murung Raya Regency, Central Kalimantan, Indonesia. This great mosque is located on Jendral Sudirman Street, in the district of Murung, Murung Raya Regency. This great mosque is one of the most popular icons of Murung Raya Regency.

== History ==
The construction of Al-Istiqlal Great Mosque was initiated by the ideas of Islamic scholars and honored figures in Murung Raya Regency. They aimed to build a large-scale mosque in which may host a large number of Muslims to pray and worship. Moreover, the great mosque was also intended to be the Islamic Center of Murung Raya Regency.

In 2007, the construction plan of this great mosque had begun. The basic concept of the construction plan was to build a great-scale mosque which could provide safety, harmony, calm, and peace within the Muslim community in Murung Raya. The construction process of Al-Istiqlal Great Mosque took exactly 4 years from 2008 until late 2012. The construction of this mosque was funded by the municipal budget of Murung Raya regency. Al-Istiqlal Great Mosque was inaugurated by the Murung Raya regent at that time, DR. Ir Willy. M. Yoseph, MM on 2 July 2013 and it is managed by the Management Board of Al-Istiqlal Great Mosque of Puruk Cahu.

== Architecture ==
The architecture style of this mosque is a mix between modern Arabic architecture and local Dayak architecture which could be seen from the color patterns of the great mosque domes. The building area of this great mosque is 5,929 m² (63,819 square ft). This great mosque can host more than 7,000 worshippers. The mosque has four minarets on its each sides and it also has five domes with the main domes is on the central part of the roof and the 4 others is above the four minarets.
