= Murung, Murung Raya =

Murung
- District
- Interactive map of Murung
- Coordinates: 0°39′03″S 114°34′10″E
- Country: Indonesia
- Province: Central Kalimantan
- Regency: Murung Raya

Area
  - Total: 730 km^{2} (280 sq mi)

Population (mid 2025)
  - Total: 45,156
  - Density: 62/km^{2} (160/sq mi)

Murung is an administrative district (kecamatan) in Murung Raya Regency, in the province of Central Kalimantan, Indonesia. It covers an area of 730 km^{2} and had a population of 39,600 at the 2020 Census, which grew to an official estimate of 45,156 as at mid 2025. The district is administered from the town of Puruk Cahu (which had 2,843 inhabitants in 2024), while the center of government of Murung Raya Regency is at the larger Beriwit (with 20,919 inhabitants in 2024), which is part of the same urban area.
