= 1990 Indonesian census =

1990 Population Census Sensus Penduduk 1990
- 31 October 1990
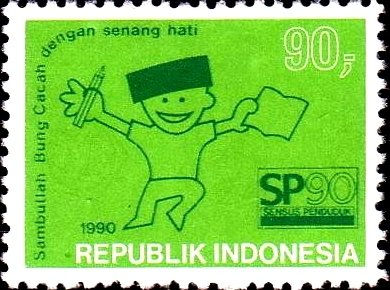
- Postage stamp commemorating the census

General information
- Country: Indonesia
- Authority: Central Bureau of Statistics

Results
- Total population: 179,378,946
- Most populous province: West Java
- Least populous province: East Timor

The 1990 Indonesian census was held on 31 October 1990, and recorded a population of 179 million people within the country. However, a revised figure of 179,378,946 people was the official result. Its population density during the 1990 census was 94.2 inhabitants/km^{2}. In some provinces, estimates were made, like the notably then-secessionist Aceh, and the census was criticized internationally for significant underreporting.

The census also recorded ethnicity. A total of 101 ethnic groups were identified officially, but the real number was estimated to be in the thousands.

== Province rankings ==
1990 Indonesian province Population Rankings
Rank	Province	Population
1	West Java	35,384,352
2	East Java	32,503,991
3	Central Java	28,520,643
4	North Sumatra	10,256,027
5	Jakarta	8,259,266
6	South Sulawesi	6,891,646
7	South Sumatra	6,313,074
8	Lampung	6,017,573
9	West Sumatra	4,000,207
10	Aceh	3,416,156
11	West Nusa Tenggara	3,369,649
12	Riau	3,303,976
13	East Nusa Tenggara	3,268,644
14	West Kalimantan	3.229,153
15	Special Region of Yogyakarta	2,913,054
16	Bali	2,777,811
17	South Kalimantan	2,597,572
18	North Sulawesi	2,478,119
19	Jambi	2,020,568
20	East Kalimantan	1,876,663
21	Maluku	1,857,790
22	Central Sulawesi	1,711,327
23	Irian Jaya	1,648,708
24	Central Kalimantan	1.396,486
25	South East Sulawesi	1,349,619
26	Bengkulu	1,179,122
27	East Timor	747,557
--	Total	179,378,946
