= Haji Muhammad Sidik Airport =

Haji Muhammad Sidik Airport Bandar Udara Haji Muhammad Sidik
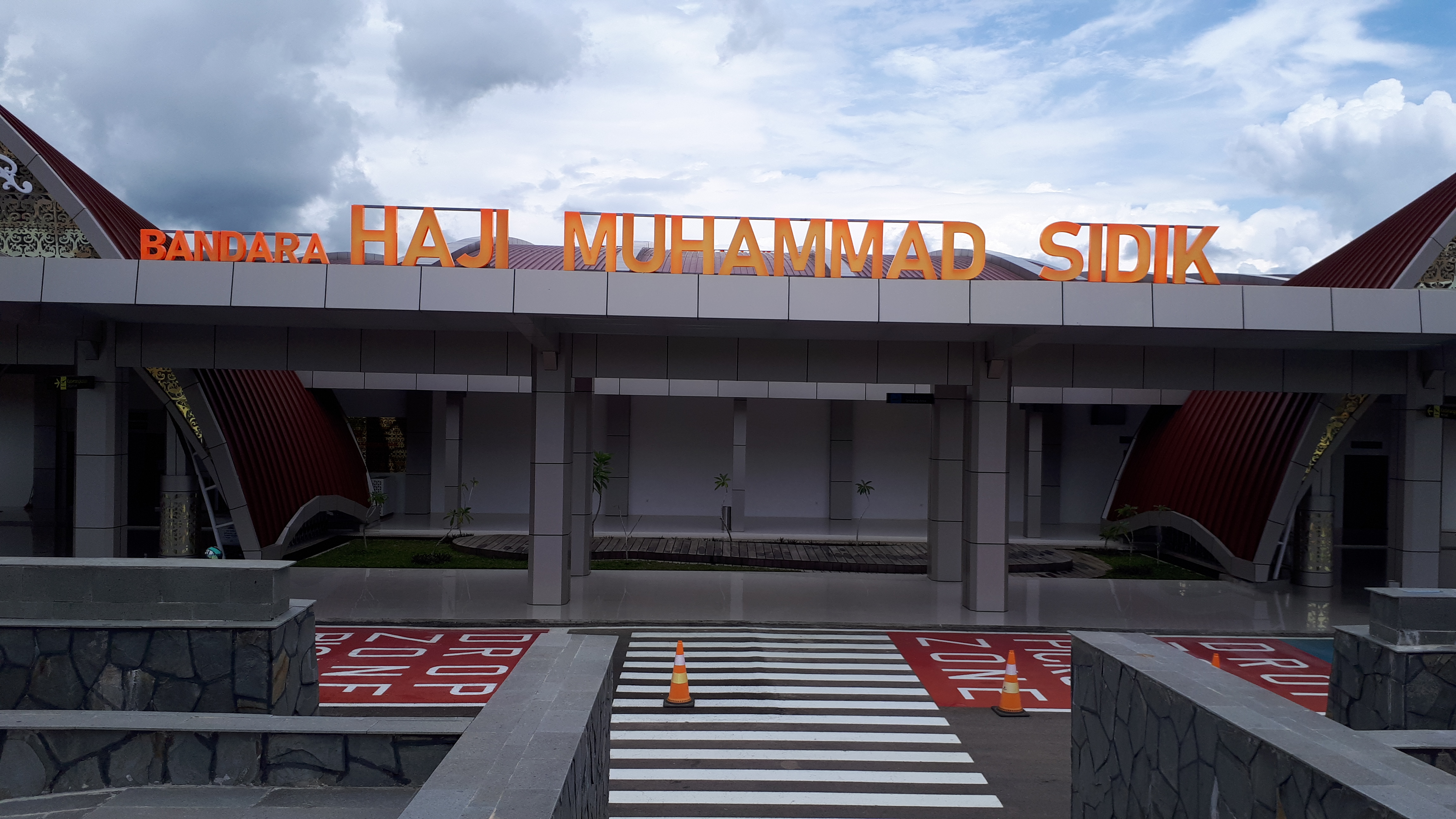
- IATA: HMS; ICAO: WAGB

Summary
- Airport type: Public
- Owner: Government of Indonesia
- Operator: Angkasa Pura II
- Serves: North Barito Regency
- Location: Trinsing, South Teweh, North Barito Regency, Central Kalimantan, Indonesia
- Time zone: WIB (UTC+07:00)
- Elevation AMSL: 82 ft (25 m)
- Coordinates: 01°1′29″S 114°55′40″E

Maps
- Kalimantan region in Indonesia

- Location in Kalimantan Location in Indonesia

Runways
Direction	Length		Surface
Direction	ft	m	Surface
14-32	4,593	1,400	Asphalt

Haji Muhammad Sidik Airport (IATA: HMS, ICAO: WAGB) is an airport located at Trinsing, South Teweh, North Barito Regency, Central Kalimantan, Indonesia. The airport was inaugurated by Vice President Ma'ruf Amin and Minister of Transportation Budi Karya Sumadi on 30 March 2021.

== Airlines and destinations ==
=== Passenger ===
Airlines	Destinations
Wings Air	Banjarmasin
