= North Barito Regency =

Regency in Central Kalimantan, Indonesia

North Barito Regency Kabupaten Barito Utara
- Regency
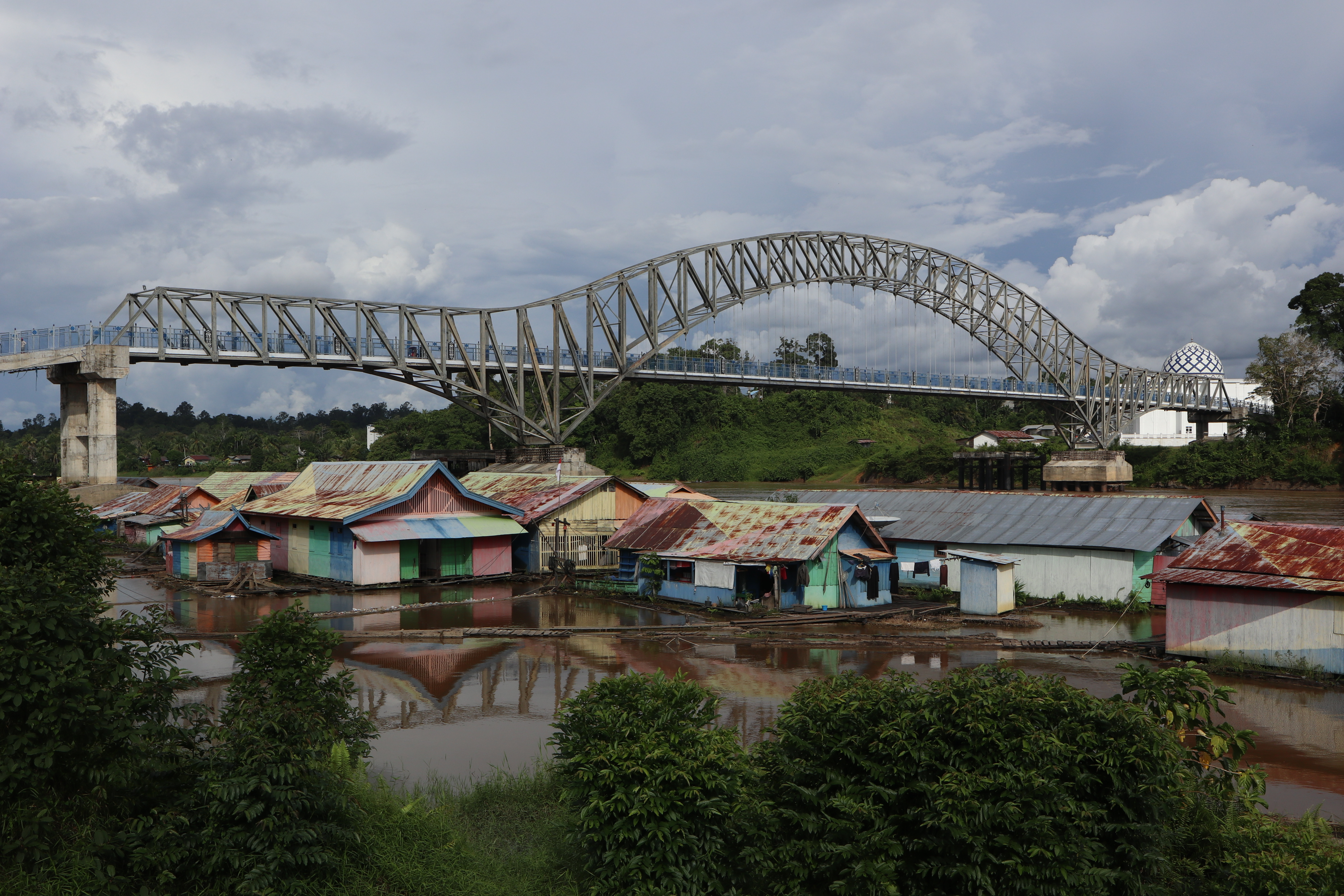
- Pangulu Iban Bridge in Muara Teweh town

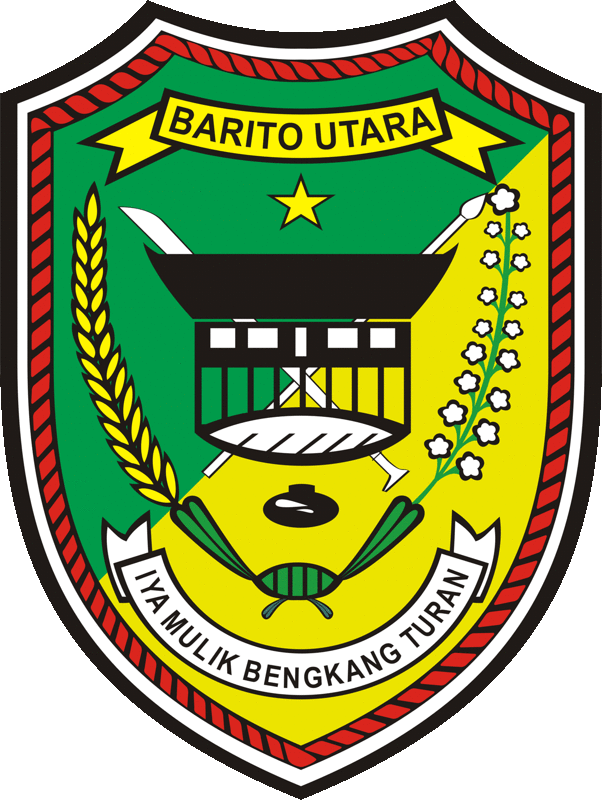
- Coat of arms
- Motto(s): "Iya Mulik Bengkang Turan"; Tawoyan language: "Never give up until [you have] succeeded"
- Location within Central Kalimantan

- Location in Kalimantan and Indonesia North Barito Regency (Indonesia)
- Coordinates: 0.9833°S 115.1000°E
- Country: Indonesia
- Region: Kalimantan
- Province: Central Kalimantan
- Capital: Muara Teweh

Government
  - Regent: Indra Gunawan (acting)
  - Vice Regent: Vacant

Area
  - Total: 10,152.25 km^{2} (3,919.81 sq mi)

Population (mid 2025 estimate)
  - Total: 164,621
  - Density: 16.2152/km^{2} (41.9972/sq mi)
- Time zone: UTC+7 (Western Indonesia Time)
- Area code: (+62) 519
- Website: baritoutarakab.go.id

North Barito Regency (Indonesian: Kabupaten Barito Utara) is one of the thirteen regencies which comprise the Central Kalimantan Province on the island of Kalimantan, Indonesia. It originally included much more of the northern part of the province, but on 10 April 2002 the larger northwestern part of the regency was split off to create a new Murung Raya Regency. Muara Teweh (in Teweh Tengah District) is the capital of the residual North Barito Regency, which covers a land area of 10,152.25 km^{2}. The population of North Barito Regency was 121,573 at the 2010 Census and 154,812 at the 2020 Census; the official estimate as at mid 2025 was 164,621 (comprising 85,120 males and 79,500 females).

== Administrative districts ==
At the 2010 Census, North Barito Regency consisted of six districts (kecamatan), but three additional districts were subsequently created by the splitting of existing districts. The first three districts named are in the southern 31.5% of the regency, the next four (the 'Teweh' districts) are in the more populated middle 33%, and the last two (the 'Lahei' districts) form the more mountainous northern 35%. All nine are tabulated below with their areas and population totals from the 2010 Census and the 2020 Census; together with the official estimates as at mid 2025. The table also includes the locations of the district administrative centres, the number of administrative villages in each district (a total of 93 rural desa and 10 urban kelurahan), and its postal codes.

Kode Wilayah	Name of District (kecamatan)	Area in km^{2}	Pop'n Census 2010	Pop'n Census 2020	Pop'n Estimate mid 2025	Admin centre	No. of villages	Post codes
62.05.01	Montallat	694.63	10,604	12,146	12,356	Tumpung Laung II	10 ^{(a)}	73861
62.05.02	Gunung Timang	1,066.31	10,029	12,490	13,231	Kandui	16	73862
62.05.03	Gunung Purei	1,435.80	2,426	2,755	2,827	Lampeong	11	73871
62.05.04	Teweh Timur (East Teweh)	921.58	7,221	6,440	6,609	Benangin I	12	73881
62.05.05	Teweh Tengah (Central Teweh)	1,144.40	69,941	58,308	63,617	Muara Teweh	10 ^{(b)}	73814 ^{(c)}
62.05.07	Teweh Baru	808.70	^{(d)}	22,096	23,839	Hajak	10 ^{(e)}	73814 ^{(f)}
62.05.08	Teweh Selatan (South Teweh)	481.17	^{(d)}	15,269	15,965	Trahean	12	73814
62.05.06	Lahei	3,219.39	21,352	13,857	14,273	Lahei II	13 ^{(g)}	73852
62.05.09	Lahei Barat (West Lahei)	340.26	^{(h)}	11,451	11,904	Benao Hulu	11	73853
	Totals	10,152.25	121,573	154,812	164,621	Muara Teweh	103	

Note: (a) comprising four kelurahan (Montallat I, Montallat II, Tumpung Laung I and Tumpung Laung II) and six desa.
(b) including two kelurahan - Lanjas and Melayu. The two form a single urban area of 46,559 inhabitants in the extreme east of Teweh Tengah District.
(c) except the kelurahan of Melayu (with a post code of 73811 and 25,219 inhabitants in 2024) and the kelurahan of Lanjas (with a post code of 73812 and 21,340 inhabitants in 2024).
(d) the 2010 populations of the new Teweh Baru and Teweh Selatan Districts are included in the figure for Teweh Tengah District, from which they were split off (Teweh Baru District also acquired three villages from Teweh Timur District).
(e) including two kelurahan - Jambu and Jingah. (f) except the kelurahan of Jambu (with a post code of 73813) and the villages of Gandring, Liangbuah and Panaen (with a post code of 73881).
(g) including two kelurahan - Lahei I and Lahei II. (h) the 2010 population of the new Lahei Barat District is included in the figure for Lahai District, from which it was split off.

== Demographics ==
Religion as of the Indonesia 2010 census:

- Muslim 71.3%
- Protestant 11.6%
- Roman Catholic 5.0%
- Hindu 0.1%
- Buddhist 0.0%
- Confucian 0.0%
- Other 11.8%
- Not stated or not asked 0.2%

== Airports ==
A new airport was built at Muara Teweh for a predicted initial operation in 2013. The airport covers 180 hectares area and will has 2,250 metres length and 30 metres width of runway to accommodate wide body aircraft. The new airport was built to replace Beringin Airport which cannot be expanded. Haji Muhammad Sidik Airport (IATA: HMS, ICAO: WAGB) is an airport located at Trinsing, South Teweh, North Barito Regency. The airport was inaugurated by Vice President Ma'ruf Amin and Minister of Transportation Budi Karya Sumadi on 30 March 2021.
