= Beringin Airport =

Former airport in Central Kalimantan, Indonesia

Beringin Airport Bandar Udara Beringin
- IATA: ~~GXA~~; ICAO: ~~WAGK~~

Summary
- Airport type: Defunct
- Operator: North Barito Government
- Serves: Muara Teweh, North Barito Regency, Central Kalimantan, Indonesia
- Elevation AMSL: 38 m / 125 ft
- Coordinates: 00°56′34″S 114°53′40″E

Map
- Location of airport in Kalimantan (Borneo)

Runways
Direction	Length		Surface
Direction	m	ft	Surface
13/31	904	2,966	Asphalt

Beringin Airport ~~(IATA: MTW, ICAO: WAOM)~~ (Indonesian: Bandar Udara Beringin) was an airport in Muara Teweh, the capital city of the North Barito Regency in Central Kalimantan, Indonesia. The airport was closed at 10 September 2020.
