= 2020 Indonesian census =

2020 Population Census Sensus Penduduk 2020
← 2010	30 September 2020	2030 →

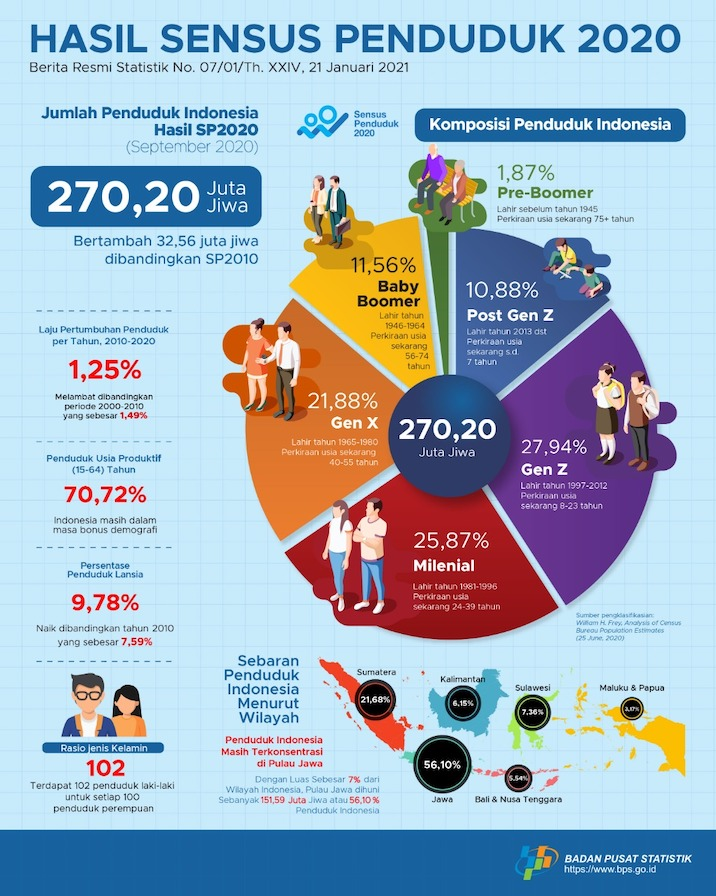
- 2020 Indonesian population census infographic

General information
- Country: Indonesia
- Authority: Statistics Indonesia

Results
- Total population: 270,203,917 (▲13.7%)
- Most populous province: West Java (48,274,162)
- Least populous province: North Kalimantan (701,814)

The 2020 Indonesian census was the 7th census in Indonesia. It was held in September 2020 by Statistics Indonesia. The resident Indonesia population was projected to be 269.6 million, a 13.4% increase from the 2010 census.

== Introduction ==
As required by the Indonesian Constitution and recommendation of United Nations, Indonesian census has been conducted since 1961, and from 1980, the census has been held every 10 years, when the year ends in "0". The 2020 census was the 7th census in Indonesia.

== Technology ==
It is planned that the 7th census will be carried out using digital equipment, no longer relying on paper. Head of BPS, Kecuk Suhariyanto said that the digital equipment in question included smartphone and web applications. The hope is that the equipment will help field enumerators who collect data, also make it easier for citizens who want to enter their own data.

In addition to smartphone applications, it is also developing web applications. The difference is, this application is intended directly to residents, so they can fill their own data without going through a field enumerator.

== Projection ==
The Statistics Indonesia in 2018 has released the official projection of Indonesia's population 2015–2045, which are based on previous census in 2010 and the 2015 Indonesian population survey between censuses (SUPAS). The projection was calculated using component method and also take into consideration births, deaths, and net migration.

In 2020, the population of Indonesia is projected to be 269,603,400 and the dependency ratio will be reach on 45.40, the lowest dependency ratio in Indonesian history.

== Result ==
=== Total population ===
On 21 January 2021, Statistics Indonesia released the result of the 2020 census. It found the total population of Indonesia to be 270,203,917 people, compared to the population in the year 2010 of 237,641,326 people. This is an increase of 32,562,591 people (13.70% in 10 years or an average of 1.25% per year).

=== Sex ratio ===
As the result of 2020 census, there are 136,661,899 males and 133,542,018 females in Indonesia. It found the sex ratio for Indonesia is 102.34, which means that for every 100 females, there are 102-103 males. The largest sex ratio is in Papua with 114 males for every 100 females, and the smallest sex ratio is in Yogyakarta, with 98 males for every 100 females.

=== Age Structure ===
0–14 years = ▼23.33%

15–64 years = ▲70.72%

65+ years = ▲5.95%

=== Population distribution ===
Population by regions
Islands	Percentage of population (2010 census)	Percentage of population (2020 census)
Sumatra	21.31	21.68
Java	57.49	56.10
Kalimantan	5.80	6.15
Sulawesi	7.31	7.36
Lesser Sunda Islands	5.50	5.54
Maluku and Papua	2.60	3.17

Population by province
Province	2010 census	2020 census	Change
Aceh	4,494,410	5,274,871	▲780,461
North Sumatra	12,982,204	14,799,361	▲1,817,157
West Sumatra	4,846,909	5,534,472	▲687,563
Riau	5,538,367	6,394,087	▲855,720
Jambi	3,092,265	3,548,228	▲455,963
South Sumatra	7,450,394	8,467,432	▲1,017,038
Bengkulu	1,715,518	2,010,670	▲295,152
Lampung	7,608,405	9,007,848	▲1,399,443
Bangka Belitung	1,223,296	1,455,678	▲232,382
Riau Islands	1,679,163	2,064,564	▲385,401
Jakarta	9,607,787	10,562,088	▲954,301
West Java	43,053,732	48,274,162	▲5,220,430
Central Java	32,382,657	36,516,035	▲4,133,378
Special Region of Yogyakarta	3,457,491	3,668,719	▲211,228
East Java	37,476,757	40,665,696	▲3,188,939
Banten	10,632,166	11,904,562	▲1,272,396
Bali	3,890,757	4,317,404	▲426,647
West Nusa Tenggara	4,500,212	5,320,092	▲819,880
East Nusa Tenggara	4,683,827	5,325,566	▲641,739
West Kalimantan	4,395,983	5,414,390	▲1,018,407
Central Kalimantan	2,212,089	2,669,969	▲457,880
South Kalimantan	3,626,616	4,073,584	▲446,968
East Kalimantan	3,553,143	3,766,039	▲212,896
North Kalimantan	Previously part of East Kalimantan (split-off in 2012)	701,814	Steady
North Sulawesi	2,270,596	2,621,923	▲351,327
Central Sulawesi	2,635,009	2,985,734	▲350,725
South Sulawesi	8,034,776	9,073,509	▲1,038,733
Southeast Sulawesi	2,232,586	2,624,875	▲392,289
Gorontalo	1,040,164	1,171,681	▲131,517
West Sulawesi	1,158,651	1,419,229	▲260,578
Maluku	1,533,506	1,848,923	▲315,417
North Maluku	1,038,087	1,282,937	▲244,850
West Papua	760,422	1,134,068	▲373,646
Papua	2,833,381	4,303,707	▲1,470,326
Indonesia	237,641,326	270,203,917	▲32,562,561

== Impact of COVID-19 ==
Indonesia prepared to extend the online time for self-enumeration, and cancel all field data collection. They relied on administrative data and had requested additional UNFPA technical support for using administrative data for census.
