= Puruk Cahu =

Puruk Cahu Puruk Cahu
- Regency seat
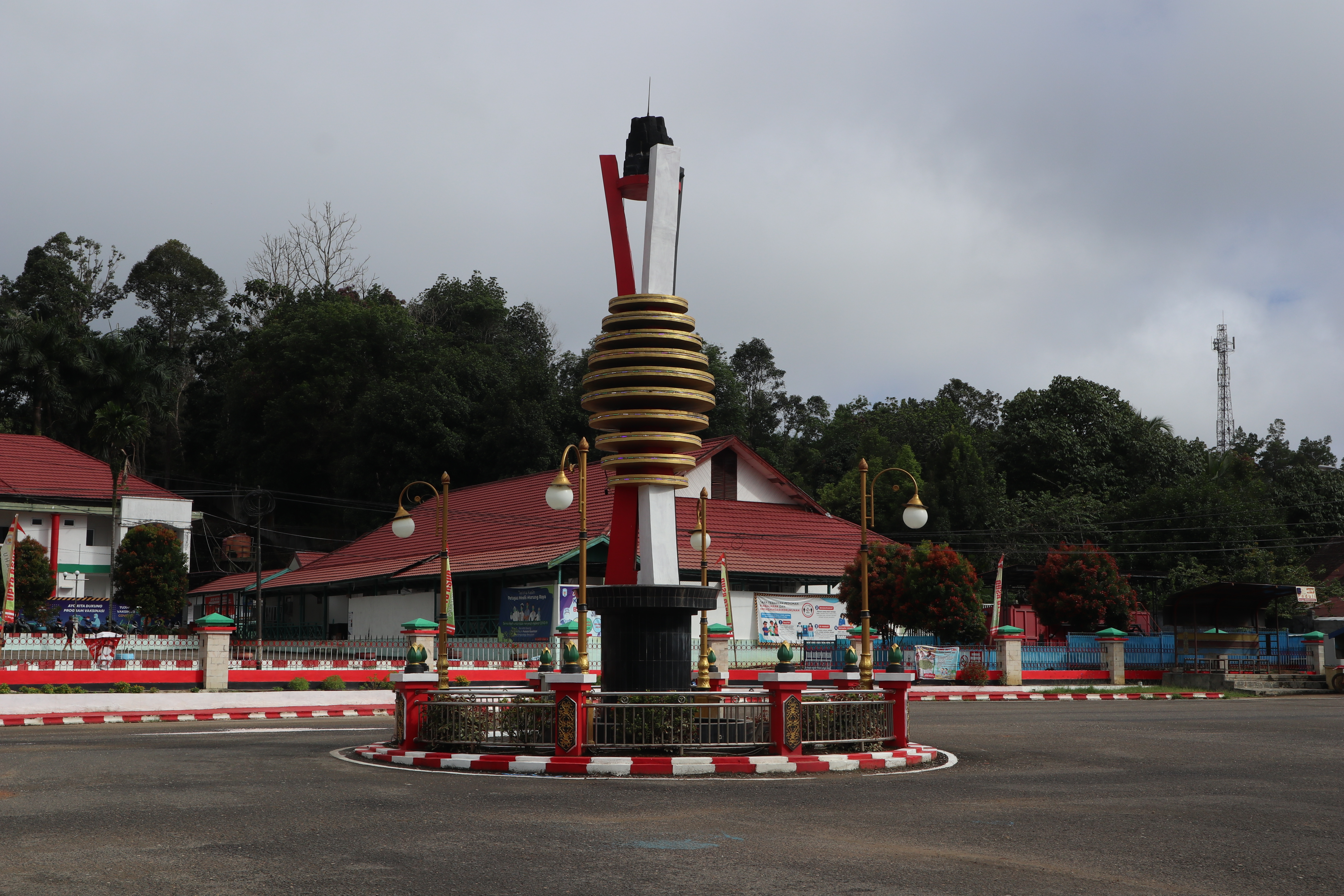
- Batu Bara (Coal) Roundabout Monument in Puruk Cahu
- Motto: "Tira Tangka Balang"; Siang language: "Work to Completion"
- Location in Central Kalimantan, Indonesia Puruk Cahu (Indonesia)
- Coordinates: 0°38′18″S 114°34′04″E
- Country: Indonesia
- Province: Central Kalimantan
- Regency: Murung Raya Regency
- District: Murung

Area
  - Total: 151 km^{2} (58 sq mi)
- Elevation: 74 m (243 ft)

Population (2024)
  - Total: 23,762
  - Density: 157.4/km^{2} (408/sq mi)
- Time zone: UTC+7 (Western Indonesian Time)
- Postal code: 73911
- Area code: +6282311922203

Puruk Cahu (abbreviated: PRC) is the regency seat of Murung Raya Regency and also one of the towns in Central Kalimantan. This town is at a distance of 322 km northeast of Palangka Raya city, the capital of Central Kalimantan Province. The area of this town mainly includes two kelurahan (urban villages) in the district of Murung i.e. the kelurahan of Beriwit and the kelurahan of Puruk Cahu itself. The population of Puruk Cahu was 2,843 in 2024, while the larger Beriwit had 20,919 inhabitants in 2024.

== Geography ==
Puruk Cahu, Central Kalimantan

Climate chart (precipitation, max. and min. temperature)
J	F	M	A	M	J	J	A	S	O	N	D
301 31 23	283 31 23	324 31 23	323 31 23	255 31 23	196 31 23	152 31 23	124 31 23	134 32 23	217 32 23	332 31 23	332 31 23
- █ Average max. and min. temperatures in °C
- █ Precipitation totals in mm
- Source: Climate-Data.org & BMKG
Imperial conversion
J	F	M	A	M	J	J	A	S	O	N	D
12 87 73	11 87 73	13 87 73	13 87 74	10 87 74	7.7 87 73	6 87 73	4.9 88 73	5.3 90 74	8.5 89 74	13 87 74	13 87 74
- █ Average max. and min. temperatures in °F
- █ Precipitation totals in inches

To be precise, the town of Puruk Cahu is located at 0.6384 degrees south and 114.5677 degrees east. Puruk Cahu is located in the northern to northeastern part of Central Kalimantan and approximately at a distance of 319 km from Palangka Raya city, the capital of Central Kalimantan. Puruk Cahu is also the most northern town and regency seat in the whole Central Kalimantan province. The total area of Puruk Cahu town is about 151 km^{2} which makes it 0.64% of the total area of Murung Raya Regency which is the largest regency in Central Kalimantan. The whole area of this town consists of two kelurahan in Murung district, i.e. the kelurahan of Beriwit and the kelurahan of Puruk Cahu itself.

Puruk Cahu is crossed by one of the most important rivers in Borneo, Barito River. This town is situated on a hilly land at the northeastern portion of Central Kalimantan. The altitude of this town is actually varied between 70 and 300 metres above sea level. Due to its proximity to the equator, Puruk Cahu experiences tropical equatorial climate (Af) with constant high humidity and warm-to-hot temperature, and also huge amounts of rainfall all year long.

== Demographics ==
As of 2021, the population of Puruk Cahu town was about 21,781 inhabitants which represented 54.3% of the population of Murung District and 19.5% of the entire population of Murung Raya Regency. The population density of this town was approximately 144.2/km^{2}. This town had 6,648 households and the average household size was 3.27 people. The sex ratio of this town was 103 which means there were 103 males to every 100 females. The majority of the town's population identify as Muslims (78.7%) and the minority identify as Christians (20.8%), Hindu/Kaharingan (0.45%), and Buddhists (0.05%).

== Education ==
Puruk Cahu has currently thirteen primary schools (nine public schools and four private schools), seven middle schools (four public schools and three private schools), and five high schools (three public schools and two public schools) as of 2021.

== Facilities ==
For healthcare facility, Puruk Cahu currently has one general hospital, two public health centres, and four pharmacies. For economic & trade facility, this town recently has three markets, five banks, three shopping complexes, five convenience shops, twenty restaurants, nine food stalls/cafes, six hotels, and eight inns. For religious facility, Puruk Cahu has 37 Islamic religious facilities, seventeen Protestant churches, and one Catholic church.
