= Muara Teweh =

Muara Teweh Muara Teweh
- Regency seat
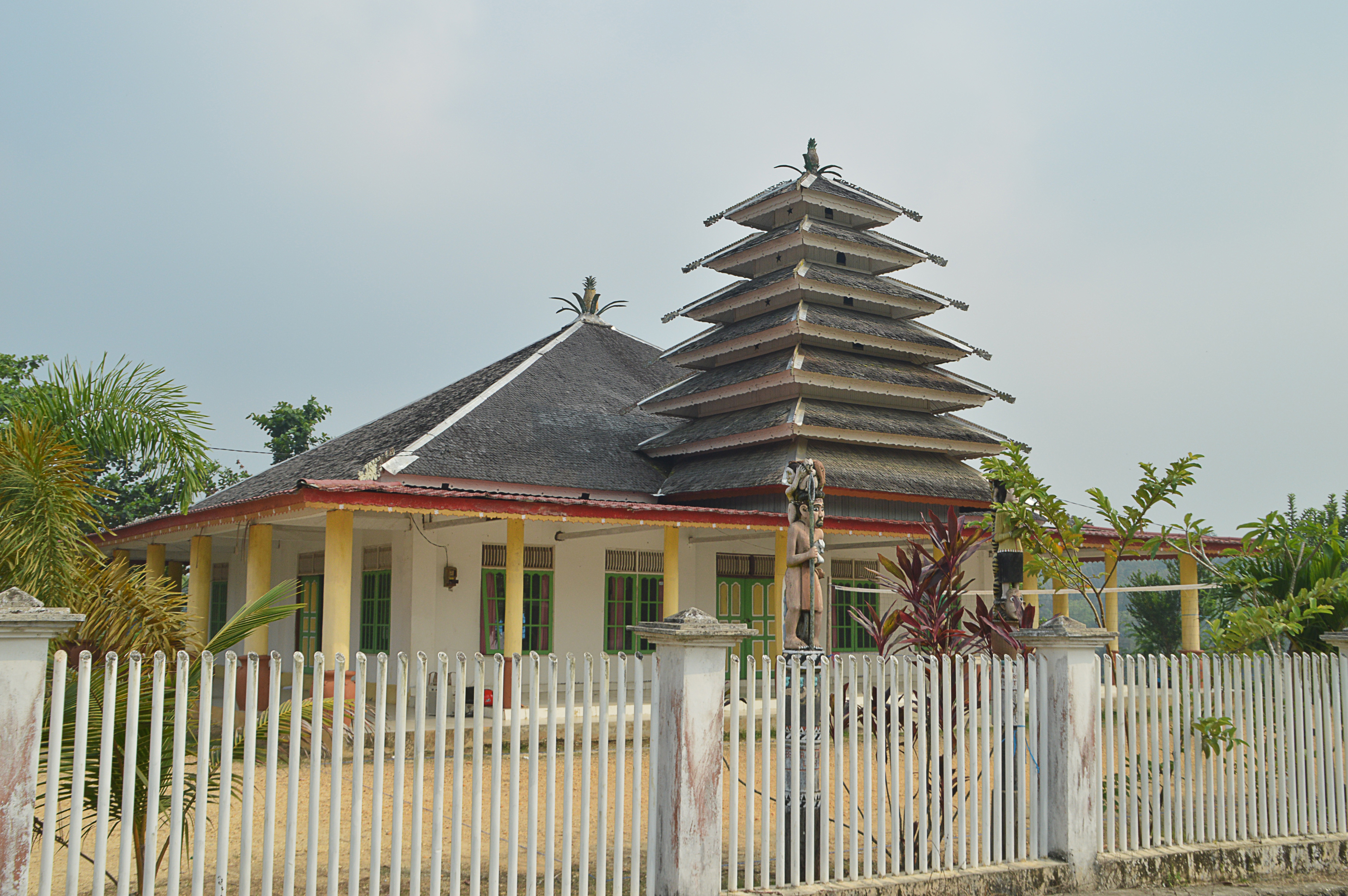
- A Kaharingan temple in Muara Teweh

- Location in Central Kalimantan, Indonesia Muara Teweh (Indonesia)
- Coordinates: 0°57′13″S 114°53′53″E
- Country: Indonesia
- Province: Central Kalimantan
- Regency: North Barito Regency
- District: Teweh Tengah

Area
  - Total: 36.87 km^{2} (14.24 sq mi)
- Elevation: 30 m (98 ft)

Population (2021)
  - Total: 46,559
  - Density: 422/km^{2} (1,090/sq mi)
- Time zone: UTC+7 (Western Indonesian Time)
- Postal code: 73811
- Area code: +62513

Muara Teweh (abbreviated: MTW, or simply known as Teweh) is the regency seat of North Barito Regency and also one of the towns in Central Kalimantan. This town is at a distance of 350 km northeast of Palangka Raya city, the capital of Central Kalimantan Province. This town comprises two administrative kelurahan, the kelurahans or Lanjas and Melayu, both located in the extreme east of Central Teweh (Teweh Tengah) District. The population of this town was 46,559 people as of 2024.

== Geography and climate ==
Muara Teweh is located at 0.95348 degrees south latitude and 114.89807 degrees east longitude. It is northeast of Palangka Raya, the capital of Central Kalimantan, about 353 km away. The town's area is 36.87 km^{2}, 0.36% of the area of North Barito Regency. Muara Teweh is crossed by the Barito River and situated on the flatlands of northeastern Central Kalimantan within the Barito River basin area, 35 metres above sea level.

Like other towns in Central Kalimantan, because of its proximity to the equator, Muara Teweh has a tropical rainforest climate (Af) with heavy rainfall almost all year round, constant humidity and warm-to-hot temperature above 21 °C.

Climate data for Muara Teweh (Beringin Airport) (1991–2020 normals)
Month	Jan	Feb	Mar	Apr	May	Jun	Jul	Aug	Sep	Oct	Nov	Dec	Year
Record high °C (°F)	35.8 (96.4)	36.0 (96.8)	35.6 (96.1)	35.4 (95.7)	35.6 (96.1)	35.5 (95.9)	35.2 (95.4)	36.4 (97.5)	36.8 (98.2)	36.4 (97.5)	36.7 (98.1)	36.0 (96.8)	36.8 (98.2)
Mean daily maximum °C (°F)	31.8 (89.2)	32.1 (89.8)	32.2 (90.0)	32.3 (90.1)	32.7 (90.9)	32.4 (90.3)	32.1 (89.8)	32.5 (90.5)	32.6 (90.7)	32.7 (90.9)	32.5 (90.5)	32.1 (89.8)	32.3 (90.1)
Daily mean °C (°F)	26.9 (80.4)	27.0 (80.6)	27.1 (80.8)	27.2 (81.0)	27.4 (81.3)	27.2 (81.0)	26.9 (80.4)	27.0 (80.6)	27.2 (81.0)	27.3 (81.1)	27.2 (81.0)	27.0 (80.6)	27.1 (80.8)
Mean daily minimum °C (°F)	23.3 (73.9)	23.3 (73.9)	23.4 (74.1)	23.6 (74.5)	23.7 (74.7)	23.4 (74.1)	23.0 (73.4)	22.8 (73.0)	23.1 (73.6)	23.4 (74.1)	23.4 (74.1)	23.4 (74.1)	23.3 (73.9)
Record low °C (°F)	18.1 (64.6)	20.5 (68.9)	21.0 (69.8)	21.0 (69.8)	20.7 (69.3)	19.2 (66.6)	18.6 (65.5)	17.8 (64.0)	18.3 (64.9)	20.1 (68.2)	20.2 (68.4)	19.8 (67.6)	17.8 (64.0)
Average precipitation mm (inches)	270.2 (10.64)	268.8 (10.58)	324.7 (12.78)	304.1 (11.97)	254.6 (10.02)	171.0 (6.73)	138.0 (5.43)	129.3 (5.09)	129.4 (5.09)	216.9 (8.54)	316.6 (12.46)	324.2 (12.76)	2,847.8 (112.12)
Average precipitation days (≥ 1.0 mm)	17.6	15.6	18.1	17.8	15.4	12.1	10.6	10.0	9.6	13.6	18.3	19.8	178.5
Mean monthly sunshine hours	129.6	130.7	145.9	154.6	165.6	145.6	153.4	158.5	143.6	142.3	144.4	131.8	1,746
Source: World Meteorological Organization

== Demographics ==
As of 2021, the total population of Muara Teweh was about 46,652, which represented 79.42% of the population of Teweh Tengah district and 29.7% of the population of North Barito Regency. The population density was approximately 422 people/km^{2}. This town had 14,655 households and the average household size was 3.18 persons. There were 102 males to every 100 females.

== Education ==
As of 2021, Muara Teweh had 24 primary schools (19 public schools and five private schools), eight middle schools (five public schools and three private schools), three high schools (all public schools), two public vocational schools, one economic college, one polytechnic college, and one Islamic college.

== Facilities ==
For healthcare facility, Muara Teweh had one general hospital, three polyclinics, two public health centres, and fifteen pharmacies. For economic & trade facility, this town recently has ten shopping complexes, seven markets, ten minimarkets, 712 convenience stores, fifty restaurants, 158 food stalls/cafes, six hotels, and nineteen inns. For religious facility, Muara Teweh had 76 Islamic religious facilities, eleven Protestant churches, and two Catholic churches, one Kaharingan temple, and one Buddhist temple. This town is also served by the Beringin Airport located within Melayu kelurahan.
