= Statistics Indonesia =

Indonesian statistical organization

- Badan Pusat Statistik

Agency overview
- Formed: 1960
- Preceding agencies: Centraal Kantoor voor de Statistiek; 庶務部調査室軍政幹部, Shomubu Chosasitsu Gunseikanbu; Biro Pusat Statistik
- Jurisdiction: Government of Indonesia
- Headquarters: Jl. Dr. Sutomo 6-8 Jakarta 10710, Indonesia
- Agency executives: Amalia Adininggar Widyasanti, chief; Sonny Harry Budiutomo Harmadi, chief deputy
- Website: www.bps.go.id

Statistics Indonesia (Indonesian: Badan Pusat Statistik, BPS, lit. 'Central Agency of Statistics'), is a non-ministerial government institute of Indonesia that is responsible for conducting statistical surveys. Its main customer is the government, but statistical data is also available to the public. Annual surveys cover areas including national and provincial socio-economics, manufacturing establishments, population and the labour force.

Established in 1960 as the Central Bureau of Statistics (Biro Pusat Statistik), the institute is directly responsible to the president of Indonesia. Its functions include providing data to other governmental institutes as well as to the public and conducting statistical surveys to publish periodic statistics on the economy, social change and development. Statistics Indonesia also assists data processing divisions in other public offices to support and to promote standard statistical methods.

== History ==
In February 1920, the Director of Agriculture and Trade (Directeur van Landbouw Nijverheid en Handel) of the government of the Dutch East Indies, established the Statistical Office based in Bogor. In March 1923, the Commission for Statistics was formed to represent members of each department. It was tasked with planning actions to ensure the achievement of unity in statistical activities in Indonesia. On 24 September 1924, the name of the institution was changed to Central Statistics Office (Centraal Kantoor voor de Statistiek, CKS) and the institution was moved to Jakarta. In June 1942, the Government of Japan reactivated statistical activities focused on meeting the needs of war or military. CKS was renamed General Affairs Department Research Office, Military Government (Japanese: 庶務部調査室軍政監部, romanized: Shomubu Chosasitsu Gunseikanbu) during Japanese military occupation. On 26 September 1960 the government of Indonesia enacted Law No. 7 of 1960 on Statistics replacing Statistiek Ordonantie 1934. Law Number 16 of 1997 concerning Statistics replaced previous laws, and based on it, the Central Bureau on Statistics became the Central Statistics Agency.

== Census ==
Based on Republic of Indonesia Laws No. 6 of 1960 on the Census, Statistics Indonesia organizes a census every 10 years

=== Demography ===
A demographic census has been organized every year ending in "0" after 1961 namely in 1970, 1980, 1990, 2000, 2010 and 2020.

=== Economy ===
An economic census is held every year ending in "6", namely 1986, 1996, 2006, and 2016.

=== Agriculture ===
An agricultural census is held every year ending in "3", namely 1963, 1973, 1983, 1993, 2003, 2013, and 2023.

== See also ==
- List of national and international statistical services
