= Murung Raya Regency =

Regency in Central Kalimantan, Indonesia

Murung Raya Regency Kabupaten Murung Raya
- Regency
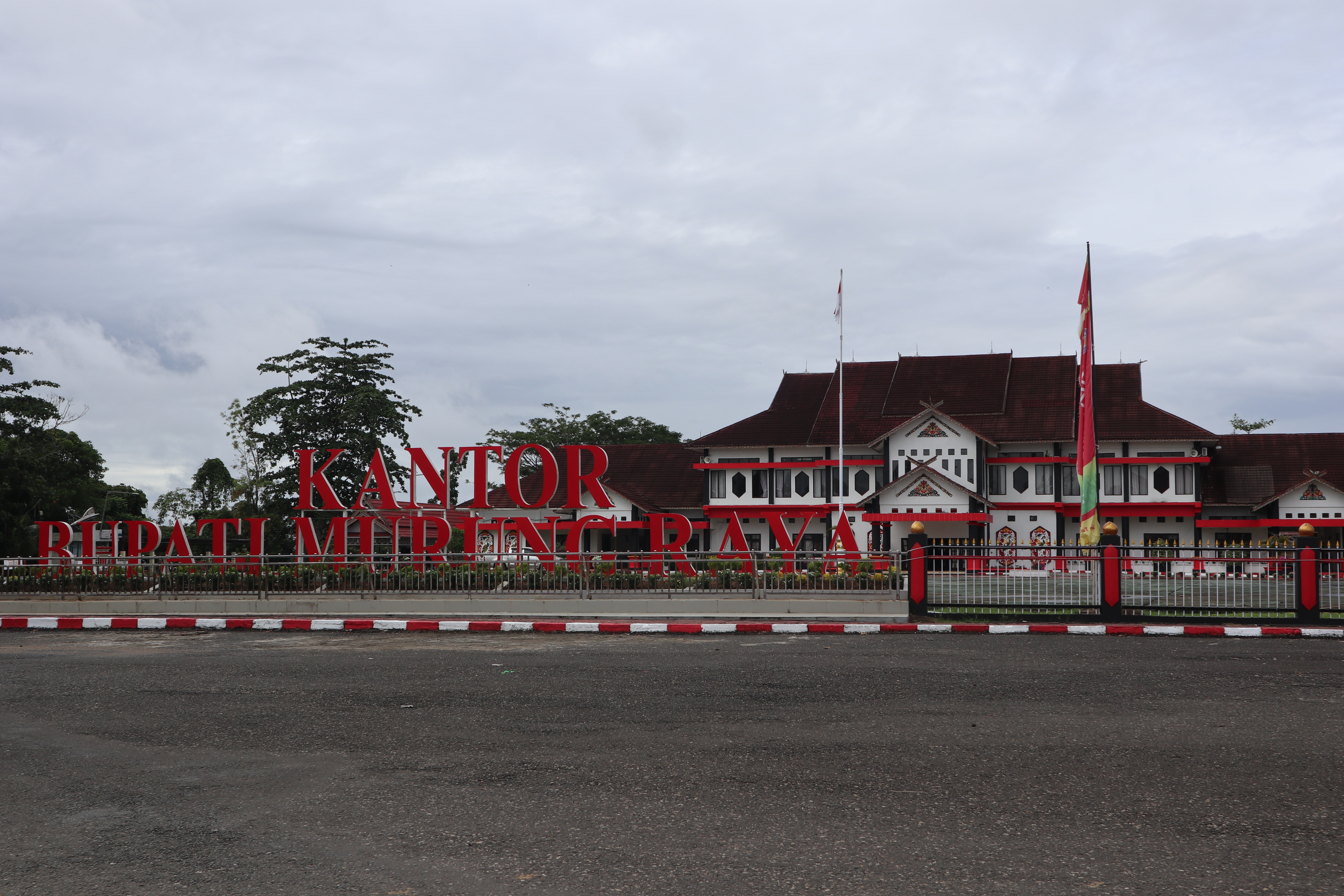
- Regent office of Murung Raya

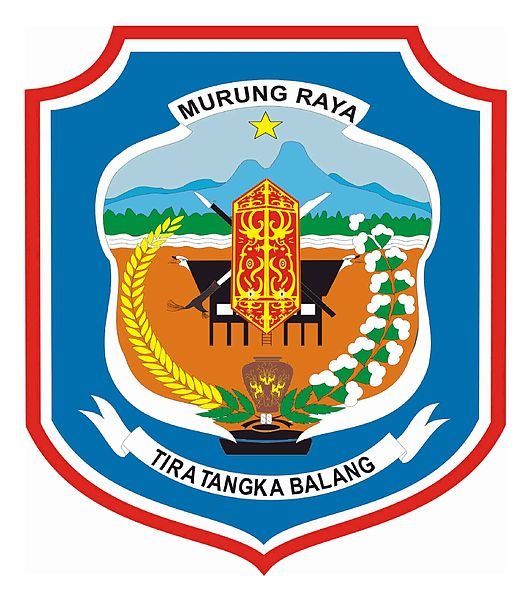
- Coat of arms
- Motto: "Tira Tangka Balang"; Siang language: "Work to Completion"
- Location within Central Kalimantan

- Location in Kalimantan and Indonesia Murung Raya Regency (Indonesia)
- Coordinates: 1°24′30″S 115°8′0″E
- Country: Indonesia
- Region: Kalimantan
- Province: Central Kalimantan
- Capital: Puruk Cahu

Government
  - Regent: Heriyus Midel Yoseph
  - Vice Regent: Rahmanto Muhidin

Area
  - Total: 23,700 km^{2} (9,200 sq mi)
- Highest elevation: 1,730 m (5,680 ft)
- Lowest elevation: 100 m (330 ft)

Population (mid 2025 estimate)
  - Total: 120,222
  - Density: 5.07/km^{2} (13.1/sq mi)
- Time zone: UTC+7 (Western Indonesia Time)
- Area code: (+62) 528
- Website: kabmurungraya.go.id

Murung Raya Regency is the most northerly and geographically the largest of the thirteen regencies (kabupaten) which (together with the independent city of Palangkaraya) comprise the province of Central Kalimantan on the island of Borneo, Indonesia. It was created on 10 April 2002 from the former northwestern two-thirds of the North Barito Regency. The capital of the regency is the town of Puruk Cahu. The regency covers an area of 23,700 km^{2} and had a population of 96,857 inhabitants at the 2010 census (an increase from 74,050 within the current area at the previous census in 2000) and 111,527 at the 2020 census; the official estimate as at mid 2025 was 120,222 (comprising 62,166 males and 58,056 females).

== Administrative districts ==
Murung Raya Regency consists of ten districts (kecamatan), tabulated below with their areas and population totals from the 2010 census and the 2020 census, together with the official estimates as at mid 2025. The 2020 figures for the districts are rounded to the nearest 100 people. The table also includes the locations of the district administrative centres, the number of administrative villages in each district (a total of 116 rural desa and 9 urban kelurahan), and its postal codes.

Kode Wilayah	Name of District (kecamatan)	Area in km^{2}	Pop'n census 2010	Pop'n census 2020	Pop'n estimate mid 2025	Admin centre	No. of villages	Post codes
62.12.04	Permata Intan	804	10,867	12,000	12,499	Tumbang Lahung	12 ^{(a)}	73971
62.12.08	Sungai Babuat	423	2,219	2,500	2,678	Tumbang Bantian	6	73970
62.12.01	Murung	730	29,894	39,600	45,156	Beriwit	15 ^{(b)}	73911
62.12.03	Laung Tuhup	1,611	18,555	20,900	21,940	Muara Laung I	26 ^{(c)}	73992
62.12.06	Barito Tuhup Raya	1,500	4,222	4,900	5,297	Makunjung	11	73991
62.12.02	Tanah Siang	1,239	12,447	13,800	14,383	Saripoi	27 ^{(d)}	73961
62.12.07	Tanah Siang Selatan (South Tanah Siang)	310	4,810	5,600	6,041	Dirung Lingkin	7	73960
62.12.05	Sumber Barito	2,797	7,746	7,000	6,981	Tumbang Kunyi	9 ^{(e)}	73982
62.12.09	Seribu Riam	7,023	3,559	3,200	3,261	Muara Joloi I	7	73981
62.12.10	Uut Murung	7,263	2,538	2,000	1,986	Tumbang Olong I	5	73983
	Totals	23,700	96,857	111,527	120,222	Puruk Cahu	125	

Notes: (a) includes the kelurahan of Muara Bakanon and Tumbang Lahung. (b) includes the kelurahan of Beriwit and Puruk Cahu.
(c) includes the kelurahan of Batu Bua I, Muara Laung I and Muara Tuhup. (d) includes the kelurahan of Saripoi. (e) includes the kelurahan of Tumbang Kunyi.

== Geography ==
The regency has an area of 23,700 km^{2} and lies between 114°27'00 to 115°49'00 East longitude and 0°58'30 North latitude to 1°26'00 South latitude. It occupies the valleys and foothills of the southern and eastern slopes of the Müller Mountains, and rises to 1730 m at Mount Lesung on its northern border. Most of the riverine area lies at an altitude of 100 to 200 m above sea level while the foothills are mostly at an altitude of 400–500 m.

The Betikap and Sepathawung valleys, in the northwest part of the regency have been declared protected areas for orangutans. The Tumbang Topus caves have been the source of discovery of a number of new species.

== Economy ==
Most of the population lives along rivers and relies on them for transportation, food, and agriculture. Aside from the predominant subsistence fishing and farming, the biggest contributors to the economy are forestry and mining. Timber, including high value trees such as Ulin (Eusideroxylon zwageri) and Meranti (genus Shorea), has been commercially extracted since the 1920s, while the mining sector, such as gold and tin mining, has developed since World War II. In the 1990s coal exploration began, and in the 2000s the Haju coal mine started to be developed.

== Climate ==
Puruk Cahu, the seat of the regency has a tropical rainforest climate (Af) with heavy to very heavy rainfall year-round.

Climate data for Puruk Cahu
Month	Jan	Feb	Mar	Apr	May	Jun	Jul	Aug	Sep	Oct	Nov	Dec	Year
Mean daily maximum °C (°F)	29.5 (85.1)	29.8 (85.6)	30.2 (86.4)	30.4 (86.7)	30.5 (86.9)	30.2 (86.4)	30.2 (86.4)	30.5 (86.9)	30.6 (87.1)	30.6 (87.1)	30.2 (86.4)	29.9 (85.8)	30.2 (86.4)
Daily mean °C (°F)	25.9 (78.6)	26.1 (79.0)	26.4 (79.5)	26.5 (79.7)	26.7 (80.1)	26.3 (79.3)	26.2 (79.2)	26.5 (79.7)	26.6 (79.9)	26.5 (79.7)	26.3 (79.3)	26.2 (79.2)	26.4 (79.4)
Mean daily minimum °C (°F)	22.3 (72.1)	22.4 (72.3)	22.6 (72.7)	22.7 (72.9)	22.9 (73.2)	22.5 (72.5)	22.3 (72.1)	22.5 (72.5)	22.6 (72.7)	22.5 (72.5)	22.5 (72.5)	22.5 (72.5)	22.5 (72.5)
Average rainfall mm (inches)	324 (12.8)	291 (11.5)	340 (13.4)	367 (14.4)	332 (13.1)	197 (7.8)	180 (7.1)	211 (8.3)	223 (8.8)	260 (10.2)	374 (14.7)	457 (18.0)	3,556 (140.1)
Source: Climate-Data.org
