= 2010 Indonesian census =

2010 Population Census Sensus Penduduk 2010
← 2000	15 May 2010	2020 →
- Logo of Badan Pusat Statistik (BPS) Indonesia

General information
- Country: Indonesia
- Authority: Statistics Indonesia

Results
- Total population: 237,641,326 (▲15.2%)
- Most populous province: West Java (43,053,732)
- Least populous province: West Papua (760,422)

The Indonesia 2010 census was conducted by Statistics Indonesia in May 2010.

== Result ==
=== Total population ===
It found the total population of Indonesia to be 237,641,334 people. Compared to the population in the year 2000 of 206,264,595 people, this is an increase of 31,376,831 people (15.37% in 10 years or an average of 1.54% per year). The data counts 236,728,379 Indonesian citizens (both settled and nomadic) as well as 73,217 foreign citizens residing in Indonesia for at least six months, and 839,730 unaccounted for.

=== Sex ratio ===
It found the sex ratio for Indonesia is 101, which means that for every 100 females, there are 101 males. The largest ratio is in Papua with 113, and the smallest is in Nusa Tenggara Barat, with 95 men for every 100 women.

=== Urbanisation ===
The statistic shows that about 50% of Indonesia's population currently lives in an urban area, the other half lives in a rural area. Classification is based on a score calculated from the density of population, percentage of households working in agriculture, and availability of city facilities such as schools, markets, hospitals, paved roads, and electricity.

=== Education ===
The statistics shows that 5.22% of Indonesia's population have studied postsecondary school, while 9.28% do not go to school at all. Of the primary and secondary schools, about 30% had completed their primary education while 2-% only had some primary education. About 17% each attain a junior or senior high diploma, 1.92% go to vocational school. Of the Indonesians that have attained a postsecondary degree, 1.89% have gained a diploma or equivalent to an associate degree, 3.09% have gained a bachelor's degree, less than half a percent continue onto postgraduate.

=== Religion ===
Religion	Percentage of population as of 2010 Census
Islam	87.18
Protestant	6.96
Catholic	2.91
Hinduism	1.69
Buddhism	0.72
Confucianism	0.05
Unanswered	0.06
Not asked	0.32

=== By island ===
Island(s)	Percentage of population as of 2010 Census	Percentage of population as of 2000 Census	Percentage of area of Indonesia
Sumatra	21.31	21.00	25.43
Java	57.49	58.83	6.75
Kalimantan	5.80	5.49	25.43
Sulawesi	7.31	7.25	10.14
Bali & Nusa Tenggara	5.50	5.39	3.87
Maluku & Papua	2.60	2.04	23.45

==== By province ====
Zone	Administrative region	Population as of 2010 Census	Population as of 2000 Census	Numerical change
11	Aceh	4,494,410	3,930,905	▲563,405
12	North Sumatra	12,982,204	11,649,655	▲1,332,549
13	West Sumatra	4,846,909	4,248,931	▲597,978
14	Riau	5,538,367	4,957,627	▲580,740
15	Jambi	3,092,265	2,413,846	▲678,419
16	South Sumatra	7,450,394	6,899,675	▲550,719
17	Bengkulu	1,715,518	1,567,432	▲148,086
18	Lampung	7,608,405	6,741,439	▲866,964
19	Bangka Belitung	1,223,296	900,197	▲323,099
21	Riau Islands	1,679,163	(merged with Riau)	Steady
31	Jakarta Special Capital Region	9,607,787	8,389,443	▲1,318,344
32	West Java	43,053,732	35,729,537	▲7,324,195
33	Central Java	32,382,657	31,228,940	▲1,153,517
34	Yogyakarta Special Region	3,457,491	3,122,268	▲335,223
35	East Java	37,476,757	34,783,640	▲2,693,117
36	Banten	10,632,166	8,098,780	▲1,533,386
51	Bali	3 890 757	3 151 162	▲739,595
52	West Nusa Tenggara	4,500,212	4,009,261	▲490,951
53	East Nusa Tenggara	4,683,827	3,952,279	▲731,548
61	West Kalimantan	4 395 983	4 034 198	▲351,785
62	Central Kalimantan	2,212,089	1,857,000	▲355,089
63	South Kalimantan	3 626 616	2 985 240	▲641,376
64	East Kalimantan	3,553,143	2,455,120	▲1,098,023
71	North Sulawesi	2,270,596	2,012,098	▲258,498
72	Central Sulawesi	2,635,009	2,218,435	▲416,574
73	South Sulawesi	8,034,776	8,059,627	▼24,951
74	Southeast Sulawesi	2,232,586	1,821,284	▲411,302
75	Gorontalo	1,040,164	835,044	▲205,120
76	West Sulawesi	1,158,651	(merged with South Sulawesi)	Steady
81	Maluku	1,533,506	1,205,539	▲328,965
82	North Maluku	1,038,087	785,059	▲253,028
83	West Papua	760,422	(merged with Papua)	Steady
84	Papua	2,833,381	2,220,934	▲612,447
—	National total (excluding below)	237,641,326	206,264,595	▲31,377,731
