= List of incumbent regional heads and deputy regional heads in Central Kalimantan =

The following is an article about the list of Regional Heads and Deputy Regional Heads in 14 regencies/cities in Central Kalimantan who are currently still serving.

== List ==
Regency/ City	Photo of the Regent/ Mayor	Regent/ Mayor	Photo of Deputy Regent/ Mayor	Deputy Regent/ Mayor	Taking Office	End of Office (Planned)	Ref.
South Barito; Regency List of Regents/Deputy Regents		Eddy Raya Samsuri		Khristianto Yudha	20 February 2025	20 February 2030	
East Barito; Regency List of Regents/Deputy Regents		Muhammad Yamin		Adi Mula Nakalelu	20 February 2025	20 February 2030	
North Barito; Regency List of Regents/Deputy Regents		Shalahuddin		Felix Sonadie Y. Tingan	10 October 2025	10 October 2030	
Gunung Mas; Regency List of Regents/Deputy Regents		Jaya Samaya Monong		Efrensia L. P. Umbing	20 February 2025	20 February 2030	
Kapuas; Regency List of Regents/Deputy Regents		Muhammad Wiyatno		Dodo	20 February 2025	20 February 2030	
Katingan; Regency List of Regents/Deputy Regents		Saiful		Firdaus	20 February 2025	20 February 2030	
West Kotawaringin; Regency List of Regents/Deputy Regents		Nurhidayah		Suyanto	20 February 2025	20 February 2030	
East Kotawaringin; Regency List of Regents/Deputy Regents		Halikinnor		Irawati	20 February 2025	20 February 2030	
Lamandau; Regency List of Regents/Deputy Regents		Rizky Aditya Putra		Abdul Hamid	24 March 2025	24 March 2030	
Murung Raya; Regency List of Regents/Deputy Regents		Heriyus Midel Yoseph		Rahmanto Muhidin	20 February 2025	20 February 2030	
Pulang Pisau; Regency List of Regents/Deputy Regents		Ahmad Rifa'i		Ahmad Jayadikarta	20 February 2025	20 February 2030	
Seruyan; Regency List of Regents/Deputy Regents		Ahmad Selanorwanda		Supian	20 February 2025	20 February 2030	
Sukamara; Regency List of Regents/Deputy Regents		Masduki		Nur Efendi	20 February 2025	20 February 2030	
Palangka Raya; City List of Mayors/Deputy mayors		Fairid Naparin		Achmad Zaini	20 February 2025	20 February 2030	

Notes

- "Commencement of office" is the inauguration date at the beginning or during the current term of office. For acting regents/mayors, it is the date of appointment or extension as acting regent/mayor.
- Based on the Constitutional Court decision Number 27/PUU-XXII/2024, the Governor and Deputy Governor, Regent and Deputy Regent, and Mayor and Deputy Mayor elected in 2020 shall serve until the inauguration of the Governor and Deputy Governor, Regent and Deputy Regent, and Mayor and Deputy Mayor elected in the 2024 national simultaneous elections as long as the term of office does not exceed 5 (five) years.

== See also ==
- Central Kalimantan
