= Isen Mulang Palace =

Coordinates: 2.2062°S 113.9186°E

- Istana Isen Mulang
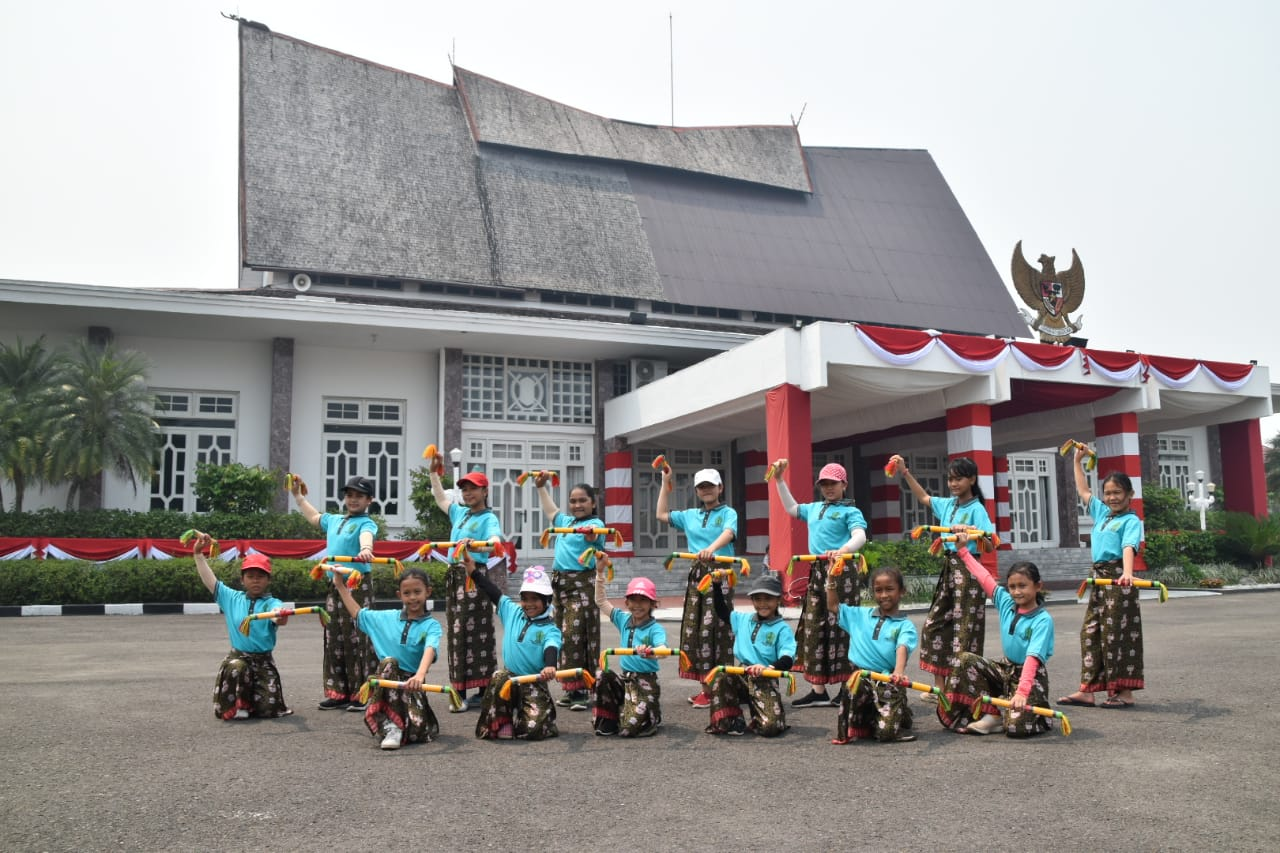
- Dance performance in front off Isen Mulang Palace
- Interactive map of the Isen Mulang Palace area

General information
- Location: Jl. Brigjen Katamso No. 9, Pahandut, Palangka Raya 73112 (Indonesia)

Isen Mulang Palace (Indonesian: Istana Isen Mulang) is a building used as official residence of Central Kalimantan governor. The building is located in city of Palangka Raya, in Pahandut district. The building was designed personally by Indonesia's first president Sukarno, who also designed planning of the entire city during its early foundation.

The building was modeled after Dayak traditional longhouse (rumah betang). It is frequently used by governor of Central Kalimantan as a place to meet with high-ranking guests such as presidents or other government officials. It has special guest rooms which was used as a resting place for incoming guest, because previously the city had limited hotel rooms especially during its early days, but today is rarely used.
