= Katingan =

Katingan may be,

- Katingan Regency, Borneo
- Katingan language
