= USS Motive =

Minesweeper of the United States Navy

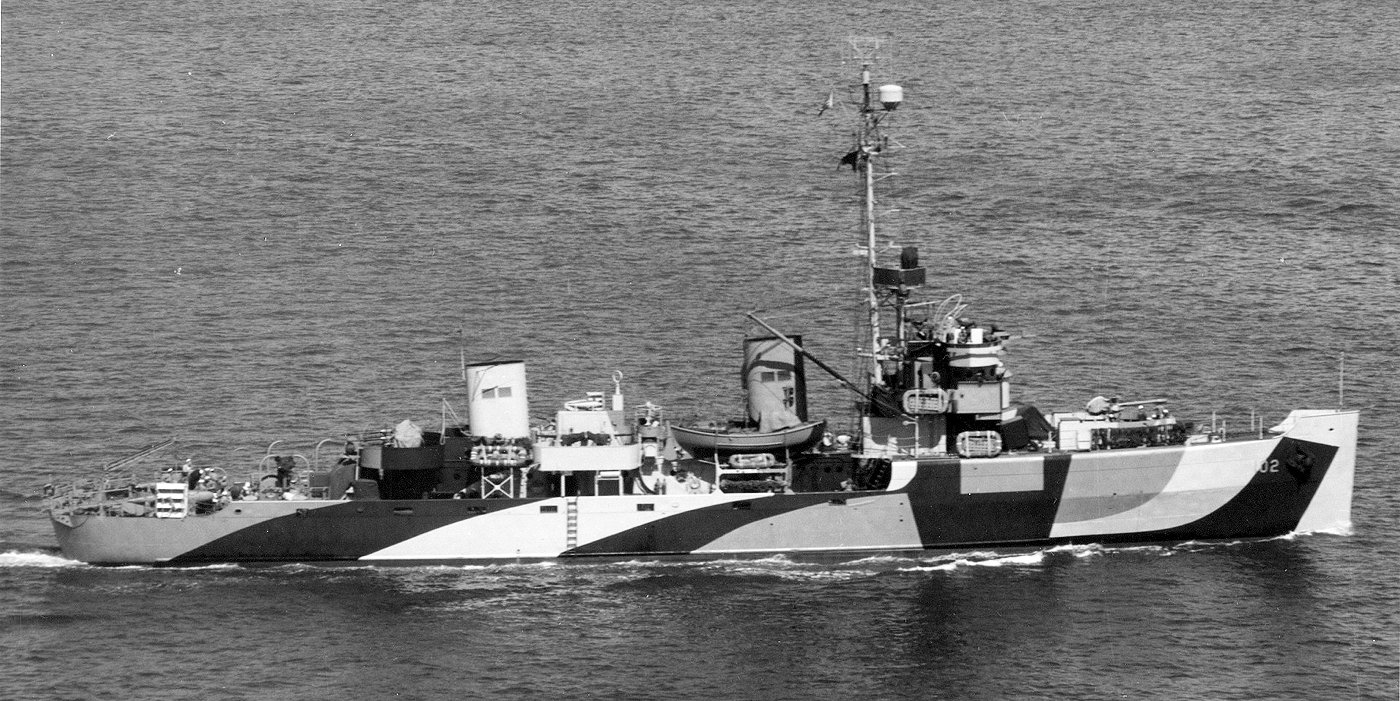
- Motive at San Pedro, California on 13 May 1944

History

United States
- Name: USS Motive (AM-102)
- Builder: General Engineering & Dry Dock Company, Alameda, California
- Laid down: 14 April 1942
- Launched: 17 August 1942
- Commissioned: 17 April 1943
- Decommissioned: 15 June 1946
- Reclassified: MSF-102, 7 February 1955
- Stricken: 1 December 1966
- Honours and awards: 3 battle stars (World War II)
- Fate: Destroyed as a target, April 1968

General characteristics
- Class & type: Auk-class minesweeper
- Displacement: 890 long tons (904 t)
- Length: 221 ft 3 in (67.44 m)
- Beam: 32 ft (9.8 m)
- Draft: 10 ft 9 in (3.28 m)
- Speed: 18 knots (33 km/h; 21 mph)
- Complement: 100 officers and enlisted
- Armament: 1 × 3"/50 caliber gun; 2 × 40 mm guns; 2 × 20 mm guns; 2 × Depth charge tracks

USS Motive (AM-102) was an Auk-class minesweeper built for the United States Navy during World War II. She earned three battle stars for World War II service. She was decommissioned in 1946 and placed in reserve where she remained until struck from the Naval Vessel Register in December 1966. She was sunk as a target in April 1968.

== Career ==
Motive was laid down on 14 April 1942 by the General Engineering & Dry Dock Company of Alameda, California; launched on 17 August 1942; and commissioned on 17 April 1943. After shakedown, Motive got underway from San Francisco, California, 5 June 1943 and arrived Dutch Harbor, Unalaska Island, on 14 June. She made one round trip back to Alameda, California as a convoy escort from 26 June to 14 August Motive then operated continuously in the Aleutian Islands for the next four months as convoy escort and anti-submarine patrol. On 13 October, while anchored in Massacre Bay, Attu Island, Motive was attacked by about ten Japanese aircraft making a fast high level attack. She received six near misses from 100-pound bombs but no damage, and drove the enemy planes off with gunfire.

Motive sailed for Pearl Harbor on 1 December, and on 22 January 1944 sailed for Kwajalein, where she conducted minesweeping and antisubmarine operations until 14 February, when she departed for Pearl Harbor and repairs in California. Returning to Pearl Harbor on 22 May, she joined TF 52 for the capture of Saipan, whose assault began on 15 June. Motive, in TG 52.9, the demonstration group, participated in the dawn feint on the beaches north of Tanapag town, while the actual landings were taking place at Charan Kanoa. On patrol as antisubmarine and screening vessel, Motive fired on Japanese aircraft on 16, 17, and 18 June, and was strafed by a Zero on 17 June, receiving a number of hits which were quickly repaired.

Motive left Saipan for Eniwetok on 24 June, returning 9 July. She then conducted sweeping operations off the east coast of Saipan and undertook antisubmarine patrols. From 24 July until November Motive served as a convoy escort, antisubmarine patrol and screening ship, operating out of Saipan, Eniwetok, Guam, and Ulithi. While at Ulithi with a convoy on 20 November, Motive observed the torpedoing of Mississinewa (AO-59) which broke into flame. The convoy got underway for Guam without further incident.

For the next five months Motive served on convoy escort antisubmarine, and screening patrols and hydrographic surveys out of Peleliu, Palaus; Guam; Eniwetok; Saipan; and Iwo Jima.

On 25 April 1945 Motive headed back for the west coast, touching at Pearl Harbor and San Francisco, California, before arriving 24 May at Seattle, Washington, for overhaul. As the war in the Pacific ended, Motive left Seattle, Washington, 4 September for Sasebo, Japan, arriving 20 October. From 28 October to 25 November she swept for mines in the East China Sea, locating and destroying a total of 31. On 28 November Motive moored in Keelung Harbor, Kurun, Taiwan, and on 7 December went into drydock at Shanghai. She returned to Sasebo 21 December.

Motive departed Sasebo, Japan, on 1 January 1946 for the U.S. West Coast, and was decommissioned and placed in reserve at San Diego, California, 15 June 1946. Motive received three battle stars for World War II service.

Although she remained inactive, Motive was reclassified as MSF-102 on 7 February 1955. She was struck from the Naval Vessel Register on 1 December 1966 and destroyed as a target by the Pacific Fleet in April 1968.
