= Kasongan =

Kasongan Kasongan Kota
- Regency seat
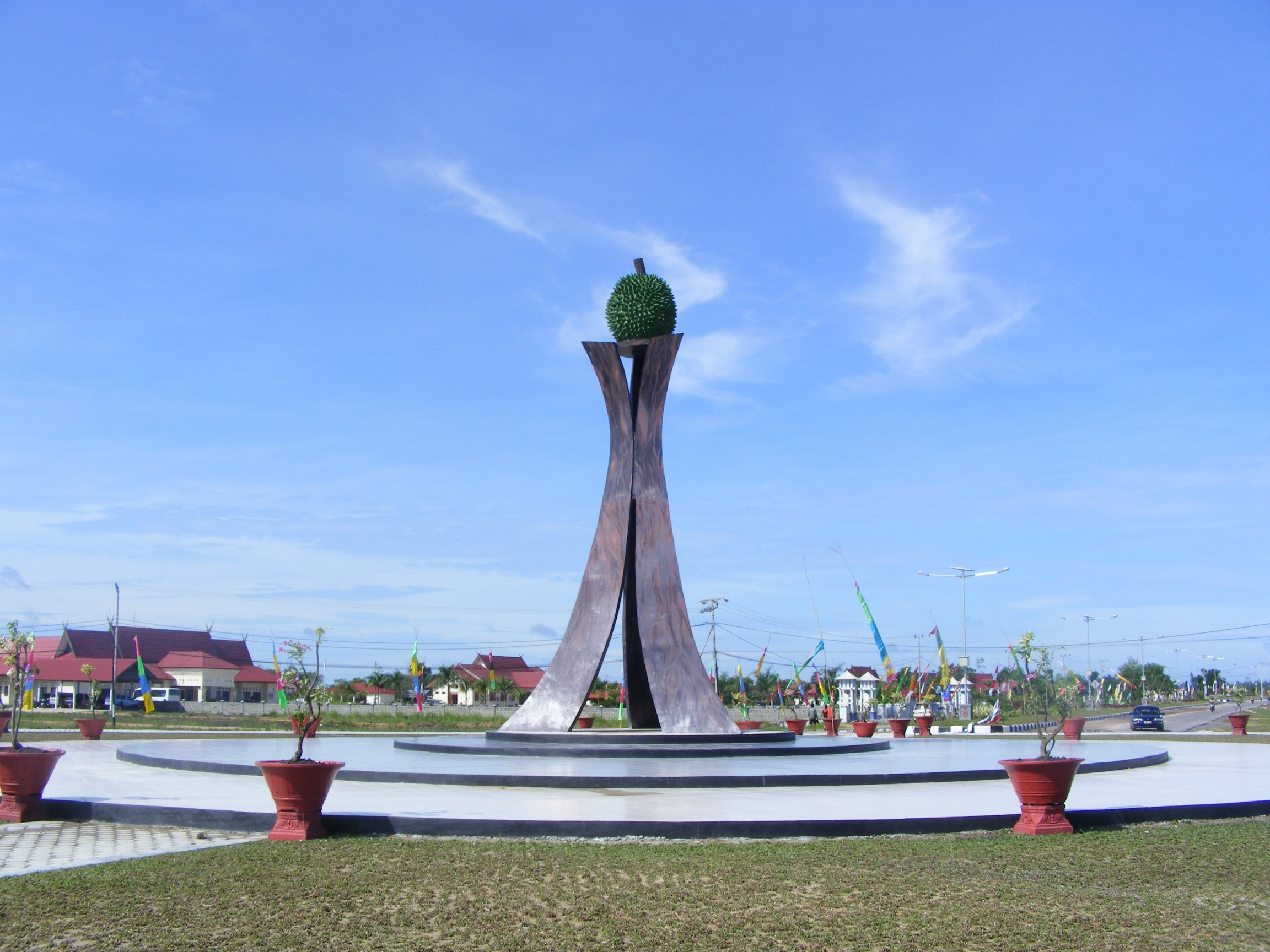
- Durian Roundabout Monument in Kasongan
- Motto(s): "Penyang Hinje Simpei"; Ngaju language: "Harmonious & Peaceful Living for Collective Prosperity"
- Location in Central Kalimantan, Indonesia Kasongan (Indonesia)
- Coordinates: 1°53′45″S 113°23′16″E
- Country: Indonesia
- Province: Central Kalimantan
- Regency: Katingan Regency
- District: Katingan Hilir

Area
  - Total: 117.9 km^{2} (45.5 sq mi)
- Elevation: 22 m (72 ft)

Population (2021)
  - Total: 18,572
  - Density: 157.5/km^{2} (408/sq mi)
- Time zone: UTC+7 (Western Indonesian Time)
- Postal code: 74413
- Area code: +62536

Kasongan (abbreviated: KSN) is the regency seat of Katingan Regency and also one of the towns in Central Kalimantan. This town is at a distance of 80 km west-northwest of Palangka Raya city, the capital of Central Kalimantan Province. This town also consists of 2 sub-districts i.e. the sub-district of Old Kasongan and New Kasongan. The population of this town is approximately 18,572 people as of 2021.

== Demographics ==
As of 2021, the population of Kasongan is about 18,572 inhabitants which represents 45.7% of the population of Katingan Hilir district and 11.39% of the entire population of Katingan Regency. The population density of this town is approximately 157.5 people/km². This town has 8,040 households and the average household size of this town is 2.3 people. The sex ratio of Kasongan is 104 which means there are 104 males to every 100 females. The majority of the town's population identify as Muslims (74.3%) and the rest of the population identify as Christians (23.9%), Hindu/Kaharingan (1.78%), and Buddhists (0.02%).

== Geography ==
Kasongan, Central Kalimantan

Climate chart (precipitation, max. and min. temperature)
J	F	M	A	M	J	J	A	S	O	N	D
327 31 24	291 31 24	330 31 24	315 31 24	251 31 24	194 31 24	139 31 23	111 32 23	136 33 24	218 33 24	324 31 24	332 31 24
- █ Average max. and min. temperatures in °C
- █ Precipitation totals in mm
- Source: Climate-Data.org & BMKG
Imperial conversion
J	F	M	A	M	J	J	A	S	O	N	D
13 88 74	11 88 74	13 88 75	12 88 75	9.9 88 75	7.6 88 74	5.5 88 74	4.4 89 74	5.4 91 75	8.6 91 75	13 89 74	13 88 74
- █ Average max. and min. temperatures in °F
- █ Precipitation totals in inches

Kasongan is located at the heart of Central Kalimantan. To be precise, this town is located at 1.8959 south and 113.3878 east. Kasongan is situated at the centre of Katingan Regency. Also, this town is located a bit to the northwest of Palangka Raya city as the capital of Central Kalimantan with the distance of 80 km. The total area of Kasongan is about 117.9 km² which makes it roughly 0.67% of the entire area of Katingan Regency.

This town is crossed by the Katingan river as it is situated within the Katingan river basin. Kasongan is situated in the heart of Central Kalimantan flatlands with the altitude being 22 metres above sea level. This town consists of two different sub-districts within the Katingan Hilir district i.e. the sub-district of Old Kasongan and the sub-district of New Kasongan. As any other town in Kalimantan, Kasongan experiences tropical equatorial climate (Af) with high amounts of rainfall almost all year long, constantly high humidity, and warm-to-hot temperature all year round.

== Education ==
As of 2021, Kasongan has fourteen primary schools (eleven public schools and three private schools), seven middle schools (three public schools and four private schools), five high schools (one public school and four private schools), and one public vocational.

== Public facilities ==
For healthcare facility, Kasongan currently has one general hospital, two public health centres, and six pharmacies. For economic, trade, and accommodation facilities, this town recently has five markets, six banks, fourteen shopping complexes, sixteen convenience shops, 38 restaurants/food stalls, two hotels, and eleven inns. For religious facility, Kasongan has seventeen Islamic religious facilities, eleven Protestant churches, one Catholic church, one Christian chapel, and one Kaharingan temple. This town is served by Tumbang Samba Airport located at the neighbouring district of Katingan Tengah at a distance of about 88 km.
