= Trans Palangka Raya =

Bus rapid transit system in Indonesia

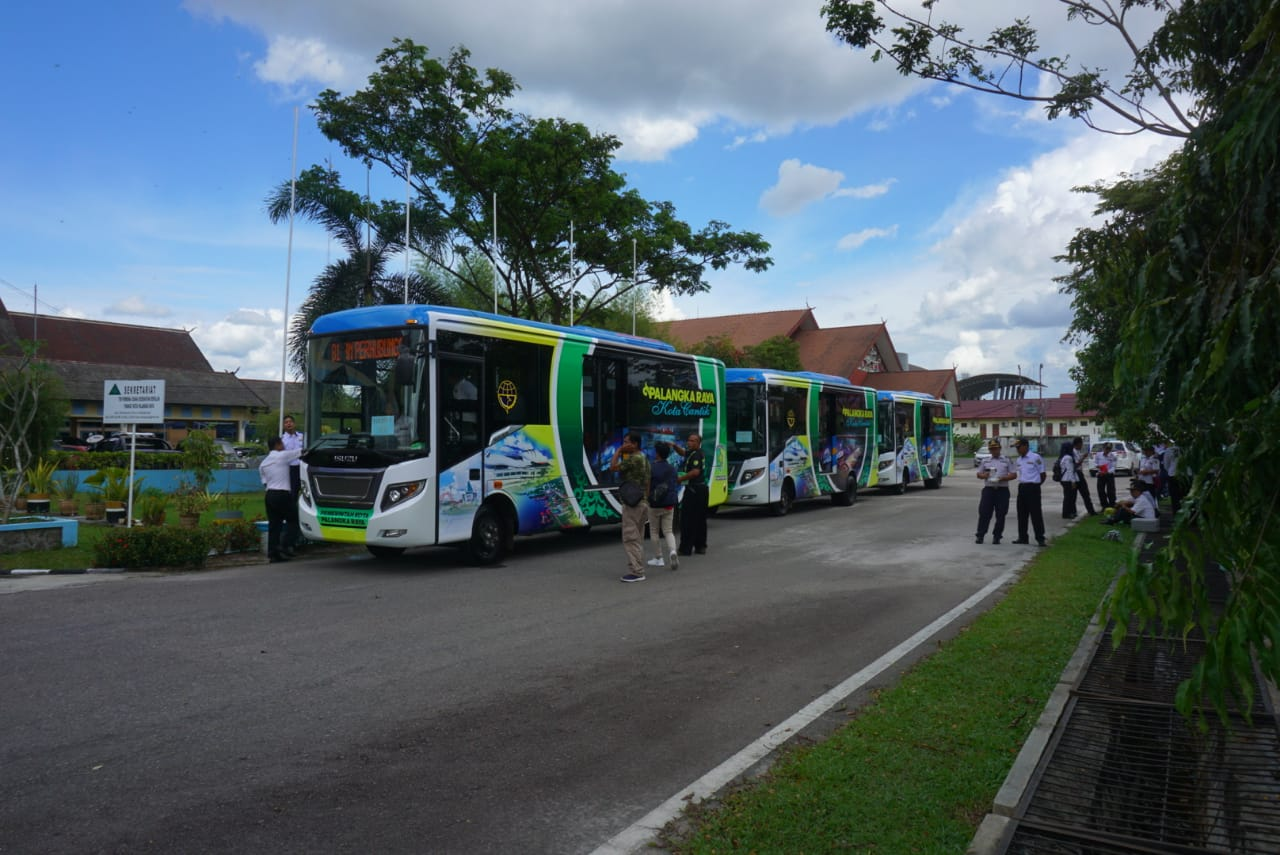
- Fleet of Trans Palangka Raya bus

Overview
- Area served: Palangka Raya
- Transit type: Bus rapid transit
- Number of lines: 5
- Number of stations: 26 as of 2019

Operation
- Began operation: 2 February 2018; 8 years ago
- Operator: Ministry of Transportation

Trans Palangka Raya is a public bus rapid transit system serving city of Palangka Raya in Central Kalimantan, Indonesia. As of 2019, the bus served 5 routes and consist of 26 bus stops. Bus operation was suspended by city government during COVID-19 outbreak in the city, but later resumed operation on 8 November 2020.

The bus service is currently free of charge as of 2021 and subsidized by city government. The creation of bus system was initiated by city government to facilitate people of the city to access administration & healthcare services that mostly located in city center. The bus service also operated with a call center and SMS-based info about routes and schedules, in addition to WhatsApp-based info.

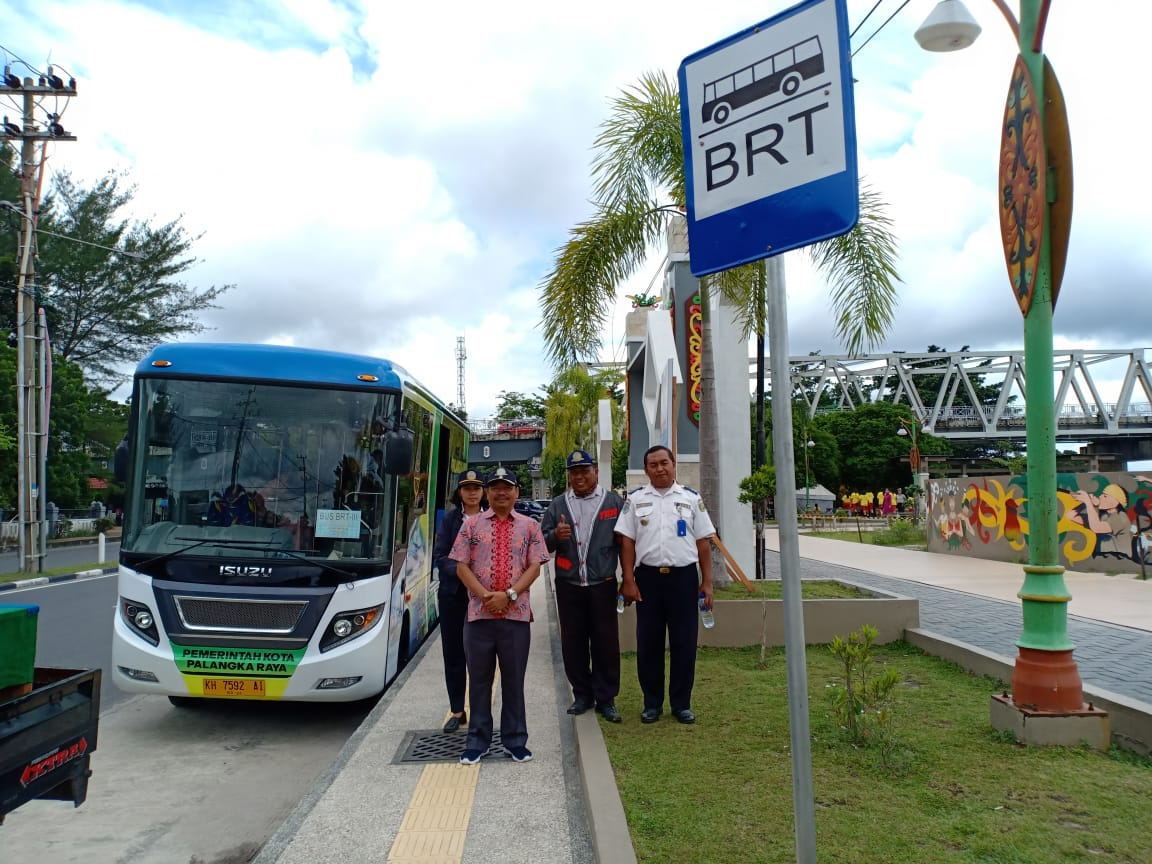
A Trans Palangka Raya bus during demo
