= University of Palangka Raya =

Public university in Central Kalimantan, Indonesia

Coordinates: 2.2171°S 113.8970°E

Universitas Palangka Raya
- Indonesian: Universitas Palangka Raya
- Other names: UPR
- Motto: Building Bright Future
- Type: State university
- Established: November 10, 1963; 62 years ago
- Affiliations: ASAIHL
- Rector: Prof. Dr. Ir. Salampak, M.S.
- Location: Palangka Raya, Central Kalimantan, Indonesia
- Campus: Kampus UPR Tunjung Nyaho Jalan Yos Sudarso, Palangka Raya, Kalimantan Tengah, Indonesia
- Colours: Yellow
- Website: www.upr.ac.id

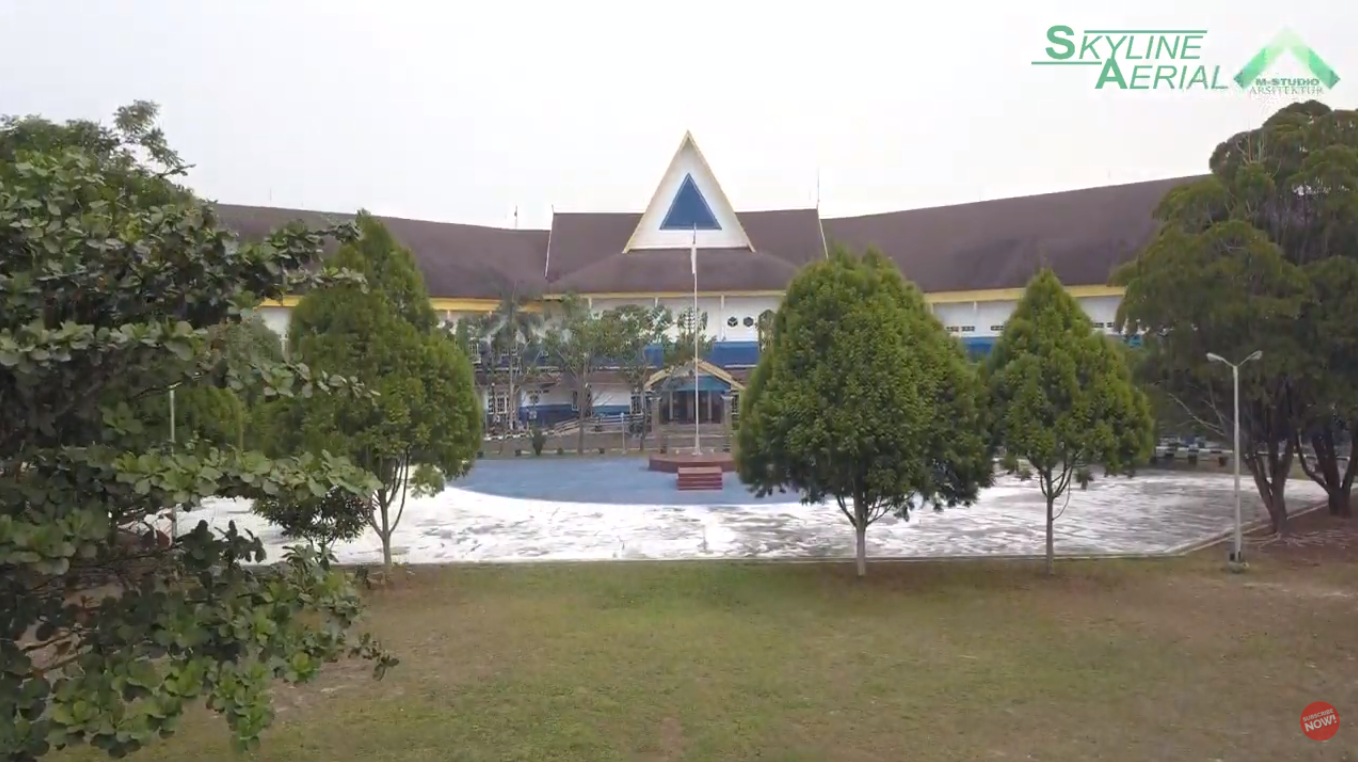
Palangka Raya University Rector Complex

The University of Palangka Raya (Indonesian: Universitas Palangka Raya, UPR) is a state university located in Palangka Raya, Central Kalimantan, in the Republic of Indonesia. The university was established on November 10, 1963, and is the first and the oldest state university in Central Kalimantan. UPR consists of eight faculties: Education, Economics and Business, Agriculture, Engineering, Law, Social and Political Science, Medicine, and Mathematics and Sciences. The rector is Prof. Dr. Ir. Salampak, M.S. As of January 2020, it was ranked 67th out of all the universities in the Republic of Indonesia, and was accredited B grade by the National Higher Education Accreditation Board (BAN-PT).

== Faculties ==
There are eight faculties and 36 undergraduate programs (S1) offered at University of Palangka Raya:

- Faculty of Education
- Faculty of Economics and Business
- Faculty of Agriculture
- Faculty of Engineering
- Faculty of Law
- Faculty of Social and Political Science
- Faculty of Medicine
- Faculty of Mathematics and Sciences

The University of Palangka Raya offers a number of postgraduate courses:
