= Gunung Mas Regency =

Regency in Central Kalimantan, Indonesia

Gunung Mas Regency Kabupaten Gunung Mas
- Regency
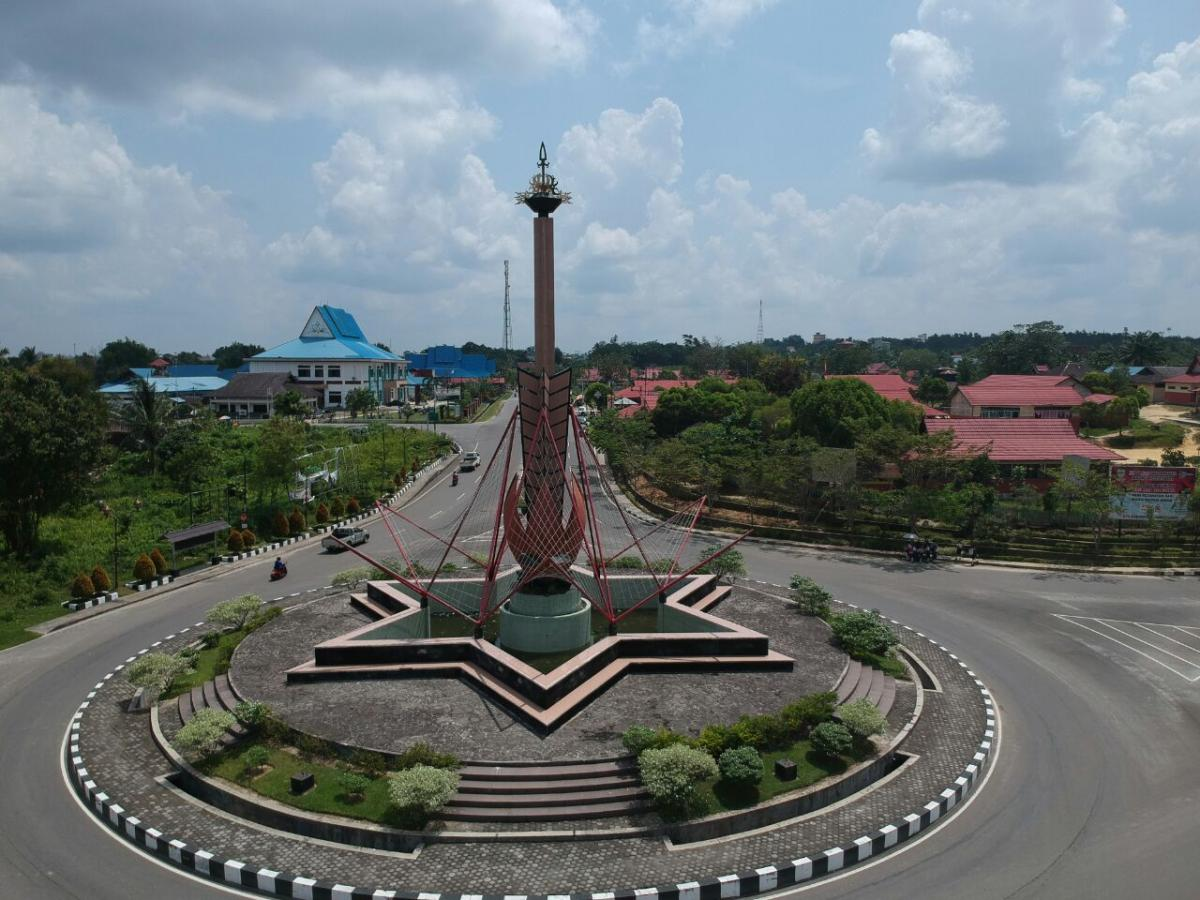
- Duhung Roundabout in town of Kuala Kurun

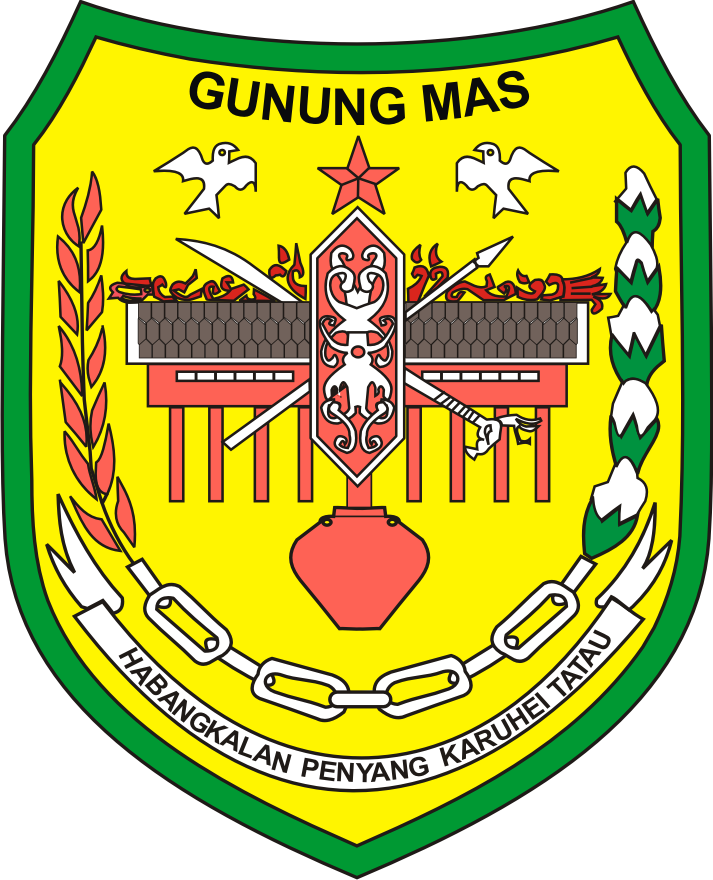
- Coat of arms
- Motto(s): "Habangkalan Penyang Karuhei Tatau"; Ngaju language: "Determination, passion, and effort to be prosperous"
- Location within Central Kalimantan

- Location in Kalimantan and Indonesia Gunung Mas Regency (Indonesia)
- Coordinates: 0.9500°S 113.5000°E
- Country: Indonesia
- Province: Central Kalimantan
- Regency seat: Kuala Kurun

Government
  - Regent: Jaya Samaya Monong
  - Vice Regent: Efrensia Umbing

Area
  - Total: 9,305.76 km^{2} (3,592.97 sq mi)

Population (mid 2025 estimate)
  - Total: 148,233
  - Density: 15.9292/km^{2} (41.2564/sq mi)
- Time zone: UTC+7 (Western Indonesia Time)
- Area code: (+62) 537
- HDI (2019): ▲0.707 (High)
- Website: gunungmaskab.go.id

Gunung Mas Regency (Indonesian: Kabupaten Gunung Mas) is one of the thirteen regencies of Central Kalimantan Province, Indonesia. The regency seat is located at the town of Kuala Kurun in Kurun District. The land area of Gunung Mas Regency is 9,305.76 km^{2}, and its population was 96,990 at the 2010 census (an increase from 74,823 at the previous census in 2000) and 135,373 at the 2020 census; the official estimate as at mid 2025 was 148,233 (comprising 77,730 males and 70,510 females). The regency initially existed between 1965 and 1979, after which it was a district within Kapuas Regency. Its status as a separate regency was restored on 10 April 2002 following rapid decentralization and democratization after the fall of Suharto. The regency has the 5th highest Human Development Index in the province.

== History ==
=== Etymology ===
The regency's name literally translates to "gold mountain". The name originates the abundance of gold during the Dutch East Indies era, especially around the village of Sumur Mas, which name literally translates to "well of gold", while a nearby mountain is named "Gunung Mas". Remains of the colonial era gold industry, such as abandoned factory chimneys and holes used to mine gold, can still be seen in the region today such .

Due to its colonial origin, there have been calls to change the name of the regency, such as by the local government, which argues that the name does not reflect the regency's motto, Habangkalan Penyang Karuhei Tatau, which is derived from the local Ngaju language and local wisdom.

=== Creation ===
The regency was initially created on 1 October 1964 as Kahayan Hulu Administrative Regency, and was renamed Gunung Mas Administrative Regency on 1 May 1965. On 28 April 1979, the regency became a subdivision of the larger Kapuas Regency, while the title of its administrative head changed from a regent (bupati) to chief office of assistant for Gunung Mas region.

In 1999, after Reformasi, the region became Kurun District (kecamatan). Subsequently, demands were made by local figures, traditional Dayak chiefs, and residents of the region in the "Declaration by Gunung Mas Society" (Indonesian:Deklasari Masyarakat Gunung Mas). The declaration resulted in three points, which:

1. To acknowledge Wednesday the 21st of March 2001 as the birth date of Gunung Mas Regency with the regency seat in Kuala Kurun.
2. To demand central government of Indonesia to proceed with the creation of the Gunung Mas Regency in accordance of the law.
3. Other matters to fulfill the requirements for the establishment of a regency as written in the Government Regulation No. 129 of 2000 will be processed in the shortest possible time.

The declaration was read on 21 March 2001, and as a result, the regency was formed on 10 April 2002 based on Law Number 5 of 2002.

== Governance ==
=== Local government ===
The Gunung Mas Regency is a second-level administrative division equivalent to a city, and is headed by a democratically elected regent. District heads are appointed directly by the regent on the recommendation of the regency secretary. Executive power lies with the regent and vice regent while legislative function is exercised by the regency's parliament.

=== Politics ===
Together with Palangka Raya and Katingan Regency, the regency forms part of the 1st Central Kalimantan electoral district, electing 10 out of 45 representatives in the provincial parliament. At the local level, the regency is divided into three electoral districts which have a total of 25 representatives.

Electoral districts	Region	Representatives
1st Gunung Mas	Kurun, Mihing Raya, and Sepang District	8
2nd Gunung Mas	Manuhing Raya, Manuhing, Rungan, West Rungan, and Rungan Hulu District	9
3rd Gunung Mas	Damang Batu, North Kahayan Hulu, Miri Manasa, and Tewah District	8
Total		25

=== Administrative divisions ===
The regency is divided into twelve administrative districts (kecamatan). Kurun, where the town of Kuala Kurun is located, is the regency's most populous district with 25.9% of regency's total population in 2025. The fastest growing district in 2025 was Mihing Raya with annual growth of 3.19% while the least was Miri Manasa with 0.32%. The most dense district is also Kurun, with density of 49.83 people per square kilometre in mid 2022, while the least dense was Miri Manasa with just 3.0 people per square kilometre. The gender ratio varies from district to district as at 2025, from 116.05 males for every 100 females in Miri Manasa to 105.56 males for every 100 females in Sepang. The areas and the populations at the 2010 and 2020 Censuses for all the districts are listed below, together with their official estimates as at mid 2025. The table also includes the locations of the district administrative centres, the numbers of villages in each district (totaling 114 rural desa and 13 urban kelurahan), and its post codes.

Area code	Name of District (kecamatan)	Area in km^{2}	Pop'n census 2010	Pop'n census 2020	Pop'n estimate mid 2025	Admin centre	No. of villages	Postal code
62.10.06	Manuhing	838.18	7,288	11,278	12,871	Tumbang Talaken	12	74562
62.10.11	Manuhing Raya	654.08	4,965	6,311	6,548	Tehang	6	74563
62.10.05	Rungan	976.18	14,061	12,851	13,833	Jakatan Raya	14	74560
62.10.10	Rungan Hulu	468.04	6,526	7,456	7,819	Tumbang Rahuyan	9	74561
62.10.12	Rungan Barat (West Rungan)	346.70	(Note: The 2010 population of West Rungan is included in the figures for Rungan and Rungan Hulu Districts, from which it was split.)	6,699	6,823	Rabambang	11	74561 (Note: Except for the village of Mangkawuk, which has a post code of 74562.)
62.10.01	Sepang	368.04	6,112	9,014	10,463	Sepang Simin	7	74570
62.10.07	Mihing Raya	383.07	4,833	7,748	8,995	Kampuri	6	74571
62.10.02	Kurun	770.78	21,825	33,617	38,407	Kuala Kurun	15	74511
62.10.03	Tewah	853.07	16,679	22,028	23,338	Tewah	16	74552
62.10.04	Kahayan Hulu Utara (Upper North Kahayan)	421.72	7,421	8,746	8,878	Tumbang Miri	12	74554
62.10.08	Damang Batu	1,822.45	3,638	5,475	6,045	Tumbang Marikoi	8	74553
62.10.09	Miri Manasa	1,403.43	3,642	4,150	4,213	Tumbang Napoi	11	74555
	Totals	9,305.76	96,900	135,373	148,233	Kuala Kurun	127	

The 13 kelurahan comprise the administrative centres of each of the districts, plus the further town of Tampang Tumbang Anjir in Kurun District.

== Demographics ==
Religious Adherence in Gunung Mas Regency (2022)
1. Protestant (64.9%)
2. Islam (20.0%)
3. Kaharingan/Hindu (12.8%)
4. Catholic (2.21%)
5. Buddhism, Confucianism, and others (0.05%)

Population growth
Year	Pop.	±%
2000	76,067	—
2005	81,933	+7.7%
2010	96,990	+18.4%
2015	109,947	+13.4%
2020	135,373	+23.1%
2025	148,233	+9.5%
Source: Central Bureau of Statistics, 2026 and earlier years

As of mid 2025, the estimated population of Gunung Mas regency was 148,233 people which included 77,730 male population and 70,510 female population. The sex ratio in Gunung Mas is roughly 110 which can be translated as there are 110 male population for every 100 female population. The population density of this regency on average is 15.93 people/km^{2} with the highest density of 48.83 people/km^{2} located in Kurun district and the lowest density of only 3.0 people/km^{2} in Miri Manasa district. The average rate of population growth of Gunung Mas Regency is ranging from 2% to 4% and as of mid 2025 the rate is about 1.93% from the number in mid 2024.

In terms of religious adherence, Gunung Mas Regency is the only regency in Central Kalimantan with a predominantly Christian population. Almost 68% of the population are nominally claimed as Christians which consist of 65% claimed as Protestants and roughly 2% claimed as Roman Catholics. Islam comes the second after Christianity with only 20%. And the rest with rough 12% claimed as either Kaharingan believers, Hindus, Buddhists, and others.

== Economy ==
In 2021, the regency had a total gross regional domestic product (GRDP) of 3,619 billion rupiahs. While the region's economy was historically centered around mining, especially that of gold, the largest economic sector in the regency as of 2021 is agriculture and fisheries, making up 29.24% of the regency's GRDP, followed by construction with 11.89%, trade with 10.08%, and manufacturing with 8.25%. The regency's agricultural output includes 100,347 tons of palm oil, 1,152 tons of rice, 5,004 quintals of durian, 414 quintals of mango, and 730 quintals of banana. As of 2021, the fastest growing sector in the economy was internet and communication, with 18.43% growth, followed by electricity and gas with 15.59%, and healthcare with 9.71%.

In 2021, the regency had 15 operating banks, and 218 registered cooperatives, an increase of 2.83% from the previous year. In addition, the regency had a 2.49% unemployment rate and a 4.75% poverty rate in the same year.

== Infrastructure ==
=== Education ===
There are 382 kindergartens, 181 elementary schools, 60 junior high schools, 15 senior high schools and four vocational high schools in the regency as of 2021, as well as a special education school in Kurun. The regency has no higher education institutions, and the regency government frequently awards scholarships to students in the region to pursue higher education outside of the regency. The regency has a literacy rate of 99.21%, slightly higher than in neighbouring regions.

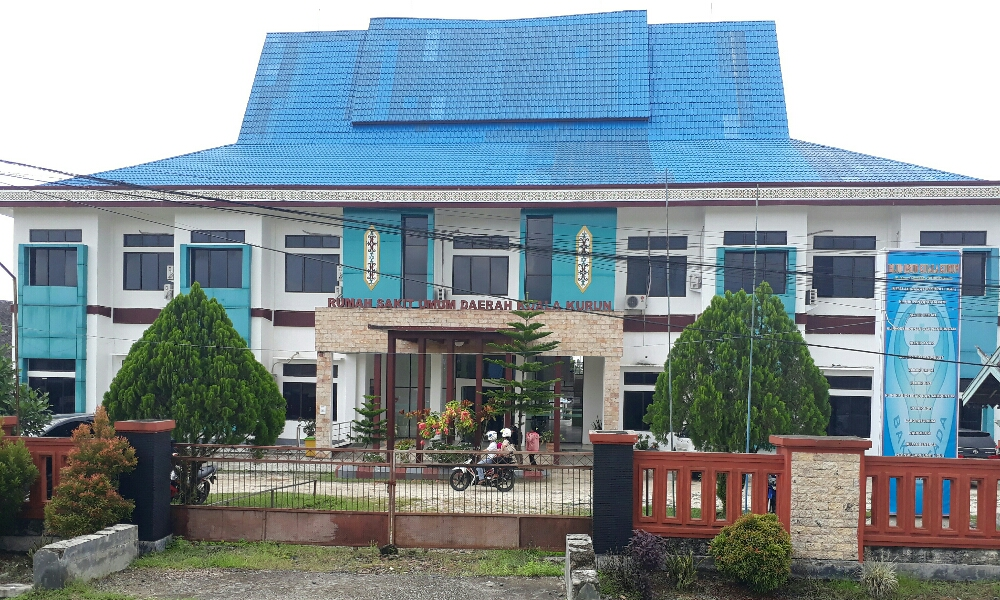
Kuala Kurun Regional Hospital

=== Healthcare ===
There are two hospitals, one polyclinic, 86 puskesmas, and seven pharmacies in the regency. The main hospital of the regency, Kuala Kurun Regional Hospital, is located in the town of Kuala Kurun and classified as C-class hospital by Ministry of Health. The other hospital, Pratama Tumbang Talaken Hospital, is a private hospital located in Manuhing district and classified as D-class. The regency had a life expectancy of 70.40 years in 2021, close to the national average.

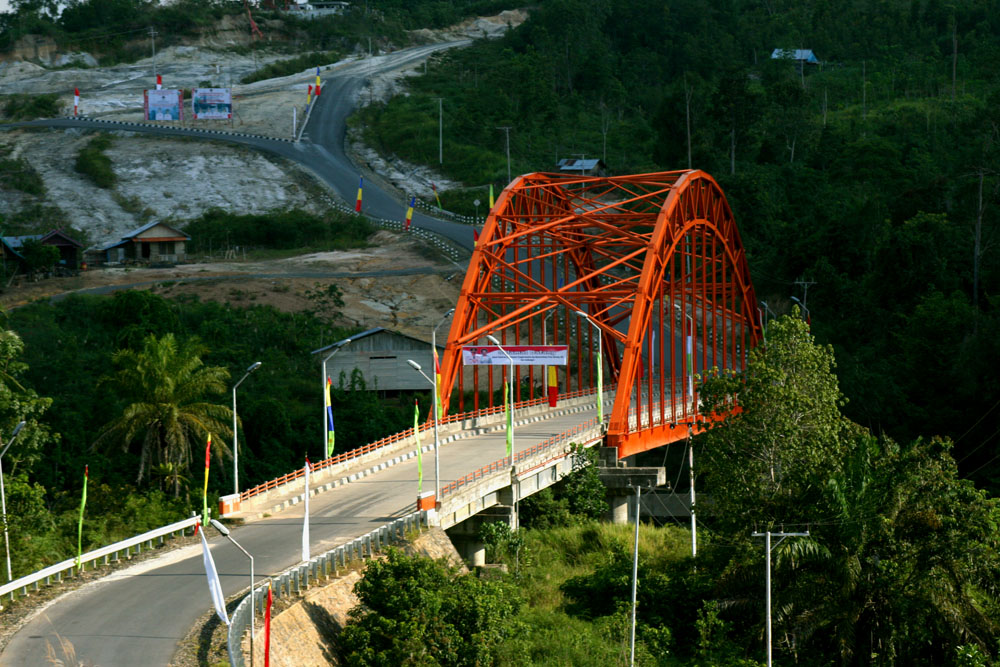
A bridge in Gunung Mas

=== Transportation ===
The regency is served by Sangkalemu Airport in Kuala Kurun, which has weekly scheduled flights to Banjarmasin. The regency has a total road network length of 738.992 km (459.188 mi) and a road connection to Palangka Raya. The road to Palangka Raya is often in poor condition due to its use by overweight vehicles, and frequently experiences traffic congestion.

=== Others ===
The regency has 45 mosques, 252 churches, and 77 Balinese temples. Urban parks are found across the regency, most notably in Kuala Kurun. In Kuala Kurun, the town park has shelter built for street vendors as part of relocation program by the government to reduce their presence in main roads. There are 22 hotels registered in the regency, which more than half is located on Kurun District.
