= Kuala Kurun =

Kuala Kurun Kuala Kurun
- Regency seat
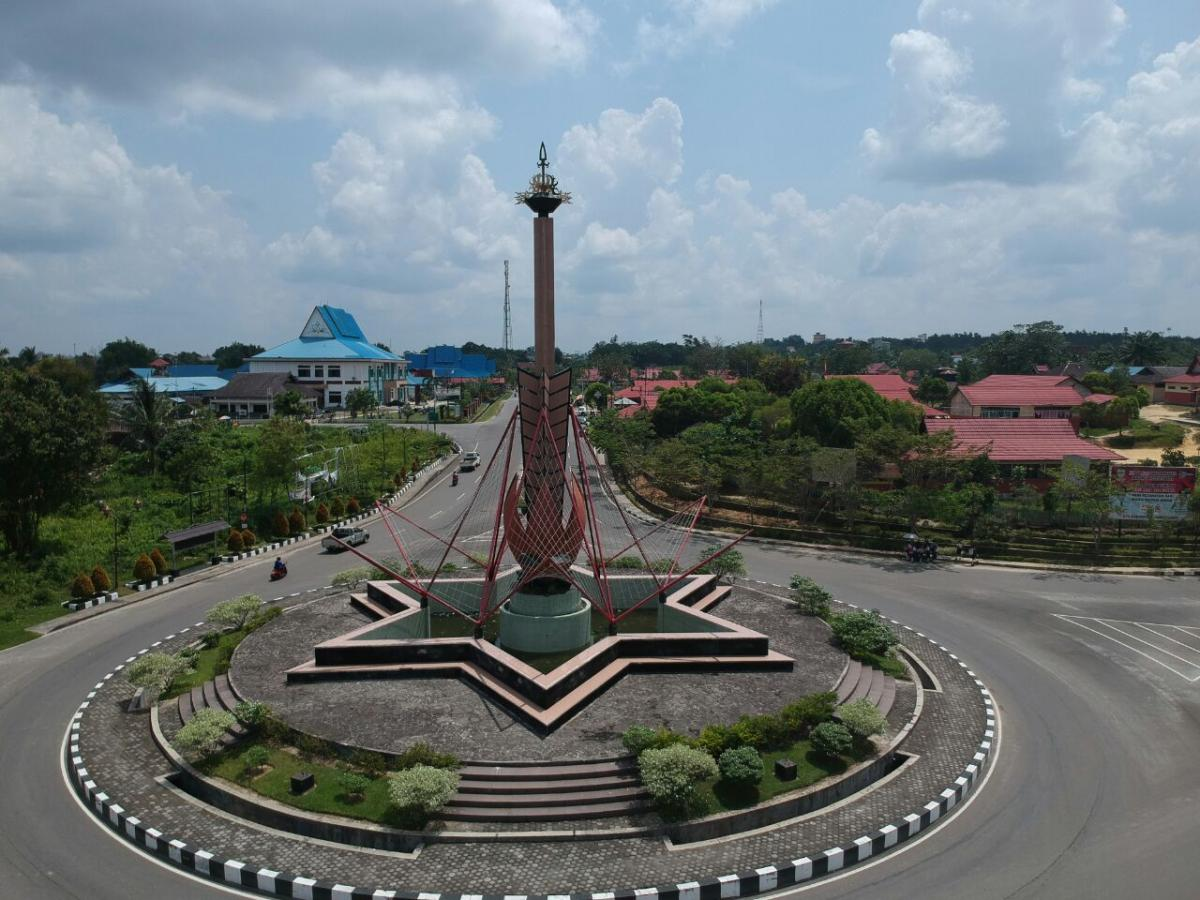
- Duhung Roundabout Monument in Kuala Kurun
- Motto(s): "Habangkalan Penyang Karuhei Tatau"; Ngaju language: "Determination, passion, and effort to be prosperous"
- Location in Central Kalimantan, Indonesia Kuala Kurun (Indonesia)
- Coordinates: 1°06′06″S 113°51′59″E
- Country: Indonesia
- Province: Central Kalimantan
- Regency: Gunung Mas Regency
- District: Kurun

Area
  - Total: 121 km^{2} (47 sq mi)
- Elevation: 73 m (240 ft)

Population (2024)
  - Total: 13,297
  - Density: 106.36/km^{2} (275.5/sq mi)
- Time zone: UTC+7 (Western Indonesian Time)
- Postal code: 74511
- Area code: +62537

Kuala Kurun (abbreviated: KKN), a town (kelurahan) in the district of Kurun, is the regency seat of Gunung Mas Regency and also one of the towns in Central Kalimantan. This town is located 163 km north of Palangka Raya city, the capital of Central Kalimantan Province. The population of this town was 13,297 people as of 2024, while the adjacent Tampang Tumbang Anjir (also rated as a kelurahan) had 7,759 inhabitants.

== Geography ==
Kuala Kurun, Central Kalimantan

Climate chart (precipitation, max. and min. temperature)
J	F	M	A	M	J	J	A	S	O	N	D
341 31 23	293 31 23	341 31 23	327 31 23	281 31 23	220 31 23	171 31 23	145 32 23	174 32 24	270 32 23	344 31 23	335 31 23
- █ Average max. and min. temperatures in °C
- █ Precipitation totals in mm
- Source: Climate-Data.org & BMKG
Imperial conversion
J	F	M	A	M	J	J	A	S	O	N	D
13 88 73	12 88 74	13 88 74	13 88 74	11 88 74	8.7 88 74	6.7 87 73	5.7 89 74	6.9 90 74	11 89 74	14 88 74	13 87 74
- █ Average max. and min. temperatures in °F
- █ Precipitation totals in inches

Kuala Kurun is located 1.101614 S and 113.866383 E. The town is located to the north of Palangka Raya, the provincial capital of Central Kalimantan with the distance from it being about 163 km. The total area of this town is around 121 km² which makes it roughly 1.3% of the total area of Gunung Mas Regency.

Kuala Kurun is crossed by several rivers, but the main one is the Kahayan River which is also one of the most important rivers in Central Kalimantan. The town is situated on quite hilly land to the south of the Schwaner mountains and to the north of the Central Kalimantan lowlands. The altitude of the town is 73 metres above sea level. Due to its adjacency to the equator, this town experiences tropical equatorial climate (Af) with huge amounts of rainfall all year long, constant high humidity and warm-to-hot temperature.

== Demographics ==
The population of Kuala Kurun as at 2024 is about 13,297 inhabitants which represents 34.6% of the population of Kurun district and 8.97% of the entire population of Gunung Mas Regency. The population density of this town is roughly 109.9/km². As of 2021, there are 4,052 households and the average household size is about 3.2 people. The sex ratio of Kuala Kurun is 107 which means there are 107 males to every 100 females.

== Education ==
As of 2021, there are seven primary schools (five public schools & two private school), three middle schools (one public & two private schools), three high schools (one public school & two private schools), and two vocational schools (one public school & one private school).

== Facilities ==
For health facility, Kuala Kurun recently has one general hospital, six pharmacies, and one public health centre. For economic facilities, this town currently has three shopping complexes, two markets, four minimarkets, four banks, and twelve restaurants. Kuala Kurun has also 35 religious facilities, those are fourteen Islamic religious facilities, twenty Christian churches, and one Hindu/Kaharingan temple. This town is also served by Sangkalemu Kuala Kurun Airport which is located in the neighboring town of Tampang Tumbang Anjir.
