= Kurun =

Indonesian district

Kurun District Kecamatan Kurun
- District
- Location within Kalimantan Location within Indonesia
- Coordinates: 1°12′52.02″S 113°51′54.43″E
- Country: Indonesia
- Province: Central Kalimantan
- Regency: Gunung Mas Regency

Area
  - Total: 770.78 km^{2} (297.60 sq mi)

Population (2025)
  - Total: 38,407
  - Density: 49.829/km^{2} (129.06/sq mi)
- Time zone: UTC+7 (WIB)
- Website: https://kurun.gunungmaskab.go.id

Kurun is an administrative district (kecamatan) in Gunung Mas Regency, Central Kalimantan, Indonesia. Kuala Kurun, the capital of Gunung Mas Regency is located in this district.

Kurun District consists of 15 administrative villages: including two urban villages (kelurahan) - Kuala Kurun (with 13,297 inhabitants as at mid 2024) and the adjacent Tampang Tumbang Anjir (with 7,759 inhabitants as at mid 2024) - plus 13 rural villages (desa).

== Demography ==
In 2025, Kurun District had a population of 38,407. By religion, the majority of residents are Christian, comprising 69.17 percent of the population (65.07 percent Protestant and 4.10 percent Catholic), most of whom are of Dayak ethnicity. Muslims make up 26.25 percent of the population, Hindus 4.58 percent, and Buddhists less than 0.01 percent.

== Communications ==
Cellular phone coverage in Kurun District is uneven. Several villages such as Pilang Munduk, Tumbang Hakau and Kuala Kurun have a strong mobile signal, while others including Tewang Pajangan, Tumbang Tambirah, Tumbang Manyangan and Penda Pilang are recorded as having a weak mobile and internet signal.

== Education ==
In 2025, villages in Kurun District had access to a range of educational facilities from primary to senior secondary level, but no higher-education institutions.
