= St. Mary's Cathedral, Palangkaraya =

St. Mary's Cathedral
- Katedral Santa Maria
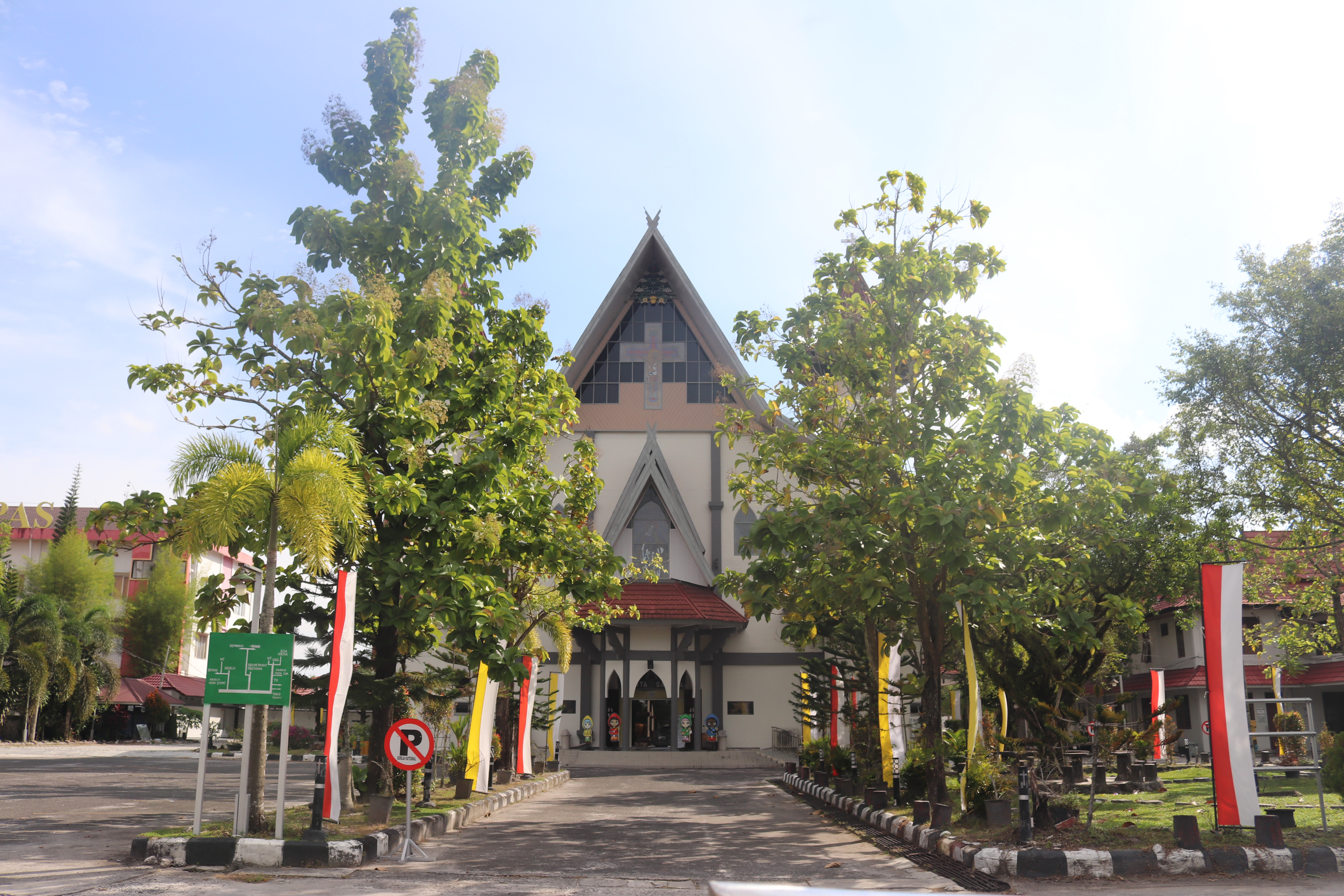
- St. Mary's Cathedral
- Location: Palangkaraya
- Country: Indonesia
- Denomination: Roman Catholic Church

The St. Mary's Cathedral (Indonesian: Katedral Santa Maria) also called Palangkaraya Cathedral is a Catholic Church located in the city of Palangka Raya (also written Palangkaraya) in the province of Central Kalimantan to the south of the island of Borneo in Indonesia.

The cathedral church building used today was inaugurated on March 21, 1999 by the then Apostolic Administrator of the Diocese of Palangkaraya Monsignor Florentius sidot. Three parishes depend on the cathedral: St. Joseph Parish created on April 17, 1987, St. Arnold Janssen Parish, created in 1985 and the Parish of Jesus Good Shepherd, created on August 15, 2010.

The temple follows the Roman or Latin rite and is the mother church of the Diocese of Palangkaraya (Dioecesis Palangkaraiensis or Keuskupan Palangkaraya) that was created in 1993 through the bull "Venerabiles Fratres" of Pope John Paul II.

It is under the pastoral responsibility of Bishop Aloysius Maryadi Sutrisnaatmaka.

== See also ==
- Roman Catholicism in Indonesia
- St. Mary's Cathedral
