= Fairid Naparin =

Indonesian politician

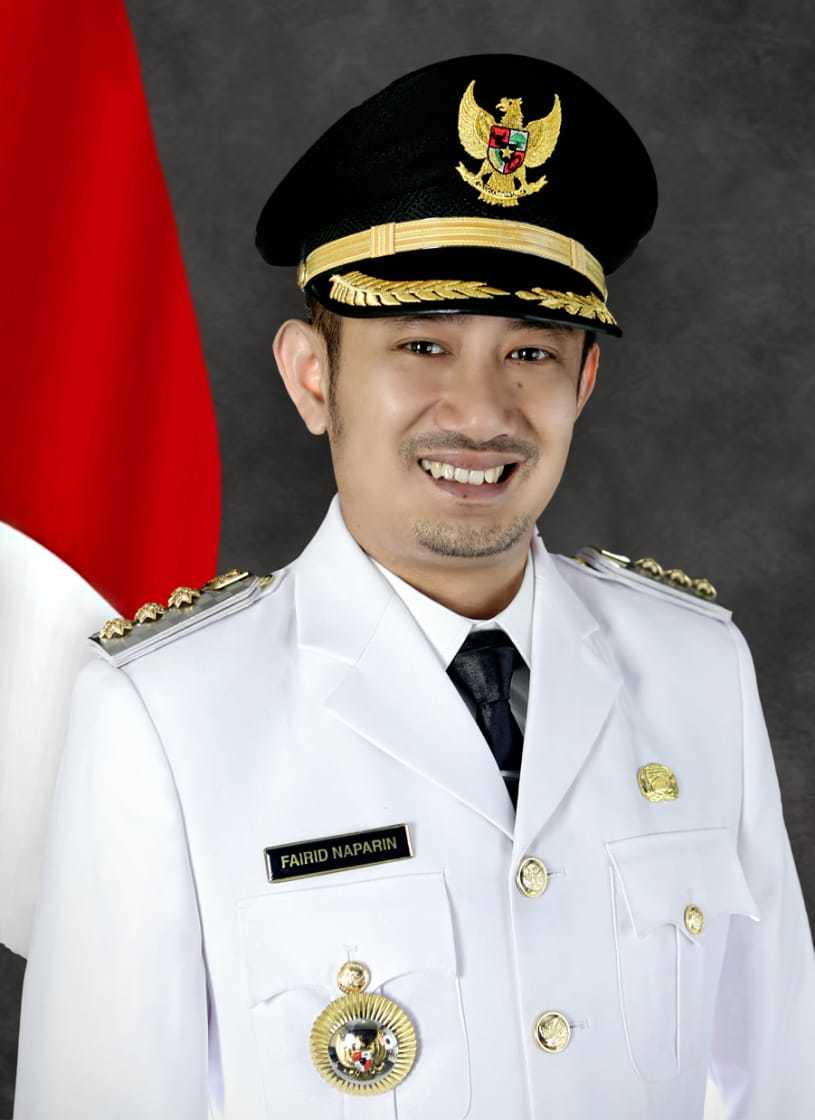

3rd Mayor of Palangka Raya
- Incumbent
- Assumed office 24 September 2018
- Preceded by: Riban Satia

Personal details
- Born: 28 August 1985 (age 40) Banjarmasin, South Kalimantan
- Party: Golkar Party
- Occupation: Politician

Fairid Naparin is an Indonesian politician and incumbent mayor of Palangka Raya city since 2018. He was elected on 24 September 2018 during 2018 Indonesian local elections.
