= Palangka Raya =

Capital and largest city of Central Kalimantan, Indonesia

- City
- City of Palangka Raya; Kota Palangka Raya
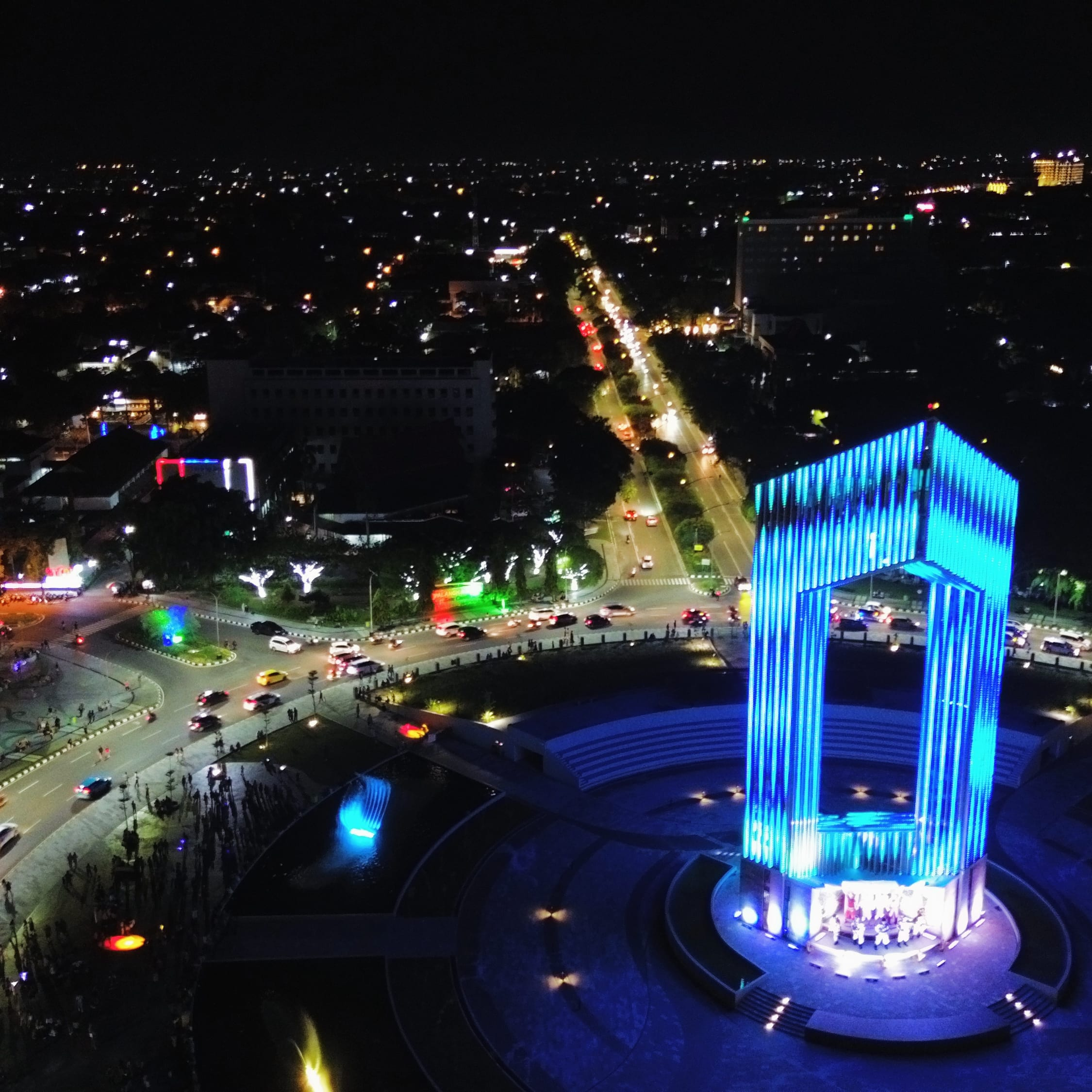
- Night view of the city and the big roundabout (Bundaran Besar)

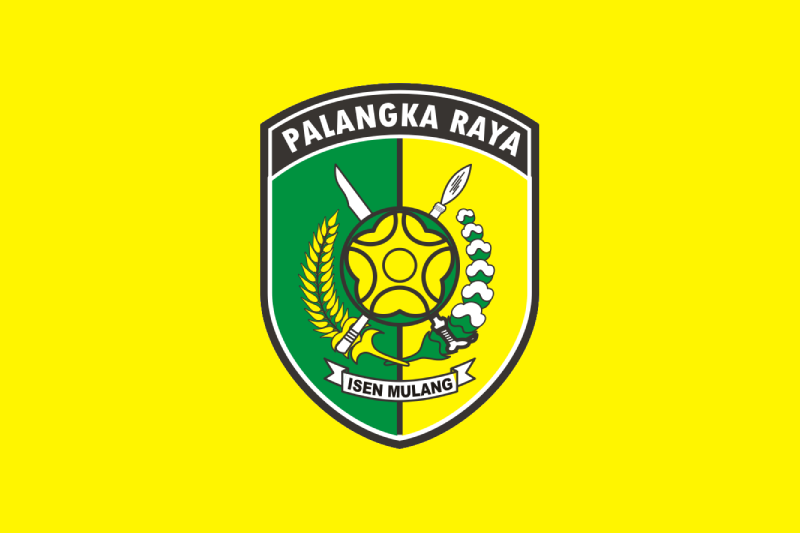
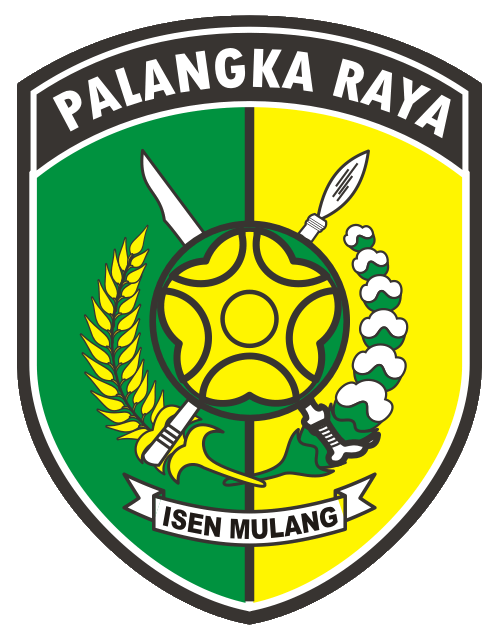
- Flag Coat of arms

- Location within Central Kalimantan

- Location in Kalimantan and Indonesia Palangka Raya (Indonesia)
- Coordinates: 2°12′36″S 113°55′12″E
- Country: Indonesia
- Province: Central Kalimantan
- Founded: 17 July 1957

Government
  - Mayor: Fairid Naparin (Golkar)
  - Vice Mayor: Achmad Zaini
  - Legislature: Palangka Raya Regional House of Representatives

Area
  - Total: 2,853.12 km^{2} (1,101.60 sq mi)
- Elevation: 5 m (16 ft)

Population (mid 2025 estimate)
  - Total: 318,247
  - Density: 111.544/km^{2} (288.896/sq mi)
- Time zone: UTC+7 (Western Indonesia Time)
- Area code: (+62) 536
- Vehicle registration: KH
- HDI (2022): ▲0.816 (Very High)
- Website: palangkaraya.go.id

Palangka Raya or Palangkaraya is the capital and largest city of the Indonesian province of Central Kalimantan. The city is situated between the Kahayan and the Sabangau rivers on the island of Borneo. As of the 2020 census, the city has a population of 293,500; the official estimate as at mid 2025 was 318,247 (comprising 161,314 males and 156,933 females). Palangka Raya is the largest city by land area in Indonesia (approximately four times the size of Jakarta); however, most of the area is forested (particularly in the northern districts of Rakumpit and Bukit Batu) including protected forests, nature conservation areas, and Tangkiling Forest.

The city is the center of economic, governance, and education of Central Kalimantan province. It is a relatively new city, founded from a small Dayak village of Pahandut in 1957. The city was planned from scratch and the construction was assisted by the Soviet military due to Sukarno's relation to Eastern Bloc at the time. Despite relatively developed infrastructure and high Human Development Index rating, the city suffers from environmental problems such as haze, forest fires, and floods.

== Etymology ==
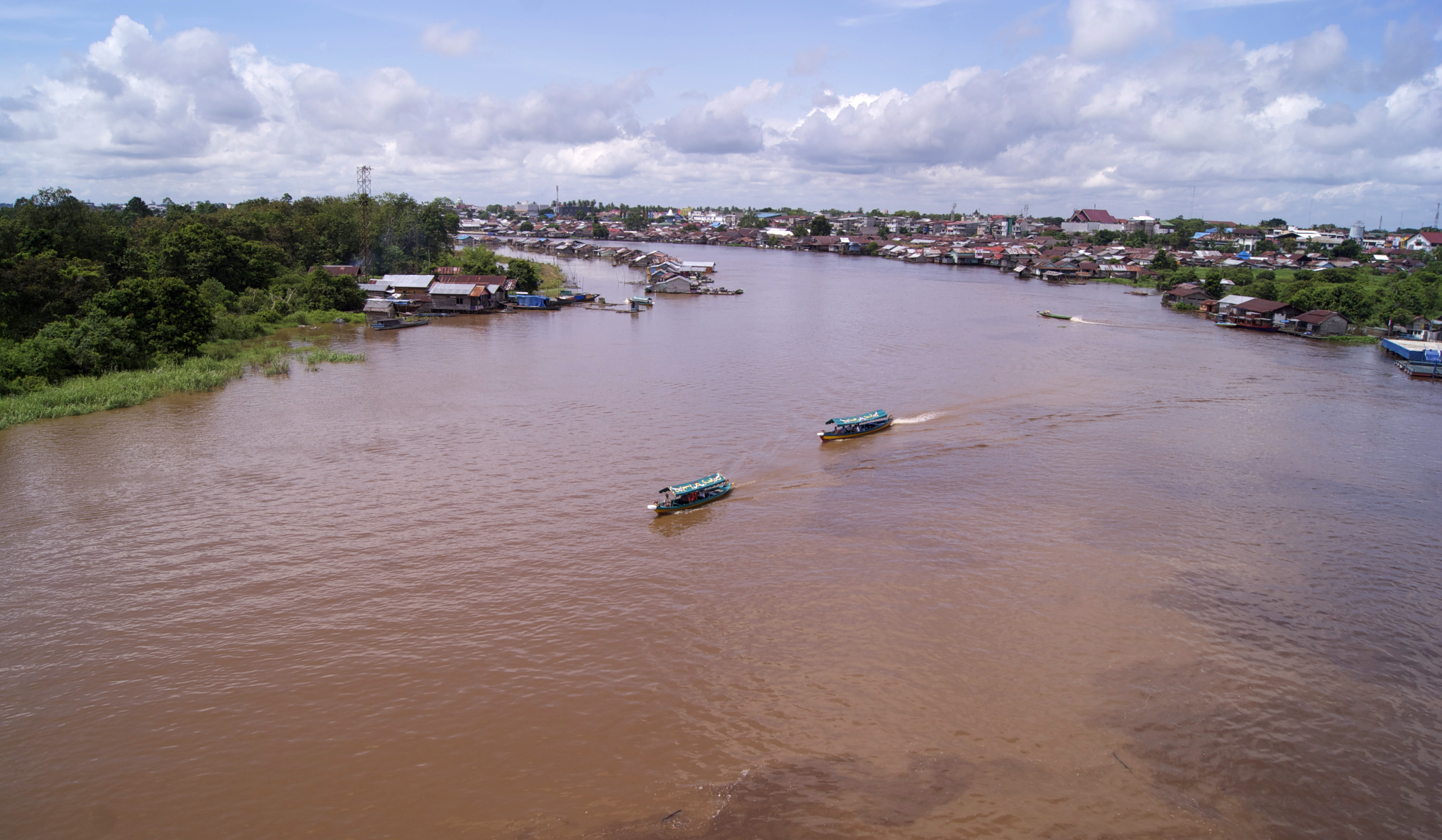
The Kahayan River through the city of Palangka Raya.

The name Palangka Raya is a combination of two words from two languages: palangka (Dayak Ngaju), meaning sacred site, and raya (Malay), meaning vast; therefore, Palangka Raya means a vast sacred site. The city stands on the site of a small Dayak village called Pahandut that was surrounded by rainforest.

According to a local legend, Bayuh and Kambang, a married Dayak couple, founded the village because the surrounding region was not suitable for building a house, as its soil was made up of peat and swamps. Over time, the village grew into a small Dayak outpost with its surroundings being used for farming and as a small plantation. At first, it was believed that the name of the village was Dukuh Bayuh. Dukuh Bayuh was thought to be derived from Eka Badukuh, meaning "place to settle" in Dayak (with daily usage called Dukuh ain Bayuh, shortened Dukuh Bayuh). Pahandut on the other hand, according to local stories, was a respected elder and cultural figure from the village. He was often called Bapa Handut, which literally means Mr. Handut. Handut died of illness, and to respect his death as an important figure from the village, it was named Pahandut.

== History ==
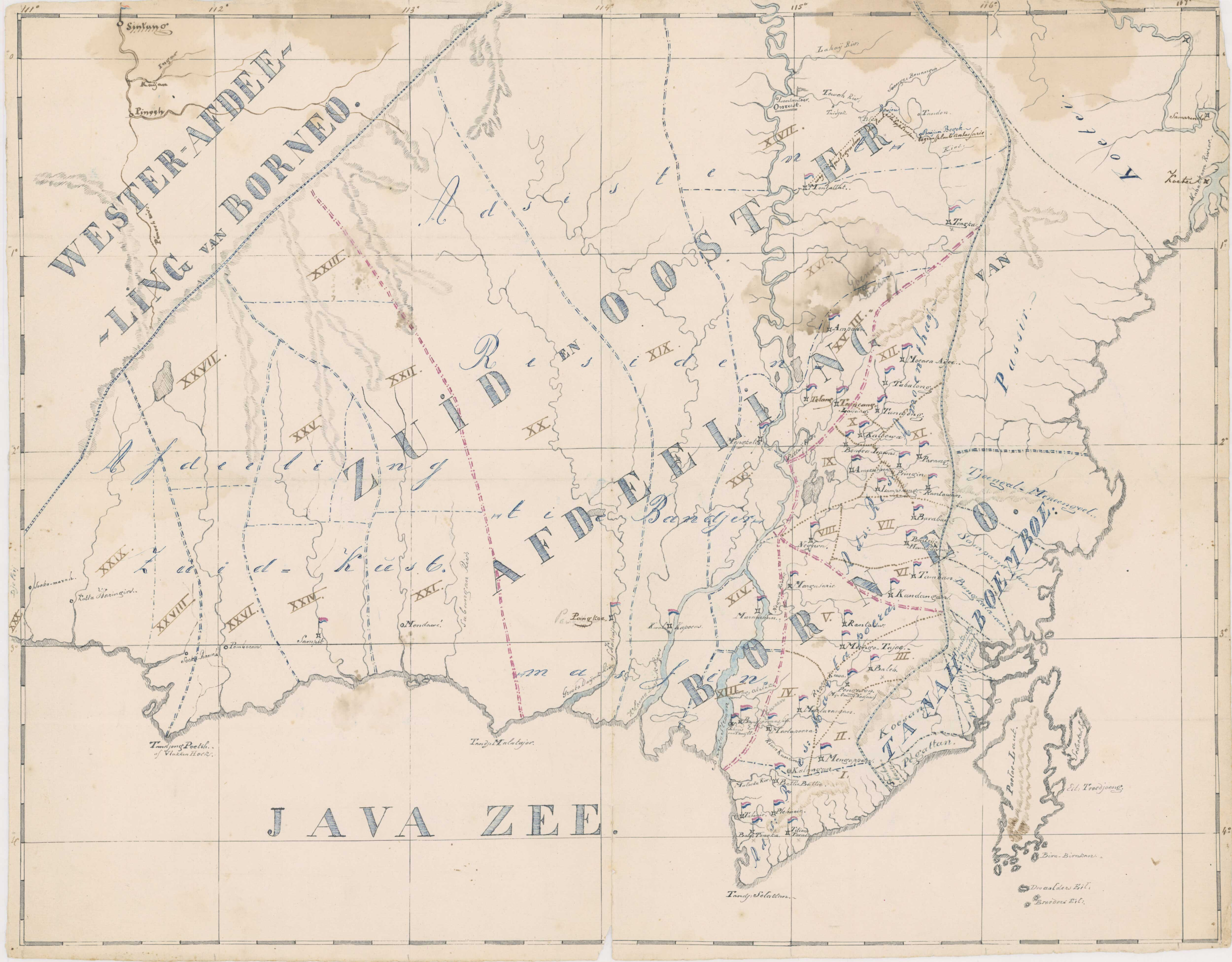
Map of Kalimantan under Dutch colonial rule

=== Colonial Era ===
According to documents from the Dutch East Indies, Pahandut village's existence was discovered by Zacharias Hartman, a Dutch explorer, on his journey around Kahayan and Kapuas River in 1823. This conflicts with the statements that claim the village was previously known under the Sultanate of Banjar, which became a Dutch protectorate under an agreement with Sultan Tahmidullah II in 1787. The region was leased to the Dutch East Indies by Sultan Sulaiman in 1817, and was ceded by Sultan Adam of Banjar under a contract signed on 4 May 1826, written in Dutch on second point which reads in English as:

The Fifth article of the contract is hereby declared null and void and shall be replaced by the following, His Highness the Sultan Sleman, relinquishes in full ownership to his entire island of Tatas and the Kween, to the left bank of the Antasjan Kecil, Lewai, Jelai, Sintang, Takjanjauw, Pagatan, and the island of Pulau Laut, Kotta Ringin, Passir, Kute, Barouw and all their dependencies. His Highness furthermore cedes one half of the lands, Pamboean, Mandawi, Sampit, the large and small Dajak, the Becompaij, and Doesoen. On the other hand, the Government will cede half of the lands that the Government has taken possession of at the request of His Highness, and which have belonged to Mr Hare. In particular Molucco, Laut, the Kuroe, Leanangan and all their dependencies up to Tanjong Selatan and to the boundaries of Pagatan and Pasir.

It was integrated into Zuid Ooster Afdeeling in accordance with Bêsluit van den Minister van Staat, Gouverneur-Generaal van Nederlandsch-Indie No. 8, 27 August 1849. ("Decision of the Minister of State, Governor-General of Netherlands-India No. 8) In 1898, it became part of Afdeeling Dajaklandeen in accordance with Staatblad 1898 No. 178. (Official Gazette 1898 No. 178) Dutch rule remained weak in this region and several revolts from native rulers took place, such as under Raden Djaija and Pambakal Sulil in 1849. The region saw a conflict over succession and against Dutch rule called the Banjarmasin War. There has been debate about whether the fighting constituted one war or two, with the potential auxiliary war called the "Barito War". The village of Pahandut was also used by German missionaries as an outpost for the region around the Kahayan River. In the Tumbang Anoi Peacemaking Agreement between Dayak tribes in 1894 to end the practice of headhunting, it was noted that Pahandut village consisted of eight longhouses and was inhabited by around 40 families.

Later, during Indonesian National Revolution, there were armed clash within the region between Indonesian nationalists under unit TNI/MN 1001 and Royal Netherlands East Indies Army on 17 January 1946.

=== Establishment ===
The province of Central Kalimantan was established on 23 May 1957. At first, the capital for the Central Kalimantan province was not agreed and it was debated where it should be located. R.T.A. Milono, acting governor of Central Kalimantan, discussed the matter with several native organizations and cultural figures from the region. This however evoked tension from several native tribes and organizations that each wanted their own region to be chosen as capital. On 23 January 1957, a committee to discuss the matter was created, consisting mostly of Dayak cultural figures, in addition to military figures such as Tjilik Riwut and Dutch-descendant architect D.A.W. Van Der Pijl who also later designed the then-proposed new capital of South Kalimantan, Banjarbaru. From the committee's meeting, it was decided that Pahandut village would be the capital to avoid cultural association within tribes in the province, hence avoiding conflicts. At the time, the village only had an estimated population of around 900.

The first pillar in the development of Palangka Raya City was erected by Sukarno, the President of the Republic of Indonesia, on 17 July 1957, marking the inauguration of the monument to the provincial capital of Central Kalimantan in Pahandut. Then, in accordance with Law No. 21 of 1958, Pahandut was renamed to Palangka Raya City, maintaining its status as the provincial seat. The construction of the city was directly led by Tjilik Riwut, whom by then had become governor of the Central Kalimantan province. The city was claimed by him to be "free from colonial legacies". At first however, he was rumoured to be insane by residents of the province for trying to build a city on top of nothingness. It was officially made the capital of Central Kalimantan on 1 January 1960, relocated from its temporary seat in Banjarmasin. By late 1962, the city had by this point largely finished construction of its basic infrastructure such as schools, government offices, inner city roads, and residential areas, with an estimated 500 buildings having been constructed.

On 23 July 1965, it gained official city status (kotapraja) and formed its own municipal government. The city was constructed with the assistance of Soviet military, especially regarding road construction due to the terrain of the region - dominated by swamps and peat. The road which today is named Jl. Tjilik Riwut, was previously planned to be constructed from the city to Pangkalan Bun and Sampit. This however, was never realized due to 30 September Movement, coup d'état against Sukarno, and subsequent communist purge that followed. Many local workers resigned and abandoned their work due to fear of being accused as communist and the road construction stopped at the town of Tangkiling.

=== Recent history ===
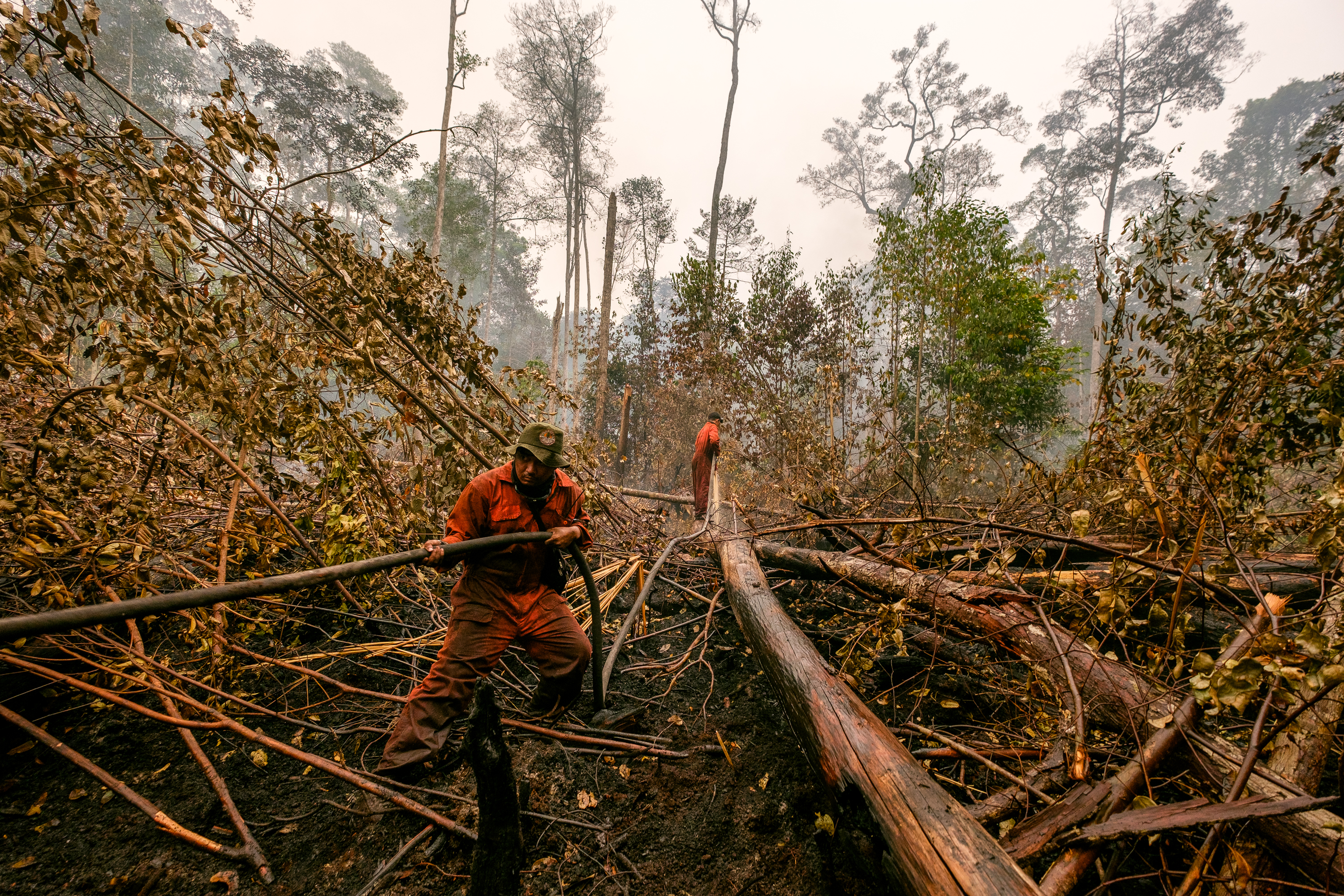
Firefighters during a forest fire in Sebangau National Park

Surrounded by forests and peat land, the city can be heavily affected by haze in the dry season, notably in 2015 and 2019. In 2015, the haze made the sky look yellow and affected road traffic.

In 2019, the haze caused several people to evacuate the city. Forest fires and haze have been annual threats to the city and the city government formed a special agency to deal with forest fires and haze. The city government constructed 23 canals and three retention basins around the city to deal with threat of forest fires in 2019.

The city was a candidate to become the new Indonesian capital until the 2019 announcement that the new capital will be partly in Penajam North Paser Regency and partly in Kutai Kartanegara Regency, both in East Kalimantan.

== Geography ==
Palangka Raya borders Gunung Mas Regency to the north, Katingan Regency to the west, and Pulang Pisau Regency to the south and east. The area's soil consists mostly of peat and alluvium in its southern part and podzol on the northern part of the city. Overall, podzol soil dominates the city soil with 218,486 out of 285,312 hectares of city's landscape. Most of the city's topography is flat, with a general slope of less than 40 percent. Palangka Raya is mostly located around 35 meters above sea level.

10,105.34 hectares of land in the city is designated as protected forest, while 90,722.15 hectares are production forest. In addition, there are also 63,816.40 hectares of national park, 1,771.13 hectares of nature reserve, and 726.20 hectares of preserved nature.

=== Climate ===
Palangka Raya has a tropical rainforest climate (Köppen Af) with heavy rainfall year-round. According to Meteorology, Climatology, and Geophysical Agency, the average temperature in Palangka Raya is 27.28 °C (81.10 °F). The minimum temperature recorded is 21.4 °C (70.5 °F), and the maximum 35.2 °C (95.4 °F). Humidity is between 65 and 95 percent with a yearly average of 82.89 percent. Wind usually flows between 2 and 22 knots (3.7 and 40.7 km/h; 2.3 and 25.3 mph), with a yearly average of 5.3 knots (9.8 km/h; 6.1 mph). Increased wind speed is expected between August and November.

Climate data for Palangka Raya (Tjilik Riwut Airport) (1991–2020 normals)
Month	Jan	Feb	Mar	Apr	May	Jun	Jul	Aug	Sep	Oct	Nov	Dec	Year
Mean daily maximum °C (°F)	32.3 (90.1)	32.4 (90.3)	32.5 (90.5)	32.3 (90.1)	32.8 (91.0)	32.5 (90.5)	32.4 (90.3)	32.7 (90.9)	32.8 (91.0)	32.8 (91.0)	32.6 (90.7)	32.4 (90.3)	32.5 (90.5)
Daily mean °C (°F)	26.8 (80.2)	26.9 (80.4)	27.0 (80.6)	26.9 (80.4)	27.4 (81.3)	27.0 (80.6)	26.7 (80.1)	26.8 (80.2)	27.0 (80.6)	27.1 (80.8)	27.0 (80.6)	26.9 (80.4)	27.0 (80.6)
Mean daily minimum °C (°F)	23.2 (73.8)	23.3 (73.9)	23.4 (74.1)	23.8 (74.8)	23.8 (74.8)	23.3 (73.9)	22.6 (72.7)	22.3 (72.1)	22.7 (72.9)	23.2 (73.8)	23.4 (74.1)	23.3 (73.9)	23.2 (73.8)
Average rainfall mm (inches)	296.2 (11.66)	254.9 (10.04)	332.0 (13.07)	312.0 (12.28)	214.7 (8.45)	166.8 (6.57)	104.4 (4.11)	86.8 (3.42)	117.7 (4.63)	193.9 (7.63)	318.1 (12.52)	320.7 (12.63)	2,718.2 (107.02)
Average rainy days (≥ 1.0 mm)	19.9	16.6	19.8	21.3	15.5	13.5	10.6	9.2	10.0	13.4	19.7	21.7	191.2
Mean monthly sunshine hours	124.2	115.8	128.4	142.3	164.6	141.6	167.6	161.7	140.8	130.0	130.7	126.8	1,674.5
Source: World Meteorological Organization

== Demographics ==
Population growth was 2.84% as of 2019, with sex ratio of 106 males per 100 females. As of 2020, the city's population is dominated by younger demographics above the age of 15, making up an estimated 222,285 people of reproductive age. There were estimated to be 199,140 Muslims, 73,641 Protestants, 5,511 Catholics, 3,453 Hindus, 485 Buddhists, 8 Confucians, and 27 followers of other religions such as folk religions. The population of age 20 – 24 keeps increasing; this is thought to be caused by students from other regions in Central Kalimantan moving to the city to pursue higher education. In addition, the city has the highest human development index and standard of living in the entire Kalimantan, making it an attractive destination for migrants. Majority of city population are Dayak ethnic, accounts more than half of city's population. Other ethnics such as Banjar, Malay, Buginese, and Javanese also exist in the city. More than half of the city population are from Jekan Raya District.

== Economy ==
Economic growth was 7% in 2019, above the national average, and inflation rate in the same year was 0.85%. Unemployment rate was 6% in 2020. The service sector is the largest contributor to city's gross regional product, contributing 28.36% of it in 2020, in contrast with neighboring regions which still rely mainly on agriculture and extraction. The next largest contributor to city's economy in 2020 was trade, with figure of 17.85%, followed by construction with 11.06%. The financial and banking sector provides around 6% of the city's economy. Agriculture, forestry, plantation, and fishery all combined contributed to 2.45% of the city's economy in 2019. Crop yields decreased rapidly from year-on-year; production of red chili dropped from 2,864 tons in 2018 to just more than 200 tons in 2020. Fish catch also decreased by 19.8% from 2018 to 2019. Tourism is a small but growing sector, with 389,235 domestic tourists and 3,865 foreign tourists visiting the city in 2019. The city government owns 2.47% of the shares of Central Kalimantan Bank together with provincial government.

There are 56,430 small and medium enterprises in 2017, from which 72% are on trade, restaurant, and hotel sector. On the same year, there are more than 250 registered cooperatives in the city.

== Governance ==
=== Administrative districts ===
Prior to decentralization in 2001, Palangka Raya had two administrative districts, Pahandut and Bukit Batu. Palangka Raya now consists of five administrative districts, tabulated below with their areas and population totals from the 2010 Census and from the 2020 Census, together with the official estimates as of mid-2025. The table also includes the number of administrative subdistricts in each district (all classed as urban kelurahan), and its post codes.

Kode Wilayah	Name of District (kecamatan)	Area in km^{2}	Pop'n Census 2010	Pop'n Census 2020	Pop'n Estimate mid 2025	No. of kelurahan	Post codes
62.71.01	Pahandut	119.73	77,211	97,054	106,686	6	73111
62.71.04	Sabangau	640.74	14,306	24,048	28,648	6	73113 & 73114
62.71.03	Jekan Raya	387.54	114,559	154,363	163,685	4	73111, 73112 & 73118
62.71.02	Bukit Batu	603.15	11,932	14,014	14,962	7	73221 - 73226
62.71.05	Rakumpit	1,101.98	2,954	3,978	4,266	7	73227 - 73229
	Totals	2,853.12	220,962	293,457	318,247	30	

The districts are sub-divided into 30 urban subdistricts (kelurahan), with their areas and 2023 populations as set out below:

Kode Wilayah	Name of District (kecamatan)	Name of Village (kelurahan)	Area in km^{2}	Pop'n Estimate mid 2023
62.71.01.1001	Pahandut	Pahandut	8.20	27,373
62.71.01.1002	Pahandut	Panarung	23.10	32,675
62.71.01.1003	Pahandut	Langkai	8.88	30,079
62.71.01.1004	Pahandut	Tumbang Rungan	23.30	882
62.71.01.1005	Pahandut	Pahandut Seberang	7.95	5,692
62.71.01.1006	Pahandut	Tanjung Pinang	48.30	5,492
62.71.02.1001	Bukit Batu	Marang	128.64	1,162
62.71.02.1002	Bukit Batu	Tumbang Tahai	60.91	3,110
62.71.02.1003	Bukit Batu	Banturung	57.78	3,790
62.71.02.1004	Bukit Batu	Tangkiling	83.87	3,326
62.71.02.1005	Bukit Batu	Sei Gohong	97.91	1,718
62.71.02.1006	Bukit Batu	Kanarakan	100.61	379
62.71.02.1007	Bukit Batu	Habaring Hurung	73.43	1,073
62.71.03.1001	Jekan Raya	Palangka	22.49	46,504
62.71.03.1002	Jekan Raya	Menteng	31.27	51,963
62.71.03.1003	Jekan Raya	Bukit Tunggal	274.15	56,380
62.71.03.1004	Jekan Raya	Petuk Katimpun	59.63	3,763
62.71.04.1001	Sabangau	Bereng Bengkel	19.43	1,173
62.71.04.1002	Sabangau	Kalampangan	42.29	4,963
62.71.04.1003	Sabangau	Kereng Bangkirai	323.45	12,806
62.71.04.1004	Sabangau	Kameloh Baru	63.68	828
62.71.04.1005	Sabangau	Danau Tundai	40.74	261
62.71.04.1006	Sabangau	Sabaru	151.15	6,712
62.71.05.1001	Rakumpit	Petuk Bukit	299.98	1,053
62.71.05.1002	Rakumpit	Panjehang	39.44	247
62.71.05.1003	Rakumpit	Petuk Barunai	155.69	909
62.71.05.1004	Rakumpit	Mungku Baru	193.36	747
62.71.05.1005	Rakumpit	Pager	197.73	485
62.71.05.1006	Rakumpit	Gaung Baru	53.77	289
62.71.05.1007	Rakumpit	Bukit Sua	162.01	270

== Local Government ==
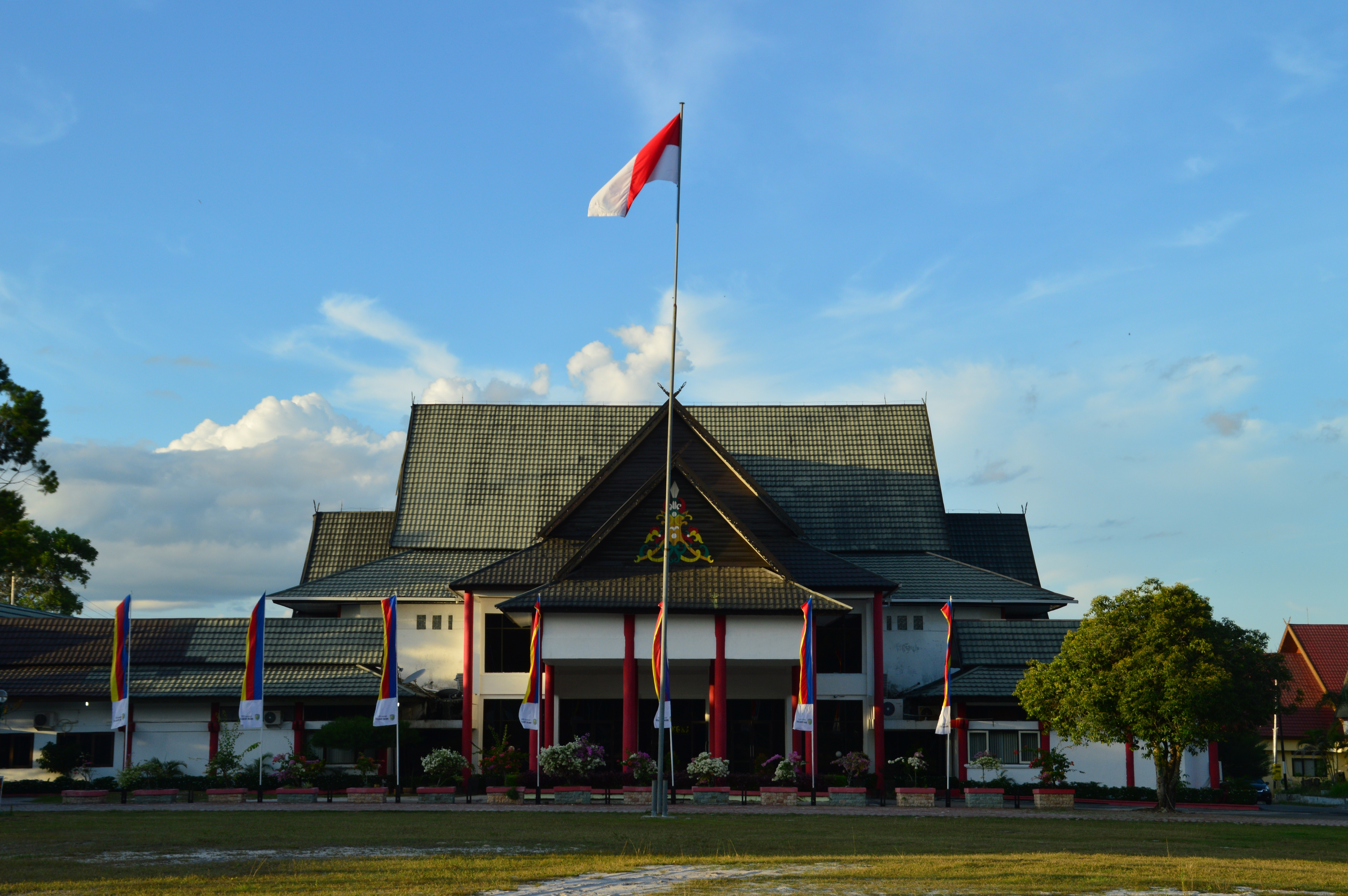
Palangka Raya city hall building

As with all Indonesian cities, it is a second-level administrative division run by a mayor and a vice mayor together with the city parliament, and it is equivalent to a regency. Executive power is vested in the mayor and vice mayor, while legislative duties are vested in the local parliament. The mayor, vice mayor, and parliament members are directly elected by the people of the city in an election. Heads of districts are appointed by the mayor on the recommendation of the city secretary.

=== Politics ===
Palangka Raya is part of 1st Central Kalimantan electoral district at the provincial level. That electoral district, which includes Katingan Regency and Gunung Mas Regency, has 10 representatives out of 45 in the provincial parliament. At the city level, Palangka Raya is divided into three electoral districts. City parliament in total has 30 representatives that are democratically elected by people of the city in an election. Jekan Raya District is divided into two electoral districts, with Jekan Raya A consisting of Bukit Tunggal kelurahan and Petuk Katimpun kelurahan, and Jekan Raya B consisting of Menteng kelurahan and Palangka kelurahan. The most recent election was in 2024 and the next one will be in 2029. As Palangka Raya is also the provincial capital, it also has the governor's office and the provincial parliament of Central Kalimantan located in the city.

Electoral District	Region	Representatives
Palangka Raya City 1st	Bukit Batu District; Jekan Raya A (Bukit Tunggal kelurahan, Petuk Katimpun kelurahan); Rakumpit District	8
Palangka Raya City 2nd	Jekan Raya B (Menteng kelurahan, Palangka kelurahan)	10
Palangka Raya City 3rd	Pahandut District; Sabangau District	12
Total		30

=== Military ===
The city is headquarter of Kodim 1016/Palangka Raya inside Korem 102/Panju Pujung, which was historically under Kodam XI/Tambun Bungai but currently is under Kodam XII/Tanjungpura. The unit was created on 9 December 1975 and formalized on 23 March 1976. The unit has one raider battalion attached to it as of 2021, which is Raider Battalion 631st Antang Elang.

== Culture and entertainment ==
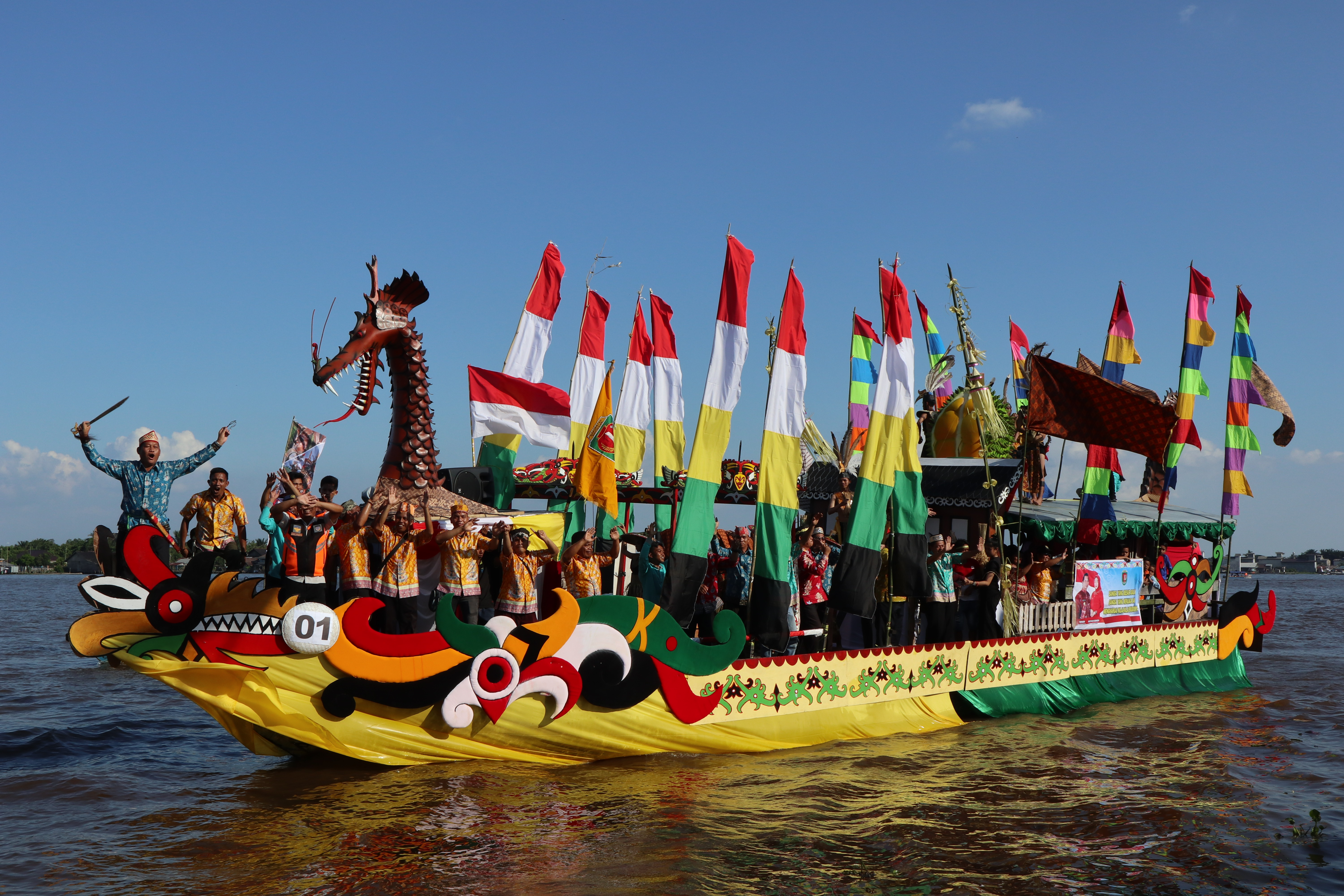
Decorated boat competition, part of Isen Mulang Festival

=== Entertainment ===
Several malls exist in the city, such as Palangka Raya Mall, Lippo Plaza Palangka Raya (Formerly Mega Town Square), and Duta Mall Palangka Raya. Palangka Raya Mall is integrated with a hotel named Hotel Neo, which has an interior connection to the mall. Construction of the Palangka Raya Trade Center was halted in 2019 because of a land dispute and followed by Supreme Court of Indonesia's rejection of the prosecutor's dispute.

In 2019 a new mall called Duta Mall Palangka Raya began construction, and after five years of construction opened on October of 2025. The mall is owned by the Govindo Group which also owns Duta Mall Banjarmasin. The mall has more than 200+ shops and restaurants including well known brands such as A&W, Crocs. The mall will also included a Hotel FUGO which is currently under construction and is expected to open in 2026.

An exterior shot of Duta Mall Palangka Raya that opened in October of 2025

According to city media center, Palangka Raya has 63 city parks as of January 2020. These parks scattered in Pahandut, Jekan Raya, and Sebangau District. Cultural events are often held on city park beside Kahayan Bridge. The Sebangau District is home to Sebangau National Park, which was established in 2004. The Balanga Museum has collections focused on history of Dayak people and their culture. It was built in 1973 and inaugurated in 1990.

=== Festival ===
The preservation of Dayak culture has been promoted by the provincial government through cultural events and festivals, including the annual Isen Mulang Festival, usually held in May and June. Other festivals were later held in 2020 with support of Ministry of Tourism, including those celebrating Malay cultures.

=== Sport ===
Palangka Raya is home to Kalteng Putra F.C, which as of 2021 competes in Liga 2 after degradation from Liga 1. Its home stadium is Tuah Pahoe Stadium, located in Jekan Raya District. It was expanded in 2019 to increase stadium's capacity, in addition to facility upgrades.

== Infrastructure ==
=== Education ===
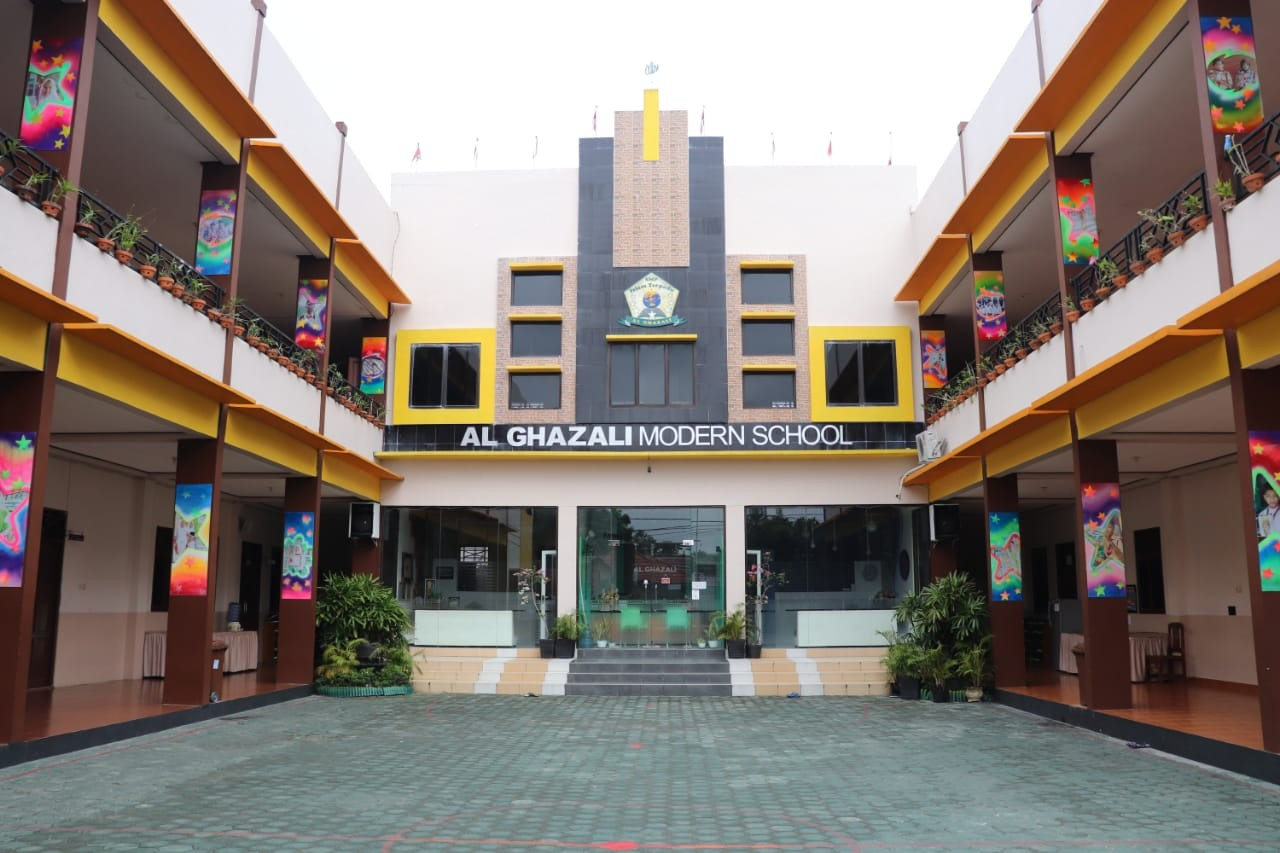
A junior highschool in Palangka Raya

There are 134 kindergartens, 146 elementary schools, 60 junior highschools, 34 senior highschools, and 16 vocational highschools in the city. Palangka Raya is a home to number of universities and higher education institutions. University of Palangka Raya is the only public university in the city and the most notable one in the city. Other higher education institutions are Palangka Raya Christian University, Tampung Penyang Hindu Institute, Palangka Raya Muhammadiyah University, among many others. School enrollment rate as of 2020 was 99%.

=== Healthcare ===
Palangka Raya city has eight hospitals (including two maternity hospitals), five polyclinics, 35 puskesmas, and eight pharmacy. One of the biggest public hospital, Doris Sylvanus Regional Hospital, is owned by provincial government and has been rated by Ministry of Health as B-class hospital. Another public hospital, Palangka Raya Regional Hospital, is owned by city government, and has been classified as D-class. Notable private hospital companies such as Siloam Hospitals also exist in the city. The city also has several laboratorium facilities for many purposes, such as disease control, water and food quality check, and animal health laboratory. Life expectancy of the city is 73.19 years, which is significantly higher than national average and the highest in the province.

=== Religion ===
Darussalam Grand Mosque, Palangka Raya

There are exactly 234 mosques, 204 churches, four Hindu temples, and five Chinese Buddhist temples in the city as of 2020. The largest mosque in the city, according to Ministry of Religious Affairs, is Darussalam Grand Mosque Palangka Raya. It occupies 50,000 square meters of land and has maximum capacity of 10,000 people. It was built in 1984 and located in Jekan Raya District.

St. Mary's Cathedral, Palangkaraya, a Catholic church, located also in Jekan Raya District. It was inaugurated on 21 March 1999. Hindu temples in the city such as Pura Pitamaha, the biggest out of the four, located also in Jekan Raya District, was constructed by Indonesian Army to help local Hindu population in 1978 and now mostly used by Balinese migrants.

== Transportation ==
The city is served by Tjilik Riwut Airport, which is also home to an aviation school operated by Lion Air. The airport served more than 8,000 aircraft and approximately 800,000 passengers in 2020. Palangka Raya has total of 911.83 kilometers of road, of which 563.73 kilometers have been paved with asphalt.

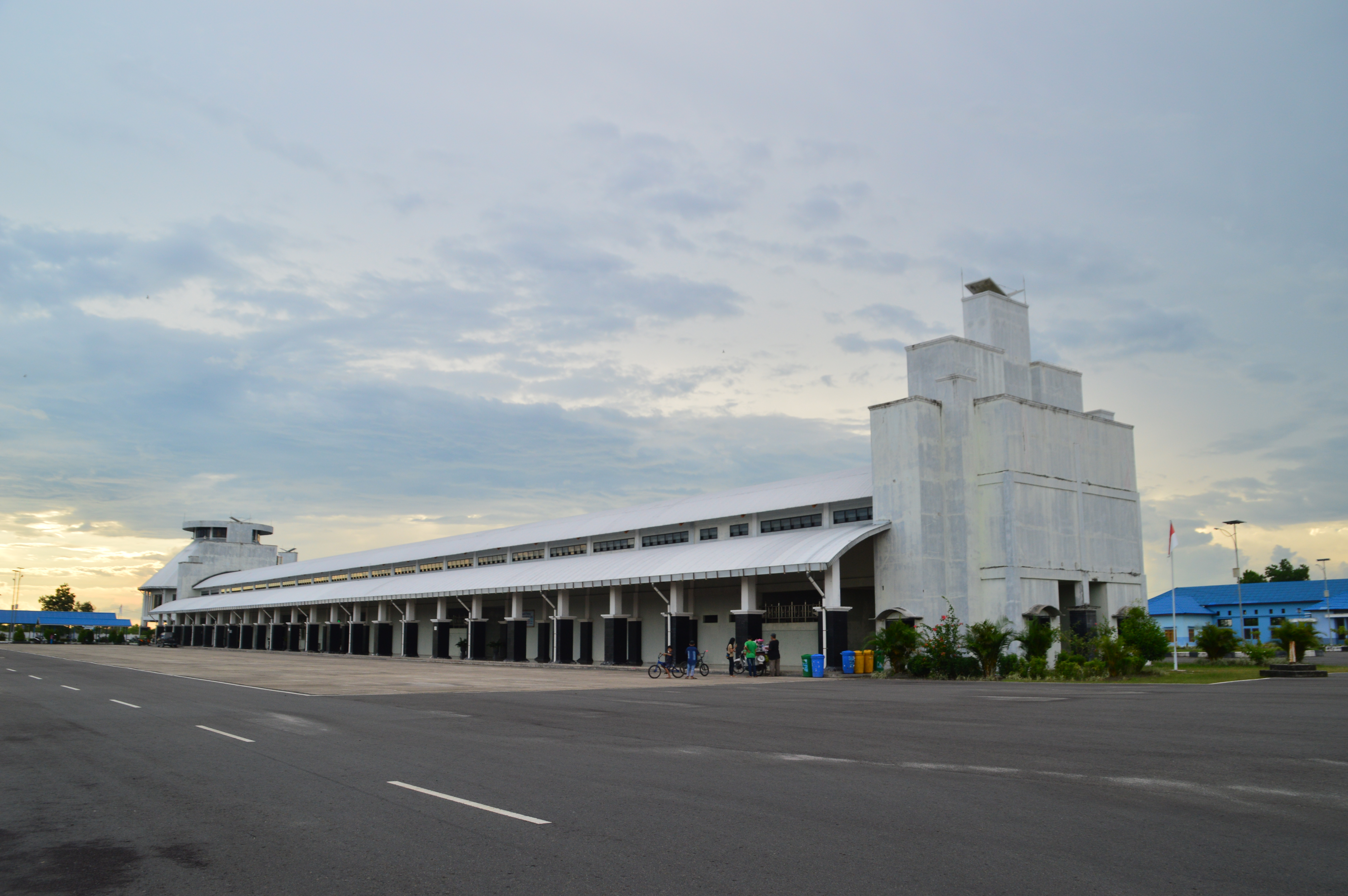
Inter-province bus terminal in Palangka Raya

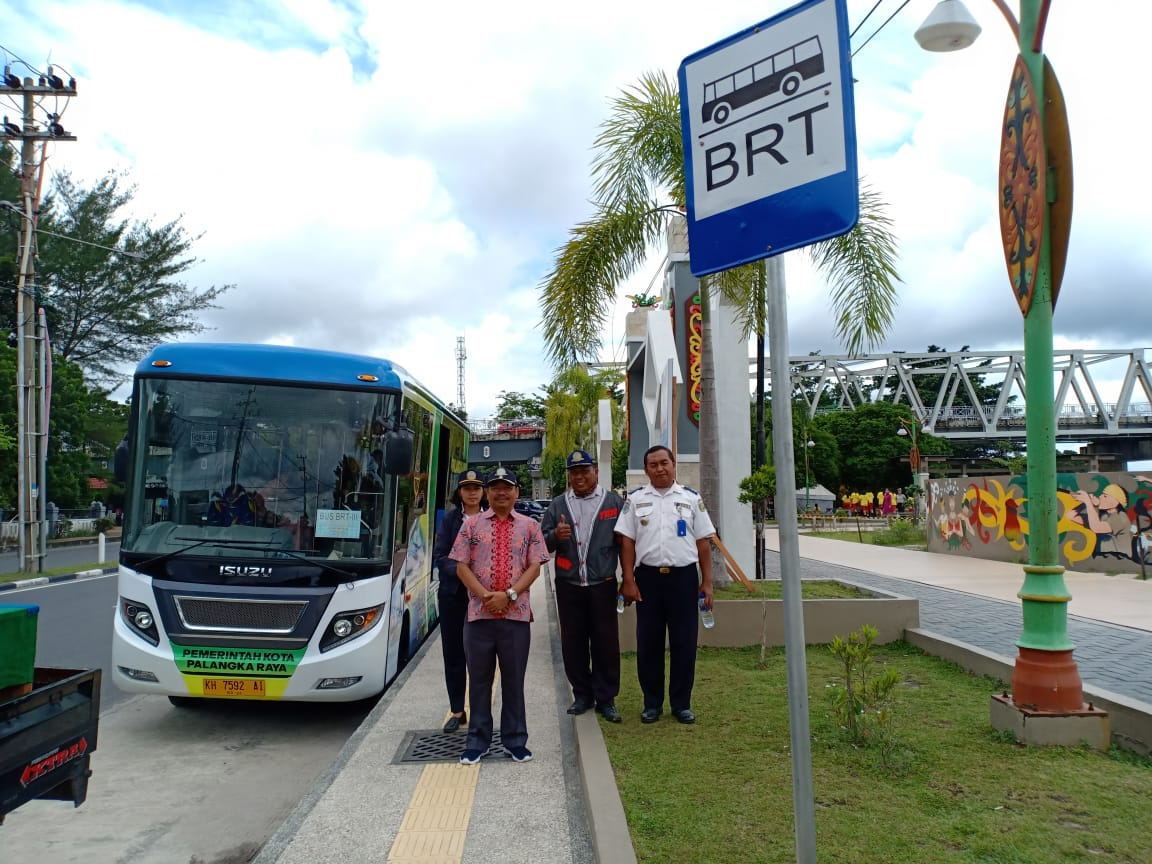
Palangka Raya BRT bus on a bus stop

The Kahayan River bisects the city and is also used for means of transportation. The city has one port, Rambang Port, located on the river and was the primary transit point for goods up until the 1980s. Improved road conditions between Palangka Raya and other regions such as Banjarmasin and Sampit resulted in a decline in the port's use, leading to disrepair. The city government has announced plans to revitalize the river port as a historic landmark and tourist destination.

The city has a bus rapid transit system operated by city government, named Trans Palangkaraya. This BRT system has five lines, and was launched in early 2018. Its operation was halted during the COVID-19 pandemic until resuming on 8 November 2020. App-based ride-hailing services such as Gojek and Grab also serve the city. Angkots used to be important for urban transportation within the city. However, arrival of online ride-hailing services and taxis together with creation of urban bus system resulted in angkot presence's decline. It is estimated as of 2020, 80% of angkot operators has been stop operating due to not being able to cover fuel cost and compete with other public transportation services.

== Media ==
According to the Press Council, there are 14 mass media companies registered in Palangka Raya, ranging from online news, printed media, to television. Radio Republik Indonesia has local branch operating in Palangka Raya, as with most of other major cities in Indonesia. According to Ministry of Communication and Information Technology, there were 13 unlicensed media in Palangka Raya as of 2017.
