= Katingan Regency =

Regency in Central Kalimantan, Indonesia

Katingan Regency Kabupaten Katingan
- Regency
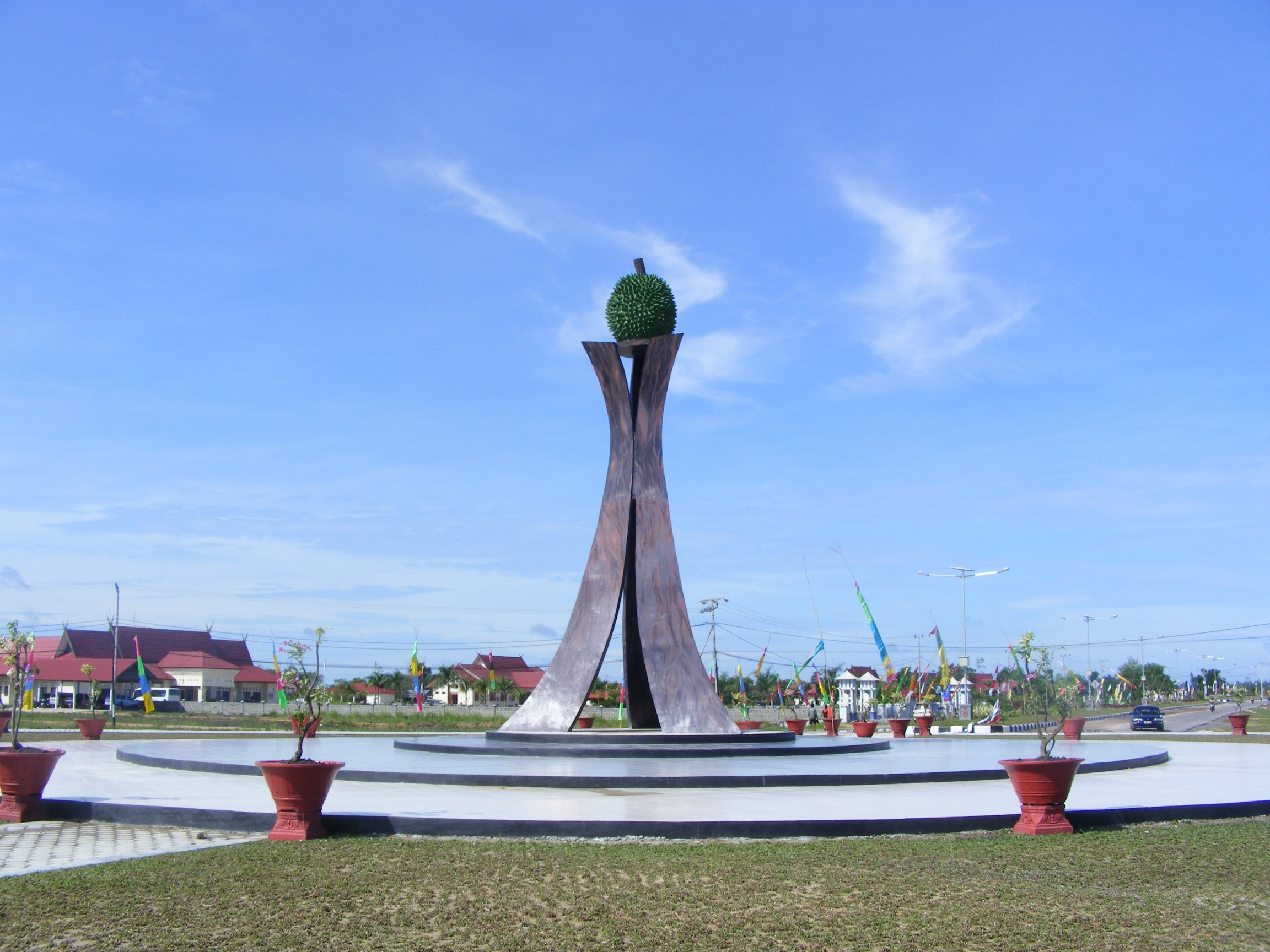
- Durian monument in Kasongan, capital of Katingan

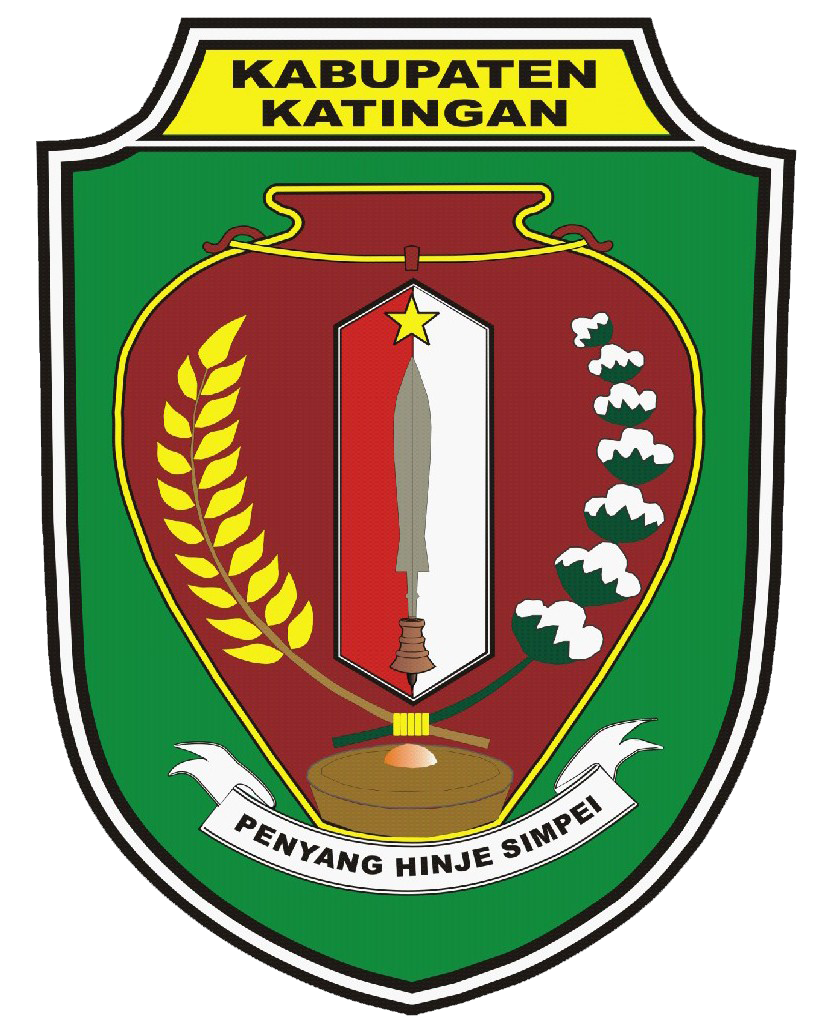
- Coat of arms
- Motto(s): "Penyang Hinje Simpei"; Ngaju language: "Harmonious & Peaceful Living for Collective Prosperity"
- Location within Central Kalimantan

- Location in Kalimantan and Indonesia Katingan Regency (Indonesia)
- Coordinates: 2.0667°S 113.4000°E
- Country: Indonesia
- Region: Kalimantan
- Province: Central Kalimantan
- Capital: Kasongan

Government
  - Regent: Saiful
  - Vice Regent: Firdaus

Area
  - Total: 20,380.50 km^{2} (7,868.96 sq mi)

Population (mid 2025 estimates)
  - Total: 174,341
  - Density: 8.55430/km^{2} (22.1555/sq mi)
- Time zone: UTC+7 (Western Indonesia Time)
- Area code: (+62) 536
- Website: katingankab.go.id

Katingan Regency (Indonesian: Kabupaten Katingan) is one of the thirteen regencies which comprise the Central Kalimantan Province on the island of Kalimantan (Borneo), Indonesia. It was created on 10 April 2002 from what were previously the eastern districts of East Kotawaringin Regency. The town of Kasongan is the capital of the Regency, which covers a land area of 20,380.50 km^{2}. The population of Katingan Regency was 146,439 at the 2010 Census and 162,222 at the 2020 Census; the official estimate as at mid 2025 was 174,341 (comprising 90,120 males and 84,220 females).

== Administrative districts ==
Katingan Regency consists of thirteen districts (kecamatan), tabulated below with their areas and population totals from the 2010 Census and the 2020 Census, together with the official estimates as at mid 2025. They are grouped below for convenience into a southern sector and a northern sector (without any administrative significance). The table also includes the locations of the district administrative centres, the number of administrative villages in each district (a total of 154 rural desa and 7 urban kelurahan), and its postal codes.

| Kode Wilayah | Name of District (kecamatan) | Area in km^{2} | Pop'n Census 2010 | Pop'n Census 2020 | Pop'n Estimate mid 2025 | Admin centre | No. of villages | Post codes |
|---|---|---|---|---|---|---|---|---|
| 62.06.10 | Katingan Kuala ^{(a)} | 1,471.06 | 19,488 | 18,580 | 18,740 | Pegatan | 16 ^{(b)} | 74463 |
| 62.06.09 | Mendawai ^{(c)} | 2,392.06 | 3,810 | 4,160 | 4,380 | Mendawai | 7 | 74464 |
| 62.06.01 | Kamipang | 2,854.34 | 6,269 | 7,171 | 7,720 | Baun Bango | 9 | 74462 |
| 62.06.11 | Tasik Payawan | 808.00 | 6,124 | 7,926 | 8,840 | Petak Bahandang | 8 | 74461 |
| 62.06.02 | Katingan Hilir (Lower Katingan) | 665.00 | 30,688 | 38,850 | 43,920 | Kasongan | 8 ^{(d)} | 74413 |
| | Totals for southern sector | 8,190.46 | 66,379 | 76,687 | 83,600 | | 48 | |
| 62.06.03 | Tewang Sangalang Garing | 900.00 | 11,513 | 13,060 | 14,000 | Pendahara | 10 ^{(e)} | 74452 |
| 62.06.04 | Pulau Malan | 649.00 | 8,544 | 10,488 | 11,680 | Buntut Bali | 14 | 74453 |
| 62.06.05 | Katingan Tengah (Central Katingan) | 1,635.47 | 28,281 | 29,186 | 31,090 | Tumbang Samba | 16 ^{(f)} | 74454 |
| 62.06.06 | Sanaman Mantikei | 1,413.48 | 9,578 | 10,906 | 11,710 | Tumbang Kaman | 14 | 74451 |
| 62.06.12 | Petak Malai | 2,997.93 | 3,751 | 3,627 | 3,660 | Tumbang Baroi | 7 | 74455 |
| 62.06.07 | Marikit | 2,123.48 | 6,619 | 6,809 | 6,960 | Tumbang Hiran | 18 | 74456 |
| 62.06.08 | Katingan Hulu (Upper Katingan) | 1,475.30 | 8,050 | 8,236 | 8,400 | Tumbang Sanamang | 23 ^{(g)} | 74458 |
| 62.06.13 | Bukit Raya | 994.00 | 3,724 | 3,223 | 3,250 | Tumbang Kajamei | 11 | 74457 |
| | Totals for northern sector | 12,190.04 | 80,060 | 85,535 | 90,740 | | 113 | |
| | Totals for Regency | 20,380.50 | 146,439 | 162,222 | 174,341 | Kasongan | 161 | |

Note: (a) including 9 small offshore or riverine islands. (b) including two kelurahan (Pegatan Hilir and Pegatan Hulu, with 2,520 and 2,339 inhabitants respectively in 2023).
(c) including 10 small riverine islands. (d) including two kelurahan (Kasongan Lama and Kasongan Baru, with 15,882 and 3,584 inhabitants respectively in 2023).
(e) including one kelurahan (Pendahara, with 3,565 inhabitants in 2023). (f) including one kelurahan (Samba Kahayan, with 546 inhabitants in 2023).
(g) including one kelurahan (Tumbang Sanamang, with 2,271 inhabitants in 2023).
