= Census in Indonesia =

National census

Censuses in Indonesia are censuses of Indonesia's population, agriculture, and economy conducted by Statistics Indonesia. The first census after independence was held in 1961.

== Legal basis ==
Law No. 16 of 1997 on Statistics governs the census in Indonesia. The law mandates that three types of censuses be held at least every ten years: a population census, an agricultural census, and an economic census. These censuses are administered by Statistics Indonesia (Badan Pusat Statistik), a government agency directly responsible to the President of Indonesia. Government Ordinance No. 51 of 1999 on Statistical Administration further stipulates that population censuses are held on years ending with zero, agricultural censuses are held on years ending with three, and economic censuses are held on years ending with six.

== History ==
Rulers throughout Indonesia's history mostly used censuses for taxation purposes. This association and the counting of households rather than individuals in earlier censuses make their figures highly unreliable.

=== Censuses in the colonial period ===
Sebastiaan Cornelis Nederburgh, the former Commissioner-General of the Dutch Cape Colony, organized the first formal census of Java in 1795. Between 1880 and 1905, the Dutch East Indies conducted partial population counts every five years, with most of the data being limited to Java. This was later followed by full censuses in 1920 and 1930. A third full census was planned for 1940 but was cancelled because of Japanese occupation of the Indies during World War II.

=== Population census ===
After gaining independence, Indonesia did not hold its first census until 1961. The census was incomplete, however, and many of the detailed results have been lost.

Year	Total population	Change in population	World population ranking	Most populous province	Least populous province	Ref(s)
1961	97,018,829	—	5	East Java (21,823,020)	Central Kalimantan (496,522)	
1971	119,208,229	▲22.9%	5	East Java (25,516,999)	Bengkulu (519,316)	
1980	147,490,298	▲23.7%	5	East Java (29,188,852)	Bengkulu (768,064)	
1990	179,378,946	▲21.6%	5	West Java (35,384,352)	Bengkulu (1,179,122)	
2000	206,264,595	▲15.0%	4	West Java (35,729,537)	North Maluku (785,059)	
2010	237,641,326	▲15.2%	4	West Java (43,053,732)	West Papua (760,422)	
2020	270,203,917	▲13.7%	4	West Java (48,274,162)	North Kalimantan (701,814)	
