= 1961 Indonesian census =

First Indonesian census after independence

1961 Population Census Sensus Penduduk 1961
← 1930	31 October 1961	1971 →
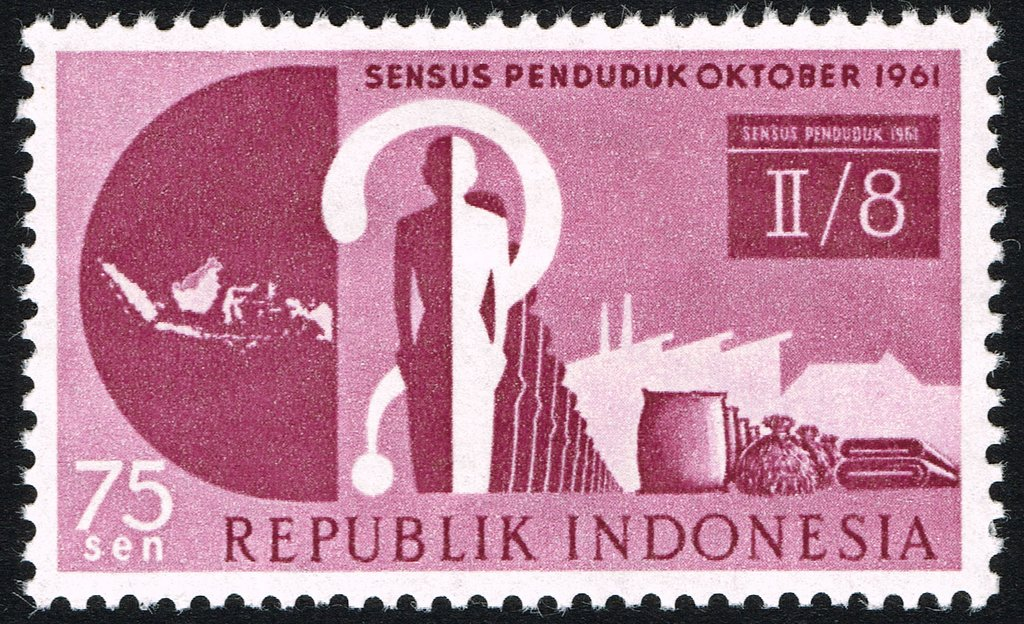
- Postage stamp commemorating the census

General information
- Country: Indonesia
- Authority: Central Bureau of Statistics

Results
- Total population: 97,018,829 (▲59.8%)
- Most populous province: East Java (21,823,020)
- Least populous province: Central Kalimantan (496,522)

The 1961 Indonesian census was the first census of Indonesia as a sovereign state. With a total population of 97,018,829, Indonesia was the world's fifth-most populous country at the time. The census covered all territories in the country, but no enumeration was done in Indonesian-claimed Western New Guinea because it was under Dutch occupation. Instead, an estimated population for the region was included in the final census numbers. During the 1961 census, its population density was 50.9 inhabitants/km^{2}.

As the first census since 1930, when Indonesia was still a colony of the Netherlands, the data was used for planning the nation's future development. One-third of the country's population was under the age of ten, and 65 percent of the population lived on the island of Java, which had been considered overpopulated as early as the 1930s. Demographers highlighted that the large proportion of young people presented a demographic challenge. Given that as many as one-fifth of rural youths were already unemployed, there was a question of whether Indonesia would be able to absorb a future surge of new workers. Agriculture was the dominant industry, employing 72 percent of workers. The census also collected data on school attendance to facilitate education planning. Just under half of the population aged ten and older could read and write in either Latin characters or a non-Latin script.

About 350,000 enumerators were enlisted at the provincial, regency, and district levels. Fields operations began in February 1961, with enumeration and final verification being conducted in October. Tabulation was conducted at the bureau and at the provincial level, but only data for three provinces were ever processed completely. Data for the rest of Indonesia were drawn from a 1 percent sample tabulation of census returns, and many of the original census results have since been lost.

== Background ==
The 1961 census was the first census in Indonesia after independence from the Netherlands. The 1930 Dutch East Indies census was the previous census completed and enumerated a total population of 60,727,233. A census had been planned for 1940, but it was canceled because of World War II. Based on the assumption of a constant rate of growth from the 1930 census, the official population estimate for 1940 was 70.4 million. A subsequent estimate in 1950—this time compiled from civil registration records held by local village heads—placed the population at 77.2 million. However, population records in parts of Java and in the rest of the country at the time were often deficient, and data compilation methods were inconsistent; therefore, the reliability of this estimate has come into question.

In 1953, the United Nations Statistical Commission and Population Commission began encouraging UN member countries to take and complete their national censuses in and around 1960 under a new set of statistical methods. In response, the Djuanda Cabinet created Indonesia's Central Bureau of Statistics (Biro Pusat Statistik, or BPS) through an ordinance in January 1958 and mandated it to prepare a census to be held in 1960 or 1961. The legislature, the People's Representative Council of Mutual Aid (Dewan Perwakilan Rakyat Gotong Royong), repealed a Dutch-era census law in the name of national planning and development, and Law No. 6 of 1960 on the Census became the new legal basis of the census.

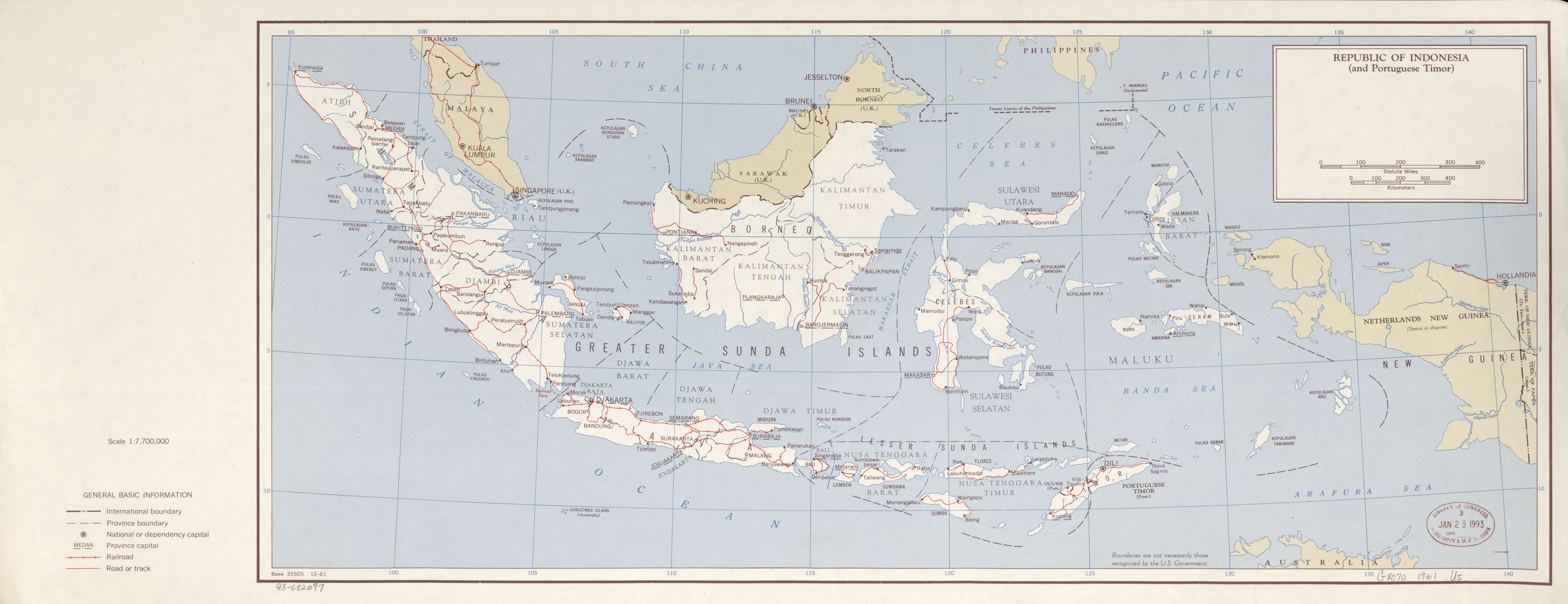
A map of the Indonesian archipelago shows the boundaries of the country's 22 provinces at the time of the 1961 census. Western New Guinea was claimed by Indonesia but remained under Dutch occupation.

== Enumeration and tabulation ==
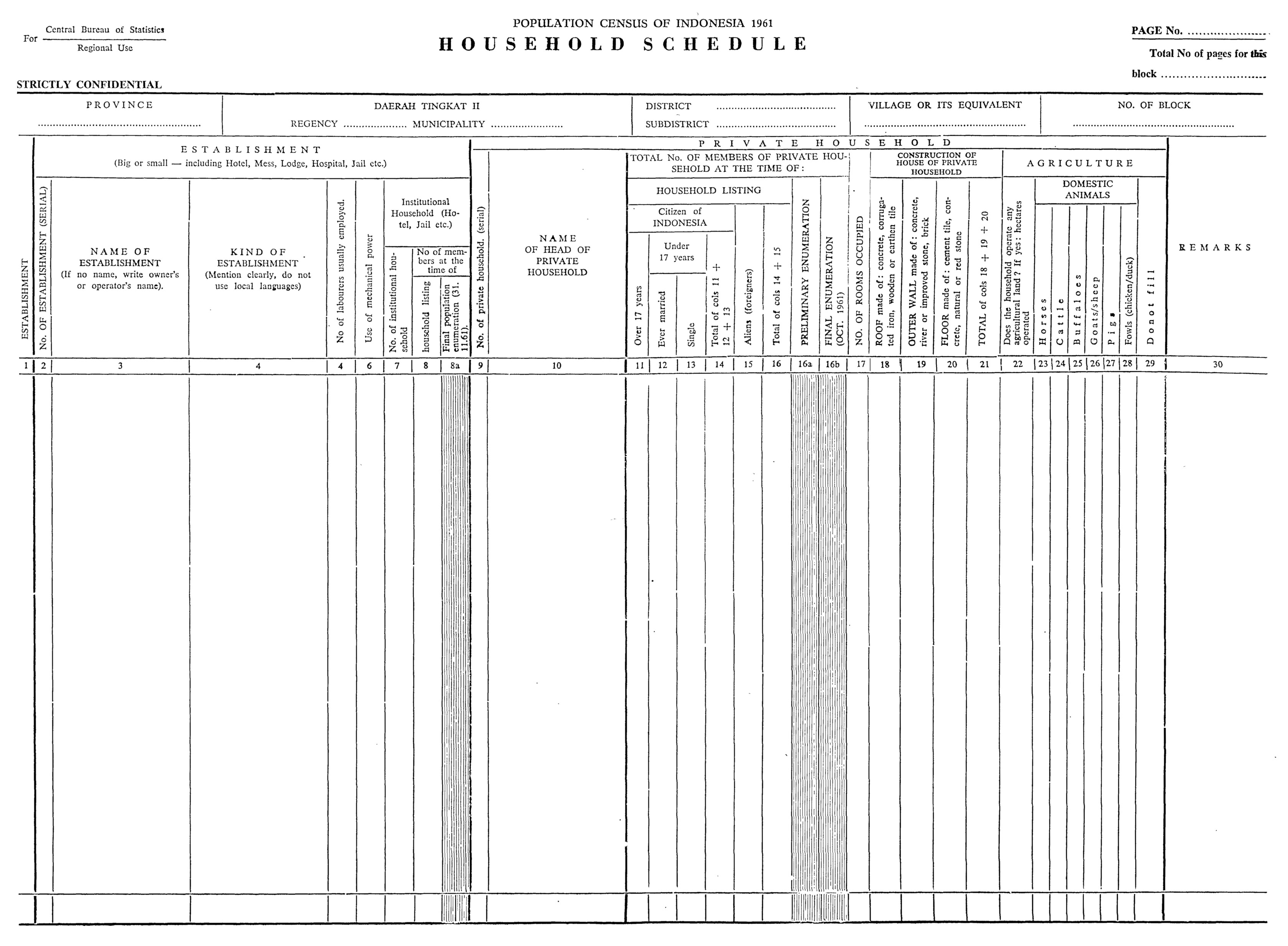
Household schedule used in the 1961 census

Census day was officially designated as 31 October 1961. To facilitate operations, BPS established a census office in each province, and provincial governors were appointed ex officio directors of census operations. Provincial office staff were trained directly by the bureau, and they, in turn, trained census officials at the regency level. The chain continued down to the district level, where enumerators and their supervisors were trained. In total, the census enlisted about 350,000 enumerators and 50,000 supervisors.

Preparations began three years prior with the drawing of enumeration districts and conducting of experimental surveys to simulate the census. Field operations began in February 1961 with the listing and verification of households. Approximately 200,000 enumeration districts were set up, with each district containing about 100 households. These activities continued into October, and the actual population enumeration took place that same month. Enumerators canvassed households—about 57 households per enumerator—and verified their information. In South Sulawesi, enumeration was delayed until December because of security concerns during the Permesta Rebellion. Between 19 and 31 October, enumerators revisited all households to conduct a final check for new births, deaths, and other changes since the household was first canvassed. Individuals not present during canvassing because of their employment and those who had been away from home for less than three months were enumerated at their place of origin.

The census used an individual schedule and a household schedule. The individual schedule collected information on a person's name, relationship to the head of household, sex, age, marital status, nationality, religion, language, place of birth, education, and school attendance. For individuals aged ten or older, the schedule collected information on literacy, type of activity, primary occupation, industry, status in industry, secondary occupation, and the number of births to every married woman. The household scheduled contained separate topics for industrial establishments, institutional households, and private households. For private households, the schedule also captured the type of house and agricultural information.

Tabulation of schedules was done in two groups. Schedules from all urban regions and 10 percent of schedules from rural regions were processed mechanically by the bureau. The remaining 90 percent of rural schedules were tabulated manually at the provincial level. The first provisional results were released in December 1961. This was followed six months later by data on each regency and municipality throughout the country. Only data for three provinces (Jakarta, Yogyakarta, and East Java) were ever processed completely, and data for the rest of the country were drawn from a 1 percent sample tabulation of census returns. Many of the detailed results have since been lost.

== Population data ==
The census yielded a total population of 97,018,829, a nearly 60-percent increase from the 1930 census. This number made Indonesia the world's fifth-most populous country, behind the People's Republic of China (669 million in 1958), India (438 million in 1961), the Soviet Union (214 million in 1960), and the United States (182 million in 1961). The overall sex ratio was 95 males per 100 females. Although the census covered all territories of the country, no enumeration was done in Indonesian-claimed Western New Guinea, which remained under Dutch occupation. Instead, the results included an estimated population of 700,000 for that region. For comparison, Dutch officials reported to the UN in the same year as the census that the indigenous population of Western New Guinea was 717,055. This figure did not include an estimated 12,000 Dutch military soldiers.

Population and area by province and geographical unit, Indonesia, 1961
Province	Geographical unit(s)	Males	Females	Total	Area (km^{2})	Density (persons per km^{2})
Jakarta	Java	1,480,771	1,425,762	2,906,533	577	5,037
West Java	Java	8,657,815	8,956,740	17,614,555	46,300	380
Central Java	Java	8,967,714	9,439,757	18,407,471	34,206	538
Yogyakarta	Java	1,092,403	1,149,074	2,241,477	3,169	707
East Java	Java	10,602,448	11,220,572	21,823,020	47,922	455
South Sumatra	Sumatra	2,465,562	2,381,662	4,847,224	158,163	31
Jambi	Sumatra	386,109	358,272	744,381	44,924	17
Riau	Sumatra	637,064	597,920	1,234,984	94,562	13
West Sumatra	Sumatra	1,117,669	1,201,388	2,319,057	49,778	47
North Sumatra	Sumatra	2,514,328	2,450,406	4,964,734	70,787	70
Aceh	Sumatra	822,102	806,881	1,628,983	55,392	29
West Kalimantan	Kalimantan	802,010	779,024	1,581,034	146,760	11
Central Kalimantan	Kalimantan	251,316	245,206	496,522	152,600	3.3
South Kalimantan	Kalimantan	725,959	747,196	1,473,155	37,660	39
East Kalimantan	Kalimantan	286,963	263,801	550,764	202,440	2.7
North Sulawesi	Sulawesi	1,015,050	988,161	2,003,211	88,578	23
South Sulawesi	Sulawesi	2,474,747	2,601,391	5,076,138	100,457	51
Bali	Lesser Sunda Islands	883,512	899,017	1,782,529	5,561	321
West Nusa Tenggara	Lesser Sunda Islands	893,469	814,361	1,807,830	20,177	90
East Nusa Tenggara	Lesser Sunda Islands	984,415	982,882	1,967,297	47,876	41
Maluku	Maluku Islands	402,500	387,034	789,534	74,505	11
West Irian	Maluku Islands and Western New Guinea	375,154	383,242	758,396	421,951	1.8
Total, Indonesia		47,839,080	49,179,749	97,018,829	1,904,345	51
Source: Nitisastro 2006, pp. 174, 239–248

=== Geographical distribution ===
A main feature of the population of Indonesia is the disparity of population density among its islands. Nearly 65 percent of the total population lived on the island of Java, which only accounts for 6.9 percent of the total area of the country. Java was already widely considered to be overpopulated as early as the 1930s. On the other hand, Kalimantan, which accounts for 28 percent of total area, was inhabited by only 4.2 percent of the total population. The ratio of Java's population to the total population decreased from the 1930 census, indicating a smaller rate of growth compared to other islands. Sumatra and Kalimantan, for example, nearly doubled their population from 1930.

=== Urbanization ===
The proportion of the population living in urban areas nearly doubled from the previous census, from 7.5 percent to almost 15 percent. In 1950s literature on Asian urbanization, Indonesia was commonly viewed as among Southeast Asia's less urbanized countries, although each country applied different criteria for an urban area. The Federation of Malaya, for example, used a numerical criterion of 1,000 inhabitants and above, resulting in an urbanization rate of 42.7 percent in 1957.

The 1961 census considered as urban areas the capital city of Jakarta, 48 autonomous urban entities granted municipality status, all regency capitals or seats of government (separate from municipalities), six areas of urban character with more than 20,000 inhabitants, and other areas arbitrarily judged as urban by a regency head. Because non-numerical criteria were used for this classification, not all towns above a population of 20,000 were counted as urban. Large industrial settlements were also excluded even if local residents considered them towns. By contrast, the 1930 census applied the uniform definition of all areas having "a more or less urban appearance" with more than 1,000 inhabitants as urban, comprising 32 municipalities and 146 non-municipalities.

Population in urban and rural areas, Indonesia, 1961
Area	Java		All other islands		Total, Indonesia	
Area	Population	Percent of total population, Indonesia	Population	Percent of total population, Indonesia	Population	Percent of total population, Indonesia
Urban	9,807,308	10.1	4,551,064	4.7	14,358,372	14.8
Rural	53,185,748	54.8	29,474,709	30.4	82,660,457	85.2
Total, all areas	62,993,056	64.9	34,025,773	35.1	97,018,829	100.0
Source: Nitisastro 2006, p. 178, republished from the 1 percent sample tabulation completed by BPS

About two-thirds of Indonesia's urban population lived on Java. This proportion decreased from 1930, when Java's urban areas accounted for more than 78 percent of Indonesia's urban population. This trend suggests the growth rates of many municipalities outside Java exceeded those of older municipalities in Java, a reflection of the island's historical developments. Colonial exploitation of Java began in the 17th century, whereas resources on the outer islands were not harvested for large scale exports until the late 19th and early 20th centuries. In the 1961 census, 13 of the 23 largest cities with more than 100,000 inhabitants were located on Java. In contrast, only 1 out of 7 cities of this size in 1930 was located outside Java.

Two cities had more than 1 million inhabitants. Jakarta's population grew more than five times from 533,000 in 1930 to 2.97 million, in part because the city had its boundaries extended in 1950. Surabaya in East Java saw its population triple in the same time period to more than 1 million. A third city, Bandung in West Java, was in a close third place with a population of 972,556. Growth due to population movement from the countryside to the cities was a characteristic seen in most developing countries in the post-war period. However, in comparison to neighboring Burma (Myanmar), for example, where growth was largely concentrated in the capital city of Rangoon (Yangon), Indonesia had a more graduated distribution of city sizes that was similar to some developed countries. Of the cities with a population of more than 100,000, Bandung, along with Medan and Pematangsiantar in North Sumatra, grew at a faster rate than Jakarta. The fastest growing city, Pekanbaru in Riau, had an annual growth rate of 13.1 percent.

=== Age distribution ===
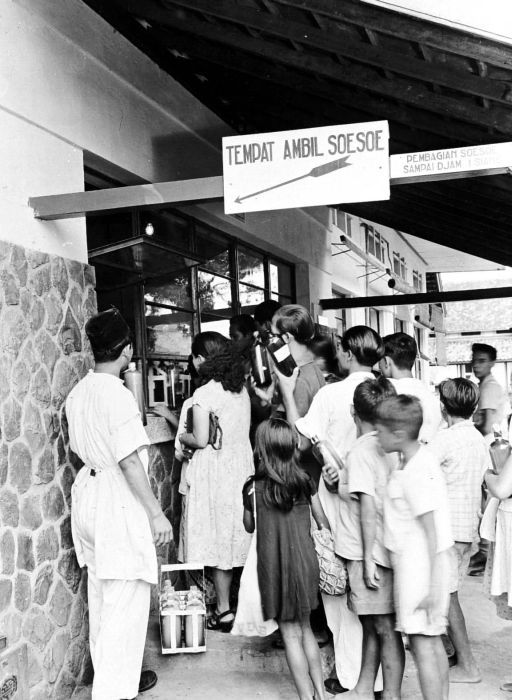
People collect baby milk at the Central Public Hospital in Jakarta in 1951. Increased availability of food contributed to a population boom reflected in census data.

A very high percentage of the population (33.6 percent) were children under the age of ten, a reflection of declining infant and child mortality in the 1950s attributed to significant reductions in cases of yaws, tuberculosis, and malaria, and better food availability and nutrition compared to the 1940s. Of the total population, 55.3 percent were of working age (ages 15–64). This proportion was higher in Java (56.5 percent) and in urban areas (57.6 percent). Demographer Kurt Horstmann theorized that the flat population distribution between ages ten and thirty-five was an economic disadvantage for Indonesia in the 1950s. A more normal distribution would have provided the country with a larger working population. Overall, the dependency ratio was 81 dependent persons per 100 working individuals. Combining age data with urban–rural distribution data showed an influx of younger workers to urban centers. The 15–24 age group had greater representation in cities (20 percent of the urban population) than in the countryside (15 percent of the rural population).

Population by age and sex, Indonesia, 1961
Age group	Males (Note: Age distribution numbers exclude the estimated population of Western New Guinea (700,000).)	Females	Total	Percent of total
0–4	8,461,949	8,580,361	17,042,310	17.7%
5–9	7,683,534	7,639,422	15,322,956	15.9%
10–14	4,318,543	3,860,869	8,179,412	8.5%
15–19	3,834,117	3,874,058	7,708,175	8.0%
20–24	3,452,362	4,338,603	7,790,965	8.1%
25–34	7,333,617	8,542,102	15,875,719	16.5%
35–44	5,719,856	5,363,334	11,083,190	11.5%
45–54	3,559,007	3,483,325	7,042,332	7.3%
55–64	1,897,510	1,850,396	3,747,906	3.9%
65–74	795,730	829,027	1,624,757	1.7%
75+	377,747	406,609	784,356	0.8%
Unknown	59,882	56,869	116,751	0.1%
Total, all ages	47,493,854	48,824,975	96,318,829	100.0%
Source: Nitisastro 2006, p. 179 Notes:

=== Labor and economy ===
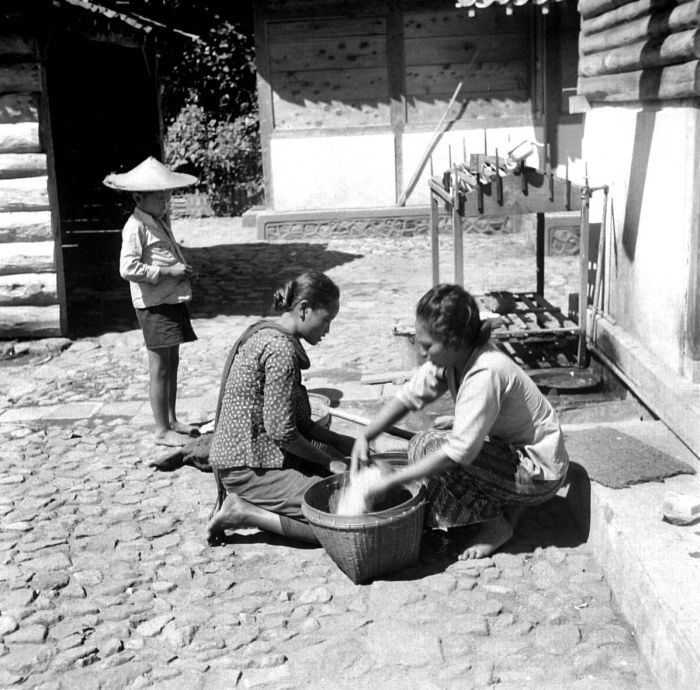
A woman sells rice in the backyard of her house in Madiun, East Java. The majority of females in rural areas did both housework and another economic activity at the same time.

The labor force in 1961 accounted for approximately 54 percent of the population aged ten and older, about 34.6 million in total. They comprised individuals who worked at least two out of the six months preceding the census and those who were unemployed but seeking work. The average unemployment rate stood at 5.4 percent. Three-fourths of all employed persons were males. The female labor participation rate was less than half of the male population. Female unemployment was higher at 7.0 percent, compared to 4.8 percent for males. In Jakarta, the unemployment rate exceeded 7 percent. Although urban areas had a higher percentage of unemployment than rural areas, underemployment was a serious concern in rural areas. Among agricultural workers in rural areas of Java and Madura, as many as one-third were underemployed. At the same time, rural areas also saw a majority of females being engaged in both homemaking and another economic activity simultaneously.

Population aged ten and older by occupation and sex, Indonesia, 1961
Occupation	Males		Females		Both sexes	
Occupation	No.	%	No.	%	No.	%
Employed	23,805,691	76.0	8,902,923	27.3	32,708,614	51.2
Unemployed	1,203,106	3.8	666,514	2.0	1,869,620	2.9
Total, labor force	25,008,797	79.8	9,569,437	29.3	34,578,234	54.1
Students	3,832,931	12.2	2,539,464	7.8	6,372,395	9.9
Home-houseworkers	1,017,245	3.2	18,494,942	56.8	19,512,187	30.5
Others and unknown	1,489,398	4.7	2,001,349	6.1	3,490,747	5.5
Total, all occupations	31,348,371	100.0	32,605,192	100.0	63,953,563	100.0
Source: Nitisastro 2006, p. 183

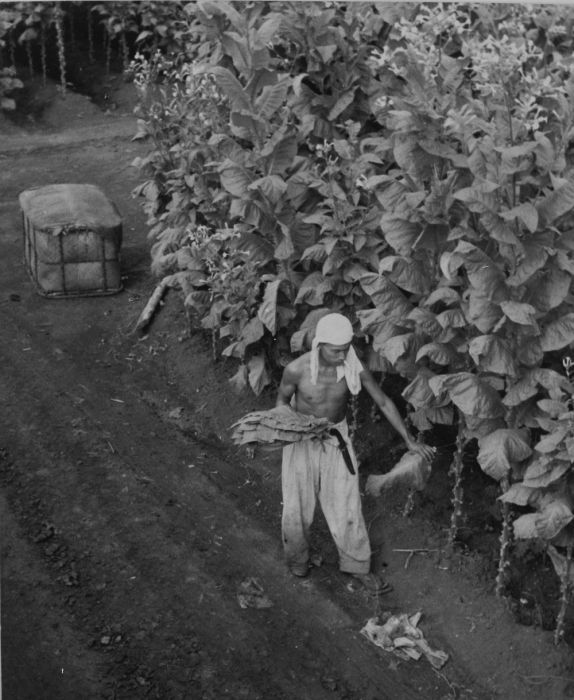
A man gathers leaves from tobacco plants on a plantation in Tanjung Morawa, North Sumatra. Agriculture was the dominant industry and employed 72 percent of Indonesia's workers.

Agriculture (including forestry and fishing) was the dominant industry, employing nearly 72 percent of workers, whereas manufacturing employed less than 6 percent. The share of workers in agriculture showed little or no change relative to 1930. Java had the lowest percentage of workers in the agriculture sector, but it had the highest percentage employed in manufacturing, trade, and services. In urban areas, one-third workers were employed in the services sector, whereas manufacturing only employed one-sixth of urban workers. In rural areas, agriculture comprised 81 percent of workers. Although trade and services accounted for less than 5 percent and less than 6 percent of rural workers, respectively, those engaged in agriculture likely considered these their secondary economic activities. Approximately 1 million children aged 10–14 were in employment (3.4 percent of the employed labor force), with agriculture making up 87 percent of that group's economic activities.

Employed persons aged ten and older by economic activity and sex, Indonesia, 1961
Economic activity	Males		Females		Both sexes	
Economic activity	No.	%	No.	%	No.	%
Agriculture, forestry, and fishing	17,371,811	72.9	6,144,386	69.0	23,516,197	71.9
Mining and quarrying	76,959	0.3	10,435	0.1	87,394	0.3
Manufacturing	1,158,760	4.9	697,392	7.7	1,856,152	5.7
Construction	560,584	2.3	21,456	0.2	582,040	1.8
Electricity, water, and gas	48,104	0.2	2,625	0.02	50,729	0.1
Trade, banking, and insurance	1,510,566	6.3	683,412	7.5	2,193,978	6.7
Transportation, storage, and communication	666,879	2.8	24,850	0.2	691,459	2.1
Services	2,038,531	8.6	1,056,708	11.6	3,095,239	9.5
Other and unknown	373,497	1.6	261,929	2.9	635,426	1.9
Total, all activities	23,805,691	100.0	8,902,923	100.0	32,708,614	100.0
Source: Nitisastro 2006, p. 189

=== Literacy and education ===
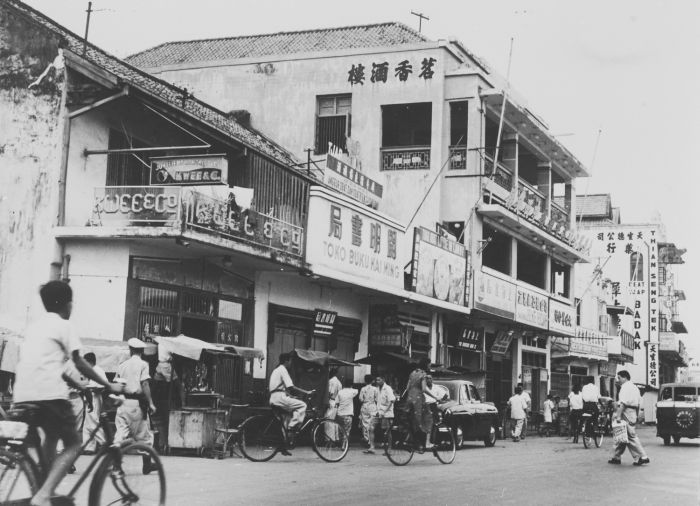
Shops in the Chinese district of Glodok, Jakarta, display signs in Latin and Chinese characters.

The literacy rate for persons aged ten and older was 46.7 percent. This figure included those who were able to read and write in either Latin characters or in a non-Latin script such as Javanese, Arabic, or Chinese. Individuals who could read but not write were categorized as illiterate. Literacy in Sumatra was higher, at 56.6 percent, than other geographic regions. Among males, this figure reached almost 70 percent. In Java, the overall literacy rate was 45.5 percent. In urban areas, two-thirds of persons aged ten and older were literate, whereas rural areas had a literacy rate of 43 percent. The introduction of literacy campaigns in years prior to the census resulted a smaller gap in literacy between males and females in the youngest age groups. About 72 percent of children aged 10–14 (76.2 percent of males and 67.7 percent of females) could read and write.

Percentage of population aged ten and older able to read and write by region and sex, Indonesia, 1961
Region	Males	Females	Both sexes
Java	59.2	32.6	45.5
Sumatra	69.3	43.7	56.6
Kalimantan	58.7	31.0	45.0
Sulawesi	51.9	35.8	43.6
Other islands	51.0	26.6	38.8
Average, Indonesia	59.8	34.1	46.7
Source: Nitisastro 2006, p. 191

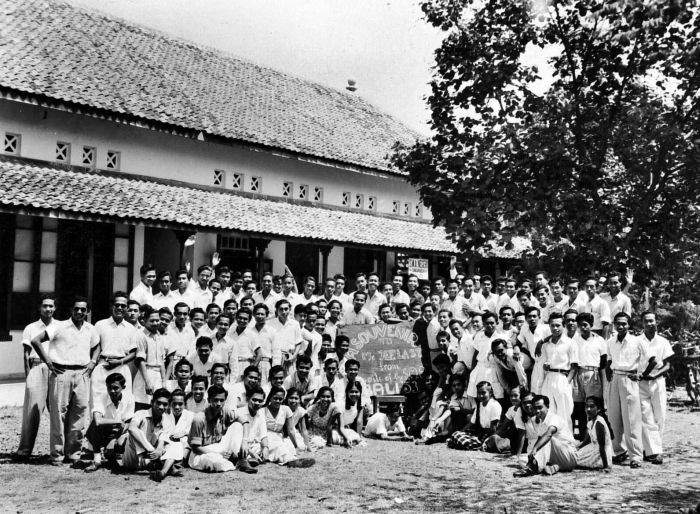
Students at a senior high school in Singaraja, Bali

In rural areas, almost 70 percent of those ten years and older have never completed primary school. This figure was 42 percent in urban areas. Sumatra had the highest percentage of population aged ten and older who completed primary education at almost 40 percent, as well as the highest percentage who finished some higher school at 4.2 percent. In Java, only 30.5 percent of persons aged ten and older had completed primary school, and 3.2 percent completed education at a higher school. The proportion of persons who completed primary school increased for younger age groups. Among all individuals who completed primary school, the 10–24 age group accounted for 56.1 percent.

Percentage of population aged ten and older by level of education, Indonesia, 1961
Age group	No school	Primary school (3–7 years)	Higher school
10–14	43.4	55.8	0.8
15–19	42.5	50.5	7.0
20–24	54.3	37.9	7.8
25–34	67.9	29.0	3.1
35–44	73.7	24.6	1.7
45–54	82.6	16.1	1.3
55–64	88.6	10.6	0.8
65–74	91.8	7.6	0.6
75+	93.3	6.3	0.6
Unknown	71.6	25.5	0.4
Average, aged 10 and over	64.8	32.1	3.1
Source: Nitisastro 2006, p. 195

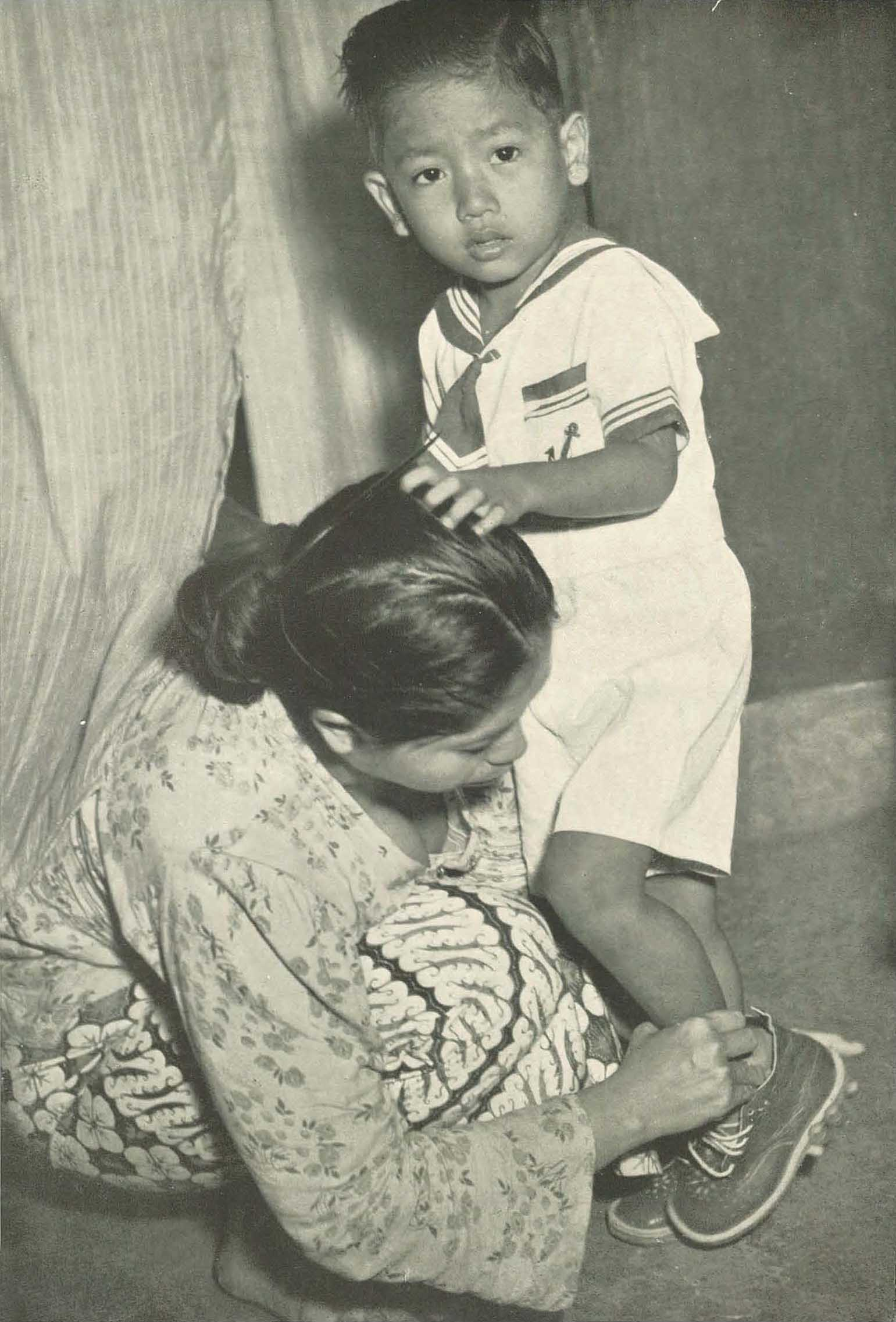
A woman dresses her son for the first day of school.

Most Indonesian children started school at the age of seven or older. To facilitate education planning, BPS created a separate table of school attendance figures among children aged seven to thirteen. On average, school attendance in this group was about 55 percent, with three-fourths of children in urban areas and just over half of children in rural areas attending school. Although attendance rates for males and females did not differ greatly within each region, there was a larger discrepancy among females of different regions than among males.

Percentage of children aged 7–13 attending school by region and sex, Indonesia, 1961
Region	Males	Females	Both sexes
Java	58.3	52.2	55.3
Sumatra	62.9	57.4	60.2
Kalimantan	46.8	41.9	44.5
Sulawesi	55.9	52.5	54.3
Other islands	49.1	37.5	43.5
Average, Indonesia	57.7	51.7	54.8
Source: Nitisastro 2006, p. 198

== Subsequent analyses ==
=== Gaps in ethnographic data ===
Religion in Jakarta (1961)
1. Islam (84.7%)
2. Buddhism, Hinduism, and Confucianism (7.8%)
3. Protestantism (3.1%)
4. Catholicism (1.7%)
5. Other and unknown (2.7%)

Unlike the previous census completed in 1930, the 1961 census did not capture information on Indonesia's ethnic groups. No ethnicity data was collected by successive governments from independence through the 1990s because they believed that information about the country's ethnic composition could be used to incite social and political instability. Such data would not be collected until the 2000 census following democratization and reforms in 1998. As a result, analyses of ethnic groupings at the national level throughout most of the 20th century were either extrapolated from 1930 data or educated estimates.

Demographers have noted that this position on ethnicity differed from the government's attitude toward religion, whose information has been collected in all population censuses. Even so, religion was considered a sensitive topic that the complete 1961 data was never made public. BPS only released statistics on religion for Jakarta, while researchers later obtained unpublished data for Yogyakarta and East Java.

=== Population projections ===
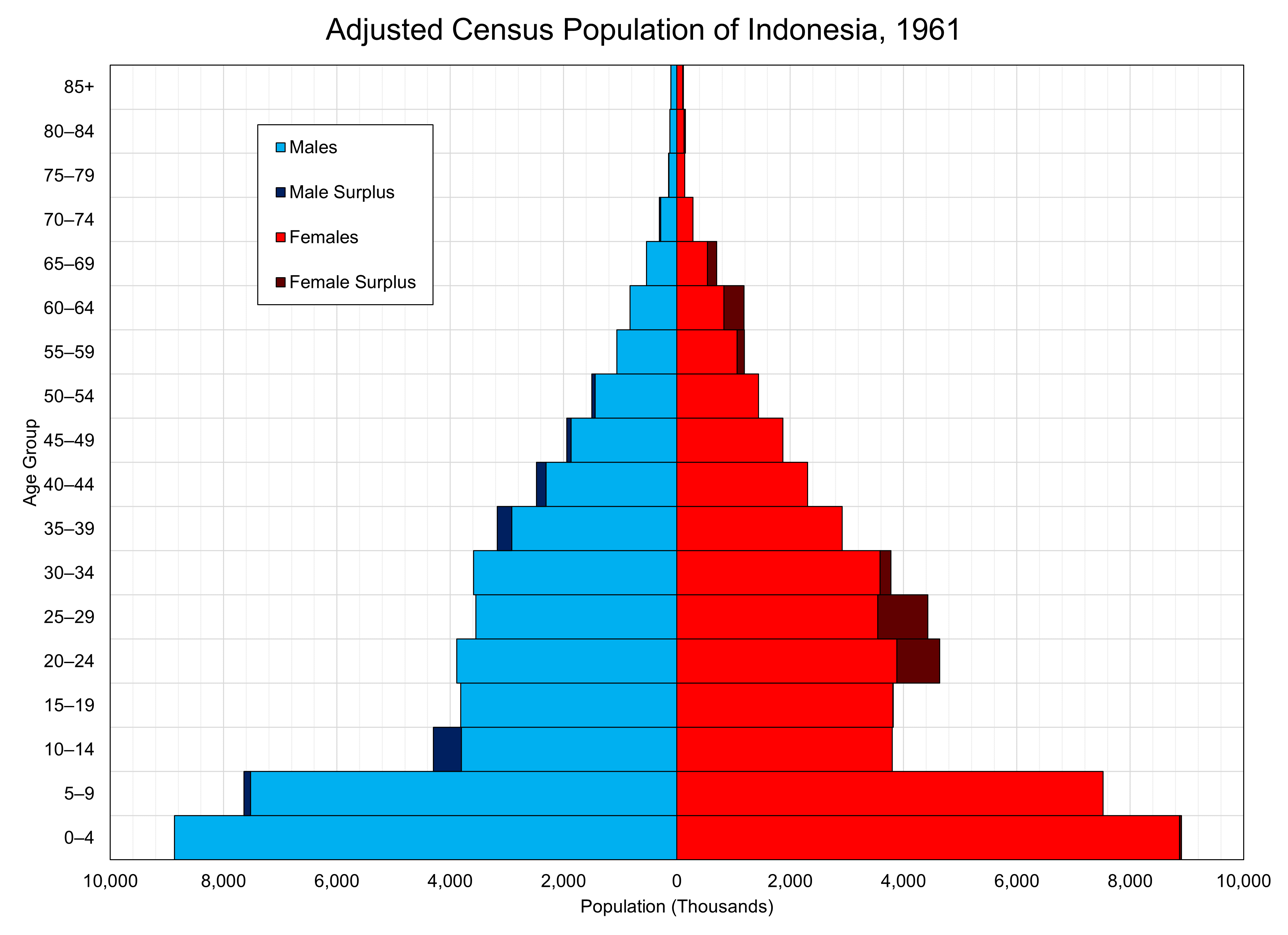
Population pyramid of Indonesia in 1961 with adjustments to census data by economist Widjojo Nitisastro

A post-enumeration survey was conducted in the same year as the census throughout Java, but only in the provincial capitals for other islands. It found that Java had a net underenumeration of 0.19 percent, whereas the other provincial capitals had a net underenumeration of 0.45 percent. In Jakarta, data on the distribution of population by single year of age showed a tendency of age heaping at ages ending with zero and five and at ages twelve and eighteen. There were also patterns of underenumeration of very young children, overestimation of the ages of old people, and understatements of ages by young females—all commonly seen in population censuses. Economist Widjojo Nitisastro, who headed National Development Planning Agency (Badan Perencanaan Pembangunan Nasional, or Bappenas), applied adjustments to the sex-age data to make population projections through 1991. Demographic surveys were also conducted in each of the subsequent three years. Census planners used information from the completed census and surveys to make improvements to the following census in 1971.

Given the large proportion of population aged 5–14, demographer Nathan Keyfitz estimated that the number of people entering the labor force would rise from 1.5 million annually in the mid-1960s to over 3 million annually in the early 1970s, raising the question of whether the Indonesian economy could absorb the surge of new workers. He highlighted that the census already showed that as much as one-fifth of young people in rural areas were already unemployed. He anticipated population pressures in land-scarce Java, which was three-quarters rural. Economist Alex Hunter noted that the former Dutch colonial government attempted to solve this problem by introducing a transmigration program to move landless people to less populous outer islands, but the program saw little success among the Javanese. Keyfitz predicted instead that rural-to-urban migration would accelerate, continuing the pattern of rapid growth in cities seen in the census. Demographer Gavin Jones agreed that rural-urban migration was more practical, but noted that "dismal economic performance" in the first half of the 1960s resulted in poor employment opportunities and living conditions in urban areas.

== See also ==
- Demographics of Indonesia
- Economic history of Indonesia
