= Demographics of Indonesia =

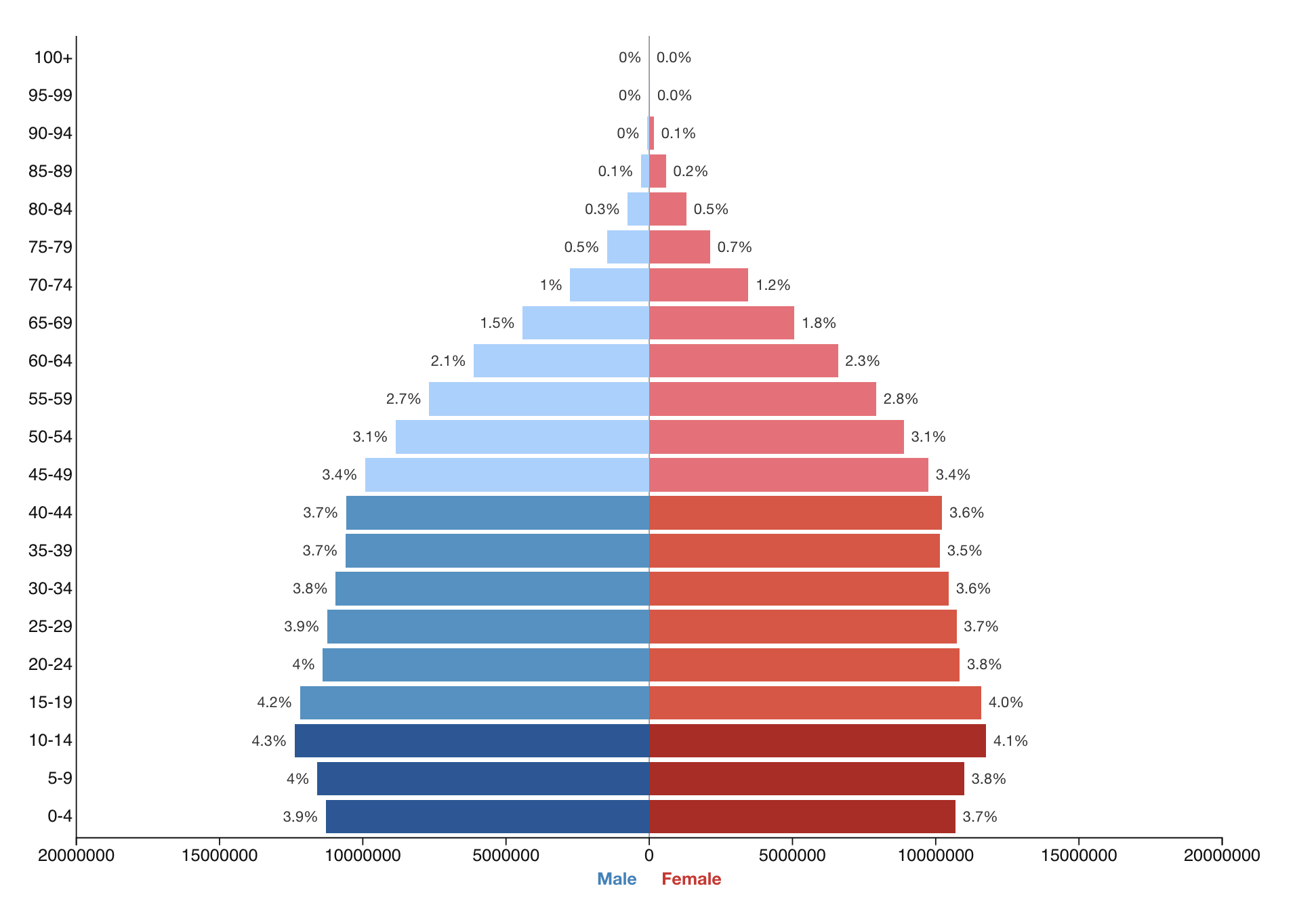
- Population pyramid of Indonesia in 2026
- Population: ▲290.121,089 (mid-2026, Civil Registration) ▲270,203,917 (2020 census)
- Growth rate: +0.63% (2026)
- Birth rate: 15.32 births/1,000 population (2022 est.)
- Death rate: 6.75 deaths/1,000 population (2022 est.)
- Life expectancy: ▲73.08 years
  - male: 70.86 years
  - female: 75.4 years
- Fertility rate: ▼2.0 children born/woman (2025 est.)
- Infant mortality: 16.6 deaths/1,000 live births
- Net migration rate: -0.71 migrant(s)/1,000 population (2022 est.)

Age structure
- 0–14 years: 23.33%
- 15–64 years: 70.72%
- 65 and over: 5.95%

Sex ratio
- Total: 1 male(s)/female (2022 est.)
- At birth: 1.05 male(s)/female
- Under 15: 1.05 male(s)/female
- 65 and over: 0.66 male(s)/female

Nationality
- Nationality: Indonesian
- Major ethnic: Javanese (40.22%)
- Minor ethnic: Sundanese (15.51%); Malay (3.70%); Batak (3.58%); Madurese (3.03%); Betawi (2.88%); Minangkabau (2.73%); Buginese (2.71%); Bantenese (1.96%); Banjar (1.74%); Others (600+ ethnic groups) (22.01%)

Language
- Official: Indonesian
- Spoken: Javanese; Sundanese; Malay; Madurese; Minangkabau; Banjarese; Buginese; Balinese; Batak; Others (700+ regional languages)

Historical population

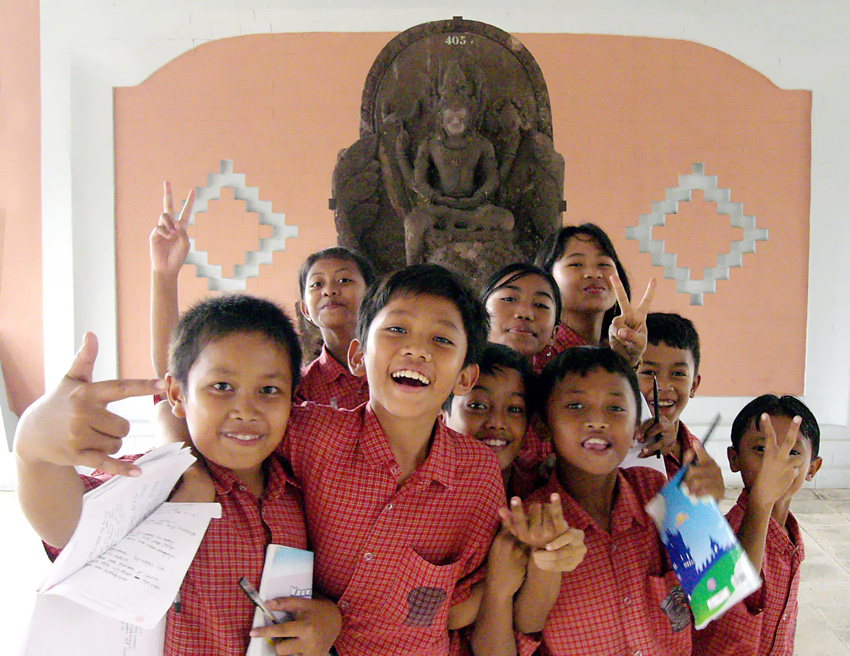
Indonesian students during a school excursion to a museum; Indonesia currently possesses a relatively young population.

Indonesia is a highly diverse country, both ethnically and linguistically. The country's population reached 270.20 million according to the 2020 national census, up from 237.64 million in 2010. As of mid-2025, the official estimate stood at 284.44 million, reflecting an annual growth rate of 1.11%. It remains the fourth most populous country in the world. Java, excluding Madura, is home to approximately 52% of the national population, making it the most densely populated island globally.

Despite a fairly effective family planning program that has been in place since 1967, Indonesia's average population growth per year was over 1.1% for the decade ending in 2020, nearly having 13% population growth for that decade. At this rate, Indonesia's population is no longer projected to surpass the population of the United States (whose population is increasing at a faster rate), and it is itself projected by the United Nations (UN) to be overtaken in population by Nigeria and by Pakistan by 2040. Indonesia has a relatively young population compared to many Western countries, although it is gradually aging due to declining birth rates and rising life expectancy. As of 2017, the median age stood at 30.2 years. According to the 2025 Intercensal Population Survey (SUPAS), the total fertility rate in Indonesia stood at 2.13, which is just above the replacement rate. However, there are still significant differences in fertility rates across various provinces of the country.

The country is among the most ethnically and linguistically diverse in the world, home to over 600 ethnic groups and more than 700 languages. Since gaining independence, Indonesian has served as the national language and is widely used in education, government, business, and formal communication. However, most Indonesians grow up speaking a regional language as their mother tongue, using Indonesian primarily as a lingua franca for interethnic interaction. Major regional languages include Javanese, Sundanese, Minangkabau, Buginese, Balinese, and Batak, among many others. The Javanese, who make up about 40% of the population, have historically held significant political influence, with every president since independence having at least partial or full Javanese ancestry.

== Population ==
Population data of Indonesia

Provinces of Indonesia by urban population percentage

Provinces of Indonesia by population density per square kilometer in 2020

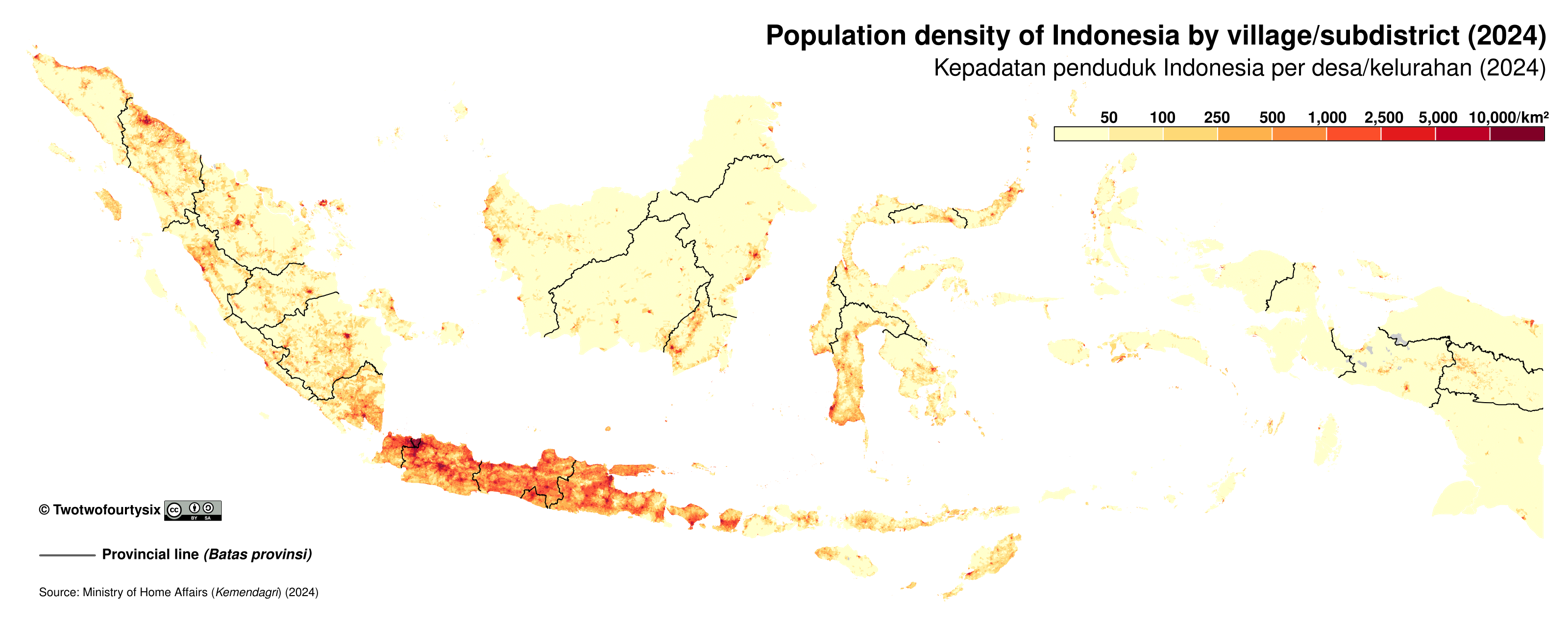
Villages of Indonesia by population density per square kilometer in 2024

Historical Population of Indonesia with Annual Growth Rate
Year	Population	±% p.a.
1	2,000,000	—
1000	3,500,000	+0.06%
1500	7,750,000	+0.16%
1700	9,500,000	+0.10%
1840	20,000,000	—
1930	60,727,233	+0.81%
1955	77,473,268	+0.98%
1961	97,085,348	+3.83%
1971	119,208,229	+2.07%
1976	141,862,419	+3.54%
1980	147,490,298	+0.98%
1990	179,378,946	+1.98%
2000	206,264,595	+1.41%
2010	237,641,326	+1.43%
2020	270,203,917	+1.29%

Source: Our World in Data, Statistics Indonesia, Wertheim (1959), Geografi dan Kependudukan (1976), Widjojo Nitisastro (2006)

=== Population by province ===
Province	Population (2010 census)	Urban % in 2010	Total Fertility Rate (2010 census)	Population (2020 census)	Urban % in 2022	Total Fertility Rate (2020 census)
Aceh	4,494,410	23.6%	2.79	5,274,900	33.9%	
North Sumatra	12,982,204	42.4%	3.01	14,799,400	55.5%	2.48
West Sumatra	4,846,909	29.0%	2.91	5,534,500	48.5%	2.46
Riau	5,538,367	43.7%	2.82	6,394,100	40.0%	2.28
Jambi	3,092,265	28.3%	2.51	3,548,200	33.8%	2.28
South Sumatra	7,450,394	34.4%	2.56	8,467,400	37.7%	2.23
Bengkulu	1,715,518	29.4%	2.51	2,010,700	33.3%	2.30
Lampung	7,608,405	21.0%	2.45	9,007,800	32.9%	2.28
Bangka Belitung Islands	1,223,296	43.0%	2.54	1,455,700	57.6%	2.24
Riau Islands	1,679,163	67.4%	2.38	2,064,600	87.1%	2.21
Banten	10,632,166	52.2%	2.35	11,904,600	72.4%	2.01
Jakarta	9,607,787	100.0%	1.82	10,562,100	100.0%	1.75
West Java	43,053,732	50.3%	2.43	48,274,200	77.5%	2.11
Central Java	32,382,657	40.4%	2.20	36,516,000	51.7%	2.09
Special Region of Yogyakarta	3,457,491	57.7%	1.94	3,668,700	73.1%	1.89
East Java	37,476,757	40.9%	2.00	40,665,700	54.9%	1.98
Bali	3,890,757	49.8%	2.13	4,317,400	66.9%	2.04
West Nusa Tenggara	4,500,212	34.8%	2.59	5,320,100	49.6%	
East Nusa Tenggara	4,683,827	15.9%	3.82	5,325,600	25.9%	2.79
West Kalimantan	4,395,983	25.1%	2.64	5,414,400	36.4%	2.33
Central Kalimantan	2,212,089	27.5%	2.56	2,670,000	42.2%	2.31
South Kalimantan	3,626,616	36.3%	2.35	4,073,600	48.5%	2.31
East Kalimantan	3,028,487	57.6%	2.61	3,766,000	68.6%	2.18
North Kalimantan	524,656			701,800	63.4%	
North Sulawesi	2,270,596	37.0%	2.43	2,621,900	53.7%	2.10
Gorontalo	1,040,164	25.5%	2.76	1,171,700	43.5%	2.30
Central Sulawesi	2,635,009	19.7%	2.94	2,985,700	31.5%	2.32
South Sulawesi	8,034,776	29.4%	2.55	9,073,500	44.6%	2.22
Southeast Sulawesi	2,232,586	20.8%	3.20	2,624,900	37.6%	2.57
West Sulawesi	1,158,651	--	3.33	1,419,200	21.4%	2.58
Maluku	1,533,506	25.9%	3.56	1,848,900	37.0%	2.52
North Maluku	1,038,087	29.5%	3.35	1,282,900	27.3%	2.47
Papua	2,833,381	22.2%	2.87	4,303,700	30.2%	2.76
West Papua	760,422	--	3.18	1,134,100	42.8%	2.66
Indonesia	237,641,326		2.41	270,203,900	56.4%	2.18

Source: Population Census 2010, except for final column, taken from Population Census 2020.

Note: ^{(a)} North Kalimantan province was created in 2012 (by separation from East Kalimantan province); the 2010 total figures given are those for the provinces as they were following that splitting (Urban % and Total Fertility Rate columns unadjusted).

=== Age structure ===
0-14 years: 23.33%
15-64 years: 70.72%
65 years and over: 5.95% (2020 census)

Age structure in Indonesia (2020)
1. Minor: 0-14 years (23.3%)
2. Workforce: 15-64 years (70.7%)
3. Retiree: 65 years and over (6.00%)

Median age of Indonesia by district (2022)

Population Estimates by Sex and Age Group (01.VII.2020) (Data are based on the publication: "Indonesia Population Projection 2015-2045"):

Age group	Male	Female	Total	%
Total	135 337 011	134 266 419	269 603 430	100
0–4	11 101 528	10 850 465	21 951 993	8.14
5–9	11 205 657	10 739 503	21 945 160	8.14
10–14	11 284 333	10 884 509	22 168 842	8.22
15–19	11 189 861	10 949 531	22 139 392	8.21
20–24	11 070 774	10 887 555	21 958 329	8.14
25–29	10 963 605	10 736 361	21 699 966	8.05
30–34	10 777 337	10 524 673	21 302 010	7.90
35–39	10 477 475	10 305 704	20 783 179	7.71
40–44	9 830 929	9 693 109	19 524 038	7.24
45–49	9 140 315	9 023 924	18 164 239	6.74
50–54	7 975 551	7 947 477	15 923 028	5.91
55–59	6 632 329	6 691 467	13 323 796	4.94
60–64	5 234 762	5 287 052	10 521 814	3.90
65-69	3 758 966	3 921 263	7 680 229	2.85
70-74	2 485 308	2 757 062	5 242 370	1.94
75+	2 208 281	3 066 764	5 275 045	1.96
Age group	Male	Female	Total	Percent
0–14	33 591 518	32 474 477	66 065 995	24.50
15–64	93 292 938	92 046 853	185 339 791	68.75
65+	8 452 555	9 745 089	18 197 644	6.75

== Vital statistics ==
Fertility rate of Indonesia by province (2017)

=== United Nations estimates ===
Period	Population	Live births	Deaths	Natural change	CBR (Note: CBR = crude birth rate (per 1000); CDR = crude death rate (per 1000); NC = natural change (per 1000); TFR = total fertility rate (number of children per woman); IMR = infant mortality rate per 1000 births)	CDR	NC	TFR	IMR	Life expectancy (years)
1950	69,568,000	2,826,000	1,505,000	1,321,000	40.6	21.6	19.0	5.19	189.1	39.40
1951	71,019,000	2,926,000	1,522,000	1,404,000	41.2	21.4	19.8	5.23	186.8	39.79
1952	72,571,000	3,035,000	1,517,000	1,518,000	41.8	20.9	20.9	5.27	182.0	40.69
1953	74,208,000	3,146,000	1,526,000	1,620,000	42.4	20.6	21.8	5.31	177.4	41.42
1954	75,925,000	3,257,000	1,533,000	1,723,000	42.9	20.2	22.7	5.35	172.9	42.19
1955	77,742,000	3,359,000	1,542,000	1,817,000	43.2	19.8	23.4	5.37	168.4	42.92
1956	79,662,000	3,475,000	1,544,000	1,931,000	43.6	19.4	24.2	5.41	164.0	43.80
1957	81,691,000	3,589,000	1,556,000	2,033,000	43.9	19.0	24.9	5.45	159.8	44.50
1958	83,819,000	3,701,000	1,575,000	2,126,000	44.2	18.8	25.4	5.48	155.8	45.05
1959	86,048,000	3,811,000	1,578,000	2,233,000	44.3	18.3	26.0	5.51	151.9	45.86
1960	88,383,000	3,929,000	1,593,000	2,337,000	44.5	18.0	26.4	5.55	148.3	46.45
1961	90,817,000	4,031,000	1,602,000	2,429,000	44.4	17.6	26.7	5.57	144.8	47.12
1962	93,345,000	4,127,000	1,603,000	2,523,000	44.2	17.2	27.0	5.59	141.4	47.87
1963	95,963,000	4,217,000	1,614,000	2,603,000	43.9	16.8	27.1	5.60	138.1	48.43
1964	98,675,000	4,304,000	1,609,000	2,695,000	43.6	16.3	27.3	5.61	134.8	49.23
1965	101,158,000	4,380,000	2,121,000	2,259,000	43.3	21.0	22.3	5.62	142.7	42.60
1966	103,561,000	4,426,000	1,740,000	2,686,000	42.7	16.8	25.9	5.60	129.5	48.20
1967	106,261,000	4,468,000	1,596,000	2,871,000	42.0	15.0	27.0	5.58	124.8	51.07
1968	109,139,000	4,503,000	1,594,000	2,909,000	41.3	14.6	26.7	5.54	121.4	51.63
1969	112,149,000	4,555,000	1,582,000	2,973,000	40.6	14.1	26.5	5.51	118.0	52.35
1970	115,228,000	4,596,000	1,576,000	3,021,000	39.9	13.7	26.2	5.45	114.6	52.99
1971	118,347,000	4,627,000	1,570,000	3,056,000	39.1	13.3	25.8	5.36	111.5	53.58
1972	121,504,000	4,667,000	1,560,000	3,107,000	38.4	12.8	25.6	5.29	108.4	54.24
1973	124,709,000	4,720,000	1,554,000	3,166,000	37.9	12.5	25.4	5.22	105.3	54.85
1974	127,945,000	4,727,000	1,547,000	3,180,000	37.0	12.1	24.9	5.09	102.3	55.43
1975	131,213,000	4,783,000	1,544,000	3,239,000	36.5	11.8	24.7	5.04	99.4	55.97
1976	134,521,000	4,813,000	1,540,000	3,273,000	35.8	11.5	24.3	4.92	96.8	56.51
1977	137,862,000	4,849,000	1,534,000	3,315,000	35.2	11.1	24.0	4.81	94.1	57.08
1978	141,251,000	4,908,000	1,535,000	3,373,000	34.7	10.9	23.9	4.72	91.6	57.57
1979	144,693,000	4,952,000	1,530,000	3,422,000	34.2	10.6	23.7	4.61	89.3	58.15
1980	148,177,000	4,981,000	1,521,000	3,460,000	33.6	10.3	23.4	4.49	86.9	58.75
1981	151,686,000	4,997,000	1,526,000	3,472,000	33.0	10.1	22.9	4.36	84.6	59.14
1982	155,229,000	5,036,000	1,514,000	3,522,000	32.4	9.8	22.7	4.25	82.3	59.76
1983	158,791,000	5,016,000	1,507,000	3,508,000	31.6	9.5	22.1	4.10	79.9	60.27
1984	162,332,000	4,986,000	1,502,000	3,484,000	30.7	9.3	21.5	3.94	77.6	60.73
1985	165,792,000	4,836,000	1,481,000	3,355,000	29.2	8.9	20.2	3.71	75.2	61.31
1986	169,135,000	4,736,000	1,472,000	3,264,000	28.0	8.7	19.3	3.53	72.8	61.72
1987	172,421,000	4,732,000	1,481,000	3,251,000	27.4	8.6	18.9	3.42	70.4	61.97
1988	175,695,000	4,738,000	1,495,000	3,244,000	27.0	8.5	18.5	3.33	68.0	62.21
1989	178,949,000	4,707,000	1,487,000	3,220,000	26.3	8.3	18.0	3.22	65.6	62.70
1990	182,160,000	4,647,000	1,477,000	3,170,000	25.5	8.1	17.4	3.10	63.1	63.18
1991	185,361,000	4,702,000	1,484,000	3,218,000	25.4	8.0	17.4	3.06	60.6	63.54
1992	188,558,000	4,644,000	1,468,000	3,176,000	24.6	7.8	16.8	2.94	58.1	64.13
1993	191,737,000	4,652,000	1,464,000	3,188,000	24.3	7.6	16.6	2.88	55.7	64.60
1994	194,929,000	4,681,000	1,481,000	3,201,000	24.0	7.6	16.4	2.84	53.3	64.86
1995	198,140,000	4,714,000	1,487,000	3,227,000	23.8	7.5	16.3	2.80	51.0	65.24
1996	201,374,000	4,762,000	1,519,000	3,244,000	23.6	7.5	16.1	2.77	48.9	65.36
1997	204,628,000	4,797,000	1,526,000	3,271,000	23.4	7.5	16.0	2.74	46.8	65.73
1998	207,855,000	4,744,000	1,544,000	3,200,000	22.8	7.4	15.4	2.66	44.8	65.96
1999	210,997,000	4,683,000	1,559,000	3,123,000	22.2	7.4	14.8	2.58	42.9	66.22
2000	214,072,000	4,680,000	1,581,000	3,099,000	21.9	7.4	14.5	2.54	41.1	66.43
2001	217,112,000	4,679,000	1,591,000	3,088,000	21.5	7.3	14.2	2.50	39.5	66.76
2002	220,115,000	4,662,000	1,596,000	3,066,000	21.2	7.2	13.9	2.46	37.8	67.13
2003	223,080,000	4,658,000	1,612,000	3,046,000	20.8	7.2	13.7	2.43	36.3	67.41
2004	225,939,000	4,678,000	1,807,000	2,871,000	20.8	8.1	12.7	2.42	36.9	65.75
2005	228,805,000	4,746,000	1,679,000	3,067,000	21.0	7.4	13.6	2.45	33.5	67.65
2006	231,797,000	4,819,000	1,698,000	3,121,000	20.9	7.4	13.5	2.46	32.2	67.91
2007	234,858,000	4,923,000	1,719,000	3,205,000	21.0	7.4	13.5	2.48	31.0	68.19
2008	237,937,000	4,927,000	1,763,000	3,164,000	20.5	7.4	13.1	2.44	29.8	68.23
2009	240,981,000	4,913,000	1,780,000	3,133,000	20.4	7.5	12.9	2.44	28.7	68.49
2010	244,016,000	4,920,000	1,807,000	3,112,000	20.4	7.5	12.8	2.46	27.6	68.68
2011	247,100,000	5,029,000	1,843,000	3,186,000	20.6	7.5	13.1	2.52	26.5	68.82
2012	250,223,000	5,028,000	1,875,000	3,153,000	20.4	7.5	12.9	2.51	25.6	68.97
2013	253,276,000	4,917,000	1,889,000	3,029,000	19.6	7.5	12.1	2.44	24.6	69.26
2014	256,230,000	4,857,000	1,904,000	2,953,000	19.1	7.5	11.6	2.39	23.7	69.53
2015	259,092,000	4,780,000	1,933,000	2,847,000	18.6	7.5	11.1	2.35	22.8	69.70
2016	261,850,000	4,718,000	1,972,000	2,746,000	18.1	7.5	10.6	2.31	22.0	69.80
2017	264,499,000	4,634,000	2,004,000	2,629,000	17.5	7.5	10.0	2.25	21.2	69.94
2018	267,067,000	4,588,000	2,002,000	2,586,000	17.1	7.6	9.6	2.22	20.5	70.34
2019	269,583,000	4,559,000	2,032,000	2,526,000	16.9	7.6	9.4	2.21	19.8	70.52
2020	271,858,000	4,526,000	2,437,000	2,089,000	16.7	8.8	7.8	2.19	19.2	68.81
2021	273,753,000	4,496,000	2,755,000	1,741,000	16.4	10.0	6.4	2.17	18.6	67.57
2022	278,830,000	4,518,000	2,088,000	2,429,000	16.2	7.5	8.7	2.15		
2023	281,190,000	4,482,000	2,117,000	2,364,000	15.9	7.5	8.4	2.13		
2024	283,487,000	4,468,000	2,161,000	2,307,000	15.8	7.6	8.1	2.11		
2025	285,721,000	4,441,000	2,203,000	2,237,000	15.5	7.7	7.8	2.10		

Source: UN DESA, World Population Prospects, 2022

View source data.
View source data.
View source data.
View source data.

=== Total Fertility Rate ===
Total Fertility Rate (TFR) (Wanted Fertility Rate) and Crude Birth Rate (CBR):

Year	Total		Urban		Rural	
Year	CBR	TFR	CBR	TFR	CBR	TFR
1981-1983		4.3				
1987		3.4 (3.1)		2.9 (2.6)		3.7 (3.4)
1991	25.1	3.02 (2.50)	24.0	2.60 (2.03)	25.6	3.24 (2.73)
1994		2.9 (2.4)		2.3 (1.8)		3.2 (2.7)
1997		2.8 (2.4)		2.4 (2.0)		3.0 (2.6)
2002-2003	21.9	2.6 (2.2)	22.1	2.4 (2.1)	21.7	2.7 (2.3)
2007	20.9	2.6 (2.2)	20.2	2.3 (2.0)	21.5	2.8 (2.4)
2012	20.4	2.6 (2.0)	20.1	2.4 (1.9)	20.7	2.8 (2.2)
2017	18.1	2.4 (2.1)	17.7	2.3 (1.9)	18.5	2.6 (2.2)

==== Before 1950 ====
Years	1900	1901	1902	1903	1904	1905	1906	1907	1908	1909
Total Fertility Rate in Indonesia	6.05	6.04	6.04	6.03	5.99	5.95	6.06	6.26	6.23	6.2

Years	1910	1911	1912	1913	1914	1915	1916	1917	1918	1919
Total Fertility Rate in Indonesia	6.17	6.14	6.11	6.08	5.84	5.72	5.59	5.46	5.34	5.21

Years	1920	1921	1922	1923	1924	1925	1926	1927	1928	1929	1930
Total Fertility Rate in Indonesia	5.48	5.48	5.47	5.47	5.46	5.46	5.45	5.45	5.44	5.44	5.44

Years	1931	1932	1933	1934	1935	1936	1937	1938	1939	1940
Total Fertility Rate in Indonesia	5.43	5.43	5.42	5.42	5.41	5.41	5.4	5.4	5.4	5.39

Years	1941	1942	1943	1944	1945	1946	1947	1948	1949
Total Fertility Rate in Indonesia	5.39	5.38	5.38	5.37	5.37	5.36	5.36	5.35	5.35

=== By province ===
Total fertility rate (TFR) and population over age 60 by region as of 2010:

Province	Total fertility rate		Population over age 60 (2010)
Province	2010	2020	Population over age 60 (2010)
North Sumatra	3.01	2.48	5.9
West Sumatra	2.91	2.46	8.1
Riau	2.82	2.28	4.0
Jambi	2.51	2.28	5.5
South Sumatra	2.56	2.23	6.2
Bengkulu	2.51	2.30	5.8
Lampung	2.45	2.28	7.2
Bangka Belitung	2.54	2.24	5.8
Riau Islands	2.38	2.21	3.4
Jakarta	1.82	1.75	5.1
West Java	2.43	2.11	7.0
Central Java	2.20	2.09	10.3
Yogyakarta	1.94	1.89	12.9
East Java	2.00	1.98	10.4
Banten	2.35	2.01	4.6
Bali	2.13	2.04	9.7
East Nusa Tenggara	3.82	2.79	7.4
West Kalimantan	2.64	2.33	5.8
Central Kalimantan	2.56	2.31	4.6
South Kalimantan	2.35	2.31	5.8
East Kalimantan	2.61	2.18	4.0
North Sulawesi	2.43	2.10	8.4
Central Sulawesi	2.94	2.32	6.6
South Sulawesi	2.55	2.22	8.2
Southeast Sulawesi	3.20	2.57	5.8
Gorontalo	2.76	2.30	5.9
West Sulawesi	3.33	2.58	6.2
Maluku	3.56	2.52	6.2
North Maluku	3.35	2.47	4.8
West Papua	3.18	2.66	3.2
Papua	2.87	2.76	2.4

== Marriages and Divorces ==
Marriages and Divorces in Indonesia
Year	Mid-year population	Marriages	Divorces
2007	234,858,000	1,944,569	175,713
2008	237,937,000	2,194,037	193,189
2009	240,981,000	2,162,115	223,371
2010	238,518,800	2,207,224	285,184
2011	247,100,000	2,319,821	276,791
2012	250,223,000	2,289,648	346,480
2013	253,276,000	2,210,046	324,247
2014	256,230,000	2,110,776	344,237
2015	255,587,500	1,958,394	347,256
2016	258,496,500	1,837,185	365,633
2018	264,161,600	2,016,171	408,202
2019	266,911,900	1,968,978	439,002
2020	270,203,900	1,780,346	291,677
2021	272,682,500	1,742,049	447,743
2022	275,773,000	1,705,348	516,344
2023	278,696,200	1,577,255	463,654
2024	281,603,800	1,478,302	394,608
2025	284,438,800	1,480,048	438,168

Note: No data is available for 2017.

== Ethnic groups ==
Ethnic groups	Percentage
Javanese	40.06%
Sundanese	15.51%
Malay	3.70%
Batak	3.58%
Madurese	3.03%
Betawi	2.88%
Minangkabau	2.73%
Bugis	2.71%
Bantenese	1.96%
Banjarese	1.74%
Balinese	1.66%
Acehnese	1.44%
Dayak	1.36%
Sasak	1.34%

Indonesia is a country of great ethnic diversity, with approximately 600 distinct indigenous ethnic groups living side by side across more than 17,000 islands. The majority of Indonesia's population is descended from Austronesian peoples who are concentrated in western and central Indonesia, which is part of the Asian continent. Another large group is the Melanesian peoples, who inhabit the eastern part of Indonesia (the Maluku Islands, Western New Guinea, and the East Nusa Tenggara) in Oceania.

The Javanese are the largest ethnic group, accounting for 40.2% of the population and are culturally, economically, and politically dominant. The Javanese are concentrated in Java, the most populous island, especially in the central and eastern parts, and also in significant numbers in most provinces due to extensive migration throughout the archipelago. The Sundanese are the next largest group (15.4%), followed by the Malays, Batak, Madurese, Betawi, Minangkabau, and Bugis. A sense of Indonesian nationalism is present along with strong ethnic and regional identities.

== Languages ==
Indonesian is the official and national language of Indonesia, widely spoken by over 97% of the population. However, Indonesia is a highly multilingual country. According to Ethnologue, there are currently 737 regional languages spoken across the Indonesian archipelago. This extensive linguistic diversity accounts for about 10% of the world’s total languages, making Indonesia the second most linguistically diverse country in the world. The majority of these languages belong to the Austronesian language family, which is prevalent in the western and central regions of Indonesia, including languages such as Acehnese, Batak, Sundanese, Balinese, Banjarese and Buginese. In contrast, the eastern regions, particularly Papua and the Maluku Islands, are home to over 270 Papuan languages, which are distinct from the Austronesian language family and represent a unique linguistic heritage. The most widely spoken language as a mother tongue is Javanese, spoken by over 80 million speakers, mainly in central and east Java, but also on many other islands due to migration.

== Religion ==
Religion in Indonesia (2025)
1. Islam (87.2%)
2. Protestantism (7.37%)
3. Roman Catholic (3.07%)
4. Hinduism (1.66%)
5. Buddhism, Confucianism, and indigenous beliefs (0.75%)

Indonesia is the world's most populous Muslim-majority nation; based on civil registration data in 2025 from Ministry of Home Affairs, 87.15% of Indonesians are Muslims, 10.44% Christians (7.37% Protestants, 3.07% Roman Catholic), 1.66% Hindu, 0.75% Buddhists, Confucians and indigenous beliefs. Most Indonesian Hindus are Balinese and most Buddhists in modern-day Indonesia are Chinese.

== See also ==
- Census in Indonesia
- Culture of Indonesia
- Native Indonesians
- Overseas Indonesians
- Transmigration program

== Sources ==
- Ananta, Aris; Arifin, Evi Nurvidya; Hasbullah, M Sairi; Handayani, Nur Budi; Pramono, Agus (2015). Demography of Indonesia's Ethnicity. Institute of Southeast Asian Studies. ISBN 978-981-4519-87-8.
