= 1930 Dutch East Indies census =

Last colonial census in the Dutch East Indies

Census of 1930 in Netherlands India
← 1920	1930	1961 →
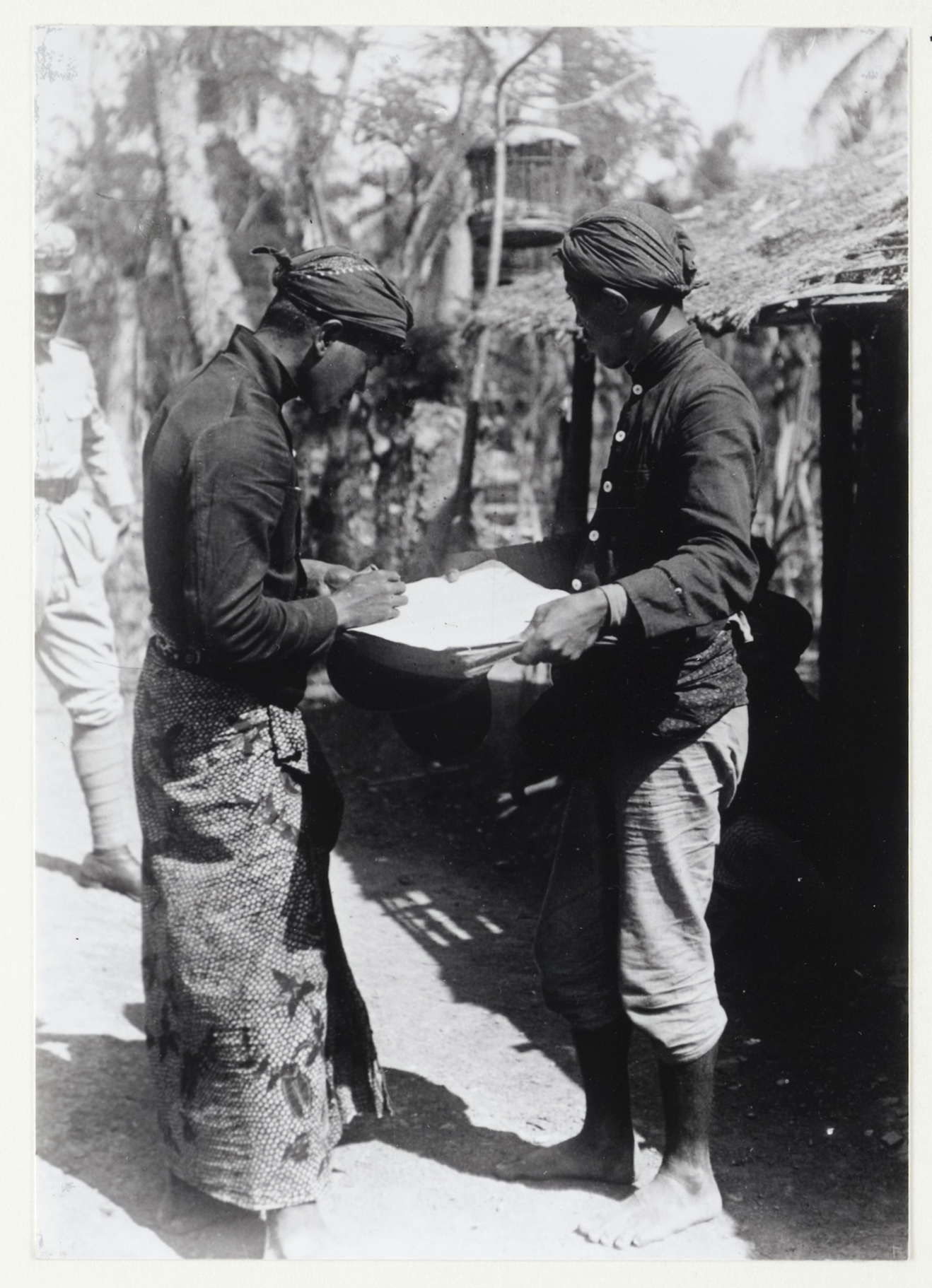
- Census workers in Rembang

General information
- Country: Dutch East Indies

Results
- Total population: 60,727,233
- Most populous region: Central Java and Vorstenlanden (15,265,504)
- Least populous region: Maluku Islands and Western New Guinea (893,400)

The 1930 Dutch East Indies census (Dutch: Volkstelling 1930) was the last census of the Dutch East Indies. The total population was enumerated to be 60,727,233. Its population density in 1930 was 31.9 inhabitants/km^{2}.
