= 1980 Indonesian census =

1980 Population Census Sensus Penduduk 1980
- 31 October 1980
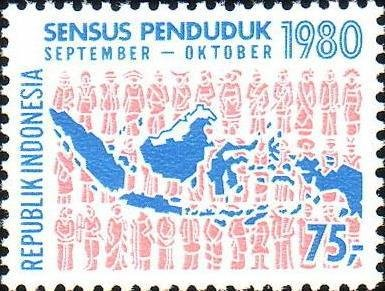
- Postage stamp commemorating the census

General information
- Country: Indonesia
- Authority: Central Bureau of Statistics

Results
- Total population: 147,490,298 (▲23.7%)
- Most populous province: East Java (29,188,852)
- Least populous province: Bengkulu (768,064)

The 1980 Indonesian census was the third census of Indonesia as a sovereign state. It enumerated a total population of 147,490,298. Its population density during the 1980 census was 77.4 inhabitants/km^{2}.

It was the first Indonesian census to be held in a year ending with the number 0, as opposed to the first two censuses (1961 and 1971 censuses), which both held in a year ending with the number 1.
