= 1971 Indonesian census =

1971 Population Census Sensus Penduduk 1971
← 1961	24 September 1971	1980 →

General information
- Country: Indonesia
- Authority: Central Bureau of Statistics

Results
- Total population: 119,208,229 (▲22.9%)
- Most populous province: East Java (25,516,999)
- Least populous province: Bengkulu (519,316)

The 1971 Indonesian census was the second census of Indonesia as a sovereign state. It enumerated a total population of 119,208,229. Its population density during the 1971 census was 62.6 inhabitants/km^{2}.

It was the last and the only two Indonesian censuses held in a year ending with the number 1, the other the first 1961 census. The following census held in 1980 and onwards held in a year ending with the number 0.
