= Al-Baitul Amien Mosque =

Mosque in Jember, East Java, Indonesia

- Masjid Jami' Al-Baitul Amien
- View of the central dome, 2014

Religion
- Affiliation: Islam
- Branch/tradition: Sunni

Location
- Location: Jember, East Java, Indonesia
- Interactive map of Al-Baitul Amien Mosque
- Coordinates: 8°10′6″S 113°42′2″E

Architecture
- Architect: Yaying Kaliefadi Kesser
- Type: Mosque
- Established: 1976

Specifications
- Dome: 7
- Minaret: 1

The Al-Baitul Amien Mosque (Indonesian: Masjid Jami' Al-Baitul Amien) is a mosque located near the alun-alun (town square) of Jember, East Java, Indonesia. The complex consists of two buildings, a colonial-era mosque erected before 1894 and a seven-domed design dedicated in 1976. The former is now used as a school. The latter, meanwhile, was designed by the Surabaya-based architect Yaying Kaliefadi Kesser and has been described as resembling the Parliamentary Complex in Jakarta. The seven-domed design is replete with references to various aspects of Islam, including the seven heavens, five pillars, and three elements of faith, submission, and creating beauty.

== Description ==
The Al-Baitul Amien Mosque is located in Jember, East Java, Indonesia, with the street address 2 Sultan Agung Street, Jember Lor, Patrang. It is located near the alun-alun (town square), and fronted with a courtyard of hollow ceramic bricks. The mosque has a capacity of 2,000–3,000 within the domes, with another 5,000 congregants able to be accommodated in the courtyard.

The original mosque offered a combination of indigenous, European, and Arabic architecture. The current mosque, situated to the north of the old mosque, consists of seven interconnected domes, symbolizing the seven heavens of Islamic cosmology. These domes cover almost the entirety of the rooms underneath, and include a single five-sided minaret reaching 32.9 metres (108 ft) in height. Due to the interlocking dome design, the mosque is popularly known as masjid keong ("snail mosque") among local residents.

The central dome, which has a diameter of 34 metres (112 ft) and maximum height of 14.585 metres (47.85 ft), contains two storeys. The second story is supported by seventeen pillars, each measuring 6 metres (20 ft) in height and approximately 2 metres (6 ft 7 in) in circumference. The number of pillars symbolizes both the date of Indonesian independence (17 August 1945) and one potential date for Muhammad's first revelation (17 Ramadan). The mihrab in this dome consists of three arches, symbolizing faith, submission, and creating beauty. Over the main arch, Verse 14 of the Surah Ta-Ha is written, while the names of Allah and the Prophet Muhammad are written over the left and right arches. Around the dome, the Surah An-Nur is written. Its floor is made of carrara marble from Italy.

The next largest domes, to the left and right of the main dome, have a diameter of 20 metres (66 ft) and a maximum height of 8.43 metres (27.7 ft). The next largest domes, further to the left and right, have a diameter of 11 metres (36 ft) and a maximum height of 5.95 metres (19.5 ft). These four domes are also used for worship. Together with the central dome, these five worship spaces are intended to symbolize the five mandatory prayers as well as the five pillars of Islam. At the outside left and right are the two smallest domes, containing space for wudu (ablution). These domes are 8 metres (26 ft) in diameter and rise to a height of 4.22 metres (13.8 ft) Water for ablution is taken from fountains lining the inside wall of the domes as well as a central pillar.

== History ==
Interior view of the central dome, showing the three-arched mihrab

The original Al-Baitul Amien Mosque is recorded as early as 19 December 1894, when a colonial registrar listed it as sitting on 2,760 square metres (29,700 sq ft) of eigendom land. This building received renovations in 1939 and in 1973. In the 1960s, Speaker of the Jember Parliament Soewarno Soetopamekas raised funds for further renovations. The regional government thus requested that residents donate used bottles, which were then sold.

Plans were made to construct a new mosque in the 1970s, and the Jember regency government called for submissions through a contest. Thirteen designs were chosen for display to the public. Polls found that the most popular design was that submitted by Yaying Kaliefadi Kesser, a Surabaya-based non-Muslim architect who had studied in the United States. Rather than use the blended architecture style of the earlier mosque, Yaying drew primarily from modern European architecture. This was inspired in part by a request of the regent of Jember, Abdul Hadi, who sought a mosque like no other. The design has been likened by several journalists to the Parliamentary Complex in Jakarta, the nation's capital.

Construction was funded partially through the contributions of the local populace, with 11 tonnes (11 long tons; 12 short tons) of unhulled rice collected in donations. The mosque was officially dedicated on 3 May 1976, with Minister of Religion Mukti Ali presiding. Worship activities thus moved to the new mosque, while the previous building was used by the Al-Baitul Amien Foundation as an elementary school.

In 2022, the mosque underwent extensive renovations funded by Kasih Fajarini, the wife of incumbent regent Hendy Siswanto. The previous green color scheme was replaced with a white-and-gold one. The gates, courtyard, and fence were also replaced, as were the doors. Aside from the worship spaces, the mosque contains classrooms and meeting spaces that are used for religious activities such as studying Islam (pengajian) and tausiyah (informal proselytization). The mosque is frequently used for social events, and is a destination for religious tourism in the region.

== Works cited ==
- Ijal, Maulana (10 April 2022). "Masjid Jami' Al-Baitul Amien Desainnya Berbeda dari Masjid di Dunia" [The Design of the Al-Baitul Amien Mosque Is Unlike Other Mosques around the World]. Radar Jember (in Indonesian). Archived from the original on 20 February 2026.
- "Indahnya Arsitektur Masjid Jami' Jember, Begini Sejarahnya" [The Beauty of the Jami' Mosque in Jember, Here Is Its History]. Surabaya Today (in Indonesian). 9 April 2023. Archived from the original on 20 February 2026.
- Permani, Anggi Widya (3 June 2025). "Salat Iduladha Masjid Baitul Amien, Ini Persiapannya" [Idul-Adha Prayers at Masjid Baitul Amien, These Are the Preparations] (in Indonesian). Radio Republik Indonesia. Archived from the original on 21 February 2026.
- Siswanto, Dwi (3 November 2025). "Masjid Jamik Jember, Tergolong Masjid Terunik, bahkan Orang Mengira Gedung DPR MPR" [The Jamik Mosque in Jember, One of the Most Unique Mosques, Sometimes People Even Think It's Parliament]. Halo Jember (in Indonesian). Archived from the original on 20 February 2026.
- Solichah, Zumrotun (14 April 2023). "Keunikan Arsitektur Masjid Al Baitul Amien Jember Mirip Gedung MPR DPR" [The Unique Architecture of Al-Baitul Amien Mosque in Jember, Resembles the Parliament Building]. Antara (in Indonesian). Archived from the original on 15 April 2023.
- Yudianto, Erfan; Febriyanti, Rizka Amalia; Sunardi, Sunardi; Sugiarti, Titik; Mutrofin, Mutrofin (2021). "Eksplorasi Etnomatematika pada Masjid Jami' Al-Baitul Amien Jember" (PDF). Ethnomathematics Journal. 2: 11–20. doi:10.21831/ej.v2i1.36329.
