= Slateng =

- Location in East Java and Indonesia Slateng (Indonesia)
- Coordinates: 8°7′56.6688″S 113°59′0.9852″E
- Country: Indonesia
- Province: East Java
- Regency: Jember Regency
- District: Ledokombo District
- Elevation: 4,488 ft (1,368 m)

Population (2010)
  - Total: 8,630
- Time zone: UTC+7 (Western Indonesia Time)

Slateng is a village in Ledokombo District, Jember Regency in East Java Province. Its population is 8630.

== Climate ==
Slateng has a subtropical highland climate (Cfb). It has moderate rainfall from June to October and heavy to very heavy rainfall from November to May.

Climate data for Slateng
Month	Jan	Feb	Mar	Apr	May	Jun	Jul	Aug	Sep	Oct	Nov	Dec	Year
Mean daily maximum °C (°F)	22.1 (71.8)	22.1 (71.8)	22.2 (72.0)	22.4 (72.3)	22.6 (72.7)	21.8 (71.2)	21.3 (70.3)	21.5 (70.7)	22.1 (71.8)	23.1 (73.6)	22.6 (72.7)	22.3 (72.1)	22.2 (71.9)
Daily mean °C (°F)	17.9 (64.2)	17.8 (64.0)	17.9 (64.2)	17.7 (63.9)	17.8 (64.0)	16.7 (62.1)	15.9 (60.6)	16.3 (61.3)	16.8 (62.2)	17.4 (63.3)	17.8 (64.0)	17.9 (64.2)	17.3 (63.2)
Mean daily minimum °C (°F)	13.8 (56.8)	13.6 (56.5)	13.6 (56.5)	13.0 (55.4)	13.0 (55.4)	11.7 (53.1)	10.6 (51.1)	11.1 (52.0)	11.5 (52.7)	11.8 (53.2)	13.0 (55.4)	13.5 (56.3)	12.5 (54.5)
Average precipitation mm (inches)	425 (16.7)	376 (14.8)	379 (14.9)	204 (8.0)	158 (6.2)	87 (3.4)	58 (2.3)	38 (1.5)	55 (2.2)	107 (4.2)	221 (8.7)	392 (15.4)	2,500 (98.3)
Source: Climate-Data.org
