= 2024 Jember regency election =

- 27 November 2024
- Turnout: 56.85%
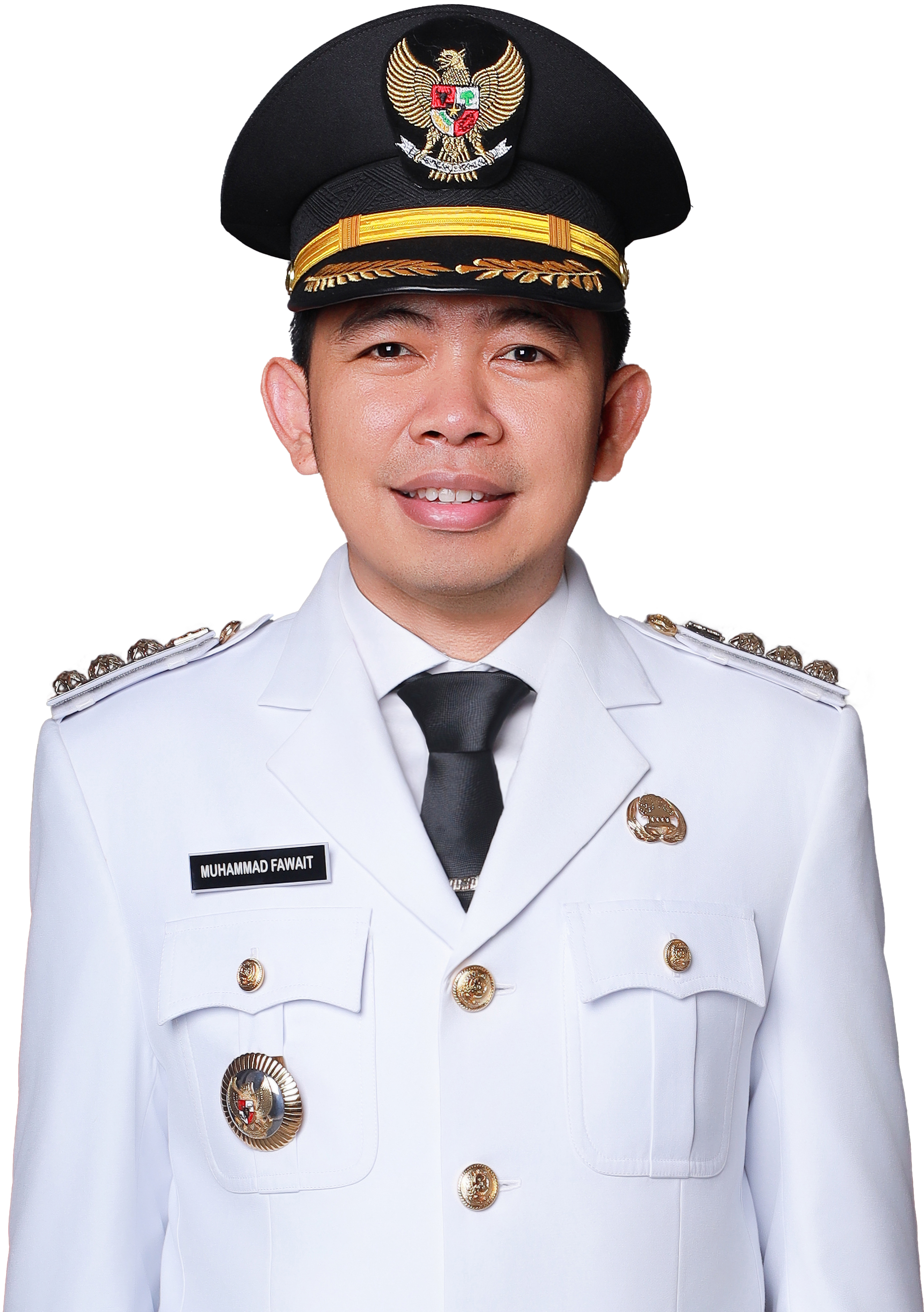

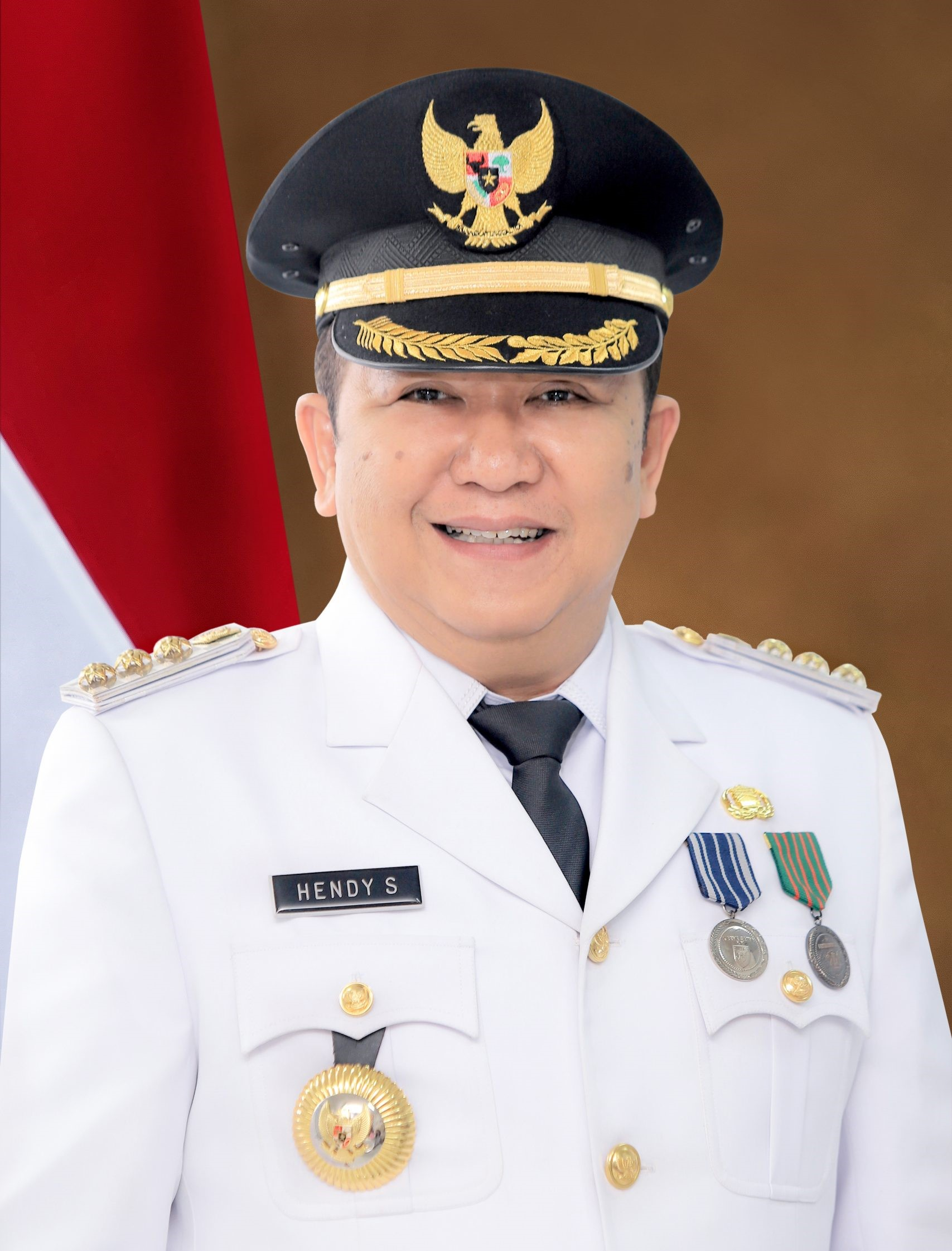
Candidate	Muhammad Fawait	Hendy Siswanto
Party	Gerindra	PDI-P
Running mate	Djoko Susanto	Balya Firjaun Barlaman
Popular vote	588,761	495,499
Percentage	54.30%	45.70%
- Results by district, subdistrict and village
Regent before election
Hendy Siswanto
PDI-P
Elected Regent
Muhammad Fawait
Gerindra

The 2024 Jember regency election was held on 27 November 2024 as part of nationwide local elections to elect the regent and vice of Jember Regency for a five-year term. The previous election was held in 2020. Muhammad Fawait of the Gerindra Party won the election, receiving 54% of the vote. He defeated the incumbent regent, Hendy Siswanto of the Indonesian Democratic Party of Struggle (PDI-P), who received 45%.

== Electoral system ==
The election, like other local elections in 2024, follow the first-past-the-post system where the candidate with the most votes wins the election, even if they do not win a majority. It is possible for a candidate to run uncontested, in which case the candidate is still required to win a majority of votes "against" an "empty box" option. Should the candidate fail to do so, the election will be repeated on a later date.

== Candidates ==
According to electoral regulations, in order to qualify for the election, candidates were required to secure support from a political party or a coalition of parties controlling 10 seats in the Jember Regional House of Representatives (DPRD). The Gerindra Party, with 10 seats from the 2024 legislative election, is the only party eligible to nominate a candidate without forming coalitions with other parties. Candidates may alternatively demonstrate support in form of photocopies of identity cards, which in Jember's case corresponds to 142,458 copies. One candidate, Jaddin Wadajs (grandson of former Nahdlatul Ulama leader Ahmad Shiddiq) registered less than 30 minutes before the deadline, and submitted the required proofs of support. His candidacy is pending General Elections Commission (KPU) verification.

=== Potential ===
The following are individuals who have either been publicly mentioned as a potential candidate by a political party in the DPRD, publicly declared their candidacy with press coverage, or considered as a potential candidate by media outlets:

- Hendy Siswanto (Nasdem), incumbent regent.
- Faida, former regent of Jember (2016–2021).
- Muhammad Fawait (Gerindra), chairman of Gerindra's parliamentary group in the East Java Regional House of Representatives.
- Jaddin Wadajs, grandson of former NU leader Ahmad Shiddiq.

== Political map ==
Following the 2024 Indonesian legislative election, eight political parties are represented in the Jember DPRD:

Political parties	Seat count
Great Indonesia Movement Party (Gerindra)	10 / 50
National Awakening Party (PKB)	8 / 50
Indonesian Democratic Party of Struggle (PDI-P)	8 / 50
Party of Functional Groups (Golkar)	6 / 50
NasDem Party	6 / 50
Prosperous Justice Party (PKS)	6 / 50
United Development Party (PPP)	5 / 50
National Mandate Party (PAN)	1 / 50

== Results ==
Candidate	Running mate	Party	Votes	%
Muhammad Fawait	Djoko Susanto	Gerindra Party	588,761	54.30
Hendy Siswanto	Balya Firjaun Barlaman	Indonesian Democratic Party of Struggle	495,499	45.70
Total			1,084,260	100.00
Valid votes			1,084,260	97.55
Invalid/blank votes			27,232	2.45
Total votes			1,111,492	100.00
Registered voters/turnout			1,955,219	56.85
Source: KPU
