= Jenggawah, Jember =

Coordinates: 8°15′14.14″S 113°40′29.41″E

Jenggawah District is an administrative district (kecamatan) in southern Jember Regency, in East Java Province of Indonesia which has a small hill in the center of district.

== Description ==
People in this area call the district "Jenewa" (from the acronym from Jenggawah) and they call themselves "wonk Jenewa" (Jenewa citizens).

The district has many Islamic boarding schools. The favourite school in this area is TK Negeri Pembina Jenggawah, SD Negeri 1 Jenggawah.

The majority of people work as farmers and traders.
