= Panjebar Semangat =

Indonesian culture magazine

- Editor-in-Chief: Arkandi Sari
- Categories: Culture
- Frequency: Weekly
- Founder: Soetomo
- First issue: 2 September 1933
- Company: PT Pancaran Semangat Jaya
- Country: Indonesia
- Based in: Surabaya
- Language: Javanese
- Website: panjebarsemangat.id
- ISSN: 0215-2924

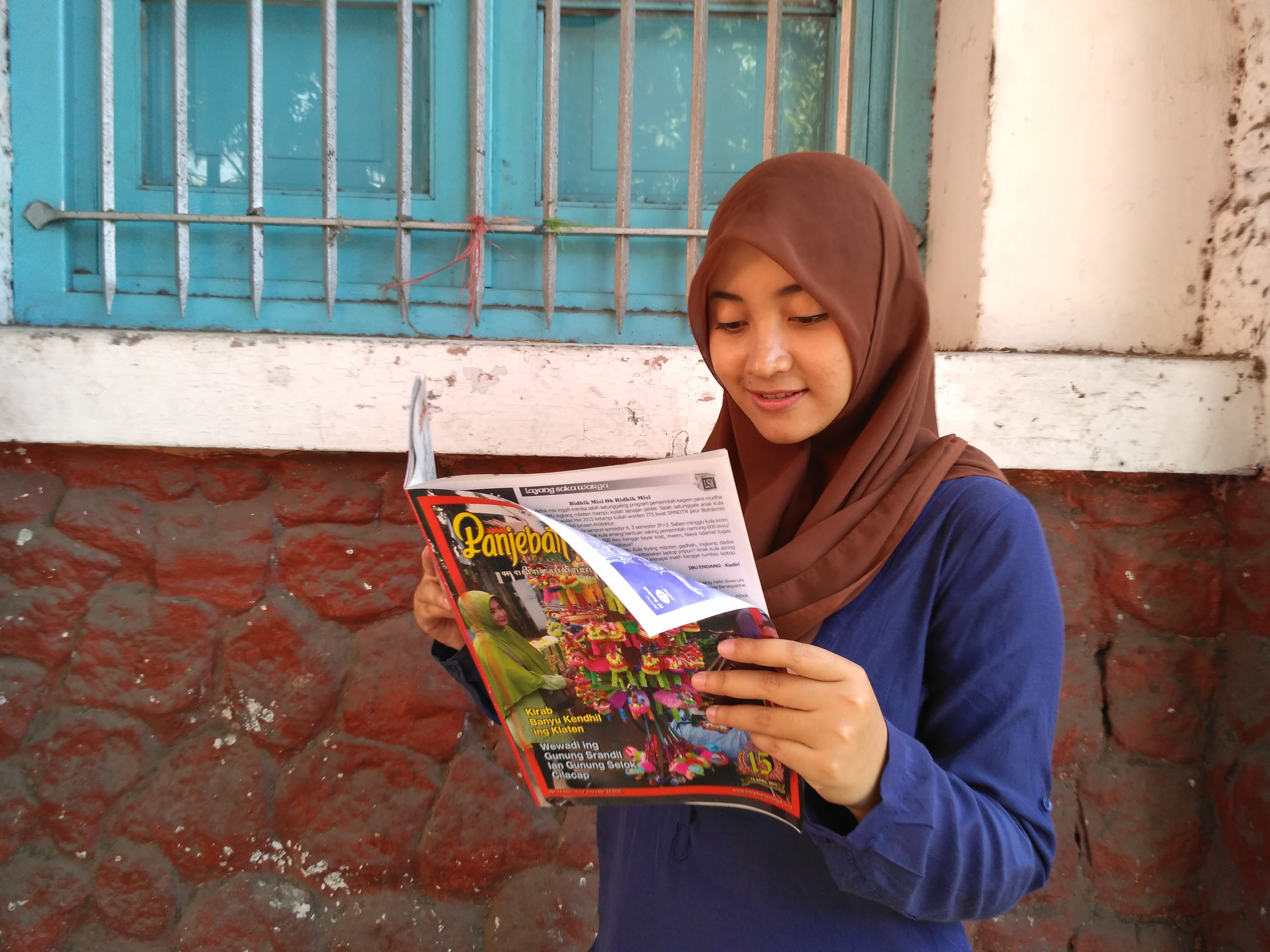
Girl reading Panjebar Semangat

Panjebar Semangat (Spread the Spirit) is a Javanese language Indonesian weekly culture magazine.

== History ==
It was first published on 2 September 1933.

Panjebar Semangat provided articles on culture and is published on a weekly basis. During the Japanese occupation of the Dutch East Indies, this magazine was not published until 1949.
