= Solo Batik Carnival =

Annual fashion carnival in Solo, Indonesia

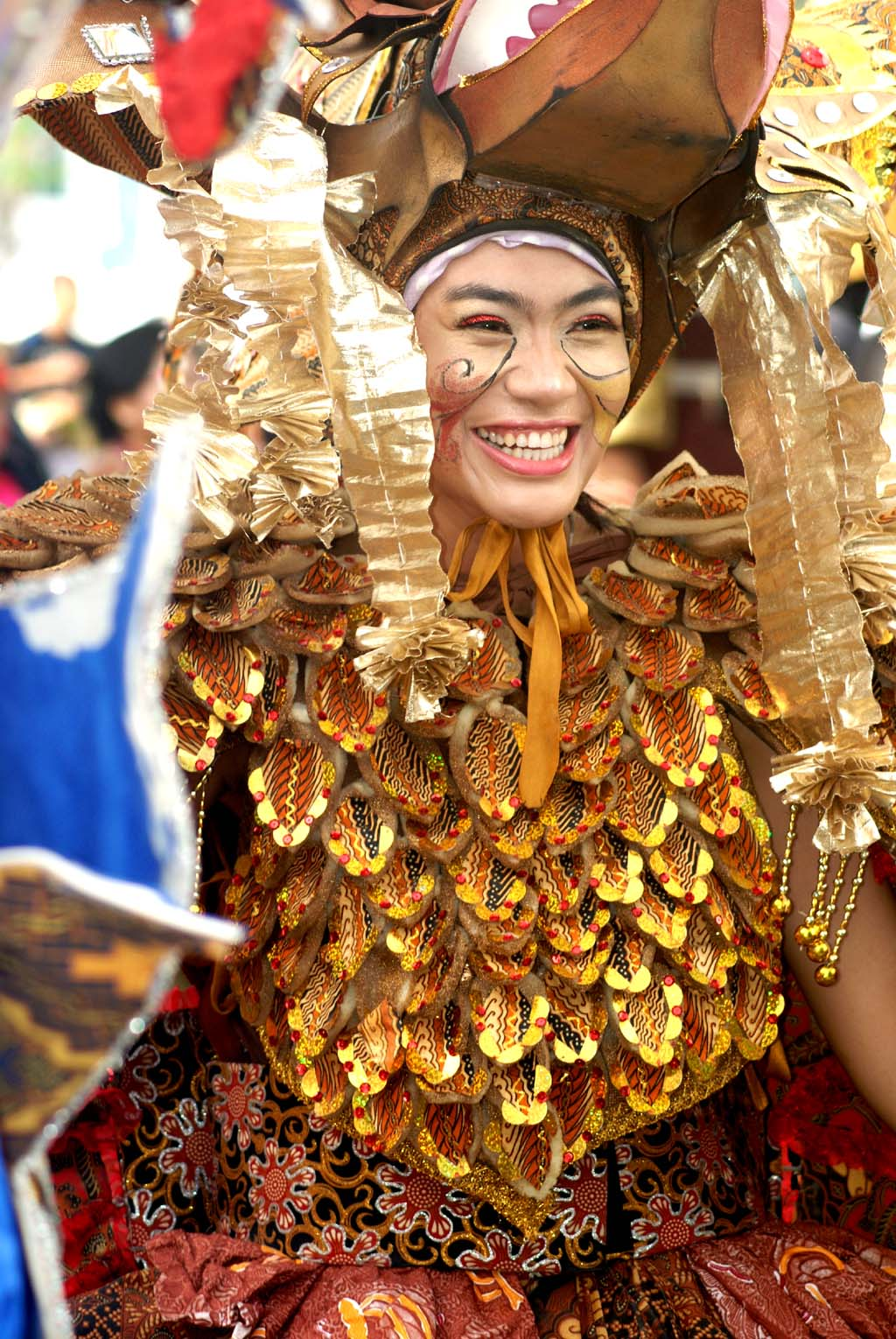
Solo Batik Carnival in 2010.

The Solo Batik Carnival or SBC (Indonesian Karnaval Batik Solo) is an annual carnival held in Solo City (Surakarta City), Indonesia. The word "carnival" here is not related with the Christian pre-Lent celebration, but more of a festivities in general, with procession of dancers in extravagant costumes, with emphasis on the Indonesian motif of batik.

== Solo Batik Carnival 2008 ==
The first Solo Batik Carnival was held on April 13, 2008 along the main street of Solo City, Slamet Riyadi Street.

== Solo Batik Carnival 2009 ==
The second Solo Batik Carnival was held on June 28, 2009 along the same route, Slamet Riyadi Street. The second carnival used the theme "Topeng/Mask". The carnival featured around 300 performers incorporating masks into their acts, which took place along the 4 kilometers route through the city.

The carnival presented three styles of traditional masks, which are associated with particular mythological characters. The Panji masks represent a king or a queen along with gentleness and beauty, the Kelana masks represent knights or evil giants and the Gecul masks represent punakawan or royal servants.

== Solo Batik Carnival 2010 ==
The third Solo Batik Carnival was held on June 23, 2010. The theme of the carnival was "Sekar Jagad". Around 300 participants attended the festival.

== Solo Batik Carnival 2011 ==
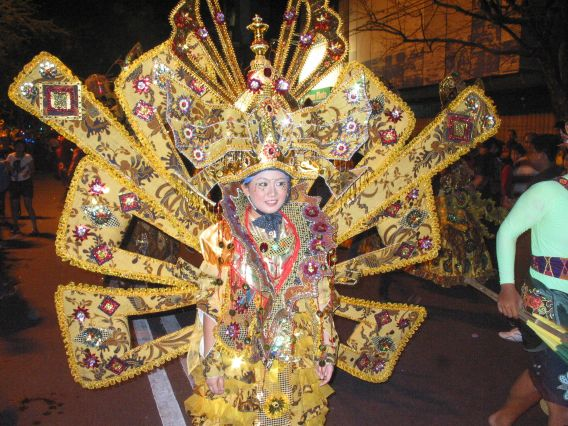
The fourth Solo Batik Carnival was the first to be held in the evening.

The fourth Solo Batik Carnival was held on Saturday evening 25 June 2011 on the main street of Solo, Slamet Riyadi Street. The theme of the year is "The Amazing Legend". The Carnival highlighted four of the most renowned Javanese folk-legends: the Ande Ande Lumut, Ratu Kencana Wungu, Ratu Laut Selatan, and Roro Jonggrang. The event also highlighted the appearance of four winners of the Miss Indonesia beauty pageant: Nadine Ames, Inda Adeliani, Alessandra K Usman, and Reisa Kartikasari.

The event was attended by the Mayor of Solo, Joko Widodo, and vice Mayor Hadi Rudyatmo, who both followed the parade on foot from the start to the finish-line at the Solo City Hall, wearing distinguished costumes normally worn only by the nobility.

== Solo Batik Carnival 2019 ==
2019 carnival themed as Suvarna Bhumi: The Golden of ASEAN. Delegations from 11 Southeast Asian countries, namely Indonesia, Malaysia, Philippines, Brunei Darussalam, Singapore, Myanmar, Vietnam, Laos, Cambodia, Thailand and Timor Leste, showcased traditional outfits from their countries and kicked off the event with various artistic performances.

== See also ==
- Jember Fashion Carnival
