= SMK PGRI 05 Jember =

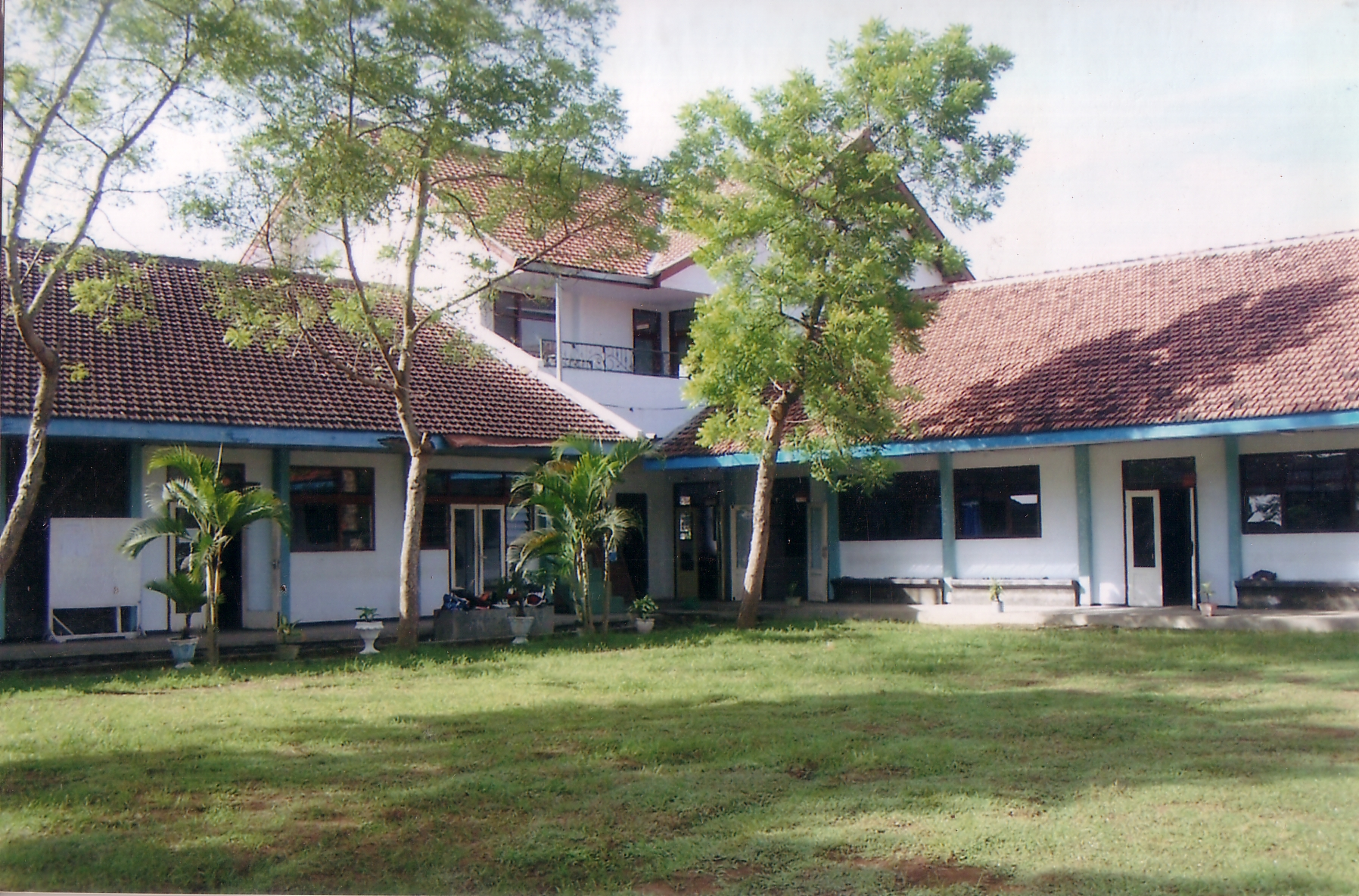
- Jalan Krakatau No. 60, Kencong, Jember, East Java; Indonesia

Information
- Type: Public school
- Established: 1970
- School number: 050901407075
- Headmaster: Drs. Sujono
- Staff: 30

SMK PGRI 05 Jember is a vocational high school in Kencong, Jember, East Java, Indonesia. In 2009, it had 19 male teachers and 11 female teachers.

The school has specialized programmes in secretarial studies, accounting, and sales.
