= Jember Fashion Carnaval =

Costume carnival in Jember, Indonesia

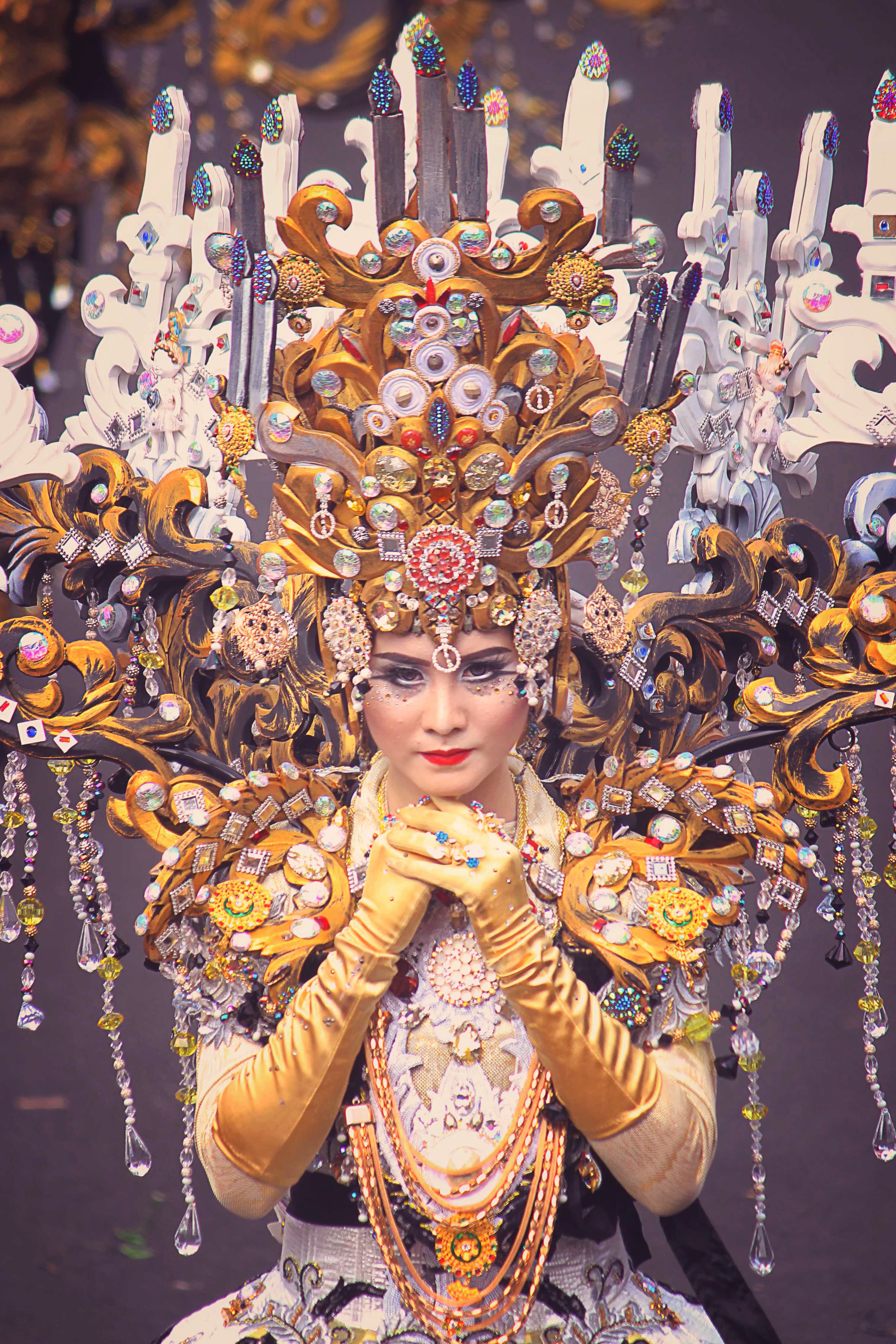
The Jember Fashion Carnaval in 2016

Jember Fashion Carnaval or JFC (Indonesian Karnaval Busana Jember) is an annual carnival held in the East Java city of Jember. It is officially written as Jember Fashion Carnaval; the word carnival here is officially spelled as carnaval, probably a confusion with the Indonesian spelling karnaval, or an influence of the Dutch spelling carnaval. Jember Fashion Carnival has no relation with the Christian pre-Lenten festival, but more of a festivities in general, roughly following the Brazilian style and the Canary Islands style. The festival presents a performance of dancers in extravagant costumes, emphasising the traditional Indonesian motif and style.

Generally, the carnival used world-themed fashion or nature-inspired theme. Preparation was held extensively months before and participants volunteered for the event.

The idea for Jember Fashion Carnaval was initiated by local fashion designer and educator, Dynand Fariz. Initially, a world-themed fashion week known as Pekan Mode Dynand Fariz was held in 2001. In 2002, the fashion week was held around the city of Jember. This has inspired the creation of Jember Fashion Carnaval. The first Jember Fashion Carnaval was held on January 1, 2003, the same date as the founding day of Jember City. It was followed by another Jember Fashion Carnaval in August 2003. Since then the carnival is held on the month of August.

Before JFC was held, Reyog Ponorogo's performance would crowd the road around the city in the current cultural pageantry and celebration of the anniversary of the independence of Jember City. It has always attracted the attention of citizens each year. Thus, the founder of JFC created the idea of a walking parade with the participants wearing interesting costumes, lively, bright colors, and presenting the identity of Jember.

From 2001 to the beginning of the Jember Carnaval Festival, there wasn't much difference in concept from the previous procession. Therefore, the shape of JFC costumes always resembled Reyog at which time there was also a similar event, such as a costume festival in the countries in the American continent. Even today, Many Reyog Ponorogo groups in Jember still participate and support the JFC activities each year.

Even in the development, JFC is still carrying the national Reyog event and Reyog mini. Participants are now not followed by adults only, but the students of students kindergarten, elementary, and junior high school which is more commonly called participants JFC Mini.

== See also ==
- Solo Batik Carnival
