= Nusa Barong =

Island in Indonesia

Coordinates: 8.4667°S 113.3330°E

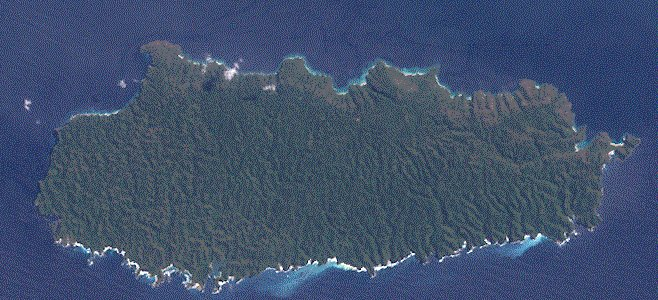
- Satellite image of Nusa Barong Island

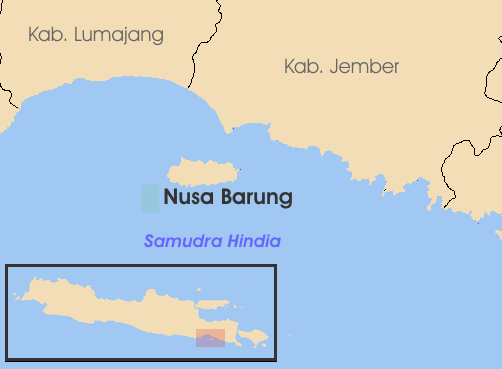
- Map of Nusa Barong Island

Geography
- Location: South East Asia
- Archipelago: Greater Sunda Islands
- Area: 84.73 km^{2} (32.71 sq mi)

Administration
- Indonesia
- Province: East Java

Nusa Barong is an island of 84.73 km^{2} area, located south of Java, and is part of Puger District of Jember Regency, East Java Province, in Indonesia. In mid 2023 it had a population of 16,156, all living in coastal settlements.
