= Javanese New Caledonians =

Ethnic group

Total population
- 4,300

Languages
- New Caledonian Javanese · French · Indonesian · other New Caledonian languages

Related ethnic groups
- Javanese, Austronesian people

Javanese New Caledonians are an ethnic group of full or partial Javanese descent who reside in New Caledonia. They arrived between 1896 and 1949. They were sent as plantation workers administered by the Dutch colonial government in New Caledonia.

They comprise less than 1.6% of New Caledonia's population. The Javanese diaspora extends to Suriname, Malaysia and Singapore.

Most Javanese New Caledonians cannot speak Indonesian (but some of them master it as a third language via interactions with expatriate Javanese Indonesians and to a lesser extent intermarriage) but are fluent in New Caledonian Javanese.

== See also ==
- Javanese people
