= Muhammad Fawait =

Indonesian politician (born 1988)

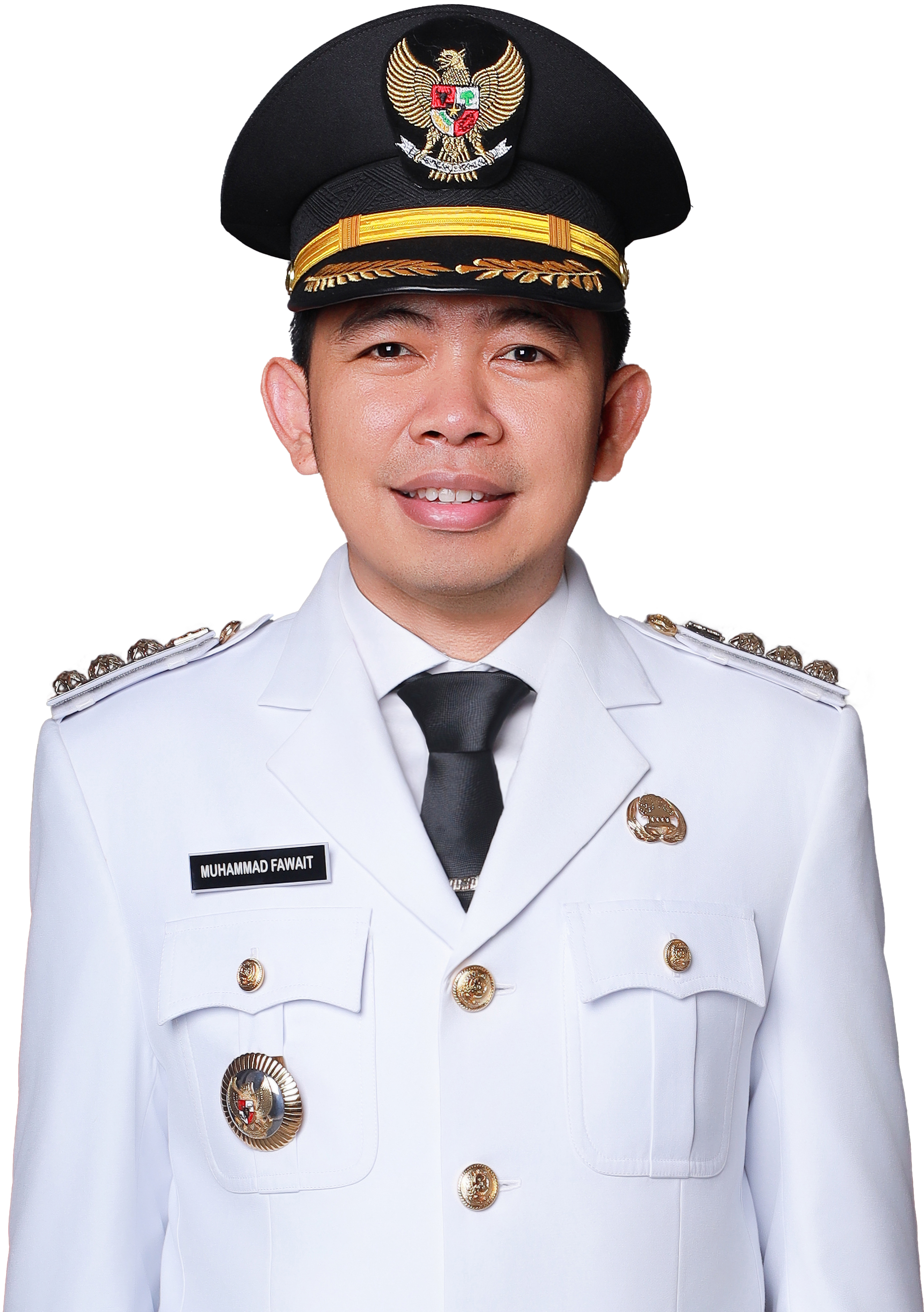

19th Regent of Jember
- Incumbent
- Assumed office 20 February 2025
- President: Prabowo Subianto
- Governor: Khofifah Indar Parawansa
- Deputy: Djoko Susanto
- Preceded by: Hendy Siswanto

Personal details
- Born: February 8, 1988 (age 38) Jember, East Java
- Party: Gerindra Party
- Spouse: Ghyta Eka Puspita
- Children: 2
- Education: Airlangga University (S.E.); Gadjah Mada University (M.Sc.)
- Profession: Politician

Muhammad Fawait or also familiarly called Gus Fawait (born 8 February 1988) is an Indonesian politician from the Gerindra Party who served as Regent of Jember for the 2025–2030 term. He served since 20 February 2025 after being inaugurated by President Prabowo Subianto at the Istana Negara, Jakarta. Previously, he served a member of the East Java Regional House of Representatives for the 2014–2019 and 2019–2024 term.

In the 2024 Jember regency election, Gus Fawait ran for Regent of Jember for the 2025–2030 term, partnering with Djoko Susanto. This pair of candidates won, winning 588.761 votes or 54,30% of the total valid votes.

Political offices
Preceded by Hendy Siswanto	Regent of Jember; 2025–present	Succeeded by Incumbent
