= Hendy Siswanto =

Indonesian politician

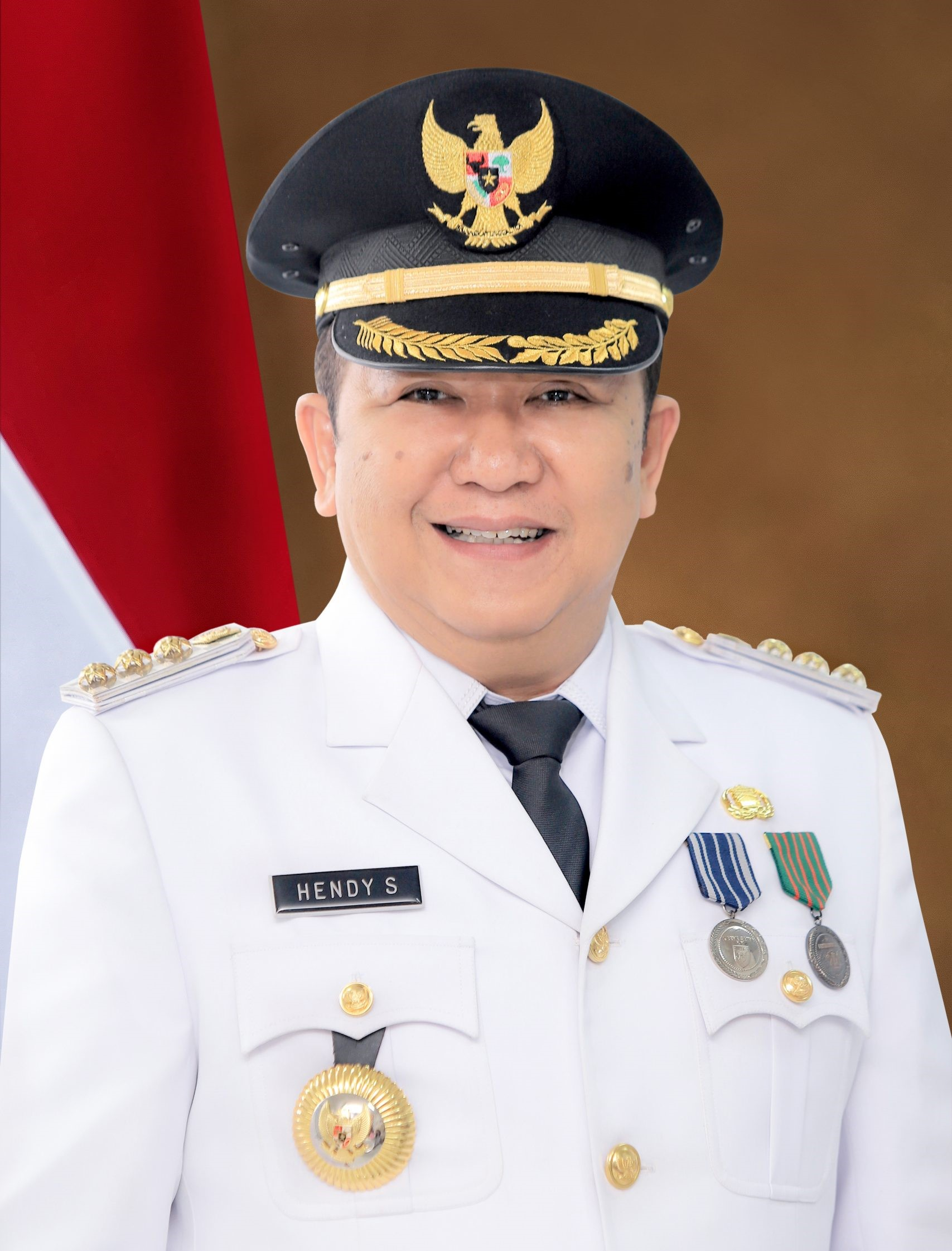
- Official portrait

Regent of Jember
- In office 26 February 2021 – 20 February 2025
- Preceded by: Faida
- Succeeded by: Muhammad Fawait

Personal details
- Born: 6 May 1962 (age 64) Jember, East Java, Indonesia

Hendy Siswanto (born 6 May 1962) is an Indonesian civil servant and politician who served as the regent of Jember Regency, East Java from 2021 until 2025. Before becoming regent, he had worked as a civil servant in the railways unit of the transport ministry for over 20 years.

== Early life ==
Hendy was born on 6 May 1962 in Ledok village, in Kaliwates district of Jember Regency. He was the third of five children. He received his education within Jember, graduating from a private university there.

== Career ==
After graduating, Hendy initially worked at a private construction company, before moving to Jakarta in 1993 to work as a civil servant at the Ministry of Transportation's railways directorate-general. He worked there until 2016, being involved in the development and operations of railways in South Sumatra and Central Java. He was head of development of Central Java's railway network when he retired. After retiring from civil service, he became a private businessman, developing a hotel, a drinking water company, and fashion stores in Jember.

=== As regent ===
In the 2020 local elections, Hendy ran for the regency of Jember, with Balya Firjaun Barlaman (former member of the provincial legislature and son of a Nahdlatul Ulama figure) as running mate. The ticket was supported by political parties Gerindra, Nasdem, Demokrat, PKS, PPP, and Berkarya. The pair won 489,794 votes (46.6%) in the three-way race, defeating incumbent regent Faida. The two were sworn in on 26 February 2021.

During his term as regent, Hendy earmarked funding from municipal budget to develop organic fertilizer production in Jember. Municipal taxes also became payable online during his tenure.

He ran for reelection in 2024, after joining the Indonesian Democratic Party of Struggle (PDIP). His reelection bid is supported by PDIP and the Ummat Party. He was defeated by Muhammad Fawait.
