= Tausiyah =

Part of proselytizing of Islam in Indonesia

Tausiyah or tausiah is a term used among the Muslim community in Indonesia, referring to the broadcast of dawah (proselytizing) which is conducted informally. Tausiyah is distinguished from regular khutbah (sermon) which has more serious tone, or Tabligh Akbar which can be attended by thousands of participants.

In practice, tausiyah also refers to the promotion of patience in life, stemming from the Islamic teaching in the Qur'an Surah Al-Asr verse 3:

Except those who have faith and do righteous deeds, and enjoin one another to [follow] the truth, and enjoin one another to patience.

— Quran 103:3
