= Javanese orthography =

Latin alphabet used for writing Javanese language

Javanese Latin alphabet is Latin script used for writing the Javanese language. Prior to the introduction of Latin script, Javanese was written in Javanese script (hanacaraka).

The Latin script was introduced during Dutch colonial period which exhibited the influence of Dutch orthography. Since the introduction of Latin script, the Javanese orthography in Latin script has undergone several orthographic reforms.

The alphabet is generally the same as the Indonesian alphabet. There are six digraphs: dh, kh, ng, ny, sy, and th, and two letters with diacritics: é and è.

== Alphabet ==
Letter	Name	Letter	Name	Letter	Name
A a	a	J j	jé	S s	ès
B b	bé	K k	ka	T t	té
C c	cé	L l	èl	U u	u
D d	dé	M m	èm	V v	fé
E e	é	N n	èn	W w	wé
F f	èf	O o	o	X x	èks
G g	gé	P p	pé	Y y	yé
H h	ha	Q q	ki	Z z	zèt
I i	i	R r	èr		

== Sound and Spelling Correlation ==
Usage
Sriwedari (1927)	Indonesian (2011)	Suriname (1986)	Sound (IPA)	Notes
a	a	â	/a/	
a	a	a	/ɔ/	In open final syllables, or open penultimates followed by another open <Aa>. Depends on dialect. Sometimes written as <Oo>. Sometimes <Åå> is used to distinguish it from /a/.
b	b	b	/b̥/	
tj	c	ty	/tʃ/	
d	d	d	/d̪̥/	
ḍ	dh	d	/ɖ̥/	
e	e	e	/ə/	Sometimes <Ěě> is used.
e	é	e	/e/	In open syllables.
e	è	e	/ɛ/	In closed syllable, or when followed by an open /i u/.
f	f	f	/f/	Only used in loanwords
g	g	g	/ɡ̊/	
h	h	h	/h/	
i	i	i	/i/	In open syllables.
i	i	i	/ɪ/	In closed syllable.
dj	j	j	/dʒ̊/	
k	k	k	/k/	
l	l	l	/l/	
m	m	m	/m/	
n	n	n	/n/	
ng	ng	ng	/ŋ/	
nj	ny	ny	/ɲ/	
o	o	o	/o/	In open syllables.
o	o	o	/ɔ/	In closed syllable, or when followed by an open /i u/. Sometimes <Óó> is used to distinguish it from /o/
p	p	p	/p/	
q	q	q	/q/	Only used in loanwords.
r	r	r	/r/	
s	s	s	/s/	
t	t	t	/t̪/	
ṭ	th	t	/ʈ/	
oe	u	u	/u/	In open syllables.
oe	u	u	/ʊ/	In closed syllables. Sometimes <Úú> is used to distinguish it from /u/
v	v	v	/v/	Only used in loanwords.
w	w	w	/w/	
x	x	x	/x/	Only used in loanwords.
j	y	y	/j/	
z	z	z	/z/	Only used in loanwords.

== Relation with Javanese script ==
- (h)a - ꦲ or ꦄ (A)
- b(a) - ꦧ
- c(a) - ꦕ
- d(a) - ꦢ
- dh(a) - ꦝ
- é and è - ꦲꦺ or ꦌ (É/È)
- (h)e - ꦲꦼ
- f(a) - foreign letter ꦥ꦳
- g(a) - ꦒ
- h(a) - ꦲ
- (h)i - ꦲꦶ or ꦆ (I)
- j(a) - ꦗ
- k(a) - ꦏ
- l(a) - ꦭ
- m(a) - ꦩ
- n(a) - ꦤ
- ny(a) - ꦚ
- ng(a) - ꦔ
- (h)o - ꦲꦺꦴ or ꦎ (O)
- p(a) - ꦥ
- q(a) - Sasak letter ꦐ
- r(a) - ꦫ
- s(a) - ꦱ
- t(a) - ꦠ
- th(a) - ꦛ
- (h)u - ꦲꦸ or ꦈ (U)
- v(a) - foreign letter ꦮ꦳
- w(a) - ꦮ
- x(a) - Approximated by ꦏ꧀ꦱ
- y(a) - ꦪ
- z(a) - foreign letter ꦗ꦳

== See also ==
- Javanese script
- Pegon script
- Malay orthography
