= Jember Regency =

Regency in East Java, Indonesia

Jember Regency Kabupaten Jember
- Regency

other transcription(s)
  - Javanese: Jêmbêr (Gêdrig) جۤمبۤر (Pégon) ꦗꦼꦩ꧀ꦧꦼꦂ (Hånåcåråkå)
  - Madurese: Jhembher (Latèn) جۤمبۤر (Pèghu) ꦗꦼꦩ꧀ꦧꦼꦂ (Carakan)
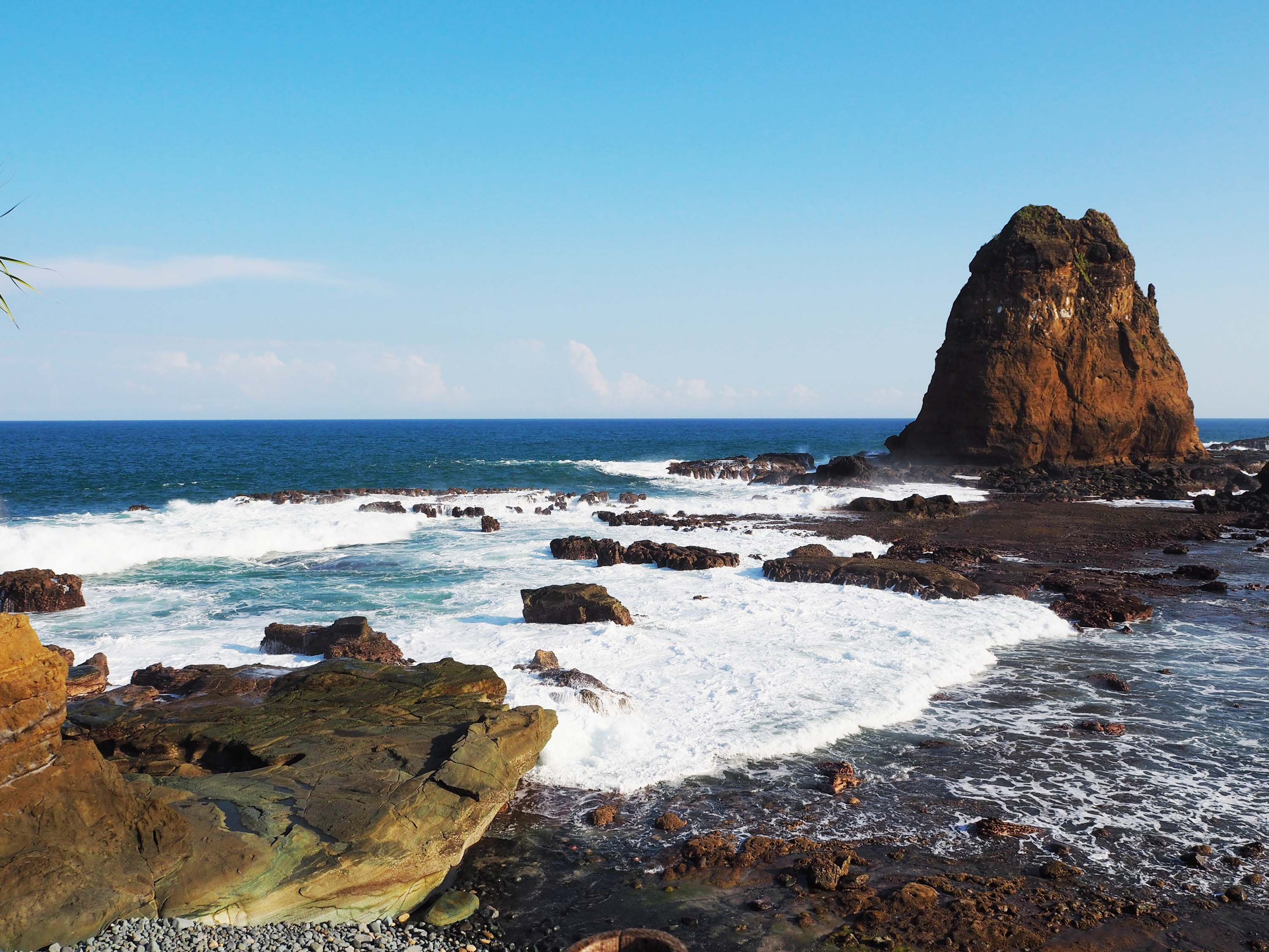
- Papuma Beach

- Coat of arms
- Motto(s): Carya Dharma Praja Mukti (Works and devotion for the sake of the country)
- Location within Indonesia
- Coordinates: 8°10′8″S 113°42′8″E
- Country: Indonesia
- Province: East Java

Government
  - Regent: Muhammad Fawait
  - Vice Regent: Djoko Susanto

Area
  - Total: 3,314.13 km^{2} (1,279.59 sq mi)

Population (mid 2025 estimate)
  - Total: 2,625,429
  - Density: 792.193/km^{2} (2,051.77/sq mi)
- Time zone: UTC+7 (WIB)
- Postal code: 62100
- Area codes: +62-331, +62-336
- Website: jemberkab.go.id

Jember Regency is a regency of East Java province, in Indonesia. The land area is 3,314.13 km^{2}, and the population was 2,332,726 at the 2010 census and 2,536,729 at the 2020 Census; the official estimate as of mid 2025 was 2,625,429 (comprising 1,311,702 males and 1,313,727 females). Its administrative capital is the urban area of Jember, which with 370,687 inhabitants in mid 2025 is the fourth largest urban area in East Java province (after Surabaya, Malang and Kediri), but does not have municipality or city status as it is split between three separate administrative districts (kecamatan). Jember is famous for its tobacco farms and traditional food called tape which is made of fermented cassava.

== Geography ==
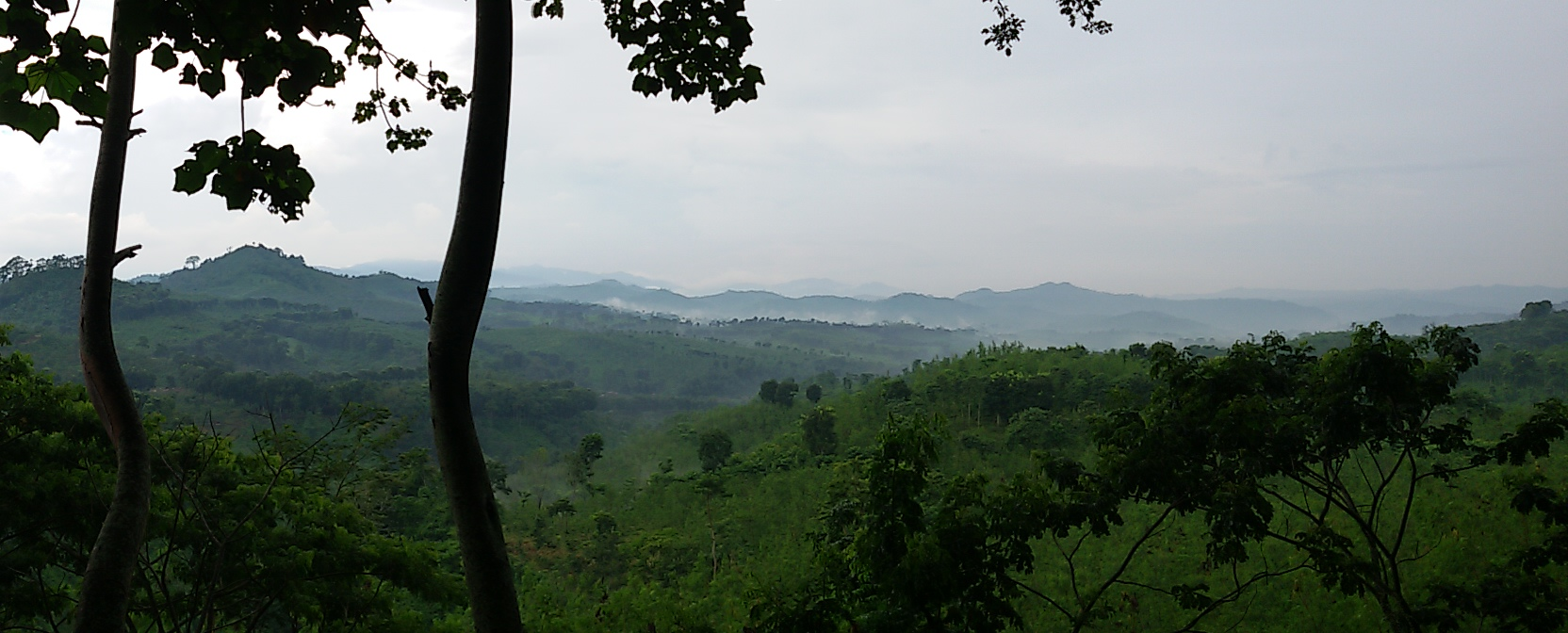
Gumitir Mountain range

Jember Regency has a total area of 3,314.13.69 km^{2}. It shares its borders with the regencies of Lumajang (to the west), Probolinggo, Bondowoso and Situbondo (to the north), and Banyuwangi (to the east). To the south lies the Indian Ocean, where the regency includes the island of Nusa Barong, located to the south of Java.

== Administrative districts ==
Jember Regency consists of thirty-one districts (Indonesian: kecamatan), listed below with their areas and their populations at the 2010 Census and the 2020 Census, together with the official estimates as of mid 2025. All districts have the same name as the towns or villages which provide their administrative centres. The table also includes the locations of the district administrative centres, the number of villages in each district (totaling 226 rural desa and 22 urban kelurahan - the latter comprising the 3 districts forming the Jember urban area), and its post code(s).

Code (s) (Kode Wilayah)	Name of District (kecamatan)	Area in km^{2}	Pop'n Census 2010	Pop'n Census 2020	Pop'n Estimate mid 2025	Admin centre	No. of villages	Post code(s)
35.09.02	Kencong	65.40	65,173	71,430	71,084	Kencong	5	68167
35.09.04	Gumuk Mas	90.53	79,224	87,724	90,757	Gumukmas	8	68165
35.09.08	Puger ^{(a)}	158.97	114,506	123,763	127,143	Puger Kulon	12	68164
35.09.11	Wuluhan ^{(b)}	139.26	114,695	123,999	130,003	Dukuhdempok	7	68162
35.09.12	Ambulu ^{(c)}	101.41	105,103	116,361	121,843	Ambulu	7	68172 ^{(d)}
35.09.18	Tempurejo ^{(e)}	515.99	70,663	78,926	82,494	Tempurejo	8	68173
35.09.30	Silo	344.42	103,850	108,150	112,779	Sempolan	9	68184
35.09.26	Mayang	57.78	48,362	50,971	53,033	Tegalrejo	7	68182 ^{(f)}
35.09.23	Mumbulsari	90.00	62,339	68,009	70,702	Mumbulsari	7	68174
35.09.16	Jenggawah	61.24	81,318	87,682	92,072	Wonosari	8	68171
35.09.17	Ajung	58.84	74,416	82,046	86,523	Klompangan	7	68175
35.09.13	Rambipuji	55.00	78,934	86,834	89,024	Rambipuji	8	68152
35.09.10	Balung	49.39	77,005	81,680	84,956	Balung Lor	8	68161
35.09.05	Umbulsari	71.46	69,539	78,245	79,440	Umbulsari	10	68166
35.09.07	Semboro	45.20	43,475	49,070	49,971	Semboro	6	68157
35.09.01	Jombang	53.89	50,003	55,553	56,192	Jombang	6	68168
35.09.03	Sumberbaru	161.04	99,416	115,270	117,629	Yosorati	10	68156
35.09.06	Tanggul	202.62	82,760	93,057	94,499	Tanggul Kulon	8	68155
35.09.09	Bangsalsari	161.75	113,905	124,264	129,153	Bangsalsari	11	68154
35.09.14	Panti	181.00	59,399	65,084	67,987	Glagahwero	7	68153
35.09.15	Sukorambi	46.92	37,950	41,161	43,013	Sukorambi	5	68151
35.09.22	Arjasa	35.88	38,055	41,295	43,573	Arjasa	6	68191
35.09.24	Pakusari	31.26	41,713	45,059	47,141	Sumberpinang	7	68181
35.09.27	Kalisat	52.67	74,962	78,428	81,027	Glagahwero	12	68193 ^{(g)}
35.09.28	Ledokombo	133.84	62,528	68,193	70,868	Sumberlesung	10	68196
35.09.31	Sumberjambe	132.93	60,126	62,635	65,231	Sumberjambe	9	68195
35.09.29	Sukowono	45.13	58,734	60,317	62,686	Sukowono	12	68194
35.09.25	Jelbuk	73.38	31,962	32,339	33,919	Jelbuk	6	68192
35.09.19	Kaliwates ^{(h)}	24.74	111,861	125,855	127,951	Manggli	7	68131 - 68137
35.09.21	Sumbersari ^{(h)}	35.98	126,279	132,802	138,467	Karangrejo	7	68121 - 68126
35.09.20	Patrang ^{(h)}	36.71	94,471	100,527	104,269	Patrang	8	68111 - 68118
	Totals	3,314.13	2,332,726	2,536,729	2,625,429		248	

Notes: (a) includes the substantial offshore island of Nusa Barong (Pulau Nusa Barong, which forms the administrative village - or desa - of Puger Wetan) as well as 13 much smaller offshore islands.
(b) includes 2 small offshore islands. (c) includes 12 small offshore islands. (d) except Karanganyar village, which has the post code of 68132. (e) includes 22 small offshore islands.
(f) except Tegalrejo village, which has the post code of 68118. (g) except Plalangan village, which has the post code of 68113.
(h) the last three districts (indicated by "(h)" above) together constitute the urban area of Jember town.

== Jember urban area ==
The Regent's Office

The "town" of Jember is composed of 3 separate districts (kecamatan) but has no overall administration below the Regency level. It is subdivided into 22 kelurahan as follows:

- Kaliwates District comprises the kelurahan of Jember Kidul, Kaliwates, Kebon Agung, Kepatihan, Mangli, Sempusari and Tegal Besar.
- Sumbersari District comprises the kelurahan of Antirogo, Karangrejo, Kebonsari, Kranjingan, Sumbersari, Tegalgede and Wirolegi.
- Patrang District comprises the kelurahan of Banjarsengon, Baratan, Bintoro, Gebang, Jember Lor, Jumerto, Patrang and Slawu.

Kode Wilayah	Name of Village (kelurahan)	Area in km^{2}	Pop'n Estimate mid 2024	Post code
35.09.19.1001	Mangli	3.97	16,731	68136
35.09.04.1002	Sempusari	6.25	13,240	68135
35.09.19.1004	Kaliwates (village)	4.07	14,327	68133
35.09.19.1007	Tegal Besar	8.45	41,582	68132
35.09.19.1005	Jember Kidul	2.99	18,815	68131
35.09.19.1006	Kepatihan	3.07	15,851	68137
35.09.19.1003	Kebon Agung	4.37	7,155	68137
35.09.21.1003	Kranjingan	8.23	17,861	68126
35.09.21.1005	Tegalgede	5.05	9,733	68124
35.09.21.1001	Kebonsari	4.52	31,613	68122
35.09.21.1004	Karangrejo	7.93	20,734	68124
35.09.21.1002	Sumbersari (village)	5.62	30,993	68121
35.09.21.1007	Antirogo	7.28	12,264	68125
35.09.21.1006	Wirolegi	8.75	14,594	68124
35.09.20.1003	Gebang	6.09	27,110	68117
35.09.20.1006	Jember Lor	3.92	18,127	68118
35.09.20,1007	Patrang (village)	4.59	19,268	68111
35.09.20.1008	Baratan	8.41	12,121	68112
35.09.20.1005	Bintoro	15.54	11,826	68113
35.09.20.1004	Slawu	4.13	7,947	68116
35.09.20.1002	Jumerto	6.49	3,196	68114
35.09.20.1001	Banjarsengon	5.12	4,327	68118
	Totals	134.84	370,687 (2025)	

== Climate ==
Climate data for Jember
Month	Jan	Feb	Mar	Apr	May	Jun	Jul	Aug	Sep	Oct	Nov	Dec	Year
Mean daily maximum °C (°F)	30.1 (86.2)	30.4 (86.7)	30.6 (87.1)	31.0 (87.8)	30.7 (87.3)	30.2 (86.4)	30.0 (86.0)	30.3 (86.5)	31.0 (87.8)	31.5 (88.7)	31.4 (88.5)	30.6 (87.1)	30.6 (87.2)
Daily mean °C (°F)	25.2 (77.4)	25.2 (77.4)	25.2 (77.4)	25.3 (77.5)	25.3 (77.5)	24.5 (76.1)	24.3 (75.7)	24.5 (76.1)	25.1 (77.2)	25.8 (78.4)	25.9 (78.6)	25.5 (77.9)	25.2 (77.3)
Mean daily minimum °C (°F)	21.5 (70.7)	21.3 (70.3)	21.5 (70.7)	21.3 (70.3)	21.0 (69.8)	20.1 (68.2)	19.7 (67.5)	19.5 (67.1)	20.0 (68.0)	20.9 (69.6)	21.5 (70.7)	21.6 (70.9)	20.8 (69.5)
Average precipitation mm (inches)	432.6 (17.03)	361.0 (14.21)	388.4 (15.29)	240.4 (9.46)	173.4 (6.83)	88.0 (3.46)	72.4 (2.85)	43.5 (1.71)	88.6 (3.49)	197.8 (7.79)	318.9 (12.56)	421.8 (16.61)	2,826.8 (111.29)
Average precipitation days	18.8	18.2	16.5	11.0	7.7	6.2	3.5	2.1	2.0	2.8	5.8	15.0	109.6
Source: weatherbase

== Demographics ==
The Al-Baitul Amien Mosque, a common congregation point for Jember's Muslim population

There were 2,332,726 people living in Jember Regency at the 2010 Census. The population has risen by 2020 to 2,536,729; the official estimate as at mid 2025 was 2,625,420, giving an average density of about 792.2 people/km^{2}. The majority of Jember's residents are Muslim. The Al-Baitul Amien Mosque near the alun-alun in Patrang district is a common religious tourism destination.

=== Ethnic backgrounds ===
Jember Regency is a heterogeneous area where many ethnic groups are mingled and live together. Most of its population are Javanese and Madurese people, with a small percentage of ethnic Chinese, Balinese, Arab and Indian.

=== Language ===
Most citizens speak the Javanese language or the Madurese language, and sometimes a mixed dialect of both Javanese and Madurese languages. Many citizens speak Indonesian for official and business purposes only, and to communicate with non-Javanese or non-Madurese people.

== Jember Fashion Carnival ==
The Jember Fashion Carnaval is an annual event. In the tenth carnival in 2011, over 600 participants walked along the world's longest catwalk. It ran for 3.6 kilometres (2.2 mi), along Jalan P.B. Sudirman (Central Park) and Jalan Gajah Mada up to the Jember Sport Hall.

== Airport ==
An expansion of dormant Notohadinegoro Airport was verified for reuse/operational in June 2014. The airport now has 1,705 meters runway and was ready to serve up to ATR 72/600.

However, the airport has been closed since April 2020 with no plans to reopen. High jet fuel prices and a lack of demand make Notohadinegoro Airport unprofitable for domestic airlines.

== Notable people ==
- Tiara Andini (born 2001), singer and actress
- Bayu Gatra (born 1991), professional footballer
- Andik Vermansah (born 1991), professional footballer
- Badrodin Haiti (born 1958), Indonesian National Police Chief in 2015–2016
- Dewi Perssik (born 1988), singer
- Anang Hermansyah (born 1969), singer and politician.
- Megawati Hangestri Pertiwi (born 1999), professional indoor volleyball player.

== See also ==
- Culture of Jember
- Mayang River
- SMK PGRI 05 Jember
