= Tenggerese =

Tenggerese may refer to:

- Tenggerese dialect, a dialect of the Javanese language spoken in Java, Indonesia
- Tenggerese people, a sub-ethnicity of the Javanese people from Indonesia

== See also ==
- Tengger (disambiguation)
