= Tengger =

Tengger may refer to:

- Kingdom of Tengger, a 15th-century Majapahit successor state, which gave its name to:
  - Tengger mountain range, East Java
  - Tenggerese people of Java, Indonesia
  - Tengger massif, a geographic feature in East Java
  - Bromo Tengger Semeru National Park located on the massif
  - Tengger Caldera located in the park, which includes Mount Bromo
- Tengri (Mongolian: Тэнгэр, Tenger; Chinese: 腾格里, Mandarin:Ténggélǐ), a Turkic and Mongolian sky god, who gave his name to:
  - Otgontenger, a mountain in Mongolia
  - Tengger Desert, a desert in China
  - Tengger (singer), a pop singer from Inner Mongolia
  - Tengger Cavalry, a Mongolian folk-metal band
  - Tengger (band), a Japanese-Korean band

== See also ==
- Tenggerese (disambiguation)
