= Hinduism in Java =

Javanese Hinduism
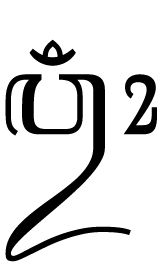
- Javanese Hindu "Om" symbol

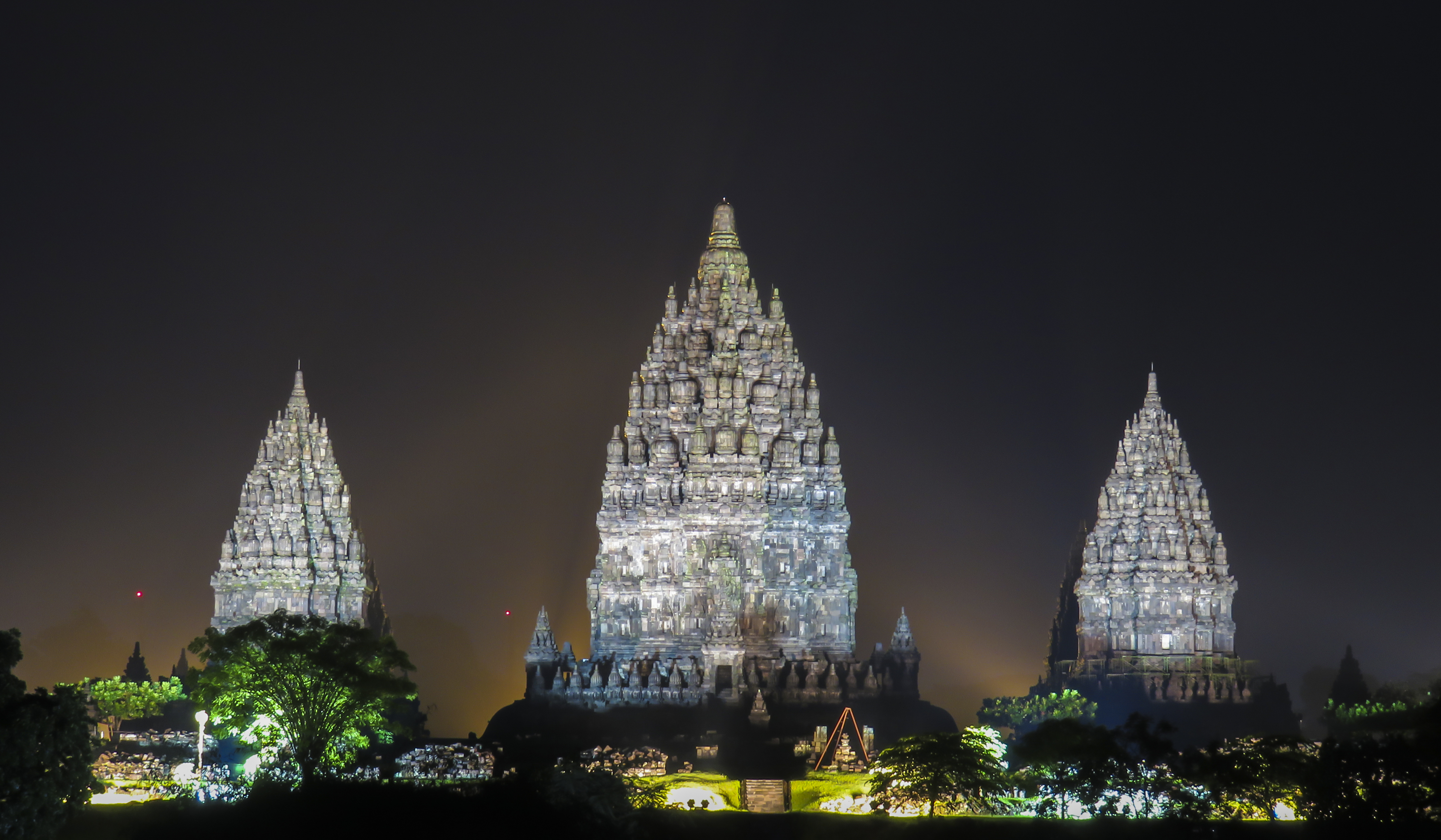
- The 8th century Hindu temples of Prambanan, near Yogyakarta, Java

Regions with significant populations
- Java; East Java (especially in around Mount Bromo, Hindu is formed a majority in Tosari District of Pasuruan Regency (66.3%) with Predominantly of Tenggerese people) · Special Region of Yogyakarta · Central Java · West Java

Religions
- Hinduism

Languages
- Sanskrit, Old Javanese, Javanese, Sundanese

Related ethnic groups
- Balinese Hindus and other Indonesian Hindus

Hinduism (Indonesian: Hinduisme di Jawa; Javanese: ꦲꦶꦤ꧀ꦢꦸꦮꦶꦱ꧀ꦩꦺ ꦲꦶꦤ꧀ꦒ꧀ ꦗꦮ, romanized: Hinduismè ing Jawi; Sundanese: ᮃᮌᮨᮙᮔ᮪ ᮠᮤᮔ᮪ᮓᮥ ᮓᮤ ᮏᮝ, romanized: Ageman Hindu di Jawa) has historically been a major religious and cultural influence in Java, Indonesia. Hinduism was the dominant religion in the region before the arrival of Islam. In recent years, it has also been enjoying something of a resurgence, particularly in the eastern part of the island.

== History ==
Both Java and Sumatra were subject to considerable cultural influence from India during the first and second millennia of the A.D.. Both Hinduism and Buddhism, which are both Indian religions and share a common historical background and whose membership may even overlap at times, were widely propagated in the Maritime Southeast Asia.

Hinduism and the Sanskrit language through which it was transmitted, became highly prestigious and the dominant religion in Java. Many Hindu temples were built, including Prambanan near Yogyakarta, which has been designated a World Heritage Site; and Hindu kingdoms flourished, of which the most important was Majapahit.

In the sixth and seventh centuries many maritime kingdoms arose in Sumatra and Java which controlled the waters in the Straits of Malacca and flourished with the increasing sea trade between China and India and beyond. During this time, scholars from India and China visited these kingdoms to translate literary and religious texts.

Majapahit was based in East Java and Sunda was based in West Java, from where it ruled a large part of what is now western Indonesia. The remnants of the both kingdom shifted to Bali during the c. 16th century as Muslim kingdoms in the western part of the island gained influence. Mentions of Hinduism in Java end around the early 16th century.

Although Java was gradually converted to Islam during the 15th century and afterwards, substantial elements of Hindu (and pre-Hindu) customs and beliefs persist among ordinary Javanese. Particularly in central and eastern Java, Abangan or 'nominal' Muslims are predominant. Javanists, who uphold this folk tradition, coexist along with more orthodox Islamicizing elements.

Javanese Om symbol

Sundanese Om symbol

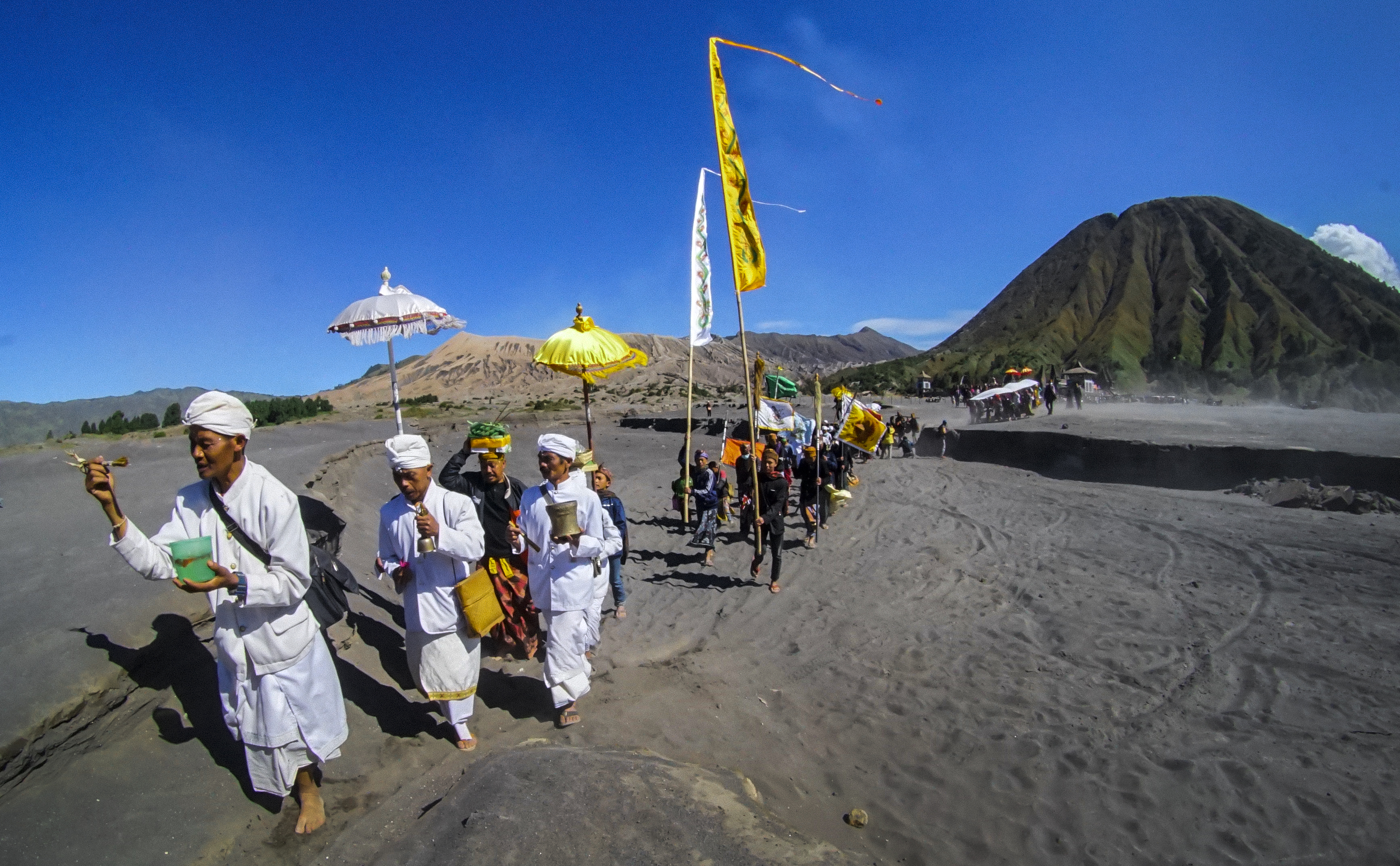
Tenggerese people performing a Melasti ceremony ritual (Balinese influence), the only sub-Javanese ethnic group that today is still predominantly Hindu on the island.

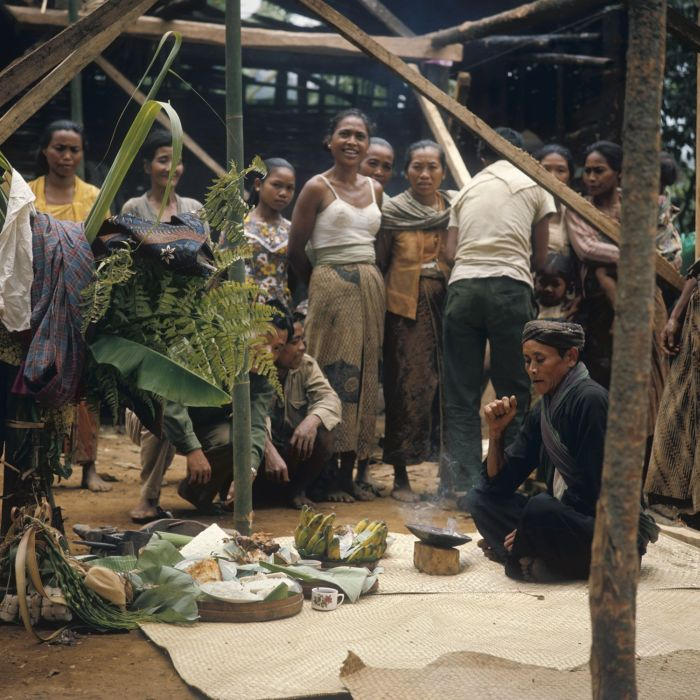
Tenggerese offering, 1971

== Survivals ==
Hinduism or Hindu-animist fusion have been preserved by a number of Javanese communities, many of which claim descent from Majapahit warriors and princes. The Osings in the Banyuwangi Regency of East Java are a community whose religion shows many similarities to that of Bali. The Tenggerese communities at the foot of Mount Bromo are officially Hindu, but their religion includes many elements of Buddhism including the worship of Buddha along with Hindu trinity Shiva, Vishnu, and Brahma. The Badui or some parts of Sundanese in have a religion of their own which incorporates Hindu traits. Some Javanese communities still practice Kejawèn, consisting of an amalgam of animistic, Buddhist, and Hindu aspects. Yogyakarta is stronghold of Kejawen.

The Tenggerese today celebrate Yadnya Kasada, an annual festival where offerings such as rice, fruits, vegetables, flowers, and money are thrown into the crater of the active volcano Mount Bromo. The significance is attached to the local legend of a royal couple and the sacrifice Prince Kesuma.

== Modern day ==
Conversions to Hinduism varies, an example being in two close and culturally similar regions, the Yogyakarta region, where only sporadic conversions to Hinduism had taken place, and the Klaten region, which has witnessed the highest percentage of Hindu converts in Java. It has been argued that this dissimilarity was related to the difference in the perception of Islam among the Javanese population in each region. Since the mass killings of 1965–1966 in Klaten had been far worse than those in Yogyakarta, in Klaten the political landscape had been more politicized than in Yogyakarta. Because the killers in Klaten were to a large extent identified with Islam, the people in this region did not convert to Islam, but preferred Hinduism (and Christianity).

Also there is fear for those who are adherent of Javanism of the purge, in order to hide their practices they converted into Hinduism, though they may not entirely practice the religion. Many of the new "Hindus" in Gunung Lawu and Kediri are an example of this.

== See also ==
- Abangan
- Balinese Hinduism
- Buddhism in Indonesia
- Candi of Indonesia
- Dewi Sri
- Hinduism in Indonesia
- Hinduism in Southeast Asia
- Hyang
- Indonesian Esoteric Buddhism
- Javanese Kshatriya
- Kakawin Sutasoma
- Kejawèn
- Prajnaparamita of Java
- Sanghyang Siksa Kandang Karesian
- Sunda Wiwitan
