= Bangil =

Capital of Pasuruan Regency, Indonesia

Bangil Kecamatan Bangil
- Town
- Motto: Bangil Bangkit (Rise Up Bangil)
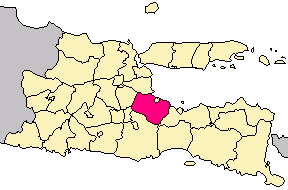
- Location of Bangil in Pasuruan

- Bangil location in Java
- Coordinates: 7.597827°S 112.784568°E
- Country: Indonesia
- Province: East Java
- Regency: Pasuruan
- District: Bangil
- Established: 18 September 929 (1094 years)
- Administrative Centre: Alun-Alun Bangil

Government
  - Head of District: Fathurrahman

Area
  - Total: 44.60 km^{2} (17.22 sq mi)
- Elevation: 9 m (30 ft)

Population (mid 2024 estimate)
  - Total: 85,504
  - Density: 1,917/km^{2} (4,965/sq mi)
- Time zone: WIB (UTC+7)
- Postal code: 67153
- Area code: 0343
- Website: www.bangil.pasuruankab.go.id

Bangil (Javanese: Bangel, Arabic: بانغيل) is the name of a district and administrative centre of Pasuruan Regency, in the East Java province of Indonesia. Located 30 km from Surabaya, it lies on the southwest coast of the Madura Strait. The district is divided into fifteen villages.

On September 11, 2005, the Regency of Pasuruan declared the name Bangkodir (Bangil Kota Bordir) – 'Bangil, the embroidery city' – when the district won the MURI record for the longest embroidered fabric. The embroidered fabric was displayed during the Fashion Show (Fashion on the Street) with its length as long as 1 km.

The town of Bangil, lies between the access road from Surabaya to Banyuwangi and Bali, having alternative short routes connecting it to Pandaan, Sukorejo, and Malang. In 2010 the Pasuruan Regency decided to make the town of Bangil the administrative capital of the Regency.

== Villages ==
The district is composed of the following administrative villages

- Kolursari
- Kidul Dalem
- Pogar
- Kauman
- Bendo Mungal
- Kersikan
- Gempeng
- Dermo
- Latek
- Masangan
- Raci
- Kalianyar
- Manaruwi
- Kalirejo
- Tambakan

== History ==
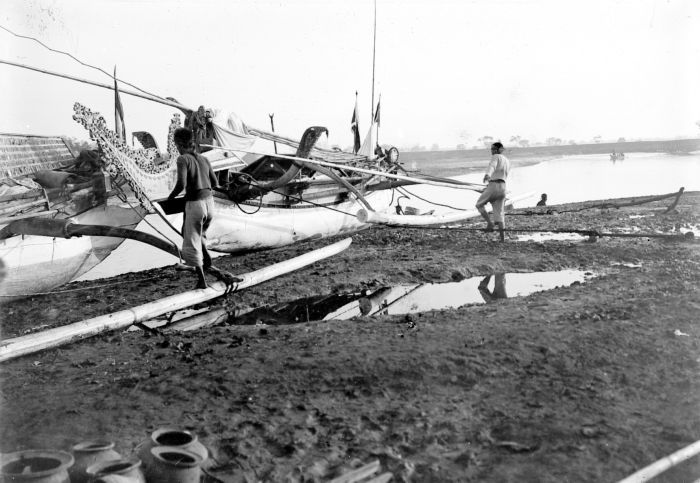
Port of Bangil with Madurese pirogues, East Java

There is no reliable reference to explain how the name Bangil originated. The Santri group of students said that Bangil derived from Mbah Ngilmu, referring to a cleric who was known to be courageous in the defense of Islam. The more popular story in the wider community says that the name comes from the Javanese word Mbah'e Angel, where the word angel Means very difficult, referring to the character of the Bangil people that is difficult to change. The name of Bangil is also listed in an ancient Chinese document stating that when King Ta'Cheh (either Muawiyah bin Abu Sufyan or his son Yazid I) sent a spy to monitor the Kalinga Kingdom, the messenger landed at a small harbor named Banger, or Bang-il as the Chinese call it.

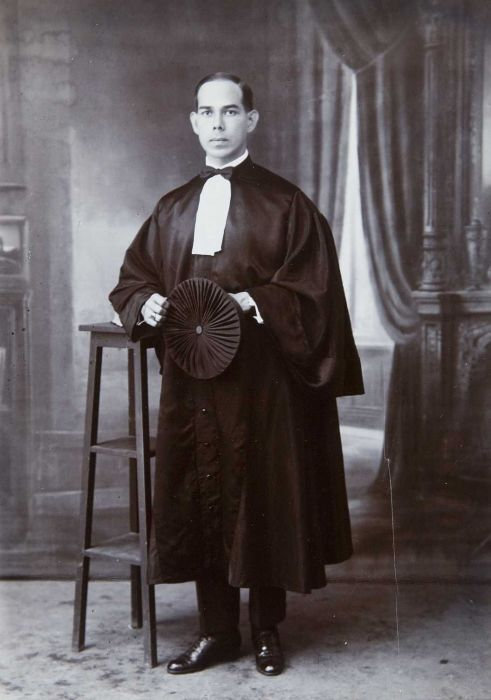
Studio portrait of Henri Edmund Boissevain, the president of the Bangil Land Council in judicial gown, August 18, 1924 (photo by Tjioe Siauw Tjhwan)

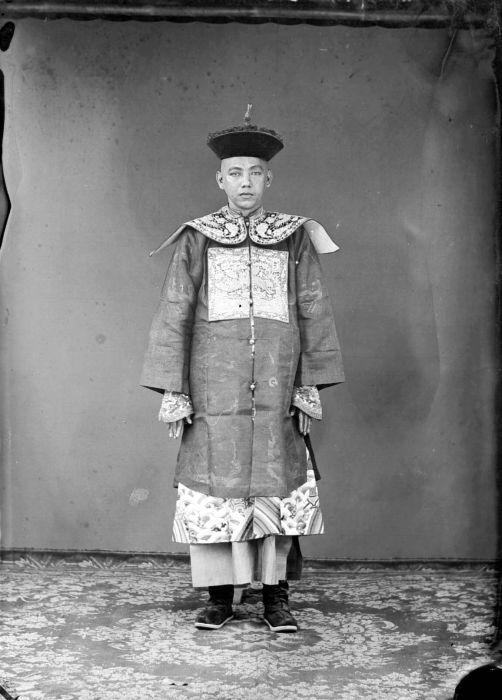
A portrait of a Kapitan Cina in Bangil

The town was also the place where Untung Surapati's last war against the Dutch's VOC in 1706 took place and also where he died. Suropati's force tried to defend the fortification wall surrounding Bangil with its artillery, but eventually the Dutch, led by Govert Knol, defeated him and took over the town, where they lost about 400 to 500 soldiers of the Madurese.

Arab merchants arrived around 1860 in the old town for trading, along with the Chinese merchants through a port in Porong Creek, located between Bangil and Rembang. Although Bangil was a relatively small area used as a stopover village, it was already known by traders familiar with its economic potentials, before they spread to the surrounding areas. Since 1873, Hadharim settlements were created in Bangil under the leadership of several Kapitan Arab such as Saleh bin Muhammad bin Said Sabaja (1892), Muhammad bin Saleh Sabaja (1920), and Muhammad bin Salim Nabhan (1930).

Although not often noted in the historical literature, records show that Bangil was once reached by a Hindu kingdom, Medang Kamulan. However, Bangil is more known as a region that has a very strong Islamic culture, including the presence of Islamic educational institutions spread throughout the town. The spread of Islam in this town was not only carried out by Hadhrami people but also by Chinese people such as Bong Swi Ho when he was a Captain of the Chinese.

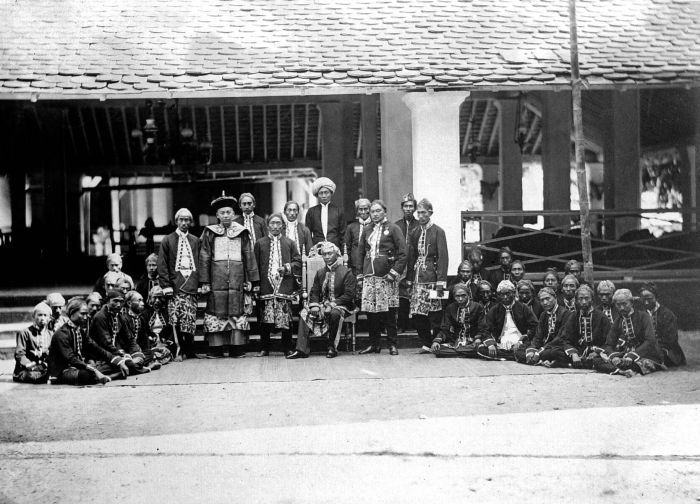
Bangil indigenous civil servants with Arab and Chinese leaders during the Dutch East Indies Rule

This town is also known to have a female Islamic hero named Syarifah Khadija, also known as Mbah Ratu Ayu, a grandchild of Sunan Gunung Jati. It was told there was a Muslim missionary who originally settled in Cirebon named Abdurrahman ibn Umar Basyaiban who married her and had two sons, one named Arif Basyaiban who studied in Segoro Puro. Another son named Sulaiman, otherwise known as Mojoagung Sulaiman, is believed to have been the founder of Pesantren Sidogiri (Sidogiri boarding school), the oldest boarding school in East Java. It is said that after visiting his two sons, Mbah Ratu fell ill and eventually died in Bangil, where her grave can be found in the area between Swadesi and Kersikan.

Bangil is also the place where Sutomo was sent for his primary education at a Dutch-language elementary school. While in Bangil, he stayed with his maternal uncle.

== Climate ==
Bangil has a Tropical wet and dry climate, with distinct wet and dry seasons. This climate is considered to be Aw according to the Köppen-Geiger climate classification. The average annual high temperature in Bangil is around 32.36 °C (90.25 °F) and the average annual low temperature is 23.61 °C (74.50 °F). The town's wet season runs from October through May, while the dry season covers the remaining four months. Unlike several cities, towns and regions with a tropical wet and dry climate, the average high and low temperatures are very consistent throughout the year.

Climate data for Bangil, Pasuruan Regency (elevation 9 m or 30 ft)
Month	Jan	Feb	Mar	Apr	May	Jun	Jul	Aug	Sep	Oct	Nov	Dec	Year
Mean daily maximum °C (°F)	31.5 (88.7)	31.5 (88.7)	31.6 (88.9)	31.7 (89.1)	31.9 (89.4)	31.9 (89.4)	31.8 (89.2)	32.3 (90.1)	32.7 (90.9)	33.1 (91.6)	32.8 (91.0)	32 (90)	32.1 (89.8)
Daily mean °C (°F)	26.9 (80.4)	27 (81)	27 (81)	27 (81)	26.8 (80.2)	26.2 (79.2)	25.7 (78.3)	26.1 (79.0)	26.5 (79.7)	27.2 (81.0)	27.4 (81.3)	27 (81)	26.7 (80.3)
Mean daily minimum °C (°F)	22.4 (72.3)	22.5 (72.5)	22.4 (72.3)	22.3 (72.1)	21.7 (71.1)	20.6 (69.1)	19.7 (67.5)	19.9 (67.8)	20.4 (68.7)	21.4 (70.5)	22.1 (71.8)	22.1 (71.8)	21.5 (70.6)
Average precipitation mm (inches)	261 (10.3)	280 (11.0)	220 (8.7)	152 (6.0)	103 (4.1)	67 (2.6)	32 (1.3)	7 (0.3)	7 (0.3)	21 (0.8)	90 (3.5)	211 (8.3)	1,451 (57.2)
Average relative humidity (%)	82.2	83.5	83.3	78.6	79	76.4	73.6	71.1	68.7	69.1	72.2	78.8	76.4
Source 1: Climate-Data.org (temp & precip)
Source 2: Weatherbase (humidity)

== Demographics ==
The town of Bangil is populated with various tribes and ethnicities, including Javanese, Indonesian Chinese, Arab Indonesian, Banjar, Madurese, and others.

The population makeup of Bangil District as of 2010 is 98.05% Muslims, 0.61% Protestants, 0.48% Catholics, 0.72% Hindus, and 0.14% Buddhist.

== Education ==
Bangil is known as the "Town of Santri" because there are well-known Islamic boarding schools built and established here, for example, YAPIboarding school built by Husein al-Habsyi. The word YAPI is a contraction of the Indonesian words Yayasan Pesantren Islam (Arabic: Muassasat al-Ma'hadil Islami) or The Islamic Boarding School Foundation. The school was originally built in Bondowoso in 1976, but five years later it was moved to Bangil.

PERSIS and Muhammadiyah schools also exist in the area. The PERSIS pesantren (boarding school) was established in Bangil following Ahmad Hassan's move from Bandung to Bangil, where he dedicated the rest of his life to teaching. Several PERSIS leaders, such as Muhammad Natsir and Muhammad Salim Nabhan were involved in the establishment.

Bangil's people adhere to different denominations: while they are mostly Sunni followers, there is growing number of Shi'ite followers, which believed is taught at YAPI.

=== PP Darullughah Wadda'wah ===
Habib Bahar bin Smith, founder of the Prophet's Defender Council, was educated in a Pesantren in southeast Bangil. That pesantren is no other than Pondok Pesantren Darullughah Wadda'wah (literally "Home of Clarity for His Face"), also spelled PP Darul Lughoh Wadda`wah, which is abbreviated PP Dalwa. As of 27 September 2024, the institution had 856 Google Maps reviews averaging about 4.6 stars and 129,800 Instagram followers.

== Cuisine ==
One of the favorite foods of Bangil is Nasi Punel or Punel rice. The word Punel is an anagram of the javanese word "pulen" (fluffier). This dish was initially sold from village to village in the morning by street vendors, but now can be found anywhere across the town. The rice is usually served on plate covered with a banana leaf. The rice is sprinkled with Serundeng, accompanied with Scallops Sate, Lentho (kind of fries, made of blackeyed pea and grated cassava) or Menjeng (oval-shape tempeh), Bali spices, sliced meat, grated coconut, bone gristle, and flavored and slightly sweet steamed coconut milk. Vegetables are usually shoots and young jackfruit. The main side dish can be Empal (fried meat), fried chicken, scrambled eggs, lung, beef Jerky or others. It is served with pestle spicy chilly sauce mixed with sliced green beans.
