= Tenggerese dialect =

Language of the Tenggerese people of East Java, Indonesia

Tenggerese
- Tengger Javanese
- Basa Tengger ꦧꦱꦠꦼꦁꦒꦼꦂ
- Pronunciation: [basa təŋgəɾ]
- Native to: Indonesia (East Java)
- Region: Areas surrounding Bromo Tengger Semeru National Park in Pasuruan Regency, Probolinggo Regency, Malang Regency, and Lumajang Regency
- Ethnicity: Tenggerese people
- Native speakers: 30,000 (2008)
- Language family: Austronesian: Malayo-Polynesian; Javanese; Tenggerese
- Early form: Old Javanese
- Dialects: Mororejo; Ngadas; Ngadirejo; Ngadisari; Sapikerep
- Writing system: Latin (Javanese alphabet); Javanese

Language codes
- ISO 639-3: tes
- Glottolog: teng1272
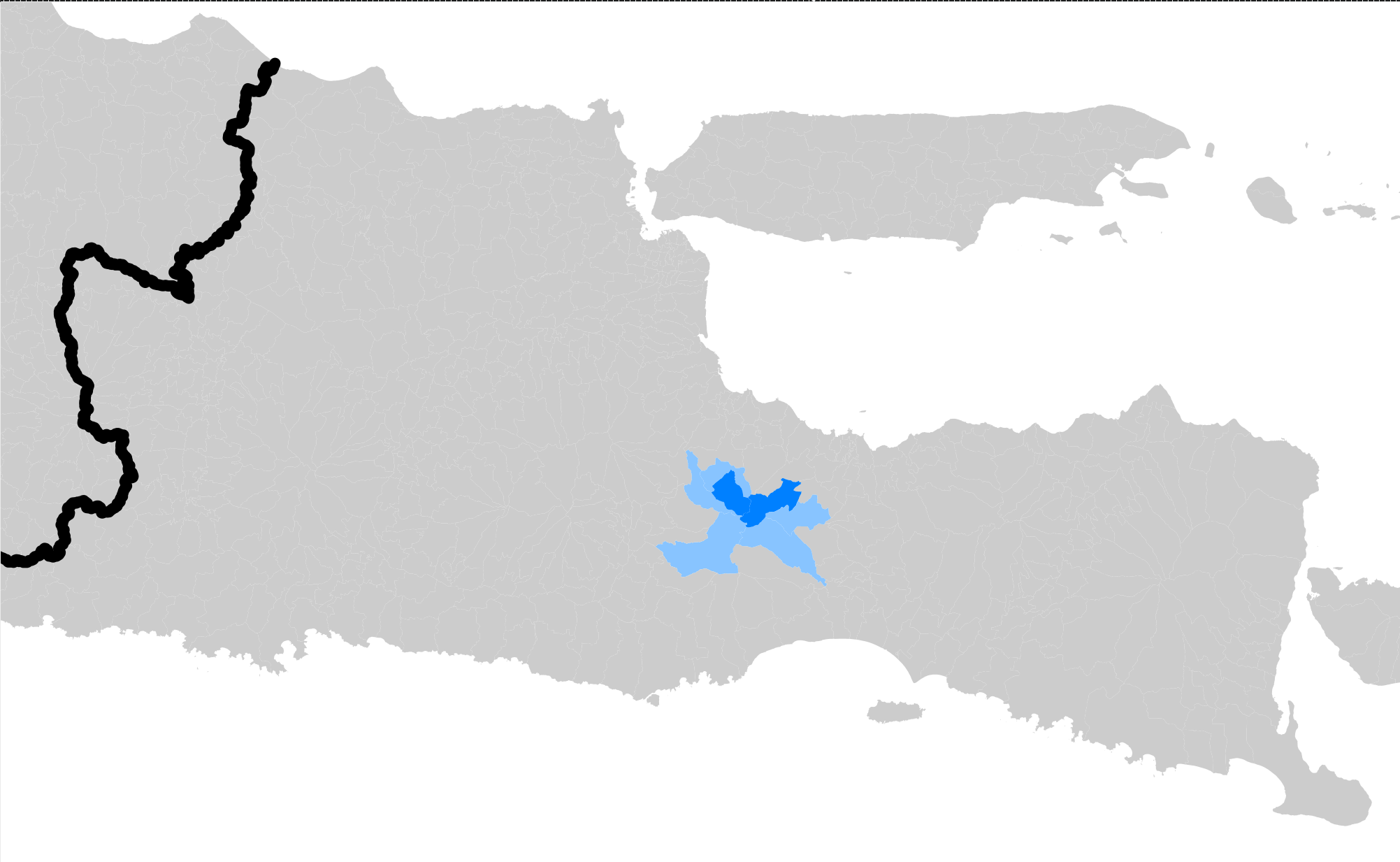
- Areas where Tenggerese is spoken by a majority of the population Areas where Tenggerese is spoken by a significant minority of the population

Tenggerese (Tenggerese: ꦧꦱꦠꦼꦁꦒꦼꦂ, Basa Tengger), sometimes referred to as Tengger Javanese, is a dialect of Javanese spoken by the Tenggerese people, a subgroup of the Javanese who live in villages located in the mountainous areas surrounding the Bromo Tengger Semeru National Park, administratively within the regencies of Pasuruan, Probolinggo, Malang, and Lumajang in East Java, Indonesia. The dialects differs from Surakarta Javanese, as it retains many features of Kawi, or Old Javanese, particularly in its phonology and vocabulary—a result of the geographic isolation of its speakers. Some linguists, however, consider Tenggerese a descendant of the ancient Kawi language, as it preserves archaic vocabulary no longer found in other Javanese dialects. The language closely related to Arekan Javanese and Osing language of Banyuwangi, which likewise preserves many features of Kawi. But in terms of pronunciation, this dialect is similar to the Banyumasan Javanese or Wonosobo dialect.

In the Tenggerese villages within the Bromo Tengger Semeru National Park, the Tenggerese language remains widely spoken as a means of daily communication and continues to be used in cultural practices and rituals such as ancestral worships. The Tengger language consists of several varieties and isolects that may differ between villages in vocabulary and grammar, largely due to geographic separation. In recent times, it has been increasingly influenced by the Arekan dialect of Javanese, which is widely spoken in East Java, as well as by Indonesian, the national language of Indonesia, particularly in formal domains such as education. Today, most Tenggerese people are bilingual or even trilingual. Code-switching between Tenggerese, Arekan Javanese, and Indonesian is common among the Tenggerese-speaking community, particularly in interactions with non-Tenggerese speakers.

== Terminology and classification ==
In local terminology, the Tengger language is known as Cārabasa Tengger or Piwākyan Tengger. The word cārabasa is thought to be a blend of the Old Javanese terms uccāraṇa and bhāṣa (from Sanskrit), meaning "word expression." Meanwhile, the term piwākyan, derived from the Old Javanese word wākya, carries the meaning "voice expression." The name Tengger itself refers to the ethnonym of the indigenous inhabitants of the Tengger Mountains and surrounding areas. The Tengger people call their language basa dhuwur 'high language' or Tengger Javanese, while the East Javanese dialect of Javanese (Arekan) is referred to as basa ngisor 'low language', a dialect spoken by communities living in the lowlands below the Tengger highlands. This distinction reflects the fact that all Tengger settlements are located at higher elevations compared to those of the Arekan Javanese.

Linguistically, the Tengger language is classified as a dialect of Javanese, which belongs to the Malayo-Polynesian branch of the Austronesian language family. Like other modern Javanese dialects, Tengger Javanese is derived from Middle Javanese, although it has retained a number of archaic lexical items. Genealogically, Tengger Javanese is part of the Eastern Javanese variety and is related to other Eastern Javanese dialect groups, particularly the Arekan dialect cluster (such as the Gresik and Malang–Surabaya dialects), as well as the Osing language. Unlike speakers of the Osing language, who reject the idea that Osing is a Javanese dialect, Tenggerese speakers openly acknowledge that their language is a dialect of Javanese.

== Geographic distribution and usage ==
Tenggerese is primarily spoken by the Tenggerese people who inhabit areas in and around the Bromo Tengger Semeru National Park in East Java, which is administratively divided among the regencies of Pasuruan, Probolinggo, Malang, and Lumajang. Tenggerese villages are concentrated in eastern Malang, southern Pasuruan, southwestern Probolinggo, and northwestern Lumajang. The Tengger people form the majority population in Tosari District (Pasuruan) and Sukapura District (Probolinggo). They are also found in several other villages, including Ledokombo, Pandansari, and Wonokerso in Sumber District (Probolinggo); Keduwung and Pusung Malang in Puspo District (Pasuruan); Kayu Kebek, Blarang, Andono Sari, and Ngadirejo in Tutur District (Pasuruan); Ngadas in Poncokusumo District (Malang); as well as Argosari and Ranu Pani in Senduro District (Lumajang). Of all the villages, only Ngadas and Ranu Pani fall within the boundaries of the Bromo Tengger Semeru National Park, and are therefore designated as protected conservation areas. Most of the Tengger villages are located in mountainous and rugged terrain at elevations of up to 2,100 meters above sea level. Their relative isolation—from one another as well as from the outside world—has not only helped preserve the language but also fostered noticeable variation in Tenggerese across different villages.

Tenggerese is the primary language used in daily communication within the Tengger community. It is mostly employed in informal and semi-formal settings, such as conversations with family and friends or in village meetings. In formal contexts, such as schools, Standard Javanese and Indonesian are generally used, although Tenggerese may also be spoken when the teachers are native Tengger speakers. The language also plays an important role in cultural life, being used in traditional ceremonies and rituals, particularly in the recitation of mantras and oral literature such as folktales. Traditional Tengger ceremonies, including weddings, continue to be conducted in Tenggerese. Tenggerese speakers, especially adults, are generally bilingual or trilingual. They are proficient in Tenggerese and Arekan Javanese (basa ngisor). Tenggerese is used in communication among fellow Tengger people, while basa ngisor is employed when speaking with non-Tengger Javanese. Although code-switching occurs when necessary, Tenggerese remains the consistent medium of communication within the community, even in the presence of outsiders. In addition, most speakers are fluent in Indonesian, the national language, and many also have competence in English, due to the Bromo Tengger Semeru National Park being a major tourist destination frequently visited by international travelers.

== Dialects and varieties ==
Tengger villages in and around the Bromo Tengger Semeru National Park are geographically separated by mountain slopes and forests, making them difficult to access. This isolation has contributed to the development of variations in the Tenggerese language, particularly in phonology and vocabulary. Nevertheless, these local differences are relatively minor, and the varieties remain mutually intelligible. The variety most commonly regarded as the "standard" is that of Ngadisari village in Sukapura, Probolinggo.

There are minor vocabulary differences among the various Tenggerese villages. For example, the word reyang 'I (male speaker)' is used in Ngadisari as a subject pronoun. In Ngadas village in Malang, however, although the word is known, it is never used; instead, the form eyang 'I (male speaker)' is employed, both as a subject and as a possessive suffix. Thus, the sentence Reyang kate nang pasar 'I want to go to the market', as spoken in Ngadisari, would be expressed in Ngadas as Eyang kate nang pasar. Another difference can be seen in the imperative form. In Ngadisari, the form gawanen 'bring [it]' is used consistently, whereas in Ngadas it becomes gawaen. Similarly, the Ngadisari form nak gawa 'bring [it]' corresponds to nik gawa in Ngadas. Certain Tenggerese varieties have also come under the influence of the Arekan dialect of Javanese, as reflected in the adoption of loanwords.

Phonological differences can be observed among the Tenggerese varieties spoken in different villages. In Pasuruan Regency, for example, the speech of Ngadirejo differs systematically from that of Mororejo. In Ngadirejo, the word for ‘you’ is siro /sirɔ/, while in Mororejo it is sira /sira/, showing a difference in the vowel phoneme. Similarly, in Ngadirejo the numeral ‘six’ is enem /ǝnǝm/, whereas Mororejo speakers use nenem /nǝnǝm/, which involves the addition of an extra syllable. A comparable pattern can be seen in the word for ‘sick’, which appears as loro /lɔrɔ/ in Ngadirejo but as lara /lara/ in Mororejo. In Sapikerep village in Sukapura, Probolinggo, the Tengger language often experiences code mixing with the Madurese language which is also spoken there.

== Phonology ==
Tenggerese, like many other regional languages in Indonesia, lacks a standardized phonological system. Nevertheless, many of the phonological system designed for Tenggerese is loosely based on standard Indonesian orthography, especially the system created by the Indonesian Ministry of Education, Culture, Research, and Technology.

Tenggerese differs from Standard Mataram Javanese in several phonological aspects. In Standard Javanese, the phoneme 'a' occurs only in closed ultima syllables, as in paran /paran/ ‘visit’, tekan /təkan/ ‘arrive’, and tandang /tandaɳ/ ‘work’. In contrast, the phoneme 'ɔ' appears in both open and closed ultima syllables, as in para /pɔrɔ/ ‘the’, teka /təkɔ/ ‘come’, tandha /tɔnɖɔ/ ‘sign’, lontong /lɔnʈɔŋ/ ‘rice cake’, and bolong /bɔlɔŋ/ ‘hollowed out’. In Tenggerese, however, the phoneme 'a' can occur in both open and closed ultima syllables, as in aba /aba/ ‘sound’, cora /cora/ ‘thief’, dewa /dewa/ ‘deity’, paran /paran/, sah /sah/ ‘separated’, and mihat /mihat/ ‘looking at’. Meanwhile, the phoneme 'ɔ' is restricted to closed ultima syllables, as in kokoh /kɔkɔh/ ‘rustic rice’, rondon /rɔndɔn/ ‘leaf’, and cor /cɔr/ ‘oath’.

=== Vowels ===
Like Standard Javanese, Tenggerese has six vowels. These vowels are /i/, /e/, /ə/, /a/, /u/, and /o/.

	Front	Central	Back
Close	i		u
Mid	e	ə	o
Open		a	

Notes:

- In writing, /e/ and /ə/ are both represented as ⟨e⟩.

=== Consonants ===
Tenggerese has 20 consonants.

		Labial	Dental	Alveolar	Retroflex	Palatal	Velar	Glottal
Nasal		m		n		ɲ	ŋ	
Plosive/ Affricate	voiceless	p	t		ʈ	t͡ʃ	k	
Plosive/ Affricate	voiced	b	d		ɖ	d͡ʒ	ɡ	
Fricative	voiceless			s				h
Fricative	voiced							
Lateral				l				
Semivowel		w				j		
Trill				r				

Notes: In writing, the following phonemes are represented as thus:

- /ŋ/ is ⟨ng⟩
- /ɲ/ is ⟨ny⟩
- /t͡ʃ/ is ⟨c⟩
- /d͡ʒ/ is ⟨j⟩
- /j/ is ⟨y⟩
- /ʈ/ is ⟨ṭ⟩ or ⟨th⟩
- /ɖ/ is ⟨ḍ⟩ or ⟨dh⟩

=== Diphthongs ===
There are seven diphthongs in Tenggerese: /ai/, /ae/, /ao/, /au/, /oa/, /ua/, and /uə/. Each of these diphthongs can appear in various positions within a word, including the medial and final positions, as shown below.

Diphthongs	Middle	Ending
/ai/	saiki 'right now'	
/ae/	saenake 'as one pleases'	wae 'only'
/ao/	laos 'galangal'	
/au/	saumur 'the same age'	mau 'just now'
/oa/	jejodoan 'to be married'	
/ua/		turua 'to sleep'
/ue/	tukuen 'to go buy'	

== Grammar ==
Tenggerese generally employs SVO word order like Standard Javanese. However, it can also exhibit VSO and occasionally VOS word order.

=== Affixes ===
Tenggerese, like many other Austronesian languages, is agglutinative, with base words modified through the extensive use of affixes. Affixation alters the meaning or grammatical function of the base word. Tenggerese employs a range of affixes, including prefixes, suffixes, infixes, and circumfixes. The table below presents examples of these affixes in use.

== Vocabulary ==
A few examples of words in Tenggerese dialect:

Tenggerese	Indonesian	Gloss
réyang	saya	I (for male)
isun	aku	I (for female)
tak	kata ganti aku/saya	pronoun I / me
sira	kamu	you
rika	kamu	you (for an older person)
awake dhewe	kita	we / us
orak, rak	tidak	no
masiya	meskipun	even though
kate	akan	will
hisa	bisa	can
teka	dari	from
teka	datang	come
picis	uang	money
njaré	bagaimana	how
sing	yang	which
oleh	dapat	get
apa / paran	what	apa
wong	orang	people
golek	cari	look for
ajok	jangan	don't
wae	saja	just
lek	kalau	if
lungguh	duduk	sit down
mulih	pulang	go home
wingi	kemarin	yesterday
sesuk	besok	tomorrow
saiki	sekarang	now
biyen	dahulu	formerly
ngapa	mengapa	why
maneh/meneh	lagi	again
nang	ke	to
ngene	begini	like this
ngono	begitu	like that
parek	dekat	near
kene	di sini	here
kana	disana	there
ndang / age	ayo	come on
melu	ikut	follow
ika/kae	itu (jauh)	that (far)
masuh	mencuci, membasuh	wash
mangan	makan	eat
luwe	lapar	hungry
temen	sangat	very
sega	nasi	rice
mesak'ên	kasihan	pity
jajal	coba	try
gaga	ladang	field
jaro	pagar	fence
irung	hidung	nose
jupuk	ambil	take
nandur	menanam	plan
dhuwur	tinggi	high
bêdhes, kethek	monyet	monkey

When the letter ⟨a⟩ is read as ⟨o⟩ in Surakarta Javanese, in Tenggerese it is still read as ⟨a⟩ such as the Banyumasan and Tegal Javanese dialects.

== Bibliography ==
- Conners, Thomas J. (2008). Tengger Javanese (PDF) (Ph.D. thesis). Yale University. hdl:10079/bibid/9845157. Archived from the original on 2 January 2023.
- Dwi Astuti Wahyu Nurhayati (2016). "Phonological system of Tengger dialect: In Ngoko speech level". Indonesian Journal of EFL and Linguistics. 1 (1): 1–12. doi:10.21462/ijefll.v1i1.3.
- Soedjito; Sunoto; Oetama, I.L. Marsoedi; H.A., Abdul Rachman; Hasan, Mansur (1984). Struktur Bahasa Jawa Dialek Tengger [Structure of the Tengger Javanese Dialect] (PDF) (in Indonesian). Jakarta: Agency for Language Development and Cultivation.
