= Ranu Tompe =

- Location within Java
- Location: Bromo Tengger Semeru National Park, East Java
- Coordinates: 8°03′S 112°58′E
- Type: Mountain lake
- Basin countries: Indonesia
- Surface elevation: 1,718 m (5,636 ft)

Ranu Tompe is a mountain lake located in Bromo Tengger Semeru National Park, East Java, Indonesia. Geographically, Ranu Tompe is isolated and far from human access. Ranu Tompe is only known from satellite images and maps of the area.
