= Segoro Puro =

- Village
- Location in Java
- Coordinates: 7.676935°S 112.974148°E
- Country: Indonesia
- Province: East Java
- Regency: Pasuruan Regency
- District: Rejoso
- Elevation: 33 ft (10 m)

Population
  - Total: 2,950
- Postal Code: 67181
- Area Code: 0343
- Website: rejoso.pasuruankab.go.id

Segoro Puro or Segoropuro ((मंदिर के समुद्री डाकू), ( Javanese script: ꦱꦼꦒꦺꦴꦫꦺꦴꦥꦸꦫꦺꦴ) a Javanese word literally means City of the Pirates) is a village in the Rejoso District, Pasuruan Regency, East Java, Indonesia. The village is well known as the place where the tomb (see map) of a Da'i, Sayyid Abdurrahim ibn Abdurrahman Basyeiban or better known as Sayyid Arif Segoropuro, is located.

== Climate ==
Segoropuro has a Tropical wet and dry climate, with distinct wet and dry seasons. The average annual high temperature in Segoropuro is around 85.83 °F (29.91 °C) and the average annual low temperature is 78.58 °F (25.88 °C). The village's wet season runs from May through Jan, while the dry season, where precipitation is less than 100 mm, covers the remaining three months. The temperature is relatively constant throughout the year with humidity is around 80% RH.

Climate data for Segoropuro
Month	Jan	Feb	Mar	Apr	May	Jun	Jul	Aug	Sep	Oct	Nov	Dec	Year
Mean daily maximum °C (°F)	28 (82)	29 (84)	30 (86)	32 (89)	32 (89)	31 (88)	30 (86)	30 (86)	30 (86)	30 (86)	29 (85)	28 (83)	29.91 (85.83)
Mean daily minimum °C (°F)	25 (77)	25 (77)	26 (78)	27 (80)	27 (80)	27 (80)	26 (79)	26 (79)	26 (79)	26 (79)	26 (78)	25 (77)	25.88 (78.58)
Average precipitation mm (inches)	103.5 (4.07)	56.5 (2.22)	56.1 (2.21)	39.8 (1.57)	107.5 (4.23)	128.5 (5.06)	189.1 (7.44)	132.9 (5.23)	161.4 (6.35)	171.2 (6.74)	288.4 (11.35)	369.8 (14.56)	1,804.7 (71.05)
Source: https://www.worldweatheronline.com/v2/weather-averages.aspx?q=7.676935,112.974148
