= Podokoyo =

- Location in East Java and Indonesia Podokoyo (Indonesia)
- Coordinates: 7°56′8.6″S 112°55′1.2″E
- Country: Indonesia
- Province: East Java
- Regency: Pasuruan Regency
- District: Tosari District
- Elevation: 7,671 ft (2,338 m)

Population (2010)
  - Total: 1,804
- Time zone: UTC+7 (Indonesia Western Standard Time)

Podokoyo is a village in Tosari district, Pasuruan Regency in East Java province, Indonesia. Its population is 1804.

== Climate ==
Podokoyo has a cold subtropical highland climate (Cwb) with heavy to very heavy rain in summer and light to moderate rainfall in winter. Being one of the coldest settlements in Java, its average temperature profile is identical to Skopje, North Macedonia as it contains strong oceanic characteristics.

Climate data for Podokoyo
Month	Jan	Feb	Mar	Apr	May	Jun	Jul	Aug	Sep	Oct	Nov	Dec	Year
Mean daily maximum °C (°F)	16.5 (61.7)	16.7 (62.1)	16.9 (62.4)	16.7 (62.1)	16.7 (62.1)	16.1 (61.0)	15.6 (60.1)	15.8 (60.4)	16.3 (61.3)	16.9 (62.4)	16.7 (62.1)	16.6 (61.9)	16.5 (61.6)
Daily mean °C (°F)	12.8 (55.0)	12.9 (55.2)	13.2 (55.8)	12.8 (55.0)	12.6 (54.7)	11.9 (53.4)	11.1 (52.0)	11.3 (52.3)	11.7 (53.1)	12.6 (54.7)	13.1 (55.6)	12.9 (55.2)	12.4 (54.3)
Mean daily minimum °C (°F)	9.2 (48.6)	9.1 (48.4)	9.6 (49.3)	9.0 (48.2)	8.6 (47.5)	7.8 (46.0)	6.7 (44.1)	6.8 (44.2)	7.2 (45.0)	8.3 (46.9)	9.5 (49.1)	9.2 (48.6)	8.4 (47.2)
Average rainfall mm (inches)	297 (11.7)	337 (13.3)	350 (13.8)	184 (7.2)	105 (4.1)	64 (2.5)	37 (1.5)	15 (0.6)	19 (0.7)	69 (2.7)	141 (5.6)	315 (12.4)	1,933 (76.1)
Source: Climate-Data.org
