= Rejoso, Pasuruan =

Rejoso
- District
- Location within Indonesia
- Coordinates: 7°40′53.76″S 112°57′24.85″E
- Country: Indonesia
- Province: East Java
- Regency: Pasuruan

Government
  - District Chief: HM. Hariadi, SH, M.Si

Area
  - Total: 37.00 km^{2} (14.29 sq mi)
- Elevation: 4 m (13 ft)

Population (mid 2024 estimate)
  - Total: 49,070
  - Density: 1,326/km^{2} (3,435/sq mi)
- Time zone: WIB (UTC+7)
- Postal code: 67181
- Area code: 0343
- Website: http://rejoso.pasuruankab.go.id

Rejoso is the name of a district (kecamatan) in Pasuruan Regency, East Java, Indonesia. The following is a list of the villages in the district:

- Arjosari
- Jarangan
- Karangpandan
- Kawisrejo
- Kedungbako
- Kemantrenrejo
- Ketegan
- Manikrejo
- Pandanrejo
- Patuguran
- Rejoso Kidul
- Rejoso Lor
- Sadengrejo
- Sambirejo
- Segoro Puro
- Toyaning
