= Tenggerese people =

Sub-ethnic group of Javanese

ꦮꦺꦴꦁꦡꦼꦁꦒꦼꦂ / ꦠꦶꦪꦁꦡꦼꦁꦒꦼꦂ / ꦥꦿꦶꦪꦤ꧀ꦠꦸꦤ꧀ꦡꦼꦁꦒꦼꦂ Wòng Tĕnggĕr / Tiyang Thěnggěr / Priyantun Thěnggěr
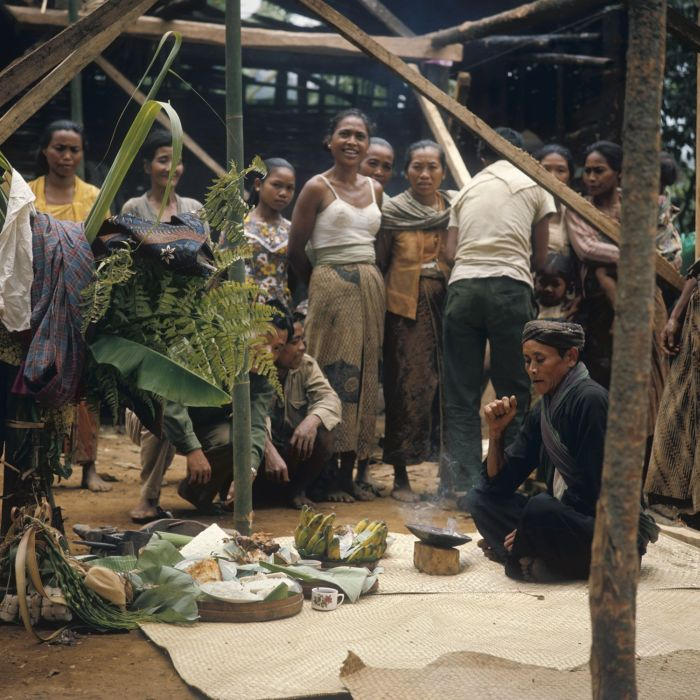
- Tenggerese offering (East Java)

Regions with significant populations
- Indonesia (East Java) Their population is concentrated in mountain region of the Bromo Tengger Semeru National Park (East Java) that including regency of: Pasuruan Regency; Probolinggo Regency; Malang Regency; Lumajang Regency

Languages
- native Javanese (Tenggerese dialect), also Indonesian, Old Javanese and Sanskrit (religious only)

Religion
- Predominantly Javanese Hinduism, small minority of Sunni Islam, Theravada Buddhism, and Christianity (Protestant)

Related ethnic groups
- Other Javanese sub-ethnic such as Arekan, Osing, Banyumasan, Cirebonese, etc.

The Tenggerese people (Note: Ngoko Javanese: ꦮꦺꦴꦁꦡꦼꦁꦒꦼꦂ, Madya Javanese: ꦠꦶꦪꦁꦡꦼꦁꦒꦼꦂ, Krama Javanese: ꦥꦿꦶꦪꦤ꧀ꦠꦸꦤ꧀ꦡꦼꦁꦒꦼꦂ, Ngoko Gêdrìk: wòng Tĕnggĕr, Madya Gêdrìk: tiyang Tĕnggĕr, Krama Gêdrìk: priyantun Tĕnggĕr, Indonesian: suku Tengger)) are a sub-ethnic group of Javanese in eastern Java who are centered in the isolated Tengger mountains (Mount Bromo) in the Bromo Tengger Semeru National Park in eastern Java. The majority of the Tenggerese population profess Java Hinduism as their religion. They are the only Javanese ethnic group who have remained Hindu since the Majapahit era after the Osing people, who have been Islamized.

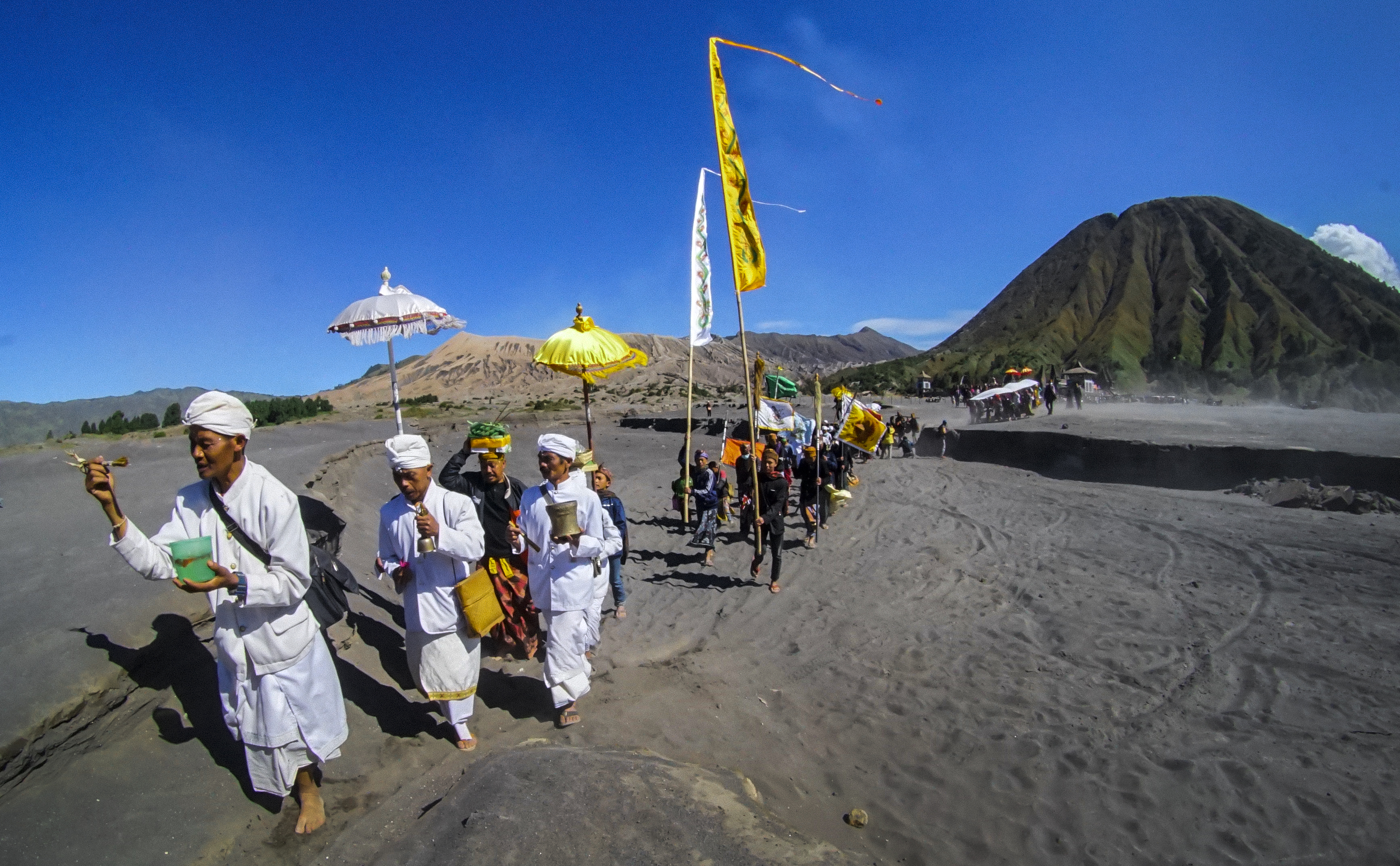
Tenggerese Melasti ceremony (a Balinese influence ceremony ritual) on Mount Bromo the only native Hindu majority ethnic groups on the island.

Scattered communities of Tenggerese also exist in the Pasuruan, Probolinggo, Malang, and Lumajang regencies of eastern Java. They are traditionally believed to be the descendants of the legendary Roro Anteng and Joko Seger. The Tenggerese are considered an ethnic sub-group of the Javanese people. Tengger people do not have a caste system. Their traditions are rooted in customs originating from the Majapahit Empire.

== History ==
Before the 15th century, the Tenggerese people were closely linked with the Majapahit and other kingdoms. According to legend, Jaka Seger and Roro Anteng are the ancestors of the Tenggerese.

== Language ==
The Tenggerese speak an archaic Javanese (Majapahit) dialect called Tengger Javanese. Elements of modern Javanese influences can be heard in their speech. They have their own written Kawi script based on the old Javanese Brahmi type.

== Religion ==
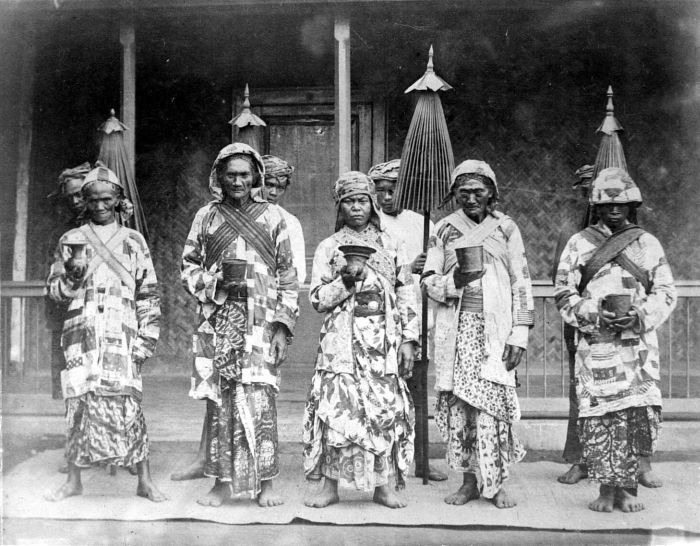
Tengger priests during the Dutch East Indies era

Majority of Tenggerese population profess Java Hinduism as their religion, although they have incorporated Buddhist and Animist elements. Like the Balinese, they worship Ida Sang Hyang Widi Wasa (roughly "Big Almighty Lord") for blessings in addition to other Hindu and Buddhist deities that include the Tri Murti (Shiva, Brahma, Vishnu) and Buddha. Their places of worship include the Punden, Poten and Danyang. The Poten is a sacred area of ground at Mount Bromo's sand sea and becomes the focus of the annual Kasada Ceremony. In the Poten, it contains several buildings and enclosures, arranged in a specific composition called the Mandalas (zones).

The Tenggerese also worship a host of spirits (ancestor worship). They include cikal bakal, the spirits of the founders of the village, the roh bahurekso, the village guardian spirits and the roh leluhur, the spirits of the ancestors. Rituals to propitiate these spirits are conducted by special priests. During these rites small doll-like figures representing the spirits are clothed in batik cloth and are presented with food and drink. It is believed that the spirits partake of the essence of these offerings. The Bromo volcano is considered one of the most sacred places. If it erupts, they believe that their god is very angry.

The Tenggerese give food offerings to the gods.

- Sajenan is presented to the guardian deities by the priest in formal liturgy. For different occasions foods are offered as Sajenan. For instance, during weddings a cone of rice, Tumpeng Walagara, is offered. It is considered to be a source of blessing for the couple and the whole village.
- Suguhan are offered by ordinary Tengger Hindus to their ancestral spirits.
- Tamping are food offerings to evil spirits to ward off bad luck and typically consist of meat, rice and bananas wrapped up in leaves and put at places such as cemeteries, bridges, and road intersections.

The priests are called Dukun or Resi Pujangga; they play a middle role in their religious worship. They are believed to possess spiritual knowledge of the gods and the spirits called Ilmu, which they carefully guard from ordinary Tenggers. Priesthood is hereditary and generally passes down from father to son. Each village has only one of these priests, with three assistants — Legen, Sepuh, and Dandan.

In the past few decades, due to overpopulation in Madura, many Madurese settlers exploited the Tenggerese land by clearing some of their nature reserves and converting 2-3% (up to 10,000) of the Tenggerese to Islam in the process — particularly those in the more accessible areas in the lowlands just outside the Tengger range. Because of this Islamic missionary activity, the remaining Hindu Tenggerese asked the Balinese Hindus for help by reforming their culture and religion closer to the Balinese. The Indonesian government declared the Tengger mountains as the Bromo-Tengger-Semeru national park and declared that any more logging in this area is an illegal act, therefore protecting the Tenggerese from further disruption.

== Lifestyle ==
The Tenggerese are basically either agriculturalists or nomadic herders. The agriculturalists generally live on the lower altitudes, while the nomads live on the higher altitudes, riding on small horses.

== Festivals ==
=== Yadnya Kasada ===
The main festival of the Tenggerese is the Yadnya Kasada, which lasts about a month. On the 14th day of the Kasada, the Tenggerese go to Poten Bromo and ask for blessing from the main deity Hyang Widi Wasa and Mahadeva, the God of the Mountain (Mount Semeru), by offerings rice, fruit, vegetables, flowers, livestock and other local produce. They also see the examination of the medicine men memorizing prayers. The medicine man who passes the exam is chosen to be the spiritual leader of the Tengger tribe.

The origin of this festival is a legend that dates back to the Majapahit kingdom, during the reign of King Brawijaya; the queen of the kingdom gave birth to a daughter named Roro Anteng, who married Jaka Seger, a young man from the Brahmin caste.

According to the legend, Roro Anteng and Jaka Seger were among many others who fled from the tattering Majapahit kingdom during the 15th century, when the declining kingdom was in the brink of collapse while the rapid spread of Islam in Java has begun. The couple and their followers later settled in the Tengger mountains and ruled the region jointly under the title Purbawisesa Mangkurat Ing Tengger. Tradition holds belief that they are ancestors of modern Tengger people.

For a few years the Tenggerese people flourished under the leadership of Jaka Seger and Roro Anteng, yet the king and queen were unhappy for they had no children. Desperate, they climbed to the top of Mount Bromo and prayed for help. Deeply moved by the couple's depth faith, the god of Mount Bromo assured them of offspring but with the condition that the youngest child be sacrificed in the crater of the volcano. After giving birth to 25 children, the time came for Roro Anteng to fulfill her part of the pledge. Though reluctant, they were threatened with catastrophe, forcing them to fulfill their pledge and comply with the god's wishes. They had no choice but to sacrifice their 25th child, Kesuma, by throwing him into the crater. In an alternate story, Kesuma was taken and consumed by the fire arising from the crater when he was about to flee from Mount Bromo. The Tengger people then started to commemorate this festival.

== See also ==
- Banyumasan
- Eastern salient of Java
- Hinduism in Java
- Javanese
- Osing
- Yadnya Kasada
