= Bromo Tengger Semeru National Park =

National park in East Java, Indonesia

- Taman Nasional Bromo Tengger Semeru
- IUCN category II (national park)
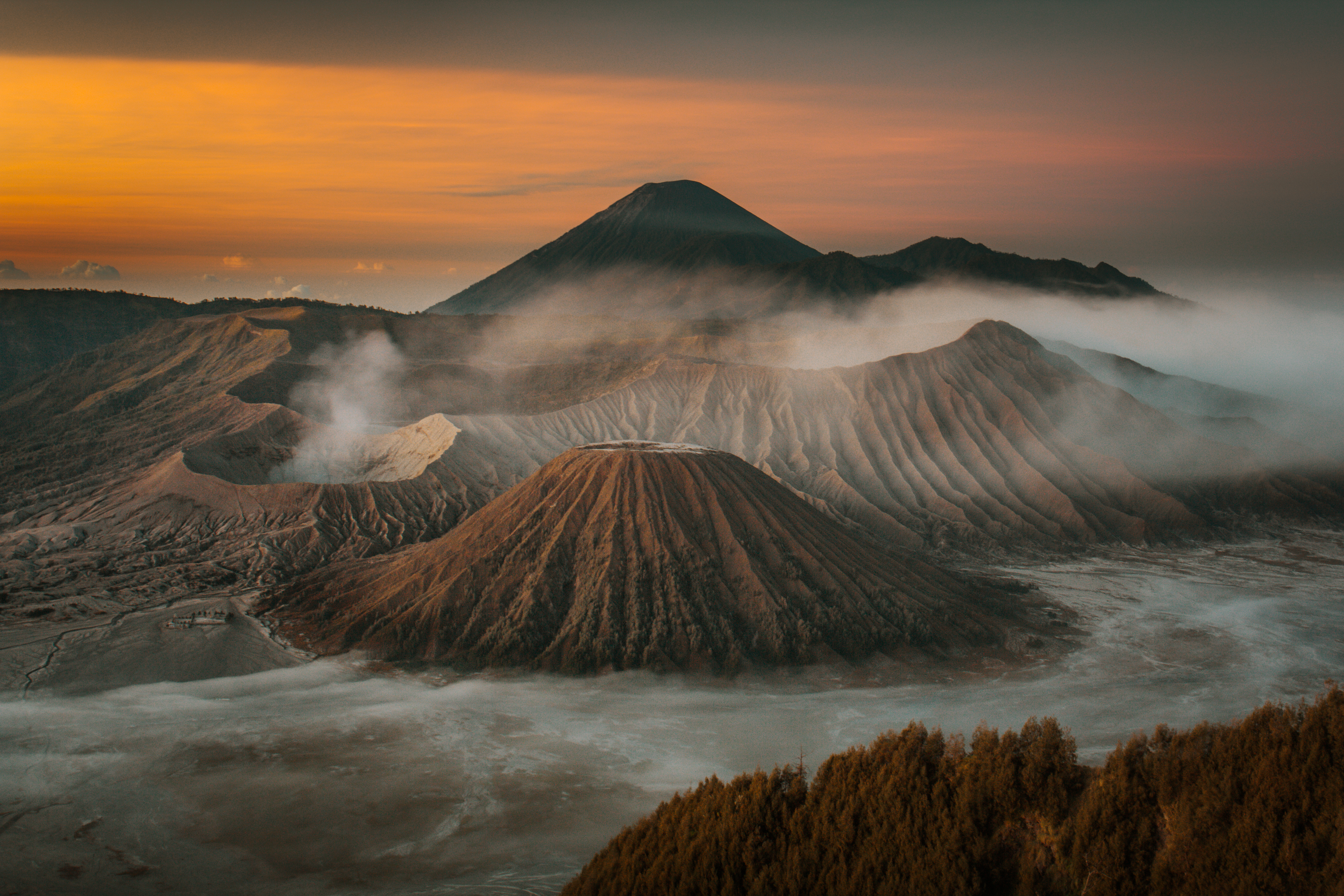
- Sunrise in the steaming crater of Mount Bromo with stately Mount Semeru imposing in the background.

- Location within Java Location within Indonesia
- Location: East Java, Indonesia
- Nearest city: Malang Regency, Lumajang Regency, Pasuruan, Probolinggo
- Coordinates: 8°1′S 112°55′E
- Area: 50,276 hectares (124,230 acres; 502.76 km^{2})
- Max. elevation: 3,676 m (12,060 ft)
- Established: October 14, 1982
- Visitors: 61,704 (in 2007)
- Governing body: Ministry of Environment and Forestry
- Website: bromotenggersemeru.org

Bromo Tengger Semeru National Park (Indonesian: Taman Nasional Bromo Tengger Semeru; abbreviated as TNBTS) is a national park located in East Java, Indonesia, to the east of Malang, to the west of Lumajang, to the south of Pasuruan and Probolinggo, and to the southeast of Surabaya, the capital of East Java. It is the only conservation area in Indonesia that has a sand sea, the Tengger Sand Sea (Indonesian: Laut Pasir Tengger), across which is the caldera of an ancient volcano (Tengger) from which four new volcanic cones have emerged. This unique feature covers a total area of 5,250 hectares at an altitude of about 2,100 meters (6,900 ft). The massif also contains the highest mountain in Java, Mount Semeru (3,676 meters (12,060 ft)), four lakes (including, the isolated Ranu Tompe), and 50 rivers. It is named after the Tenggerese people. The explosion of the volcano that created the caldera, happened ca. 45.000 years ago, in an event similar to the Krakatau eruption.

The Tengger Sand Sea has been protected since 1919. The Bromo Tengger Semeru National Park was declared a national park in 1982.

== Geography ==
=== Tengger massif ===
Interactive map of Bromo Tengger Semeru National Park

The Tengger massif is a massif within the park. The area is an active volcanic complex surrounded by a plain of sand.

=== Volcanism ===
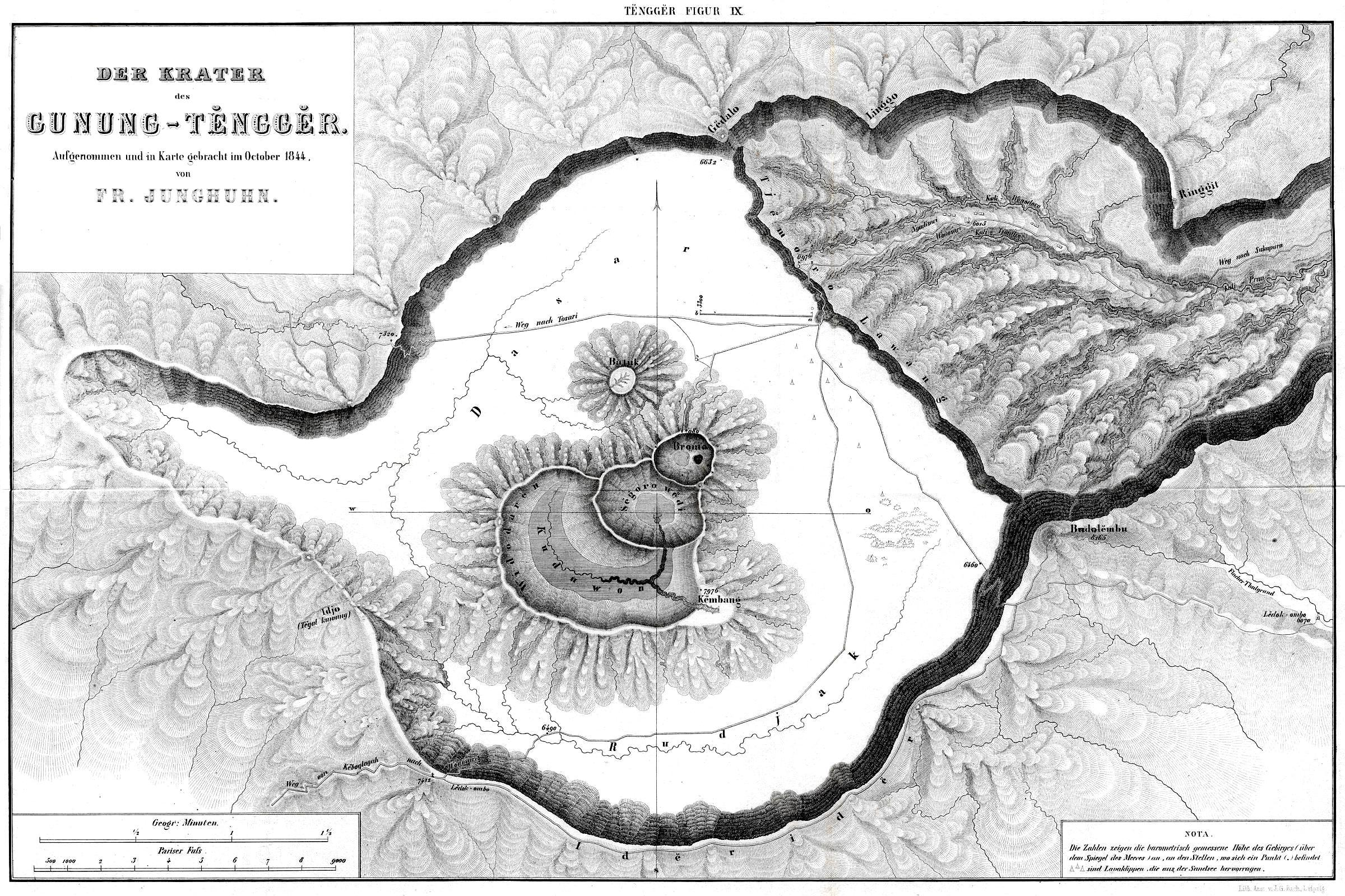
19th century map of Tengger Caldera showing several volcanoes forming within the vast Tengger Caldera

The volcanic complex of Tengger forms a condition where a new caldera of volcano forms inside a larger and more ancient caldera. There are five volcanoes inside the Tengger Caldera: Mount Bromo (2,329 m), Mount Batok (2,470 m), Mount Kursi (2,581 m), Mount Watangan (2,661 m), and Mount Widodaren (2,650 m). Mount Batok is the only peak that is no longer active, and is covered in casuarina (Indonesian: cemara) trees. Mount Widodaren, located beside Mount Batok, contains the cave Widodaren, which is considered sacred by local people.

The five volcanoes within the caldera are surrounded by a vast area of sand called the Tengger Sand Sea, which in turn is surrounded by a steep crater wall of the larger Tengger Caldera with height differences of about 200–600 meters (660–1,970 ft). Other mountains around the Tengger caldera are: Mount Pananjakan (2,770 m (9,090 ft)), Mount Cemorolawang (2,227 m (7,306 ft)), Mount Lingker (2,278 m (7,474 ft)), Mount Pundak Lembu (2,635 m (8,645 ft)), Mount Jantur (2,705 m (8,875 ft)), Mount Ider-ider (2,527 m (8,291 ft)) and Mount Mungal (2,480 m (8,140 ft)). The peak of Mount Pananjakan is the most popular place to watch the entire volcanic complex of Tengger.

Further south in the national park, there is another volcanic complex called the Semeru Group or Jambangan Group. This area contains the highest peak of Java, Mount Semeru (3,676 m (12,060 ft)). Other mountains within this area are Mount Lanang (2,313 m (7,589 ft)), Mount Ayek-ayek (2,819 m (9,249 ft)), Mount Pangonan Cilik (2,833 m (9,295 ft)), Mount Keduwung (2,334 m (7,657 ft)), Mount Jambangan (3,020 m (9,910 ft)), Mount Gentong (1,951 m (6,401 ft)), Mount Kepolo (3,035 m (9,957 ft)), and Mount Malang (2,401 m (7,877 ft)). The Semeru forest area has many rivers that are former lava lines from Mount Semeru. The Semeru group is considered to be very productive, producing volcanic matters such as lava, volcanic ash, and hot cloud and spreading it to the surrounding area. The lower area is surrounded with fertile rice fields.

=== Climate ===
The climate in Bromo Tengger Semeru is cold, especially in winter from May until September. There is heavy rainfall in summer, while there is little to no precipitation in winter. Nighttime temperatures in winter commonly fall below zero degrees Celsius, with potential for frost and light snow. It is classified as subtropical highland climate.

Climate data for Podokoyo, Tosari, Bromo Tengger Semeru National Park (elevation 2,338 m or 7,671 ft)
Month	Jan	Feb	Mar	Apr	May	Jun	Jul	Aug	Sep	Oct	Nov	Dec	Year
Mean daily maximum °C (°F)	16.5 (61.7)	16.7 (62.1)	16.9 (62.4)	16.7 (62.1)	16.7 (62.1)	16.1 (61.0)	15.6 (60.1)	15.8 (60.4)	16.3 (61.3)	16.9 (62.4)	16.7 (62.1)	16.6 (61.9)	16.5 (61.6)
Daily mean °C (°F)	12.8 (55.0)	12.9 (55.2)	13.2 (55.8)	12.8 (55.0)	12.6 (54.7)	11.9 (53.4)	11.1 (52.0)	11.3 (52.3)	11.7 (53.1)	12.6 (54.7)	13.1 (55.6)	12.9 (55.2)	12.4 (54.3)
Mean daily minimum °C (°F)	9.2 (48.6)	9.1 (48.4)	9.6 (49.3)	7 (45)	6.6 (43.9)	0.8 (33.4)	0 (32)	2.8 (37.0)	6.2 (43.2)	8.3 (46.9)	9.5 (49.1)	9.2 (48.6)	6.5 (43.8)
Average precipitation mm (inches)	297 (11.7)	337 (13.3)	350 (13.8)	184 (7.2)	105 (4.1)	64 (2.5)	37 (1.5)	15 (0.6)	19 (0.7)	69 (2.7)	141 (5.6)	315 (12.4)	1,933 (76.1)
Source: Climate-Data.org (temp & precip)

== Ecosystem ==
According to height and temperature differences, the forests within the area can be classified into three zones:

=== Sub-montane zone (750–1,500 m) ===
This zone is classified as a tropical rainforest. It can be found in the southern area of Semeru, East Semeru (Burno), and West Semeru (Patok Picis). This zone is dominated with plants of the families Fagaceae, Moraceae, Anacardiaceae, Sterculiaceae, and Rubiaceae. There are also liana trees, such as a variety from the genus Calamus, Piper, Asplenium, and Begonia, and other plants from the family Araceae, Poaceae, and Zingiberaceae. There are also 225 species of orchid in this area.

=== Montane zone (1,500–2,440 m) ===
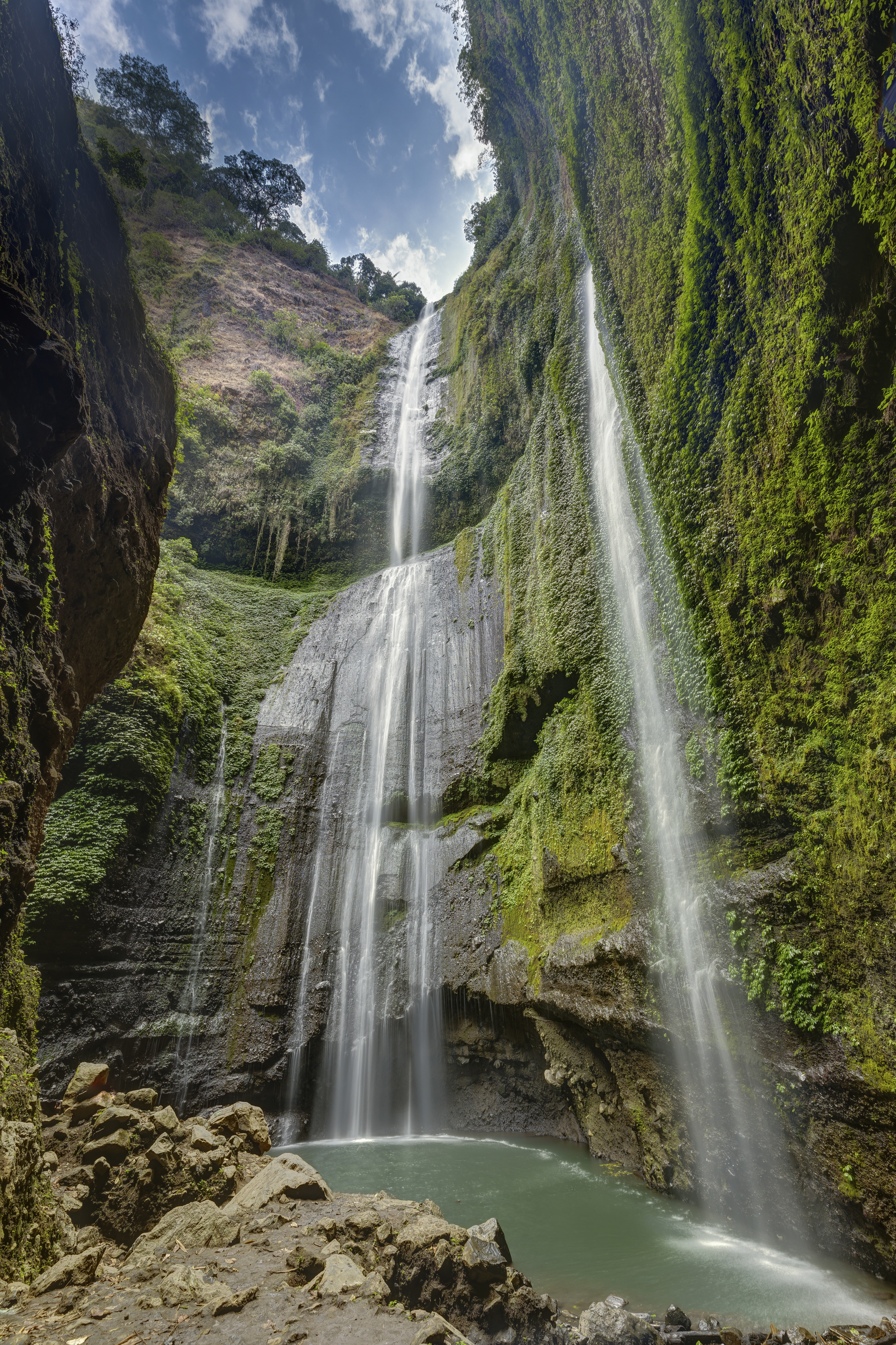
Madakaripura Waterfall

Plant life is greatly reduced in this area. Most of the species that grow in this area are pioneer species. There are also some wooden plants such as cemara (Casuarina junghuhniana), mentinggi gunung (Vaccinium varingifolium), kemlandingan gunung (Albizia lophantha), acacia bark (Acacia decurrens) and bottom plants such as Javanese edelweiss or senduro (Anaphalis longifongila and Anaphalis javanica), Imperata cylindrica, Pteris sp., Themeda sp. and Centella asiatica.

The Tengger Sand Sea in Tengger Caldera is a special ecosystem. The area is covered in volcanic sedimentation of sand from Mount Bromo activities. The resulting area is believed to be the only known desert-like area in Indonesia. The Tengger Sand Sea has been protected since 1919.

=== Subalpine zone (above 2,400 m) ===
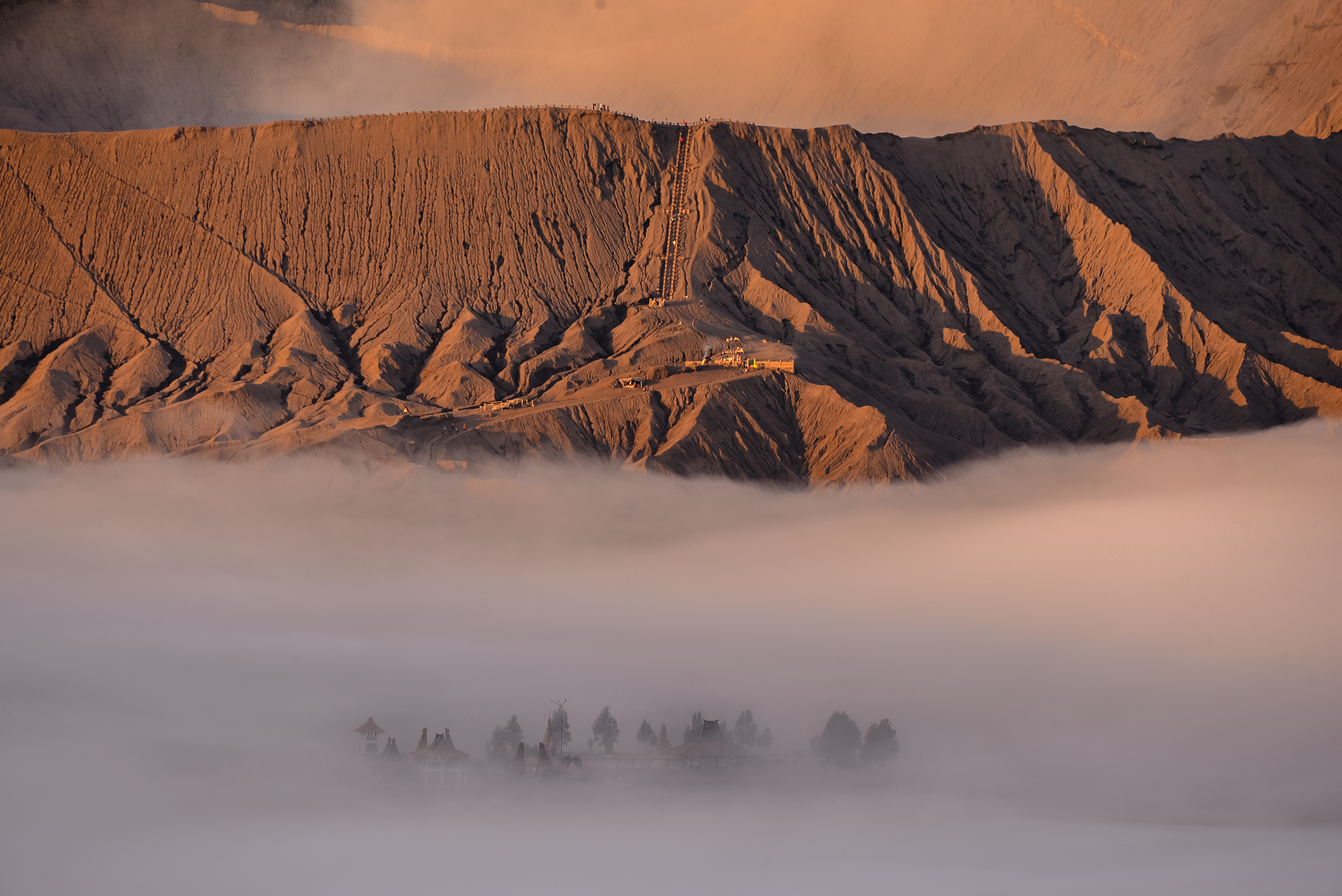
The steps leading to the rim of Mount Bromo's crater are clearly visible; below them lies the Pura Luhur Poten Bromo temple, shrouded in mist.

The flora that cover this area are mentinggi gunung (Vaccinium varingifolium) and cemara (Casuarina junghuhniana). Kemlandingan gunung (Albizia lophantha) and Javanese edelweiss can also be found growing in this zone.

On Mount Semeru, there is no plant life above the altitude of 3,100 m. This zone is covered in loose sandstones.

== Flora and fauna ==
Some endangered flora are protected in this park, such as Fagaceae, Moraceae, Sterculiaceae, Casuarina junghuhniana, Javanese edelweiss, and about 200 species of endemic orchids.There is a relatively small diversity of fauna in the Bromo Tengger Semeru National Park. There are about 137 species of birds, 22 species of mammals and 4 species of reptiles protected in the national park. Examples are besra, green peafowl, Javan rusa, Sumatran dhole, crab-eating macaque, marbled cat and Javan leopard.

== Culture ==
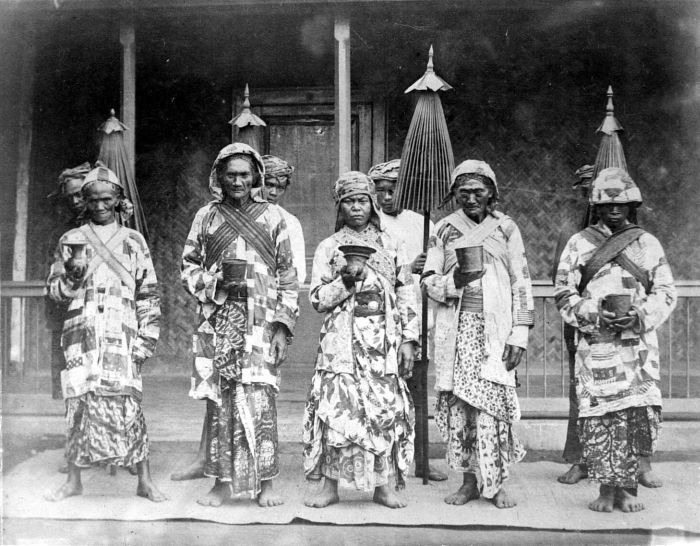
The Hindu priests of the Tengger people

The area in and around the park is inhabited by the Tengger people, one of the few significant Hindu communities remaining on the island of Java. Their population of roughly 600,000 is centered in thirty villages in the isolated Tengger mountains including Mount Bromo and areas within the park. The local religion is a remnant from the Majapahit era and therefore quite similar to that on Bali but with even more animist elements. The Tengger people are believed to be descendants of the Majapahit empire and were driven into the hills after mass arrival in the area of Muslim Madurese in the 19th century.

== Gallery ==
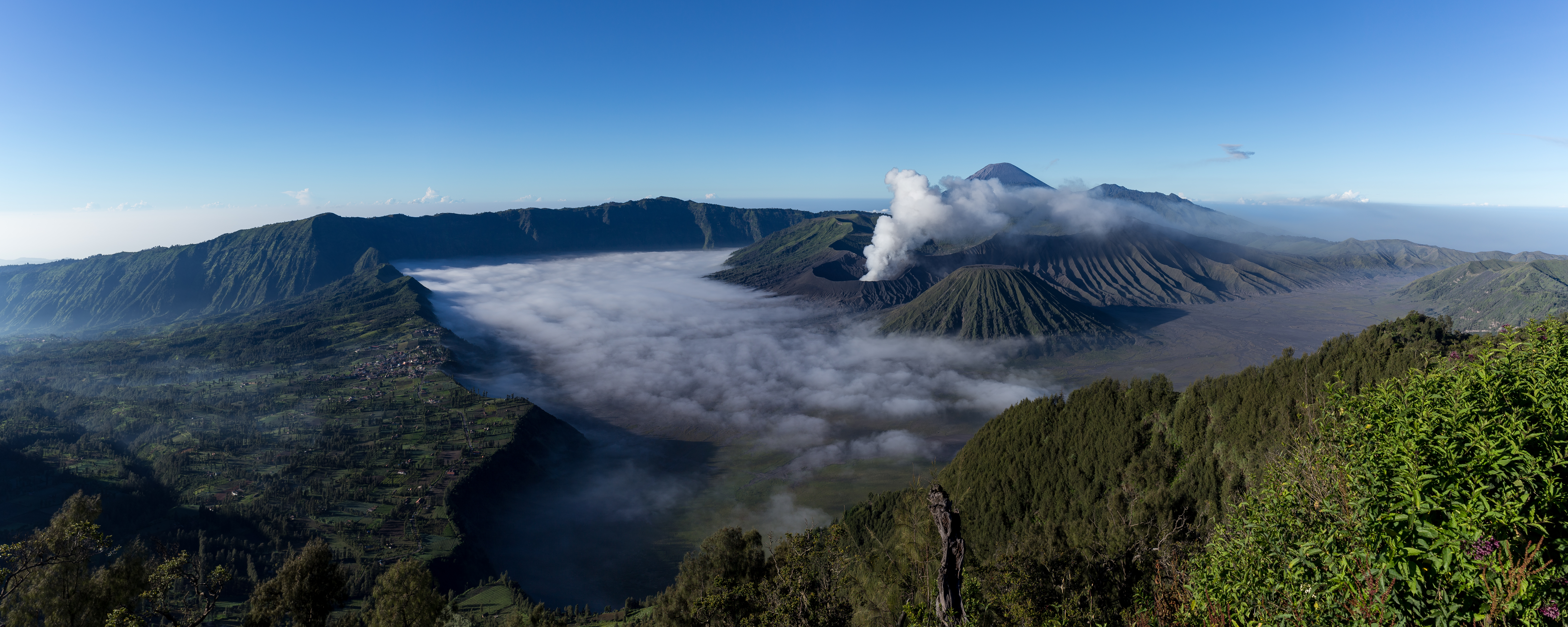
Vicinity of Bromo-Tengger-Semeru National Park (clickable image)

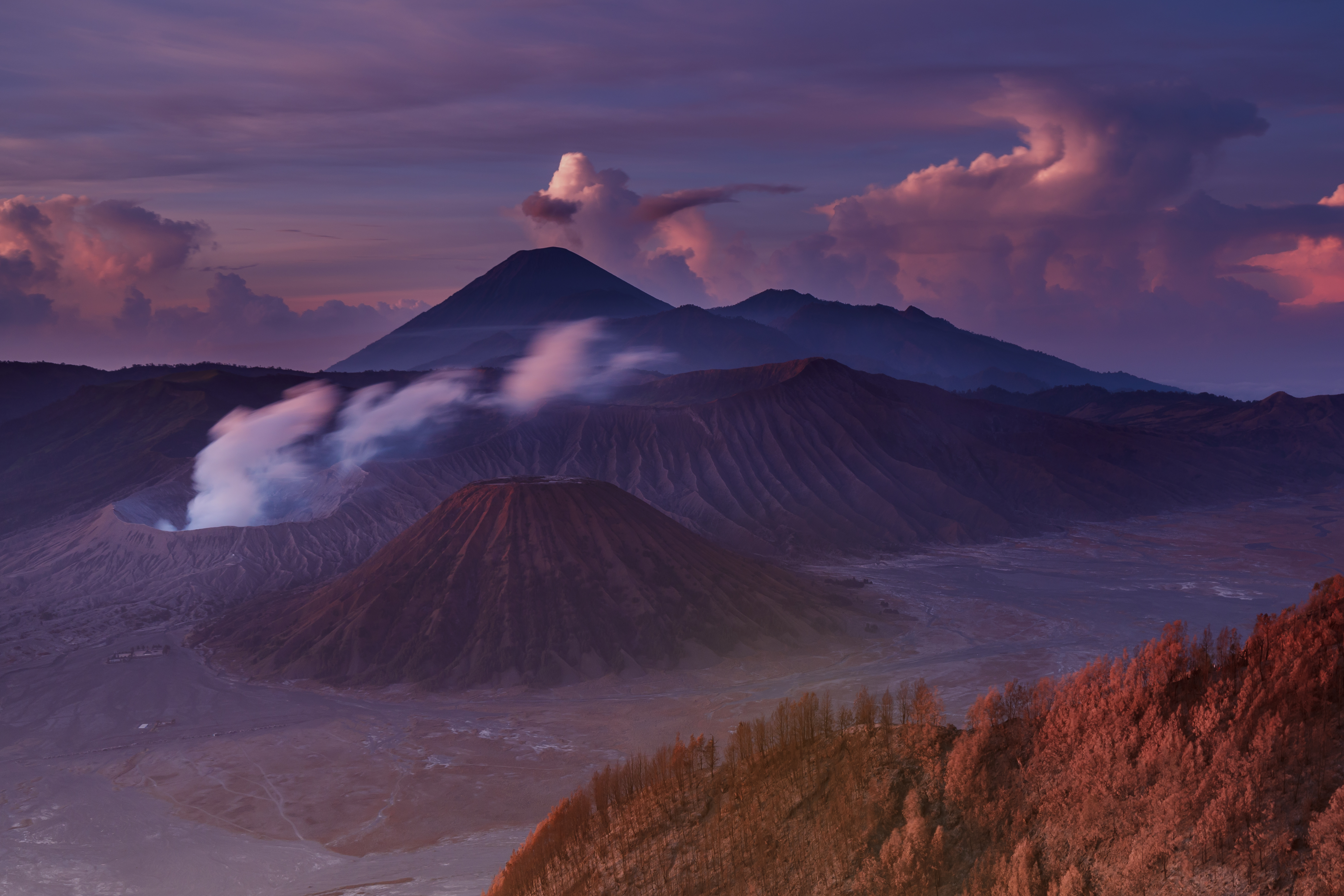
Gunung Bromo sunrise

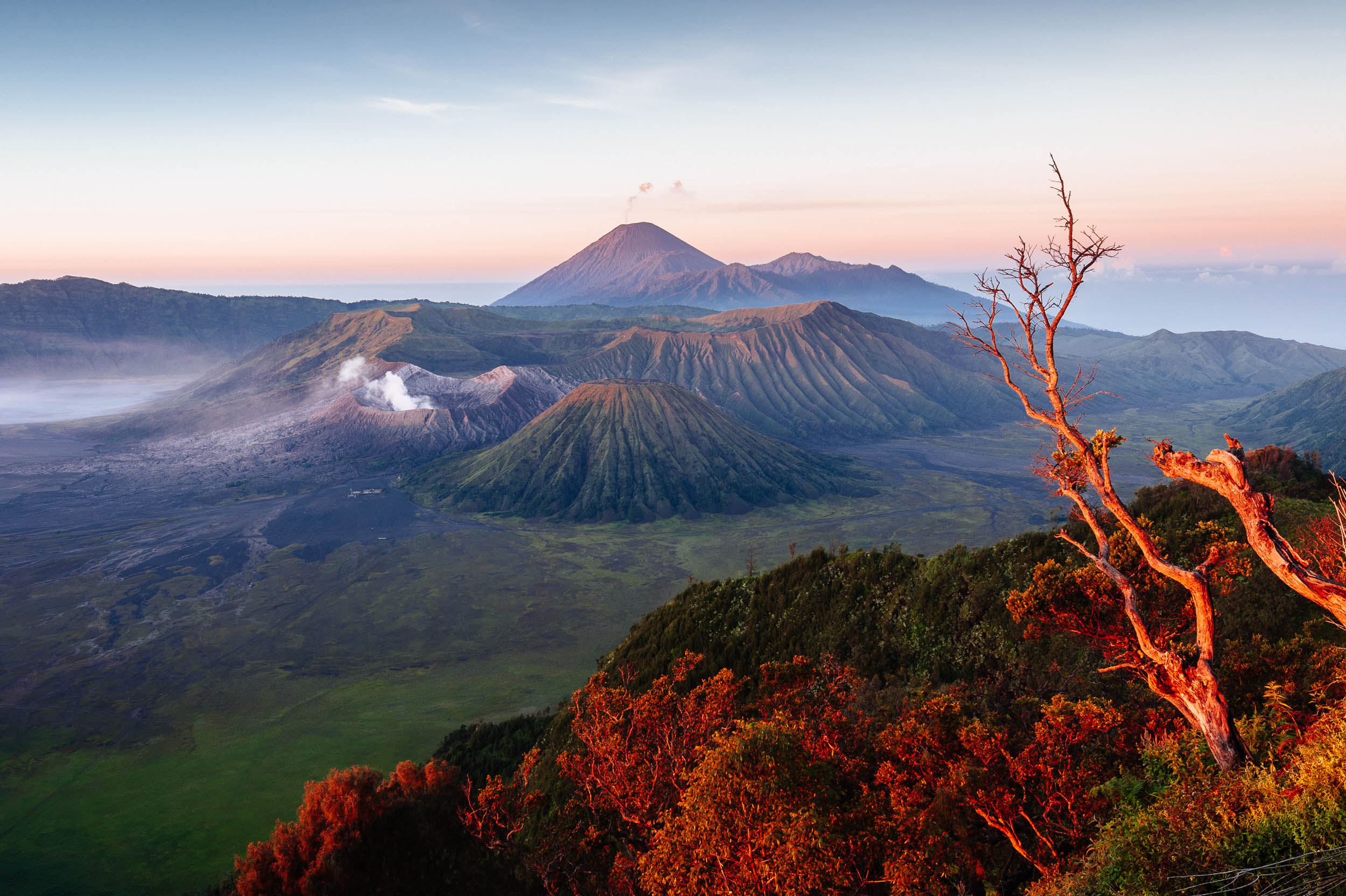
Tengger Caldera at sunrise

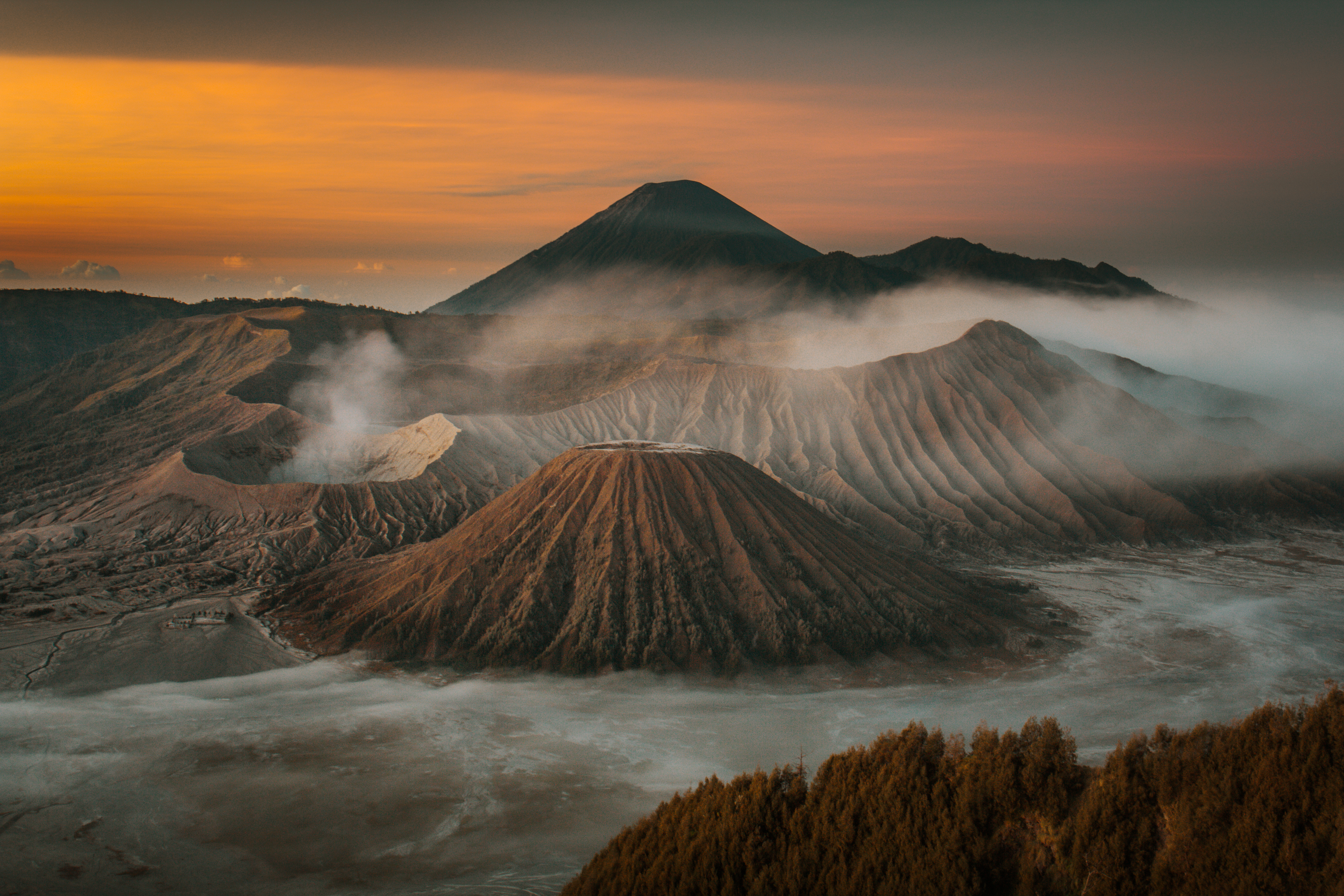
Golden hour over the park

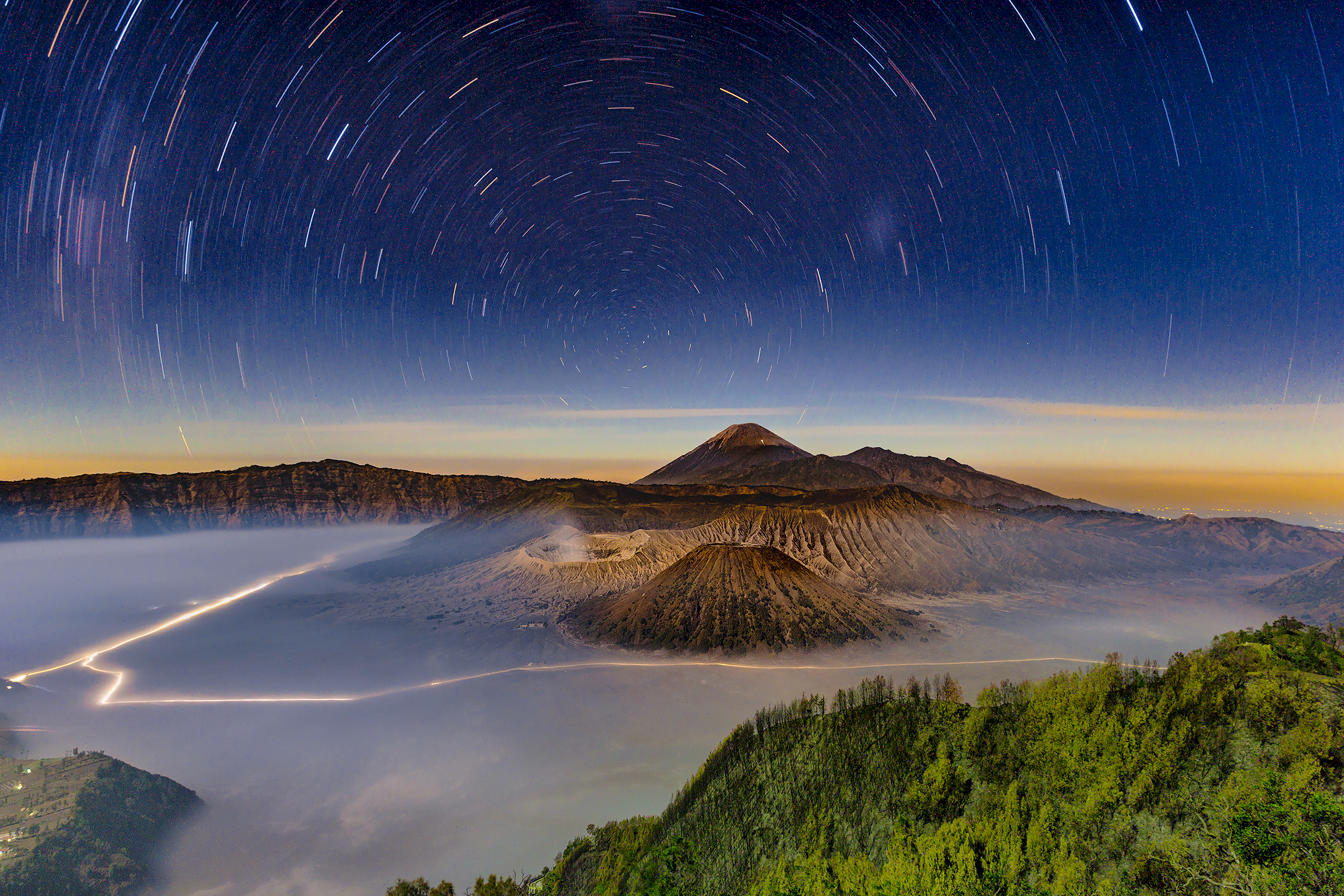
Long exposure photo of the park

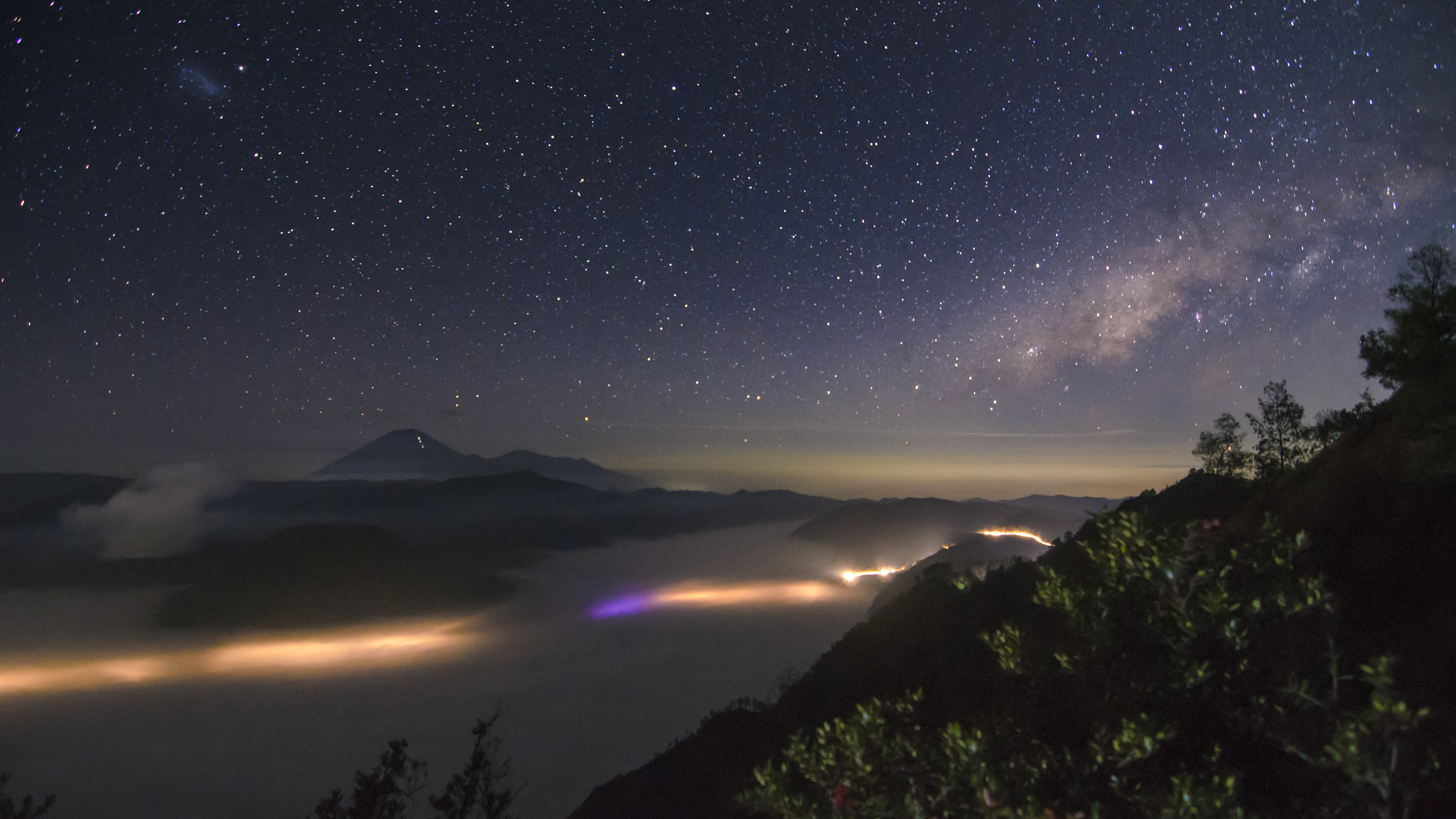
Tengger caldera at night, with the Milky Way visible

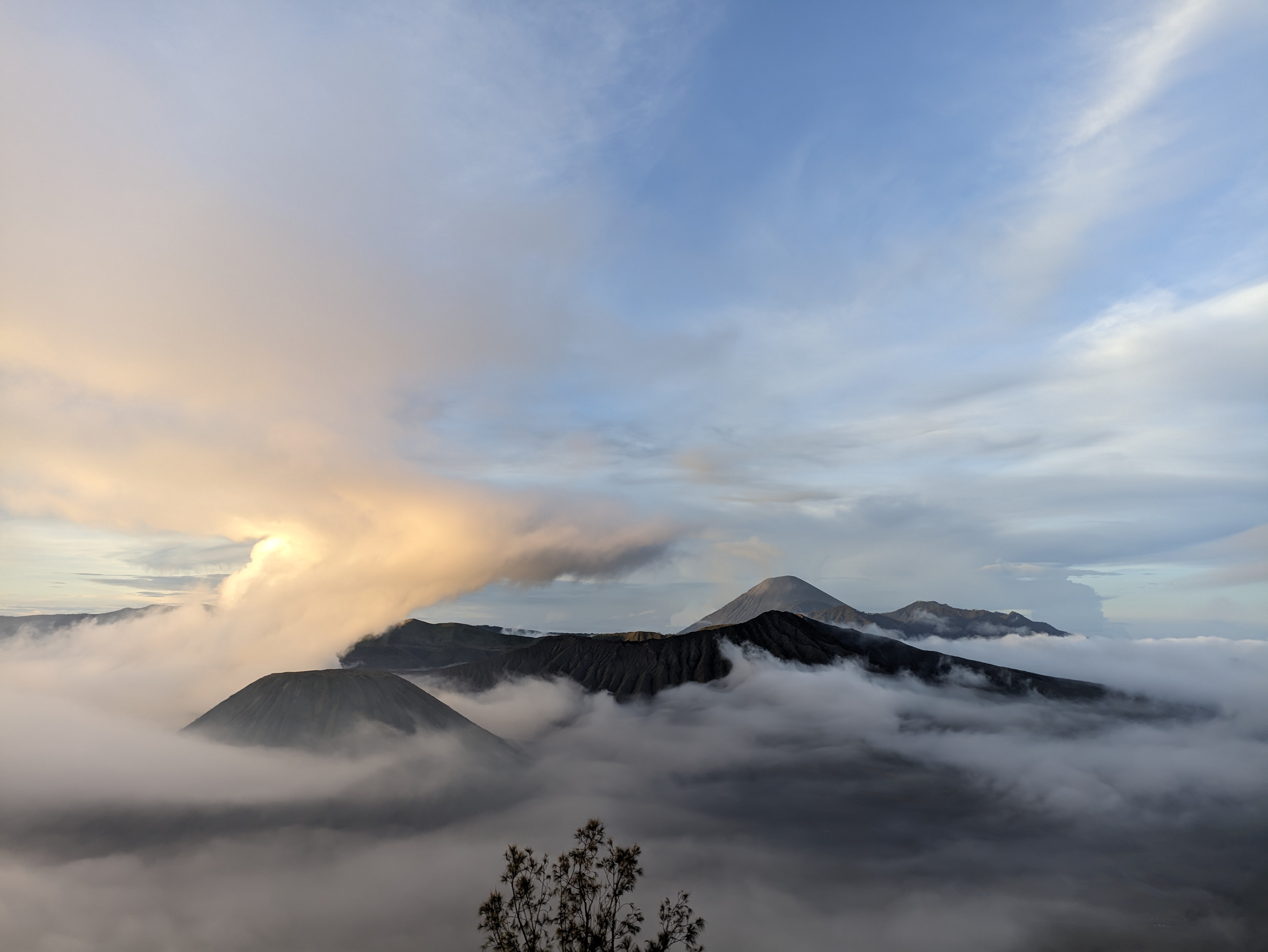
Tengger caldera sunrise on a foggy day

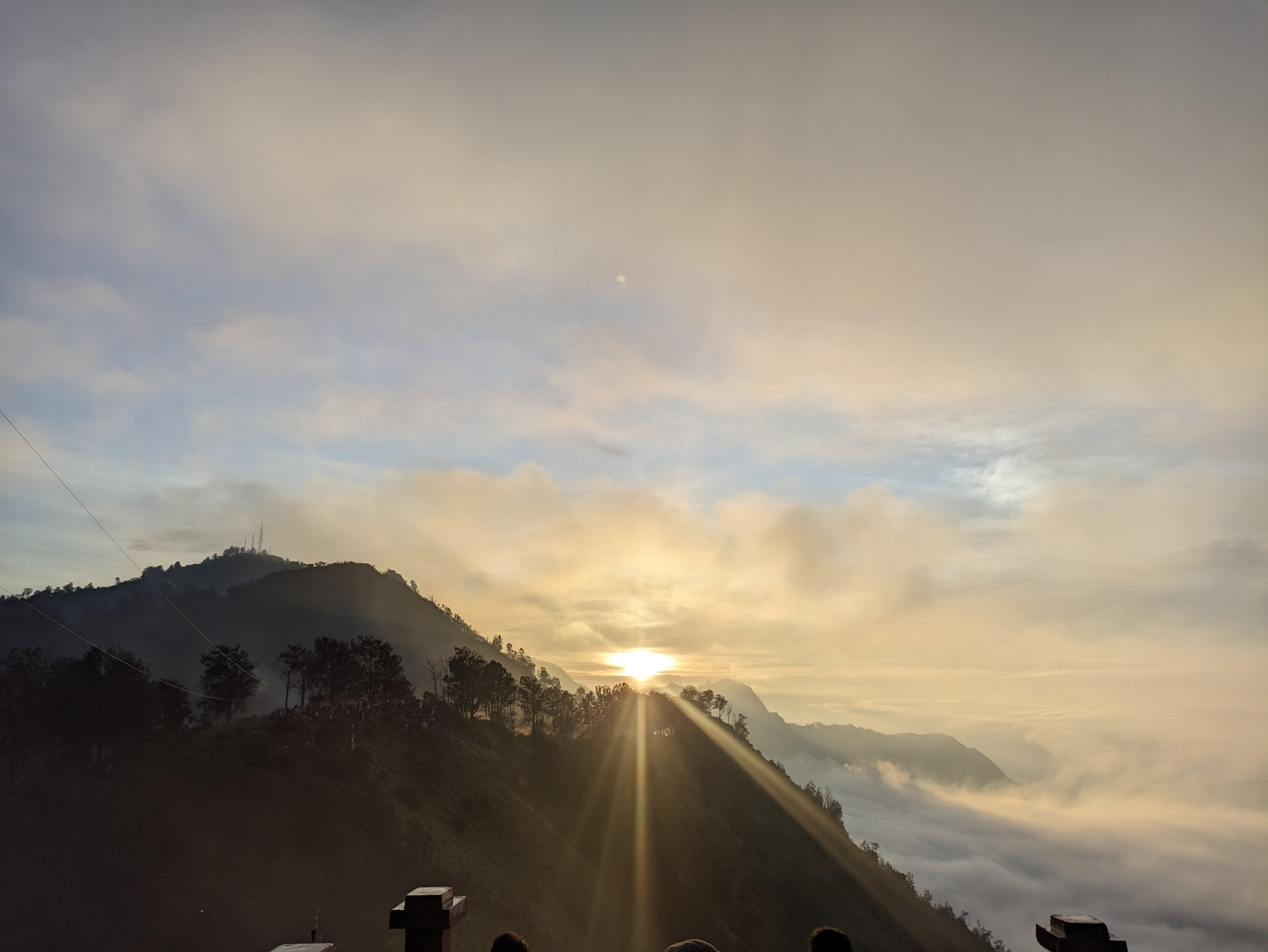
Sunrise over Mount Penanjakan, one of the mountains surrounding the massif

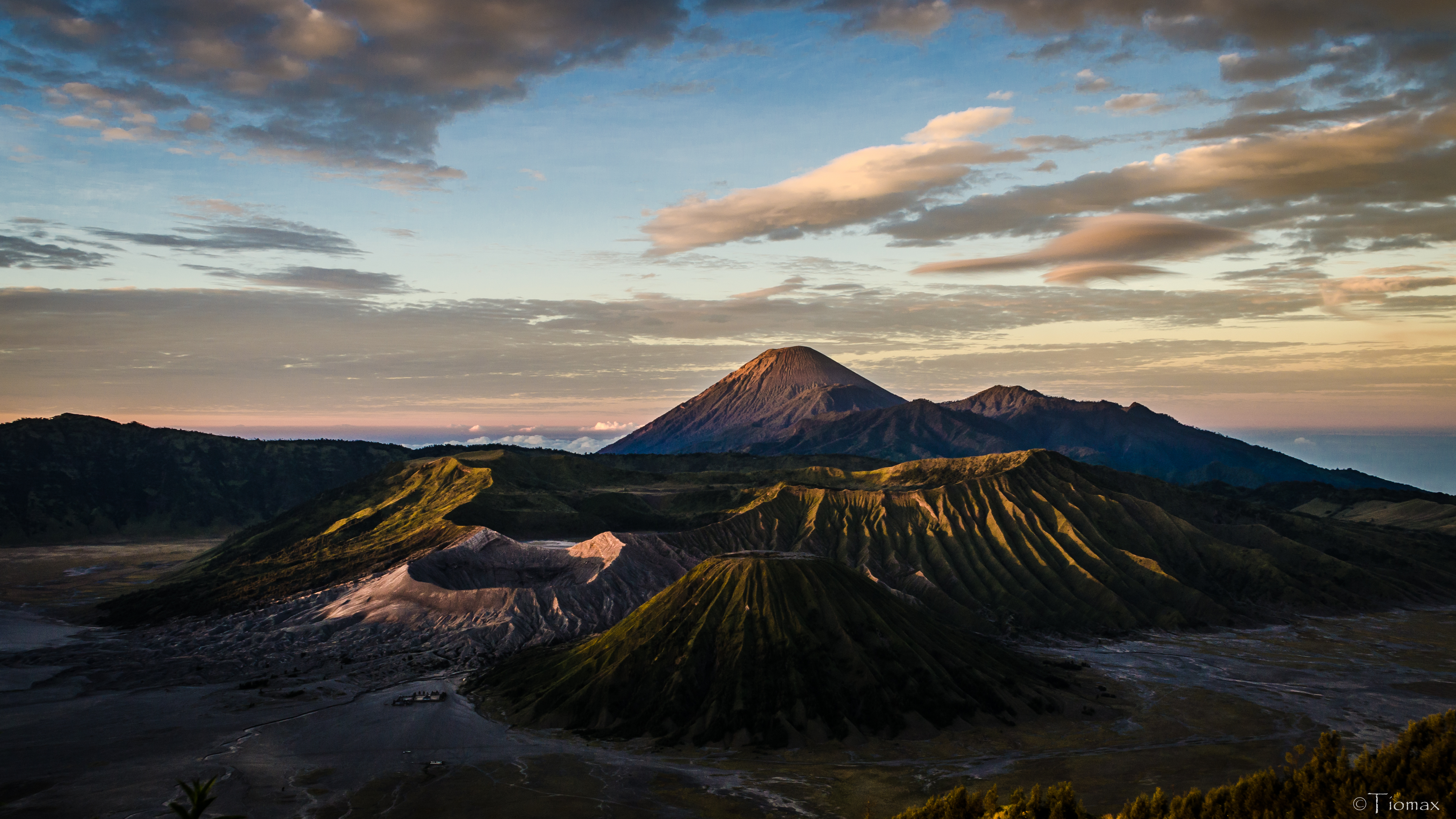
Sunrise over Tengger caldera on a clear day

== See also ==
- List of national parks of Indonesia
- Geography of Indonesia
- Yadnya Kasada
