= Yadnya Kasada =

Hindu ritual of the Tenggerese people

Yadnya Kasada Kesodo
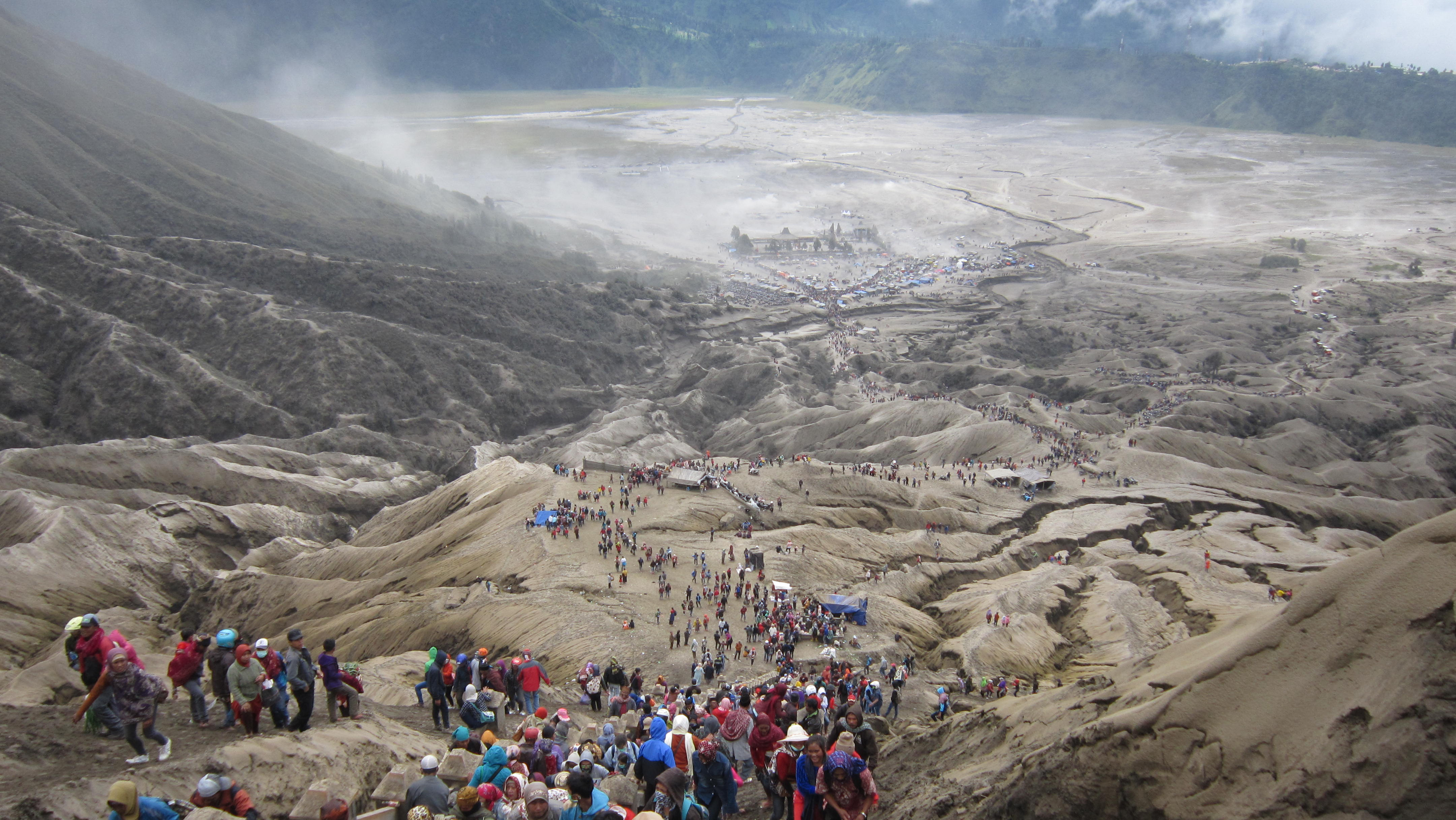
- Devotees climbing the trail towards Mount Bromo
- Genre: Religious festival
- Date: 14th day of the month of Kasada in the traditional Tengger calendar
- Frequency: Annually
- Locations: Probolinggo Regency, East Java
- Country: Indonesia

Yadnya Kasada, also known as Kesodo, is a traditional Hindu ritual of the Tenggerese people, an ethnic subgroup of the Javanese. The ritual serves as a way of expressing appreciation to their gods, whom they believe have granted them with blessings, abundance, and welfare.

The Tenggerese live in sixty villages around the Tengger mountains (Mount Bromo) in the Bromo Tengger Semeru National Park, comprising the regencies of Probolinggo, Lumajang, and Pasuruan, as well as the city of Malang, East Java, Indonesia.

Administratively, the festival location takes place in the Probolinggo Regency in East Java.

== History ==
The origin of this festival is a legend that dates back to the Majapahit kingdom, during the reign of King Brawijaya. At the fall of the Majapahit empire the princess of the kingdom and her husband Roro Anteng took refuge in the upper slopes of Mount Bromo. The couple and their followers later settled in the Tengger mountains and ruled the region jointly under the title Purbawisesa Mangkurat Ing Tengger. Under their leadership Tenngerese people settled and began to flourish, but the couple were not happy as they remained childless after many years of marriage. Therefore, they meditated atop Mount Bromo, beseeching the mountain gods for assistance. The gods granted them 24 children on the condition that the 25th child must be thrown into the volcano as human sacrifice. The gods’ request was observed, and so the tradition of offering sacrifices thrown into the volcano to appease the deities continues until today, but, of course, with no sacrifices of humans. Instead, today chickens, goats and vegetables are thrown into the crater as sacrifice.

According to another version of the legend the couple did not follow the promise. God becomes angry with threatening to inflict catastrophe, then there is a tempestuous circumstances into a pitch black crater of Mount Bromo sprayed fire. Their youngest son Kesuma vanished from the sight of the fire and into the crater of Bromo, along with Kesuma's disappearance came the unseen voice, "My dear friends, I have been sacrificed by our parents and Sang Hyang Widhi saved all of you.Live peace and serenity, worship the Sang Hyang Widhi, I remind you every month of Kasada on the 14th day to make offerings to Sang Hyang Widhi in the crater of Mount Bromo ".

== Pura Luhur Poten ==
Poten is a sacred area of land in the "Sea of Sand" (Javanese: Segara Wedhi or Indonesian: Lautan Pasir), which becomes place for Kasada festival. On the sand plain, locally called Segara Wedi (lit. sand ocean), sits a Hindu temple called Pura Luhur Poten. The temple organises the Yadnya Kasada ritual which lasts for about one month. On the 14th day, the Tenggerese congregate at Pura Luhur Poten to ask for blessings from Ida Sang Hyang Widi Wasa and the God of Mahameru (Mount Semeru). The temple consists of several buildings and enclosures arranged in a composition arrangement in the yard which is divided into three mandala (zone), Mandala Utama , Mandala Madya and Mandala Nista .

== Festival ==
Eksotika Bromo Festival is held as part Yadnya Kasada ritual that is organized by the regency administration to develop traditional culture and art activities in the community to help lure tourists to the region. It is held prior to the Yadnya Kasada ritual. Various type of traditional arts and cultural programs are presented to celebrate this festival. The festival attracts huge numbers of local as well as foreign tourists every year.

== Ritual ==
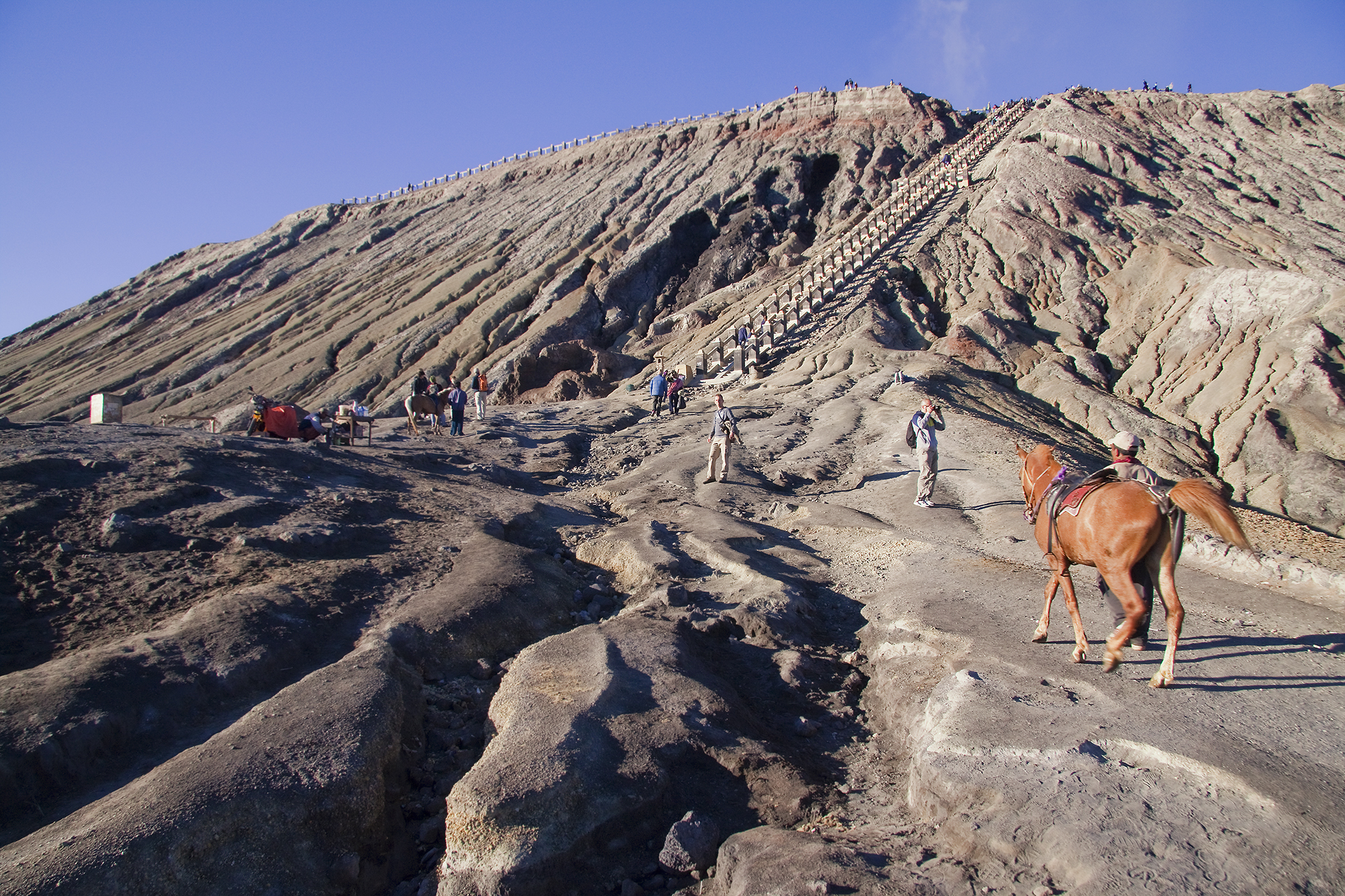
Trail leads to Mount Bromo

Yadnya Kasada is held every 14th day of the Kasada Month in the traditional Tengger calendar. This ceremony is held to honor Sang Hyang Widhi, God Almighty, and is based on the ancient legend of Roro Anteng and Joko Seger.

Pendopo Agung Desa Ngadisari (Ngadisari village Grand Hall) became the starting point of the Yadnya Kasada procession. Offerings began to be distributed to the Luhur Poten temple at the sand grounds which is known as Poten, right at the bottom of Mount Bromo. Following the ritual, the Tengger tribe shamans, local public figures, and Tenggerese people gather and pray for their safety and prosperity.

On the day of Yadnya Kasada, devotees who have journeyed up the mountain, pray together atop the mountain and then throw their offerings into the crater of the volcano. On the 14th day of the Kasada, the Tenggerese go to Poten Bromo and ask for blessing from the main deity Hyang Widi Wasa and Mahadeva, the God of the Mountain (Mount Semeru), by offerings sacrifices, which include vegetables, fruit, livestock, flowers as well as money, and are offered in grateful thanks for an abundance of agricultural produce and livestock given to them. Sometimes locals clamber down into the crater despite obvious dangers, to retrieve the sacrificed goods, which are believed to bring them good luck.

== See also ==
- Tenggerese people
- Malang
