= Arekan Javanese =

Arekan is a dialect of Javanese language spoken primarily in the regions of Surabaya, Malang and Lamongan.

== Classification ==
It belongs to the Austronesian language family, and is classified as a dialect of Javanese.

== Geographic distribution ==
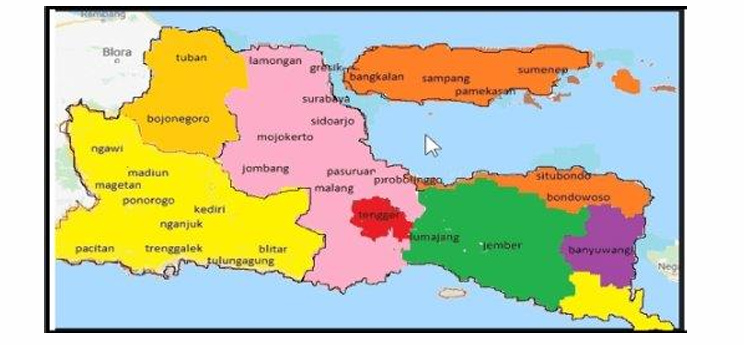
This is a map of dialects in East Java. Arekan is marked in pink.

It is spoken mainly in Surabaya, with speakers in Malang, Jombang, Pasuran, Mojokerto and Lamongan. It is spoken by approximately 82 million people.

== Differences from standard Javanese ==
Word	Meaning in Standard Javanese	Meaning in Arekan Javanese
Let	To recover from illness	Done
Sane	Not insane, recovering from [mental] illness	To recover from illness
Meh	Will	Almost

== See also ==
- Javanese language
