= Pasuruan Regency =

Regency in East Java, Indonesia

Pasuruan Regency Kabupaten Pasuruan
- Regency

Other transcription(s)
  - Javanese: Pasuruhan (Gêdrig) ڤاسوروهن (Pégon) ꦥꦱꦸꦫꦸꦃꦲꦤ꧀ (Hånåcåråkå)
  - Madurese: Pasuruwân (Latèn) ڤاسورووۤان (Pèghu) ꦦꦱꦸꦫꦸꦮꦤ꧀ (Carakan)
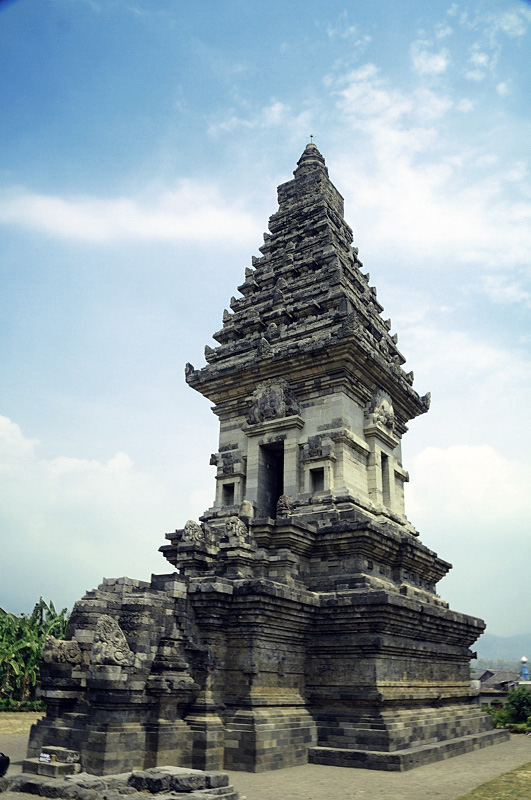
- Candi Jawi in Prigen

- Coat of arms
- Motto: Guna Karya Sarana Bhakti (Worthwhile works for the means of service)
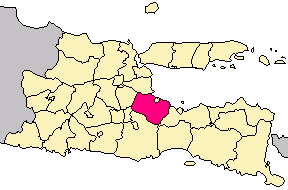
- Location within East Java

- Location in Java and Indonesia Pasuruan Regency (Indonesia)
- Coordinates: 7.73333°S 112.83333°E
- Country: Indonesia
- Province: East Java
- Capital city: Bangil

Government
  - Regent: Mochamad Rusdi Sutejo
  - Vice Regent: Shobih Asrori

Area
  - Total: 1,474.02 km^{2} (569.12 sq mi)

Population (mid 2025 estimate)
  - Total: 1,690,516
  - Density: 1,146.87/km^{2} (2,970.39/sq mi)
- Time zone: UTC+7 (IWST)
- Postal code: 67100
- Area code: (+62) 343
- Vehicle registration: N
- Website: pasuruankab.go.id

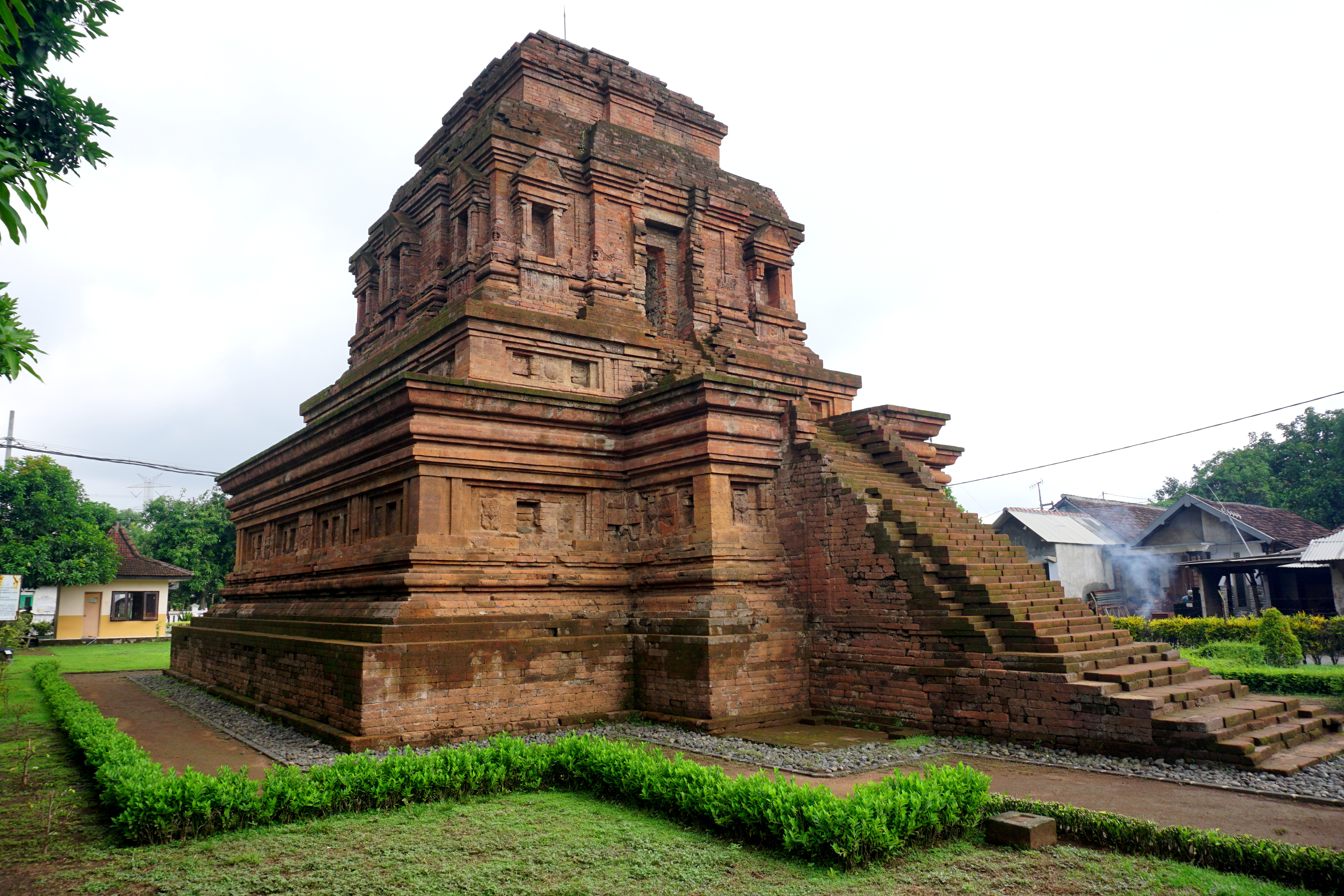
Gunung Gangsir Temple

Pasuruan Regency (Javanese: ꦏꦧꦸꦥꦠꦺꦤ꧀ꦥꦱꦸꦫꦸꦃꦲꦤ꧀) is a regency in East Java, a province of Indonesia. The capital of this regency is Bangil. The regency covers an area of 1,474.02 km^{2}, and it had a population of 1,512,468 at the 2010 Census and 1,605,969 at the 2020 Census; the official estimate as of mid 2025 was 1,690,516 (comprising 843,429 males and 847,077 females).

These figures exclude the population of Pasuruan city, which lies geographically within this regency (except on the north side, where it faces onto the Madura Strait) but is administratively separate from it. There are moves underway to make Bangil the new administrative center of Pasuruan Regency, with some offices being transferred from Pasuruan city to Bangil.

The Dutch spelling of the name of the regency and of the city was 'Pasoeroean'.

== Demographics ==
The regional languages used in Pasuruan Regency are mainly Javanese (Arekan or Eastern Javanese dialect), there is also Madurese (Pasuruan dialect), especially in the east, and Tenggerese around the Bromo Tengger Semeru National Park area. Indonesian serves as the official language and lingua franca.

== Administrative districts ==
Pasuruan Regency is divided into 24 districts (kecamatan), tabulated below with their areas and population totals from the 2010 Census and the 2020 Census, together with the official estimates as of mid 2025. For convenience of reference the districts are grouped into three geographical sectors which have no administrative significance, but serve to indicate the differing population densities in the south and the north of the regency, with the south having over 50% of the area but only 29% of the population of the regency. The table also includes the locations of the district administrative centres, the number of administrative villages in each district (totaling 341 rural desa and 24 urban kelurahan), and their postal codes.

Kode Wilayah	Name of District (kecamatan)	Area in km^{2}	Pop'n Census 2010	Pop'n Census 2020	Pop'n Estimate mid 2025	Admin centre	No. of villages	Post codes
35.14.01	Purwodadi ^{(a)}	102.46	65,363	70,015	73,660	Purwodadi	13	67163
35.14.02	Tutur	86.30	51,941	53,743	56,594	Wonosari	12	67165
35.14.03	Puspo	58.35	27,040	27,722	29,392	Puspo	7	67176
35.14.24	Tosari	98.00	18,478	18,799	19,167	Tosari	8	67177
35.14.04	Lumbang	125.55	32,856	35,174	37,106	Cukurguling	12	67183
35.14.05	Pasrepan	89.95	50,070	52,396	55,288	Pasrepan	17	67175
35.14.06	Kejayan	79.15	62,641	65,374	70,299	Kejayan	25 ^{(b)}	67172
35.14.07	Wonorejo	47.30	56,264	59,864	63,535	Wonorejo	15	67173
35.14.08	Purwosari	59.67	77,871	84,137	89,167	Purwosari	15 ^{(c)}	67162
Sub-totals for	Southern Sector	746.73	442,524	467,224	494,208		124	
35.14.10	Prigen	121.90	82,429	87,227	91,394	Prigen	14 ^{(d)}	67157
35.14.09	Sukorejo	58.18	81,060	87,477	91,910	Glagahsari	19	67161
35.14.11	Pandaan	43.27	105,326	111,062	115,837	Petungsari	18 ^{(e)}	67156
35.14.12	Gempol	64.92	123,084	129,990	134,480	Karangrejo	15	67155
35.14.13	Beji	39.90	78,269	87,022	92,982	Beji	14 ^{(f)}	67153
35.14.14	Bangil	44.60	84,438	83,307	86,381	Kolursari	15 ^{(g)}	67153
35.14.15	Rembang	42.52	60,576	66,711	72,436	Rembang	17	67152
Sub-totals for	Northwest Sector	414.99	615,182	652,796	685,420		112	
35.14.16	Kraton	50.75	89,128	88,525	92,029	Kraton	25	67151
35.14.17	Pohjentrek	11.88	28,308	31,296	32,225	Susukanrejo	9	67171
35.14.18	Gondang Wetan	26.25	50,612	56,264	59,342	Gondang Wetan	20 ^{(h)}	67174
35.14.23	Rejoso	37.00	43,779	46,766	49,728	Rejoso Lor	16	67181
35.14.19	Winongan	45.97	41,206	44,287	46,868	Winongan Lor	18	67182
35.14.20	Grati	50.78	70,963	78,930	83,271	Gratitunon	15 ^{(i)}	67184
25.14.22	Lekok	46.57	70,531	77,514	81,966	Tambaklekok	11	67186
35.14.21	Nguling	42.60	54,957	62,367	65,459	Nguling	15	67185
Sub-totals for	Northeast Sector	311.80	469,484	485,949	510,888		129	
Totals for	Regency	1,474.02	1,512,468	1,605,969	1,690,516	Bangil	365	

Notes: (a) within Malang Metropolitan area. (b) including one kelurahan (Kejayan). (c) including one kelurahan (Purwosari). (d) including 3 kelurahan (Ledug, Pecalukan and Prigen).
(e) including 5 kelurahan (Banjarsari, Jogosari, Kutorejo, Pandaan and Petungasri). (f) including 2 kelurahan (Glanggang and Pagak).
(g) comprising 11 kelurahan (Bendo Mungal, Dermo, Gempeng, Kalianyar, Kalirejo, Kauman, Kersikan, Kidul Dalem, Kolursari, Latek and Pogar) and 4 desa.
(h) including one kelurahan (Gondang Wetan). (i) including one kelurahan (Gratitunon).
