= Gesang (village) =

- Village
- Motto(s): Tri Samapta: Nglayani, Ngayomi, Ngayemi
- Interactive map of Gesang
- Country: Indonesia
- Province: East Java
- Regency: Lumajang
- District: Tempeh

Government
  - Head of Village: A. Baidowi Ridwan

Area
  - Total: 6.41 km^{2} (2.47 sq mi)

Population (2008)
  - Total: 5,591
  - Density: 872/km^{2} (2,260/sq mi)
- Time zone: UTC+7 (WIB)
- Website: www.desa-gesang.com

Gesang (also Desa Gesang) is a village in the Tempeh district of Lumajang Regency, East Java, Indonesia. It lies about 30 minutes by road from Lumajang and four hours from Surabaya. It borders Jokarto to the north, Pulo to the east, Jatisari to the south east, Semumu to the south and Nguter to the west.

== Demography ==
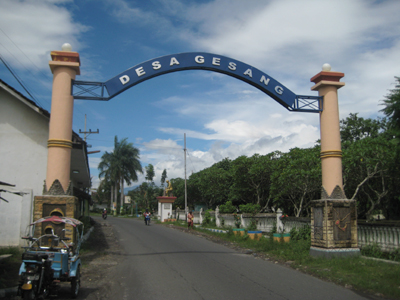
Entry archway to Gesang Village

According to a 2008 census, Gesang had a population of 5,591, comprising 2,800 males and 2,791 females. The village is divided into five dusun (hamlets): Putuk, Kebonan (formerly Kebon Sari), Darungan, Krajan I and Krajan II. It comprises five rukun warga (RW) and 42 rukun tetangga (RT).

Most of the population is Muslim, with a small Christian minority; there is a church in the village.

== History ==
According to local tradition, in the 13th century a group from the Mataram kingdom settled on Nusa Barong island, off Puger, under the leadership of Patih Danurejo, having been sent to recover a royal heirloom said to have been taken by Ratu Pantai Selatan (the Queen of the Southern Ocean). When the king of Blambangan learned that they were within his territory, he ordered them to leave the island. The remaining warriors are said to have fled to the valley of Mount Semeru, in what is now Tumpeng village, where an elder called Mbah Tuan advised them to make a kauripan (livelihood) for themselves to the east of Tumpeng. They settled at Watu Dakon, now Dusun Krajan I.

In 1924, under Dutch colonial rule, Taman Wirorejo became the first kepala desa (village head) of Gesang. He also changed the name of the village to Gesang, from the word pagesangan, with a meaning similar to kauripan (life).

=== Village heads ===
1. Taman Wirorejo, 1924–1939
2. Danurejo, 1940–1945
3. Amaru, 1946–1949
4. Surahmad Wd, 1950–1966
5. Buwang, 1967–1968
6. Surahmad, 1969–1992
7. Sukamtono, 1992–1997
8. Bambang Bigyanto, 1997–2002
9. Sukamtono, 2000–2007
10. A. Baidowi Ridwan, from 2007

== Education ==
The village has two Sekolah Dasar (SD), or primary schools, for children aged about 5 to 11. SD Negeri 1 Gesang is on the village's main road, Jalan Raya Gesang, while SD Negeri 2 Gesang is behind the Balai Desa, or village hall.

Students attending junior, senior and vocational secondary school, known respectively as Sekolah Menengah Pertama (SMP), Sekolah Menengah Atas (SMA) and Sekolah Menengah Kejuruan (SMK), travel to the neighbouring villages of Pulo and Tempeh, or to one of the two SMA in Lumajang. A kindergarten, Taman Kanak-Kanak (TK), adjoins SD Negeri 2 Gesang.

A Sekolah Luar Biasa (SLB), a school for children with disabilities, is located on Jalan Sutono. It was renovated as part of the Australia Indonesia Youth Exchange Program. The school takes students with a range of disabilities.

== Health ==
Gesang has a Puskesmas (Pusat Kesehatan Masyarakat, community health centre) in the centre of the village, staffed by a doctor, a dentist, a nurse and a midwife, with a pharmacy on site. Its programmes include clinics focused on the health of women and children, covering nutrition, physical health, child development and sanitation, as well as mosquito surveillance intended to reduce the incidence of dengue fever in the area. Sporting activities in the village include football, volleyball, and aerobics.

== Economy ==
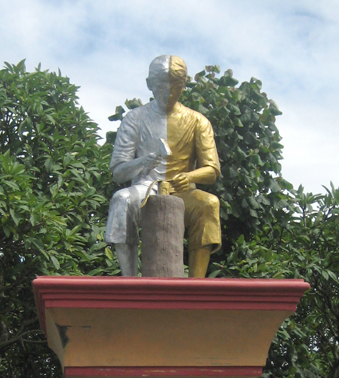
Silver and gold craftsman statue in Gesang

Most of the population works in farming, largely at subsistence level. The main crops are rice, corn, beans and legumes, sugar and cassava. A number of residents are employed in the local jewellery industry, which produces handmade gold and silver jewellery, much of it sold to tourists in Bali. Sales were affected by the 2002 and 2005 Bali bombings and by the global financial crisis of 2007–2009.
