= Ranu Pani =

Lake in Indonesia

Lake Pani
- Ranu Pani (Javanese); Danau Pani (Indonesian)
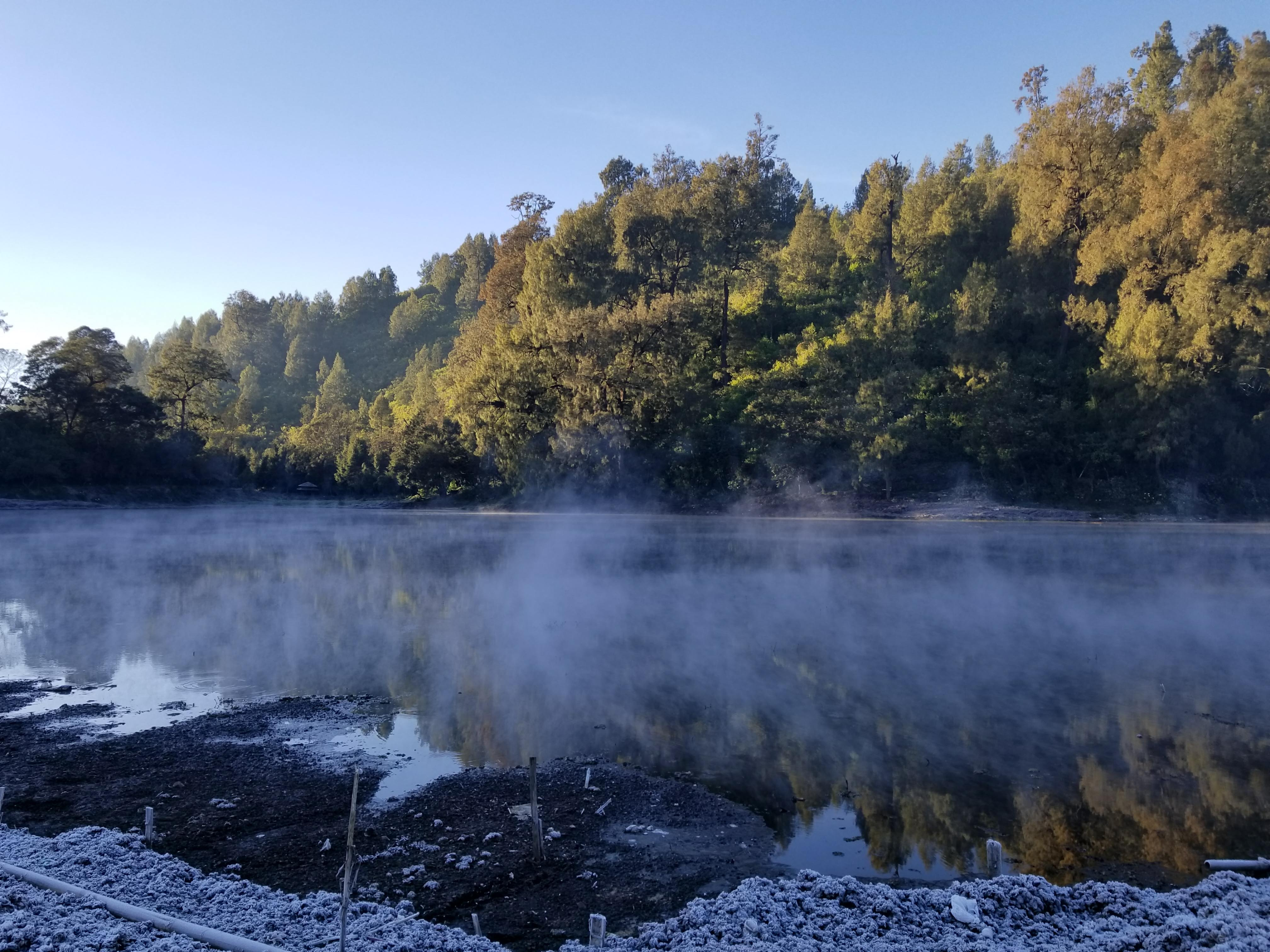
- Light Snow of Ranu Pani

- Location within Java
- Location: Bromo Tengger Semeru National Park, East Java
- Coordinates: 8°00′43″S 112°56′49″E
- Type: Volcanic
- Primary inflows: Precipitation only
- Basin countries: Indonesia
- Surface area: 0.75 ha (1.9 acres)
- Average depth: 7 m (23 ft)
- Surface elevation: 2,114 m (6,900 ft)

Ranu Pani or Ranupani is a volcanic lake in Ranu Pani Village, Senduro District, Lumajang Regency, East Java. Ranu Pani is part of the Bromo Tengger Semeru National Park (TNBTS). Initially, the area of Ranu Pani was around one hectare, but now it is estimated to be only 0.75 hectares due to the rapid sedimentation rate. The population of Ranu Pani is around 2,000 people.

== History ==
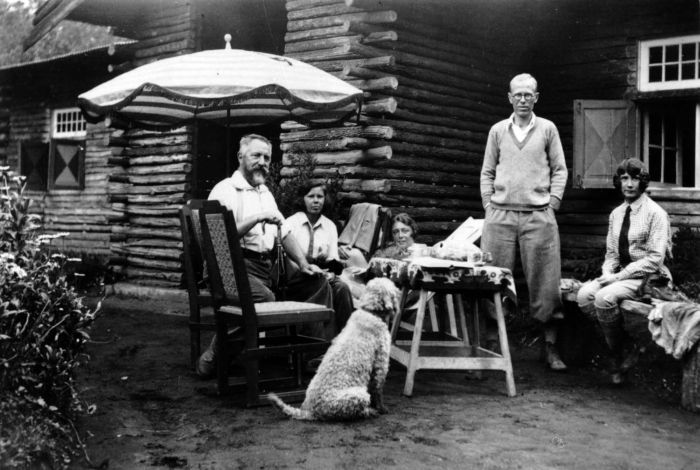
Dutch farmer family in Ranupani, 1933.

In the beginning, one of the Dutch families present in Java during the colonial period managed the land that includes the area where Ranu Pani is now located. The management of land in Java by European families was very common at that time; the management of part of the land in the Iyang-Argopuro Plateau by the Ledeboer family in 1916 was no exception. The Indonesian independence on 17 August 1945 caused the exodus of the Dutch from various parts of the country, with control of many assets assumed by the Republican government of Indonesia. Since that time, many immigrants from various regions (especially Senduro, Singosari, Malang, Ngadas) have come to live in the village. At present, Ranupani Village has two hamlets, namely Gedokasu (Sidodadi) and Besaran, and is one of the enclave villages within the Bromo Tengger Semeru National Park (TNBTS) area. The residential area of Ranupani is surrounded by a stretch of agricultural land, which includes, among other things, Scales in the North, Amprong in the West, Rondo Kuning in the East, Suropotong in the Northeast, Reserves in the South and Dempok in the Southwest. Daerah Besaran consists of 3 Rukun Tetangga, while the GedokAsu area consists of 4 Neighborhood Groups. In 1999, Desa Ranupani was separated from the main village of Argosari with a definitive village preparation status by the Government of Lumajang Regency.

== Geography ==
=== Climate ===
In Ranu Pani, the climate is warm and temperate. During summer, which extends from November to March, large rainfall amounts are recorded. Winter, from June to September, is relatively dry, with temperatures often below zero degrees Celsius at night. Frost is frequent but light snow is rarely observed. According to Köppen and Geiger, this climate is classified as subtropical highland variety (Cwb). The temperature average is 13.1 °C and the annual rainfall is 1918 mm.

Climate data for Ranu Pani, Bromo Tengger Semeru National Park (elevation 2,114 meters or 6,936 feet)
Month	Jan	Feb	Mar	Apr	May	Jun	Jul	Aug	Sep	Oct	Nov	Dec	Year
Mean daily maximum °C (°F)	17.2 (63.0)	17.4 (63.3)	17.6 (63.7)	17.4 (63.3)	17.3 (63.1)	16.9 (62.4)	16.3 (61.3)	16.5 (61.7)	16.9 (62.4)	17.6 (63.7)	17.4 (63.3)	17.3 (63.1)	17.2 (62.9)
Daily mean °C (°F)	13.5 (56.3)	13.6 (56.5)	13.9 (57.0)	13.5 (56.3)	13.2 (55.8)	12.7 (54.9)	11.8 (53.2)	11.9 (53.4)	12.3 (54.1)	13.3 (55.9)	13.8 (56.8)	13.6 (56.5)	13.1 (55.6)
Mean daily minimum °C (°F)	9.9 (49.8)	9.8 (49.6)	10.3 (50.5)	9.7 (49.5)	9.2 (48.6)	8.5 (47.3)	7.3 (45.1)	7.4 (45.3)	7.8 (46.0)	9 (48)	10.2 (50.4)	9.9 (49.8)	9.1 (48.3)
Average precipitation mm (inches)	290 (11.4)	330 (13.0)	346 (13.6)	183 (7.2)	105 (4.1)	63 (2.5)	36 (1.4)	14 (0.6)	19 (0.7)	72 (2.8)	143 (5.6)	317 (12.5)	1,918 (75.4)
Source: Climate-Data.org (temp & precip)

== Tourism ==
Ranu Pani is a legal start and easiest route point for hikers to Mount Semeru. Ranu Pani is the last village before hiking to Mount Semeru. The village is inhabited by residents of the Tengger tribe and is located at an altitude of 2,100 meters above sea level. Annually, residents in the village always hold clean village and unan-unan rituals led by traditional shamans. The villagers of Ranu Pani the Tengger Tribe, are native descendants of Javanese people who lived in the era of the Majapahit Empire. Some villagers work as climbing guides for Mount Semeru otherwise known as porters. Porter provides goods carrier services as well as an introduction to climbers to the top of the mountain. This porter profession is often also a hereditary job. All porters of Mount Semeru are joined and coordinated in a community. Climbers who will go to Mount Semeru will pass through two lakes around Ranu Pani, namely Ranu Regulo located in the villages of Ranu Pani, and Ranu Kumbolo which is located on the upper slope about 5 hours hike from Ranu Pani.

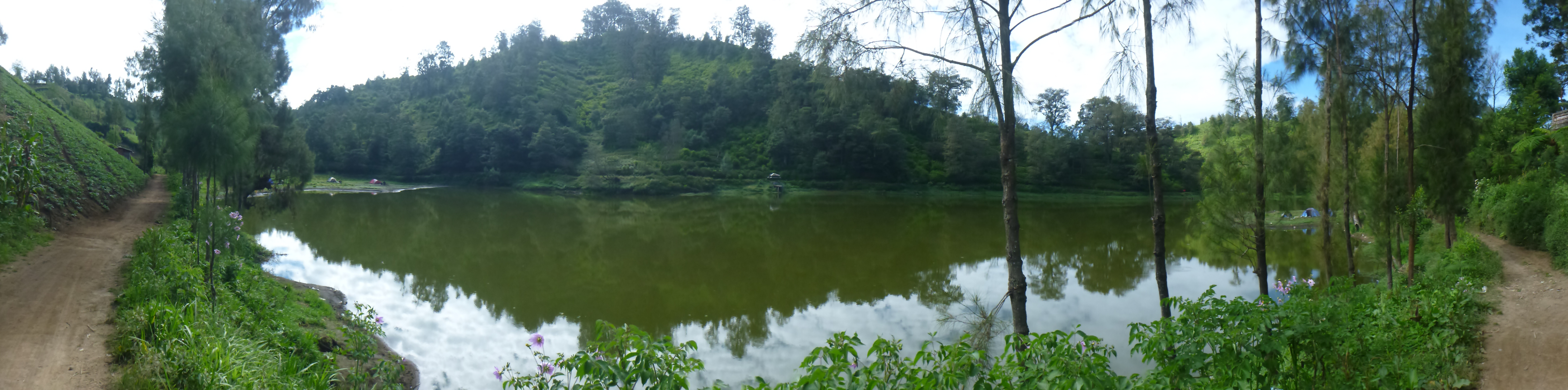
Panorama of Ranu Pani.

== Conservation ==
Agricultural activities are considered as one of the broader narrowing factors of Ranu Pani, the opening of hills as agricultural land causes erosion. The function of large trees to resist soil erosion cannot be replaced by agricultural crops. In addition, the large number of climbers and visitors who throw litter, resulting in the accumulation of various types of waste and resulting in decreasing the depth of the lake. Even a few times hikers often burn their trash. Previously in 1998, the depth of Lake Ranu Pani reached 12 meters, in 2013 the lake became increasingly shallow in the middle of the lake, reaching only 7 meters deep. Efforts to clean wild plants around Ranu Pani are considered ineffective, so an environmental improvement program is carried out around the lake and planting a living fence on the lake's borders with settlements to reduce sedimentation and the entry of garbage into the lake. Since 2010, TNBTS has collaborated with the University of Brawijaya and the Japan International Cooperation Agency (JICA) to try to restore the function of the lake as before.

== See also ==
- Ranu Kumbolo
- Mount Semeru
- Bromo Tengger Semeru National Park
- List of lakes of Indonesia
