= Sumbermujur =

- Location in East Java and Indonesia Sumbermujur (Indonesia)
- Coordinates: 8°7′10.8588″S 112°57′31.3596″E
- Country: Indonesia
- Province: East Java
- Regency: Lumajang Regency
- District: Candipuro District
- Elevation: 4,849 ft (1,478 m)

Population (2010)
  - Total: 6,332
- Time zone: UTC+7 (Western Indonesia Time)

Sumbermujur (Indonesian pronunciation: [sʊmbərˈmud͡ʒʊr]) is a village in Candipuro District, Lumajang Regency in East Java Province. Its population is 6332.

== Climate ==
Sumbermujur has a subtropical highland climate (Cfb). It has moderate rainfall from June to September and heavy to very heavy rainfall in the remaining months.

Climate data for Sumbermujur
Month	Jan	Feb	Mar	Apr	May	Jun	Jul	Aug	Sep	Oct	Nov	Dec	Year
Mean daily maximum °C (°F)	22.3 (72.1)	22.5 (72.5)	22.4 (72.3)	22.3 (72.1)	22.3 (72.1)	21.8 (71.2)	21.3 (70.3)	21.6 (70.9)	22.4 (72.3)	23.0 (73.4)	22.4 (72.3)	22.3 (72.1)	22.2 (72.0)
Daily mean °C (°F)	18.4 (65.1)	18.5 (65.3)	18.5 (65.3)	18.1 (64.6)	17.9 (64.2)	17.2 (63.0)	16.3 (61.3)	16.5 (61.7)	17.3 (63.1)	18.1 (64.6)	18.1 (64.6)	18.3 (64.9)	17.8 (64.0)
Mean daily minimum °C (°F)	14.5 (58.1)	14.5 (58.1)	14.6 (58.3)	14.0 (57.2)	13.5 (56.3)	12.6 (54.7)	11.4 (52.5)	11.5 (52.7)	12.2 (54.0)	13.2 (55.8)	14.2 (57.6)	14.3 (57.7)	13.4 (56.1)
Average precipitation mm (inches)	403 (15.9)	347 (13.7)	382 (15.0)	232 (9.1)	189 (7.4)	99 (3.9)	72 (2.8)	48 (1.9)	62 (2.4)	156 (6.1)	293 (11.5)	410 (16.1)	2,693 (105.8)
Source: Climate-Data.org
