= Tumpak Sewu Waterfall =

- Coban Sewu
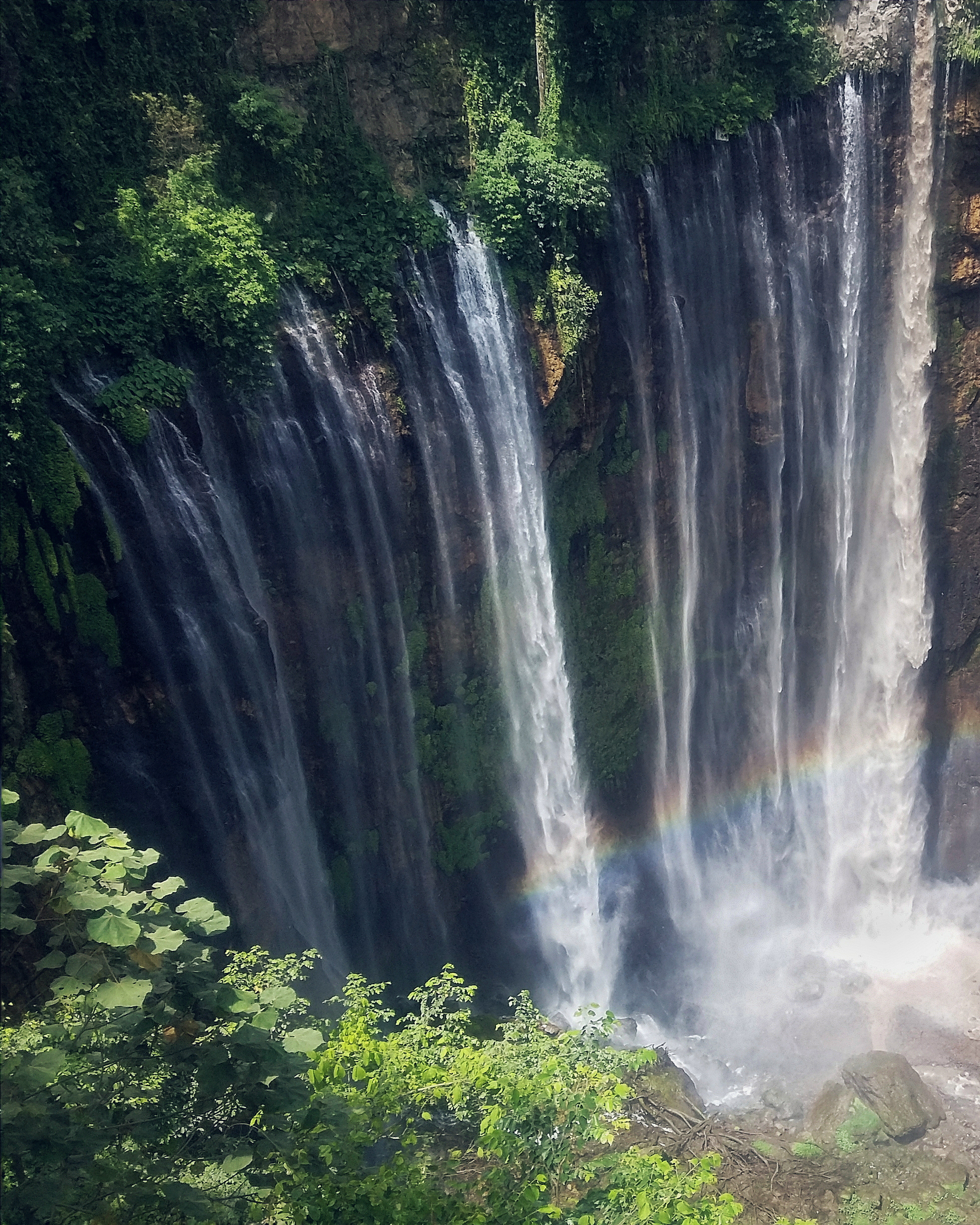

- Location within Indonesia
- Location: Sidomulyo, Pronojiwo, Lumajang, East Java Indonesia
- Coordinates: 8°13′49″S 112°55′01″E
- Type: Tiered
- Total height: 120 metres (390 ft)
- Watercourse: Glidih River

Tumpak Sewu, also known as Coban Sewu, is a tiered waterfall that is located between the Pronojiwo District, Lumajang Regency, and the Ampelgading District, Malang Regency, in East Java, Indonesia. The waterfall is overshadowed by Semeru, an active volcano and the highest mountain in Java. The Glidik River, which flows down Semeru, is the primary water source for the waterfall. Tumpak Sewu is loosely translated as "a thousand waterfalls" in Javanese. The name likely originated from the appearance of many different waterfalls in a single, semi-circular area.

Tumpak Sewu is a highly visited tourist destination, primarily on the weekends. Infrastructure built around and within the main box canyon has made access easier, though the trip to enter or exit is still physically demanding and may take about an hour.

== See also ==
- List of waterfalls
