= Mount Batok =

Volcano in East Java, Indonesia

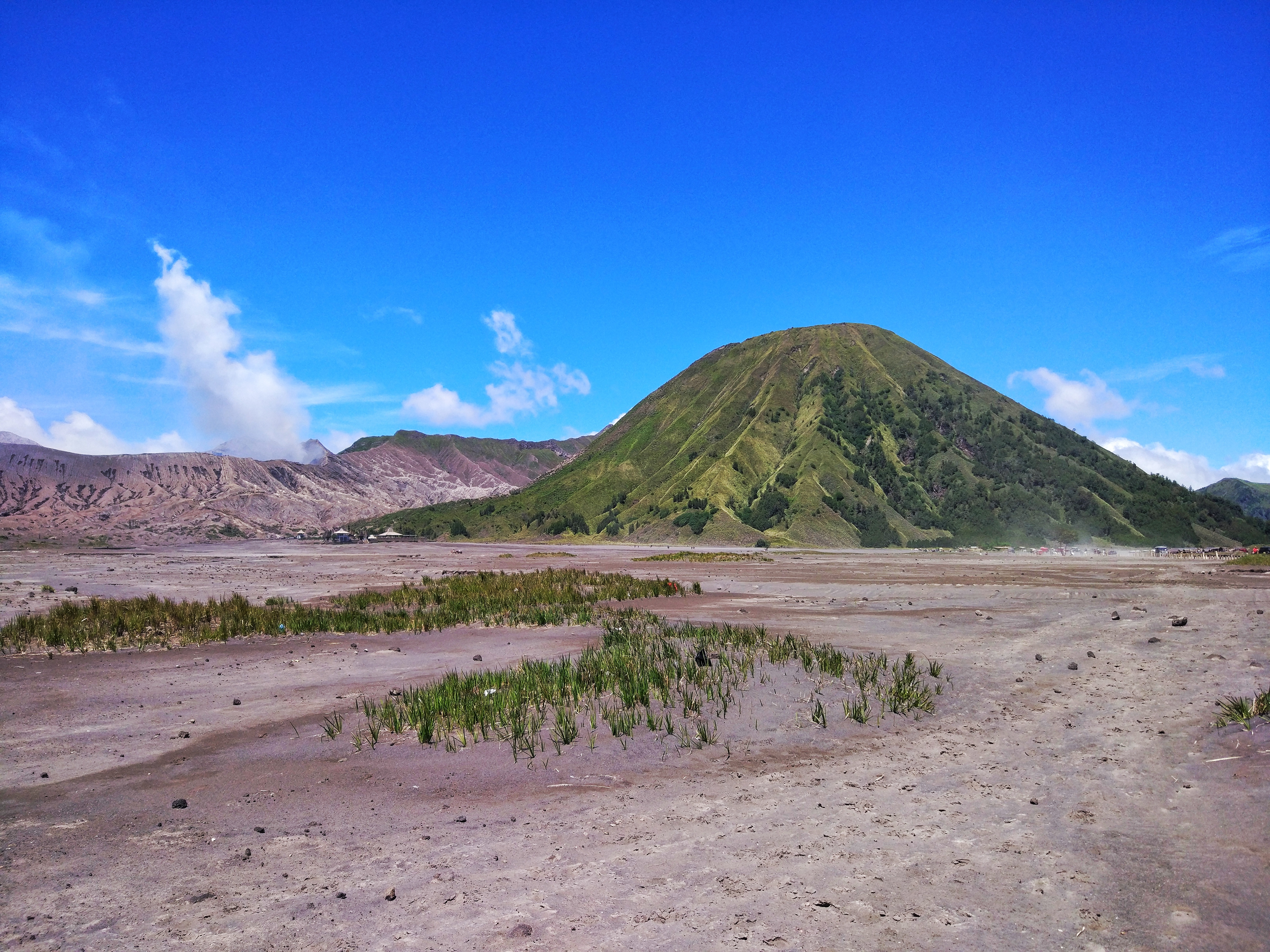
- View of Mount Batok and Bromo crater from Tengger sandsea

Highest point
- Elevation: 2,440 m (8,005 ft)
- Prominence: 340 m (1,115 ft)
- Listing: Spesial Ribu
- Coordinates: 7°56′05.2″S 112°56′50.4″E

Naming
- Etymology: Coconut Shell (in Javanese)

Geography
- Location within Java
- Location: East Java, Indonesia

Geology
- Mountain type: Cinder cone
- Volcanic arc: Sunda Arc

Mount Batok is a cinder cone located in East Java, Indonesia. This volcano has an elevation of 2,440 metres (8,005 ft) above sea level, and is located between four regencies: Probolinggo Regency, Pasuruan Regency, Lumajang Regency, and Malang Regency. The location of Mount Batok is west from Mount Bromo. This mountain is one of the inactive volcanoes located within the Tengger caldera. Mount Batok is part of Bromo Tengger Semeru National Park.

Mount Batok is often misidentified as the nearby Mount Bromo due to its prominence in the caldera, and its position in front of the more flat Bromo crater as viewed from their most popular viewpoints along the northern rim.

== Etymology ==
In Javanese, batok means "coconut shell". The Tenggerese people believe that Mount Batok was formed from a coconut shell which was kicked by Resi Bima, a powerful giant, after failing to fulfill the conditions proposed by Rara Anteng to marry her.

== See also ==
- Mount Bromo
- Bromo Tengger Semeru National Park
- Volcanology of Java
- List of volcanoes in Indonesia
