= Thoriqul Haq =

Indonesian politician

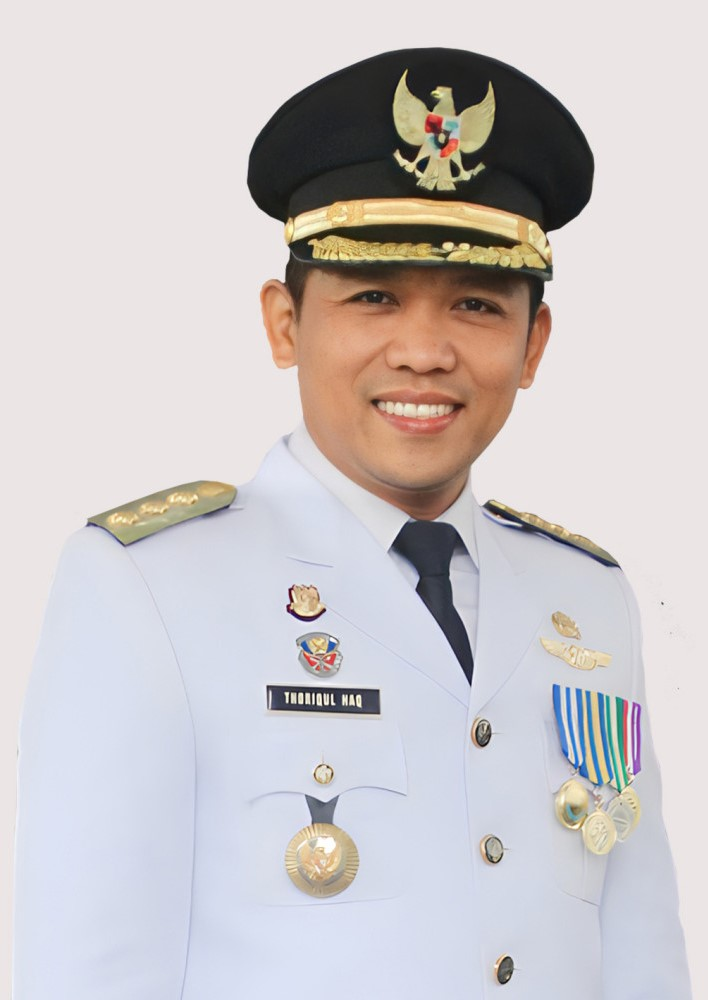

Regent of Lumajang
- In office 24 September 2018 – 24 September 2023
- Preceded by: As'at Malik
- Succeeded by: Indah Wahyuni (acting)

Member of East Java Regional House of Representatives
- In office 31 August 2009 – 2018
- Constituency: Lumajang and Jember

Personal details
- Born: 14 December 1977 (age 47); Lumajang, East Java, Indonesia
- Political party: National Awakening Party

Thoriqul Haq (born 14 December 1977) is an Indonesian politician of the National Awakening Party who served as the regent of Lumajang Regency, East Java, from 2018 to 2023. He had previously represented the regency along with Jember in the East Java Regional House of Representatives from 2009 to 2018.

== Early life ==
Thoriqul was born in the village of Sukosari, in Kunir district, Lumajang Regency, on 14 December 1977. He was educated in pesantren and in Islamic schools in East Java, and graduated from a state-run Islamic school in Malang in 1996, moving to Surabaya for undergraduate studies at IAIN Sunan Ampel in Surabaya. He would later receive a master's degree in linguistics from Universitas Airlangga and the University of Malaya and a doctorate from Brawijaya University.

== Career ==
Running as a National Awakening Party (PKB) candidate in the 2009 legislative election, Thoriqul was elected as a member of the East Java Regional House of Representatives after winning 32,194 votes, and was sworn in on 31 August 2009. He was reelected to a second term in 2014 to represent Lumajang and Jember, winning 84,145 votes. In the 2018 regency election, Thoriqul ran for the regency of Lumajang with Indah Amperawati Masdar as his running mate. The pair was supported by PKB and Gerindra, and defeated the incumbent regent As'at Malik in a three-way race after winning 247,555 votes (42.65%) to Malik's 201,324 (34.69%). The pair was sworn in as regent on 24 September 2018.

During the COVID-19 pandemic in Indonesia and subsequent lockdowns, Thoriqul and his deputy donated their salaries to constituents impacted by the lockdowns. He was infected with COVID-19 and was hospitalized. In 2023, responding to a local village's rejection of a church construction, Thoriqul earmarked Rp 1.5 billion (USD 100,000) in municipal funds to build a church and a musalla next to each other on municipal land. The houses of worship were transferred to the Pentecostal Church in Indonesia and to the local Nahdlatul Ulama branch respectively in December 2023. Thoriqul's five-year term expired on 24 September 2023, and head of the East Java government human resources unit Indah Wahyuni was appointed to replace him as acting regent. He then was appointed by his party PKB to lead the party's efforts in Anies Baswedan's 2024 presidential campaign in East Java.

== Family ==
Thoriqul married to Musfarina, a fellow alumni of Sunan Ampel, in 2006. The couple has three children as of 2022.
