= Mount Bromo =

Somma volcano in Indonesia

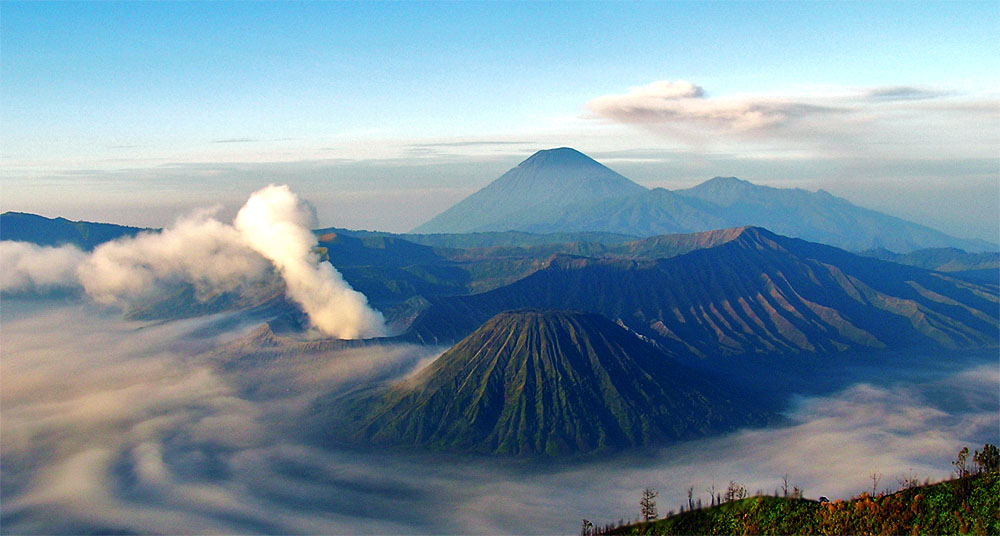
- View of Mts. Bromo (left and smoking), Batok (foreground), Semeru (center background), Jambangan (right background), and Widodaren (right foreground), in the Tengger Caldera

Highest point
- Elevation: 2,329 m (7,641 ft)
- Listing: Spesial Ribu
- Coordinates: 7°56′30″S 112°57′00″E

Geography
- Location within Java Location within Indonesia
- Location: Java, Indonesia
- Headwaters of river basins: Rejoso, Lawean, Sepaser, Tempuran, Bondoyudo, Mujur, & Brantas basin

Geology
- Mountain type: Somma volcano
- Volcanic arc: Sunda Arc
- Last eruption: November 5, 2026

Mount Bromo timelapse

The Bromo (Javanese: ꦧꦿꦩ), or Mount Bromo (Javanese: ꦒꦸꦤꦸꦁꦧꦿꦩ, Indonesian: Gunung Bromo), is an active somma volcano, a Hindu pilgrimage site, and part of the Tengger mountains, in East Java, Indonesia. At 2,329 meters (7,641 ft), it is not the highest peak of the massif, but is the most active and famous. The area is one of the most visited tourist destinations in East Java, and the volcano is included in the Bromo Tengger Semeru National Park. The name Bromo comes from the Javanese pronunciation of Brahma, the Hindu god of creation. At the mouth of the crater, there is an idol of Ganesha, the Hindu god of wisdom, which is worshipped by Javanese Hindus. Mount Bromo is located in the middle of a plain called "Sea of Sand" (Javanese: Segara Wedi or Indonesian: Lautan Pasir), a nature reserve that has been protected since 1919.

A typical way to visit Mount Bromo is from the nearby mountain village of Cemoro Lawang. From there, it is possible to walk to the volcano in about 45 minutes, but it is also possible to take an organized jeep tour, including stops at the viewpoint of Mount Penanjakan (2,770 m (9,090 ft)) (Indonesian: Gunung Penanjakan). The sights on Mount Penanjakan can also be reached by foot in about two hours. Depending on the level of volcanic activity, the Indonesian Center for Volcanology and Disaster Mitigation sometimes issues a warning not to visit Mount Bromo.

The neighboring Mount Batok is often mistaken as Mount Bromo due to its prominence in the caldera, and its position in front of the more flat Bromo crater as viewed from their most popular viewpoints along the northern rim.

== History of volcanic activity ==
=== 2004 eruptions ===
Mount Bromo erupted in 2004. That eruptive episode led to the death of two people who had been hit by rocks from the explosion.

=== 2010 eruptions ===
On 23 November 2010, 16.30 WIB (Western Indonesian Time), the Indonesian Centre of Volcanology and Geology Hazard Mitigation (CVGHM) confirmed the activity status of Mount Bromo at "alert" due to increasing tremor activity and shallow volcanic earthquakes at the mountain. Concerns were raised that a volcanic eruption might be likely to occur. As a precaution, local residents and tourists were instructed to remain clear of an area within a radius of three kilometers from the caldera and refugee encampments were erected. The area surrounding the Tengger caldera of Bromo remained off-limits for visitors throughout the remainder of 2010.

Bromo started to violently erupt on 26 November 2010.

On 29 November 2010, Directorate General of Civil Aviation spokesman Bambang Ervan announced that Abdul Rachman Saleh Airport in Malang would be closed until 4 December 2010. Government volcanologist Surono reported that the volcano was spitting columns of ash some 700 meters (2,300 feet) into the sky.

=== 2011 eruptions ===
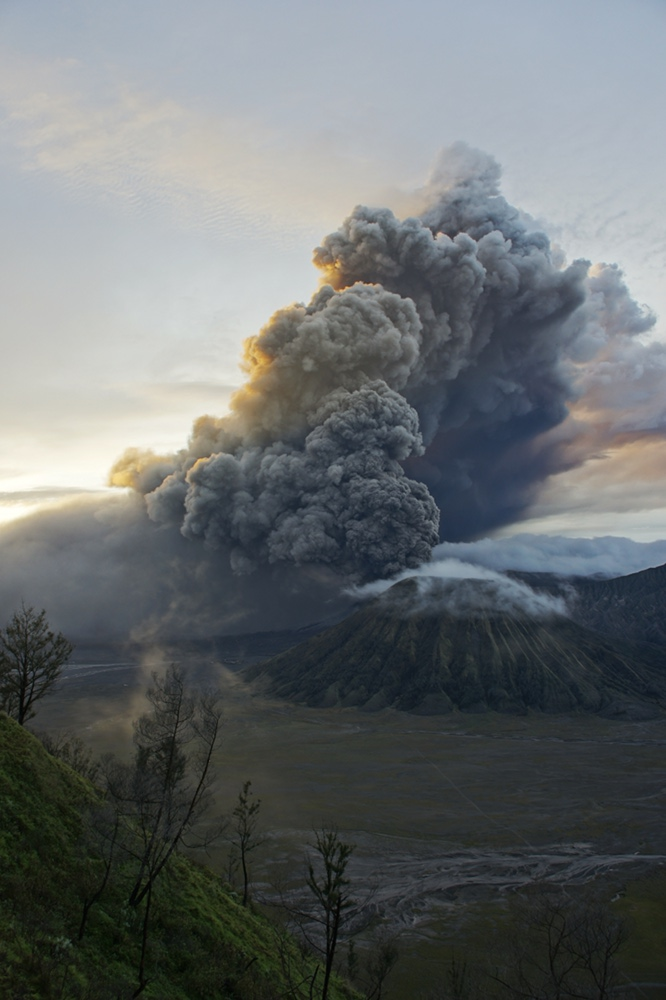
Bromo eruption January 22, 2011 at 5:30 am (Bromo volcano crater itself is not visible)

The Tengger Caldera was still active in late January 2011, the activity being characterised by fluctuating ongoing eruptions. On 23 January 2011, the CVGHM reported that since 19 December 2010 volcanic ash and incandescent material had been thrown up by eruptive activity resulting in a heavy rain of material that fell around the crater. Continuous eruptions on 21 January caused a thin ash fall mainly in the village areas of Ngadirejo and Sukapura Wonokerto in Probolinggo Regency.

The impact of a heavy rain of volcanic ash from eruptions since 19 December 2010 resulted in disruption of normal activities. By early 2011, concerns were being raised about the effect upon the local economy and the potential for long-term environmental and health problems amongst the residents in the locality surrounding Mount Bromo. Due to high seasonal rainfall in January 2011 the potential for lahar and lava flow was raised due to the deposits of volcanic ash, sand and other ejected material that had built up. Seismic activity was dominated by tremor vibration and reports of visual intensity and sounds of eruption continued to be reported from the mountain monitoring facility, Bromo Observation Post. People living on the banks of the Perahu Ravine, Nganten Ravine and Sukapura River were alerted to the possibility of lahars, especially when it was raining heavily in the area around Cemoro Lawang, Ngadisari and Ngadirejo. Eruptions and volcanic tremors were reported during 21–22 January with activity subsiding on 23 January 2011. On 23 January 2011 at 6:00 am, the alert status at Mount Bromo remained at Level III.

On 23 January 2011, an exclusion zone was recommended for communities living around Mount Bromo. Tourists and hikers were advised to not come within a radius of 2 kilometers (1.2 miles) from the active crater. CVGHM stated that they expected warning signs to be installed stating the limit radius of 2 kilometers (1.2 miles) from the crater. Operational caution was recommended for flights into and leaving Juanda International Airport IATA:SUB in Surabaya. CVGHM recommended the establishment of public areas for the provision of face masks and eye protection. CVGHM also issued a warning to residents to be cautious of ash buildup on roofs and other places that may give cause for collapse under the burden of ash.

Further eruptions and the issuing of aviation ash advisories during the period 27–28 January 2011 led to concerns being raised regarding a volcanic ash plume, reported to be drifting eastward toward the air corridors used to access the Ngurah Rai International Airport IATA:DPS in Bali. Airport official Sherly Yunita was reported at the time as stating that concerns about visibility had prompted Singapore Airlines, Jetstar-ValueAir, Air France-KLM, Virgin Blue and Cathay Pacific to cancel several flights to Bali, 340 km (211 mi) to the east. SilkAir also cancelled flights on the 27 January between Singapore and Lombok, an island to the east of Bali. The Volcanic Ash Advisory Centre in Darwin, Australia released several Code Red Aviation Ash Advisories pertaining to Mount Bromo (Tengger Caldera), on 27 January. They indicated that ash was observed at altitudes up to 18,000 feet (5,486 m) (FL180) extending 200 nautical miles (370 km; 230 mi) to the south east of the caldera. In other ash advisories of that day the cloud was reported as at times having a 10 km/h (6.2 mph) drift, both to the east and to the south east.

=== Deformation in late November 2010–late January 2011 ===
The CVGHM reported on 13 January 2011, that deformation using tiltmeter measurements indicated an inflation at rate of 5 micro radians between 25 November 2010 – 14 December 2010 and a relatively stable since 15 December 2010 both on Radial Components and Tangential Components.

Deformation measurement using electronic distance measurement equipment compared observations at designated measuring points; POS-BRO, POS-KUR and POS-BAT during the period 25 November 2010 – 20 December 2010 with observations from the period 21 December 2010 – 30 December 2010 indicated the shortening of the distance from the POS-BAT, or inflation. Observations between 30 December 2010 – 23 January 2011 were reported as relatively stable.

=== 2015 eruption ===
Mount Bromo showed signs of increasing activity beginning on 4 December 2015, when the amount of smoke coming out of the crater intensified. By late November Mount Bromo began to eject ashes into the air. Indonesian Volcano Monitoring Bureau (PVBMG) issued a warning that forbade people from climbing Mount Bromo. Later, the warning was extended into a 1 km (0.62 mi) exclusion zone, before eventually extended into wider range which virtually barred visitors from coming down into the caldera floor, which is popularly known as Sandsea.

== Culture ==
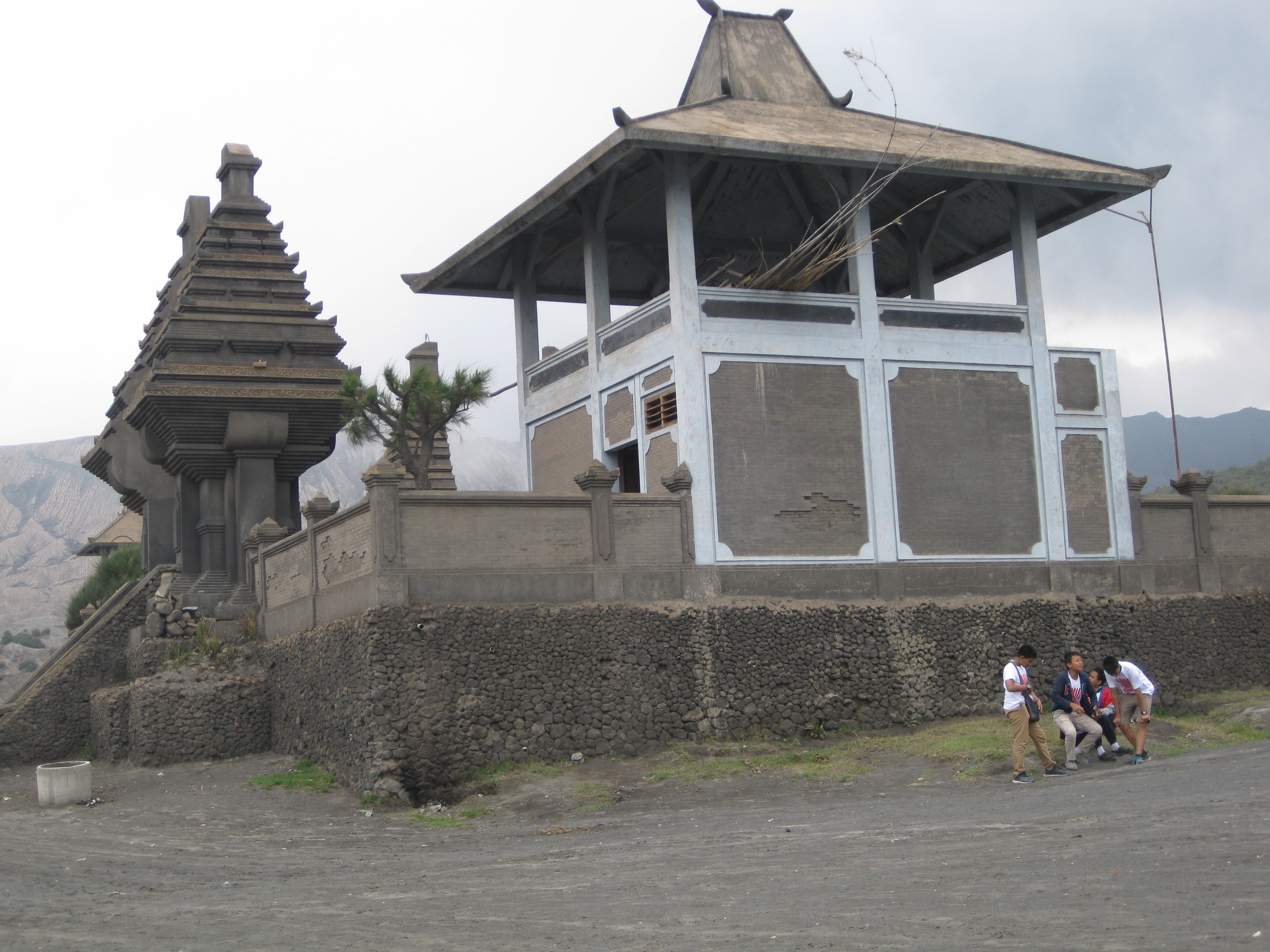
Pura Luhur Poten.

On the fourteenth day of the Hindu festival of Yadnya Kasada, the Tenggerese people of Probolinggo Regency, East Java, travel up the mountain in order to make offerings of fruit, rice, vegetables, flowers and sacrifices of livestock to the mountain gods by throwing them into the caldera of the volcano. The origin of the ritual lies in the 15th century legend. On the sand plain, locally called Segara Wedi (lit. sand ocean), sits a Hindu temple called Pura Luhur Poten. The temple holds a significant importance to the Tenggerese scattered across the mountain villages, such as Ngadisari, Wonokitri, Ngadas, Argosari, Ranu Prani, Ledok Ombo and Wonokerso. The temple organises the annual Yadnya Kasada ceremony which lasts for about one month. The major difference between this temple and Balinese ones are the type of stones and building materials. Pura Luhur Poten uses natural black stones from volcanoes nearby, while Balinese temples are mostly made from red bricks. Inside this pura, there are several buildings and enclosures aligned in a mandala zone composition.

== Gallery ==
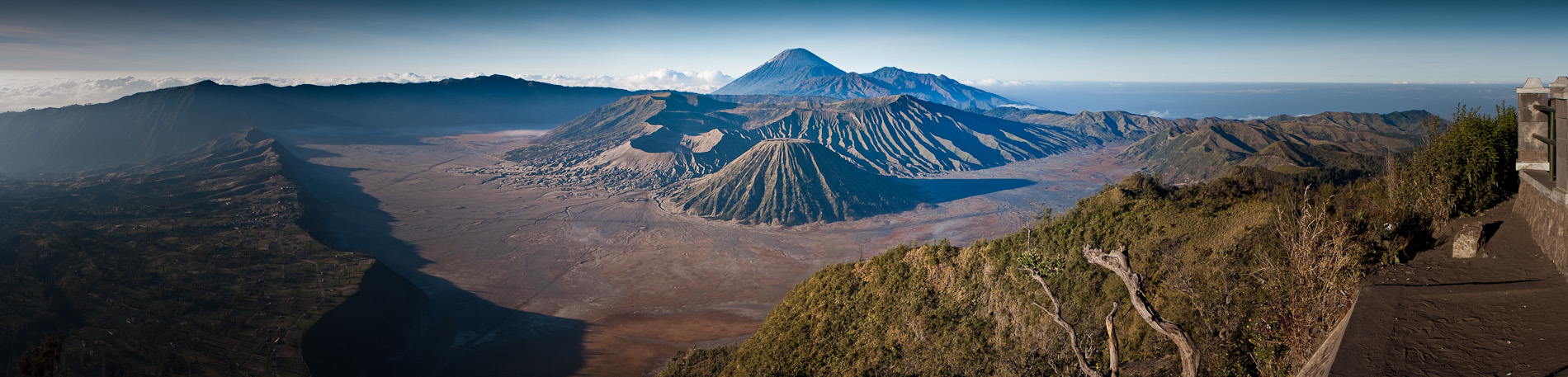
Panoramic view of Mount Bromo crater, Mount Batok, and Semeru from the edge of Segara Wedi ("Sea of Sands").
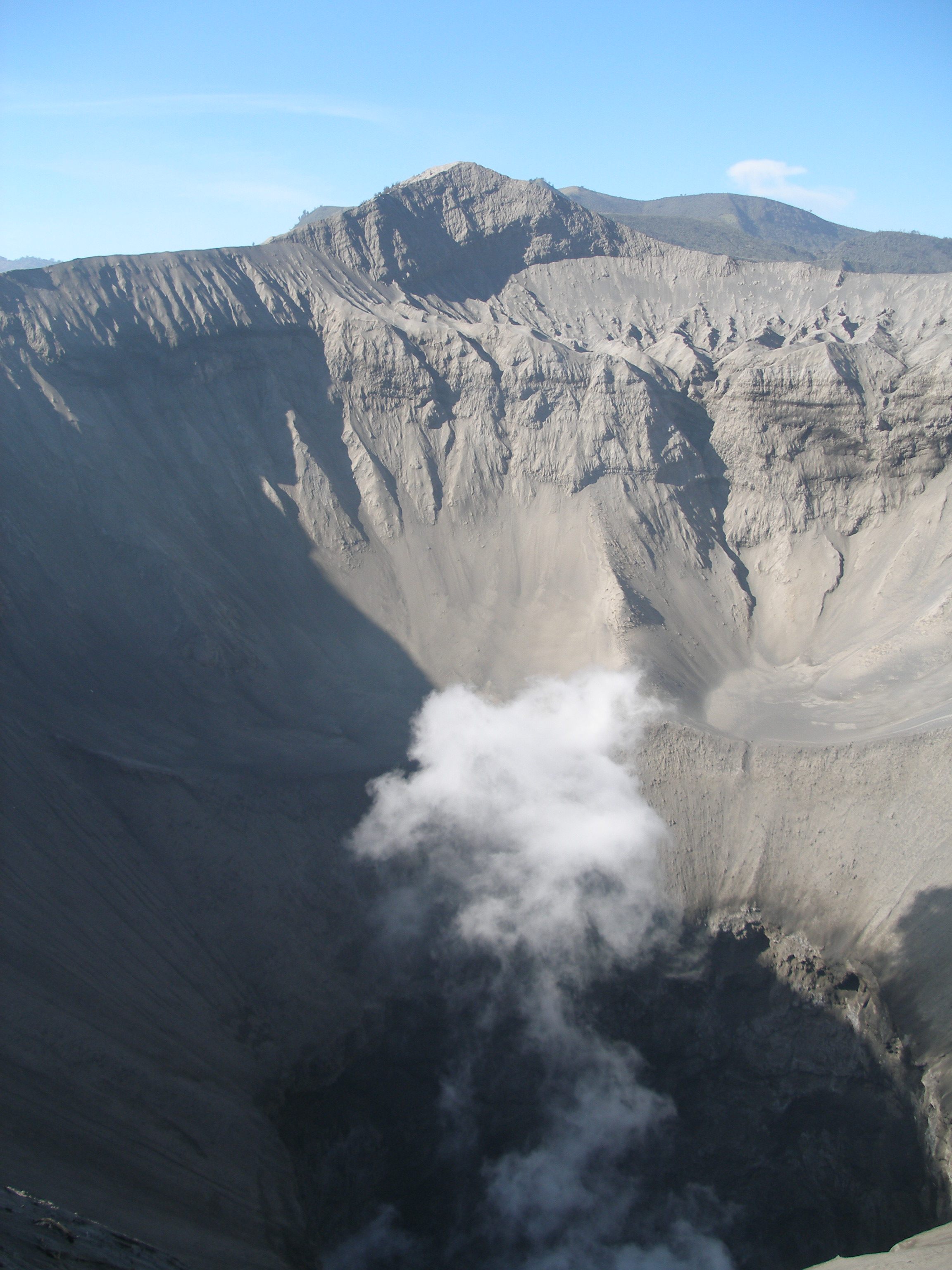
View into the Mount Bromo crater

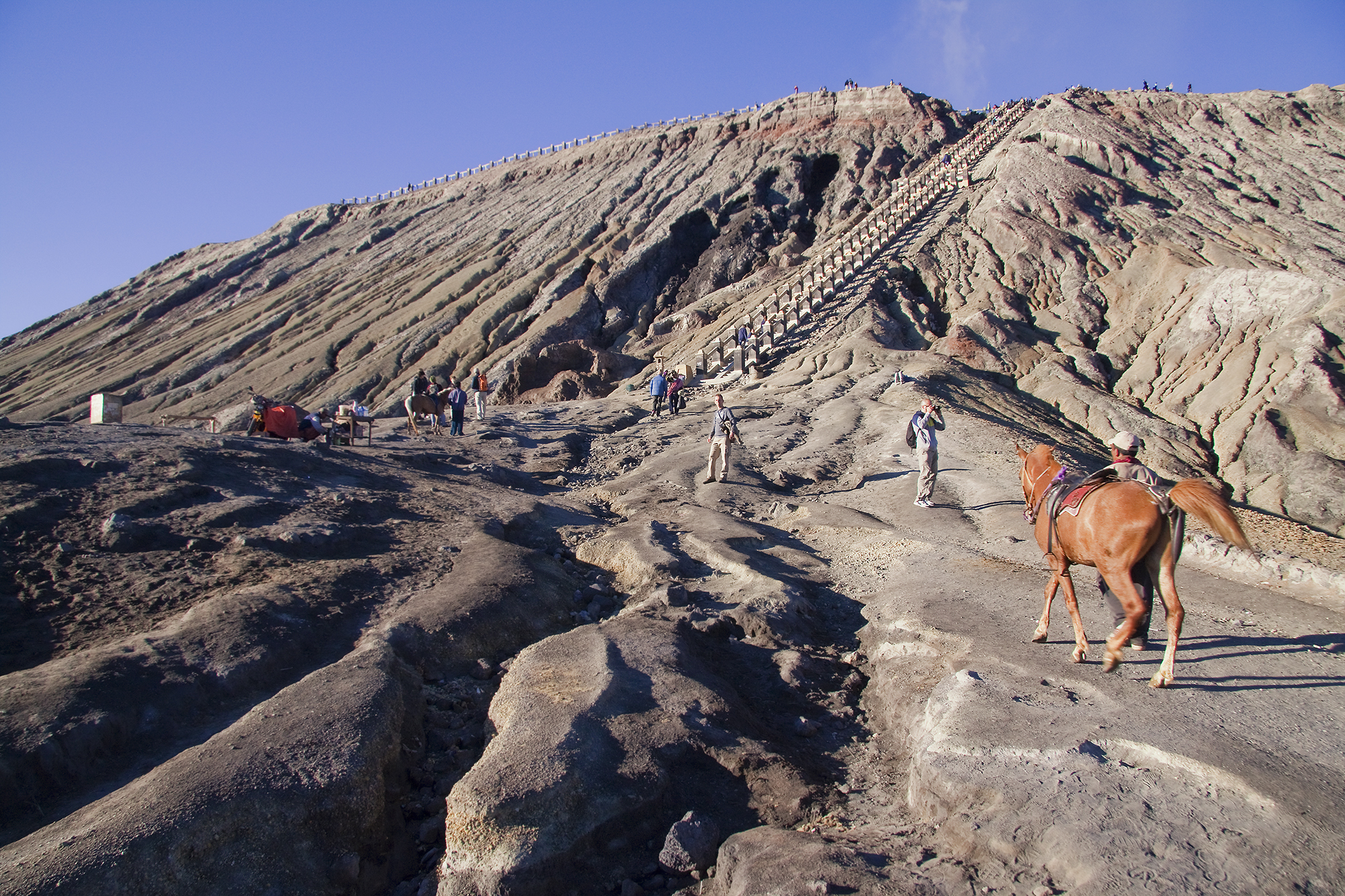
Pathway leading to Mount Bromo caldera

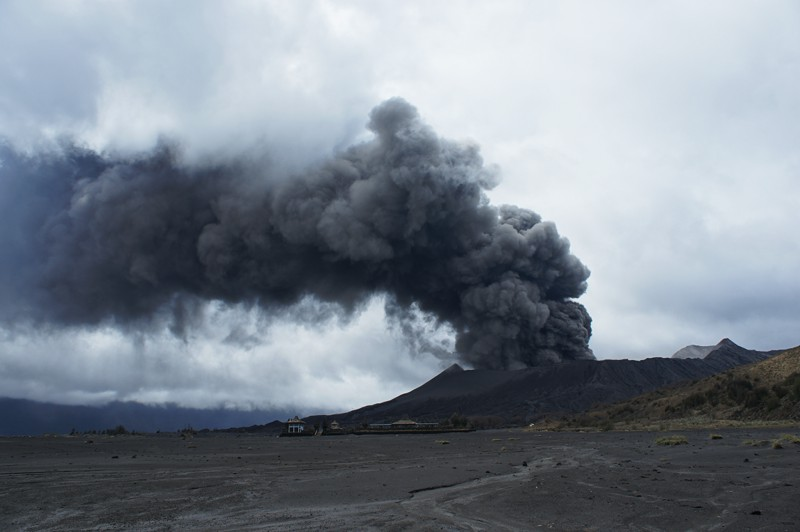
Mount Bromo eruption 22 January 2011

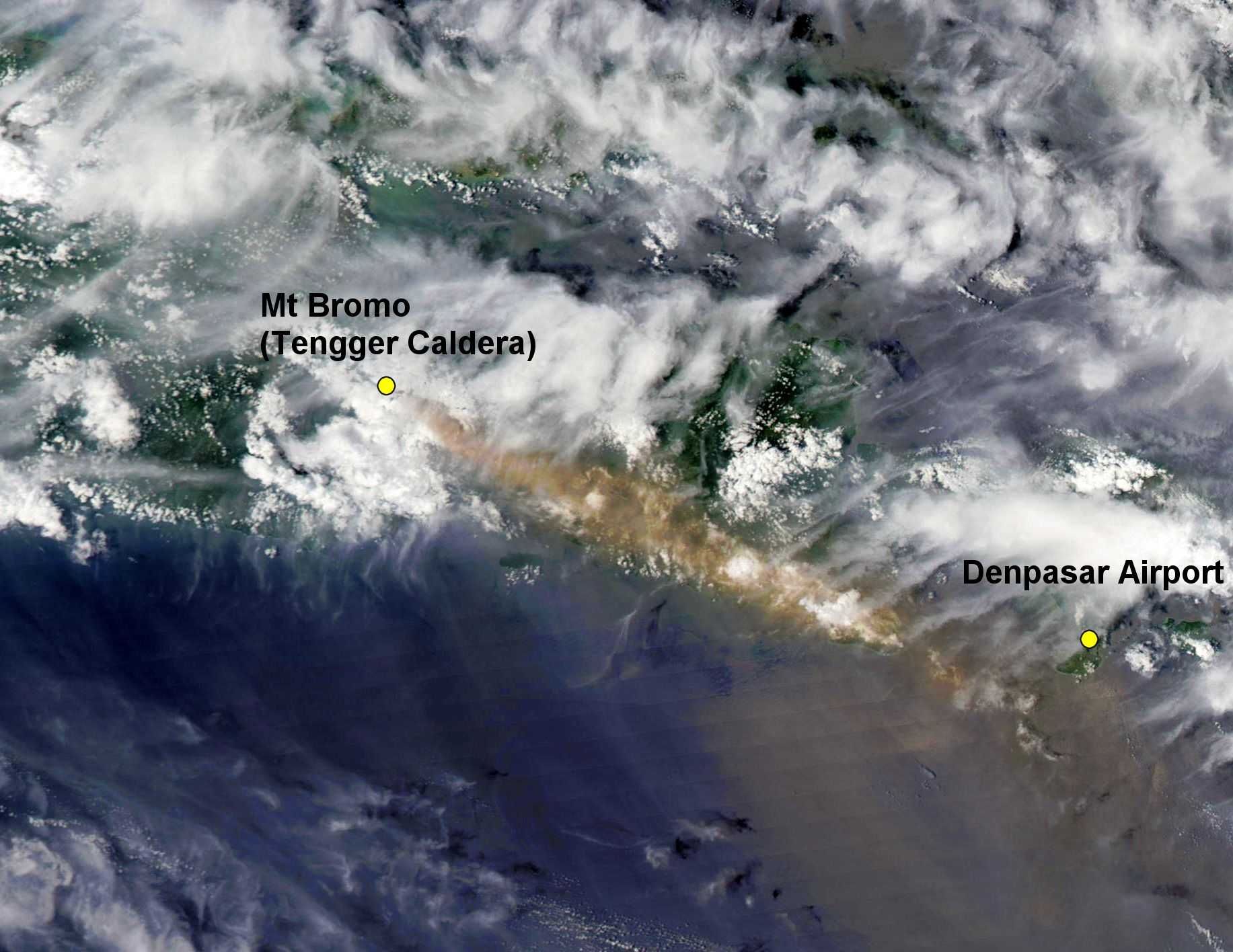
Ash plume from Bromo over Bali, 27 January 2011

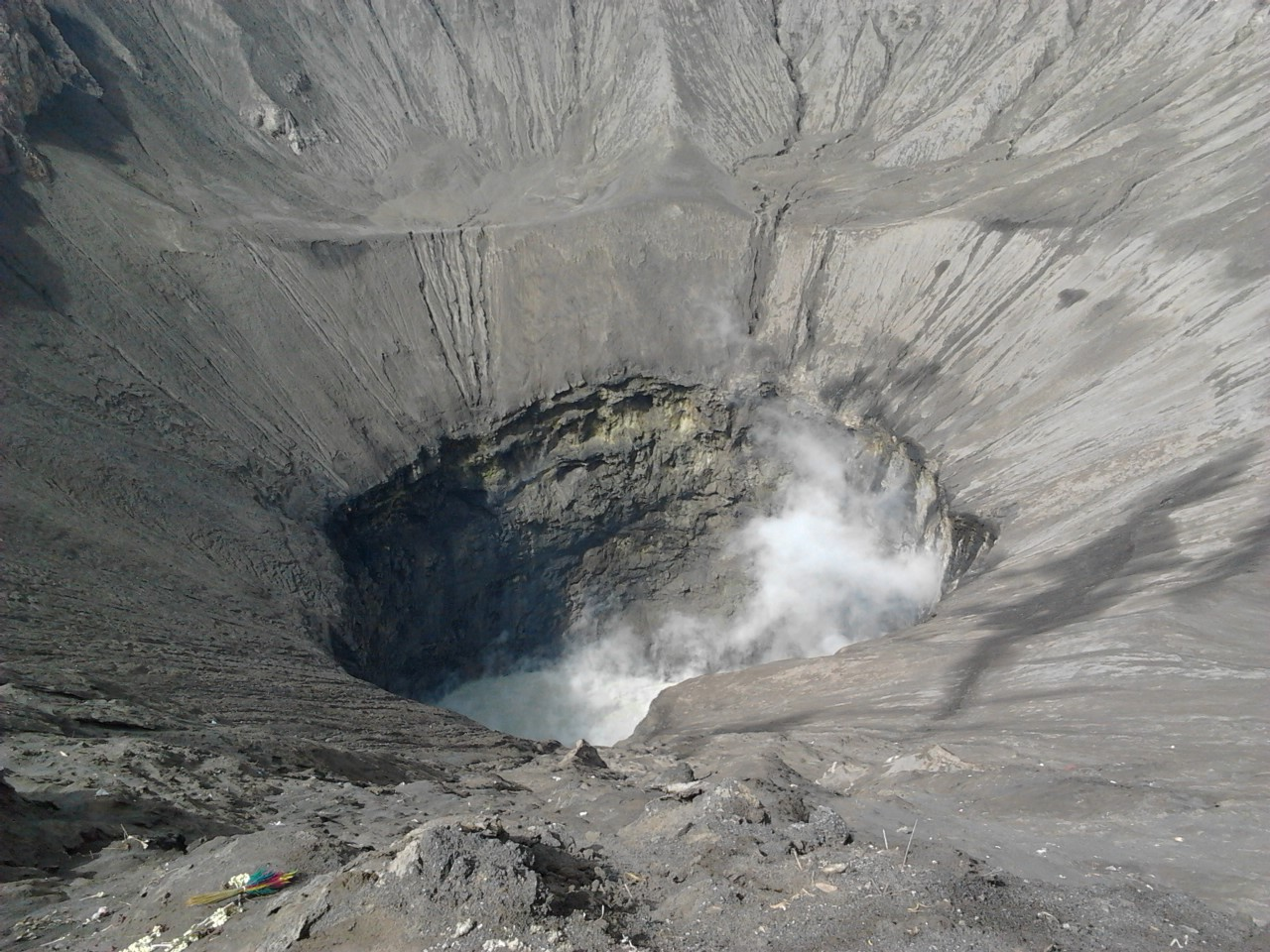
Mount Bromo crater filled with water

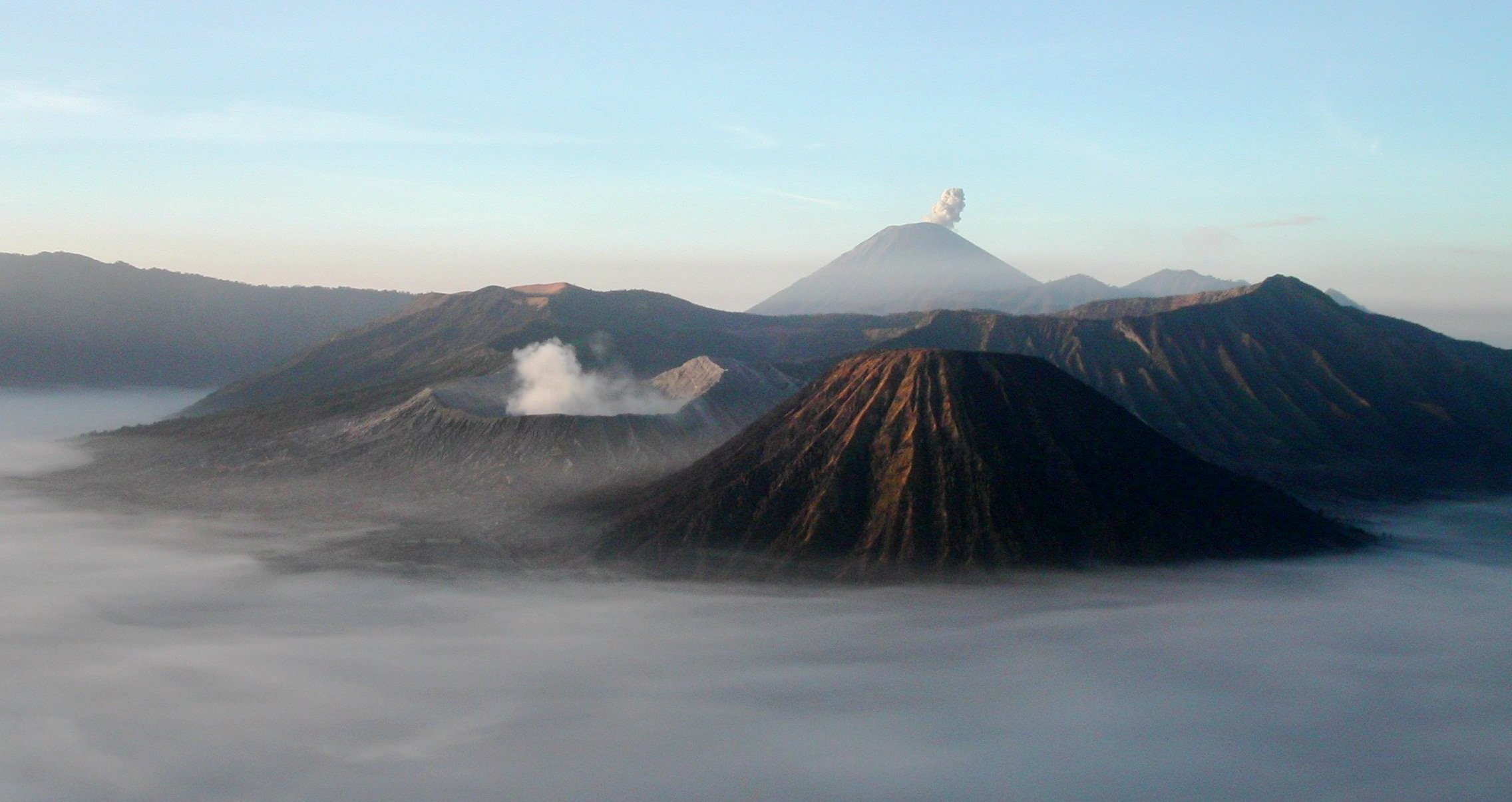
Mt. Bromo (large crater, foreground) at sunrise

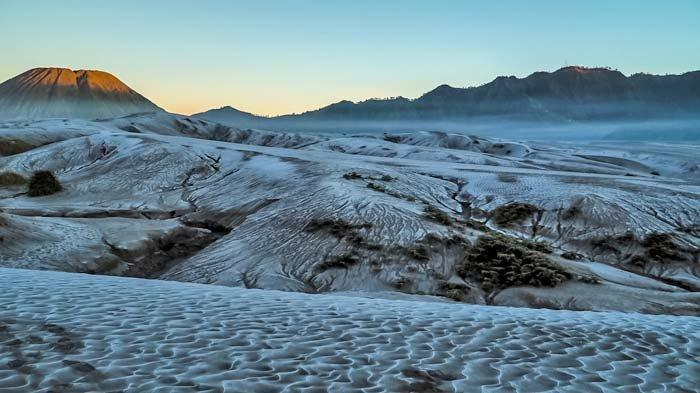
Unique phenomenon on Mount Bromo, ice dew (embun upas) that looks like snow

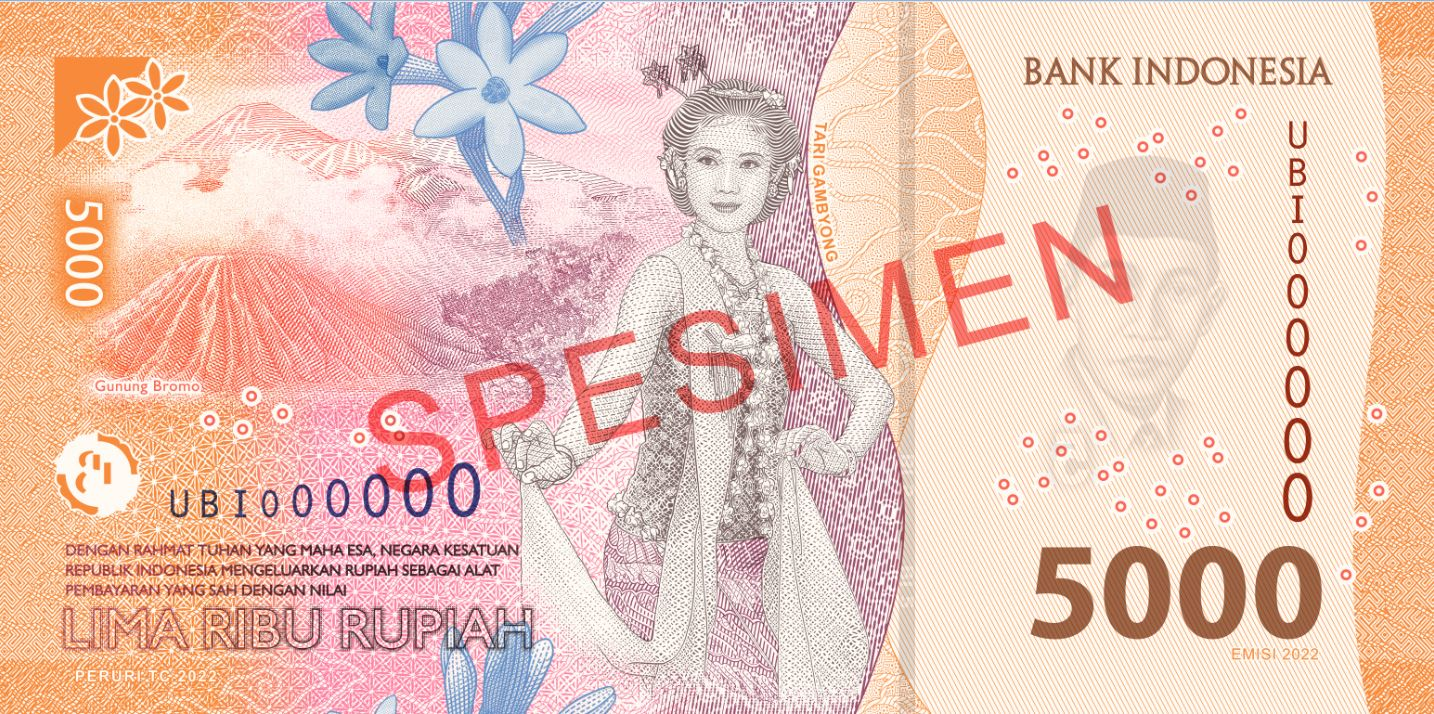
5,000 rupiah banknote featuring Mount Bromo

== See also ==
- Deep Earth Carbon Degassing Project
- List of volcanoes in Indonesia
- Multi-component gas analyzer system
- Volcanism of Java
- Argo Bromo Anggrek
