= Cemoro Lawang =

- Dusun
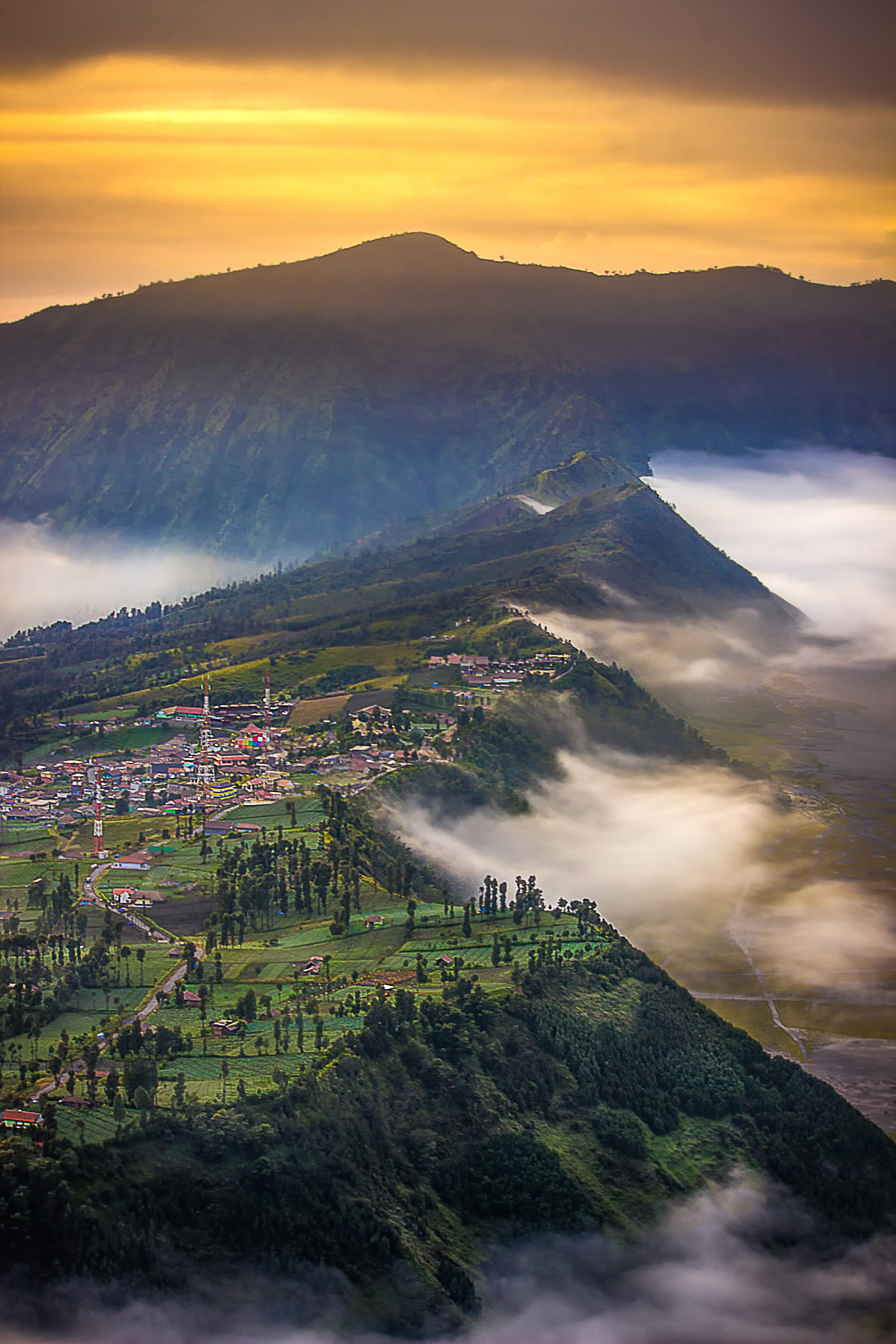
- Cemoro Lawang in the early morning

- Location of Cemoro Lawang Cemoro Lawang (Indonesia)
- Coordinates: 7°55′22″S 112°57′52″E
- Country: Indonesia
- Region: Java
- Province: East Java
- Regency: Probolinggo Regency
- District: Sukapura
- Subdistrict: Ngadisari
- Elevation: 2,217 m (7,274 ft)
- Time zone: UTC+7 (WIB)
- Website: bromotenggersemeru.org

The Cemoro Lawang (also known as Cemorolawang, Cemora Lawang, or Cemara Lawang) is a very small hamlet northeast of Mount Bromo (East Java), Indonesia with an altitude of 2,217 meters above sea level. Administratively, this hamlet is a part of Ngadisari Village, Sukapura, Probolinggo Regency. Cemoro Lawang is one of many routes that point to Tengger Caldera from the Probolinggo route. There is a viewpoint to see Mount Batok and Mount Bromo. It is principally a base for early morning climbs of Mt Bromo, an active volcano that stands in the middle of a Sand Sea. Many visitors approach the mountain from Surabaya, while others come from Bali.

== Geography ==
=== Climate ===
Cemoro Lawang's climate is warm and temperate and is classified as a subtropical highland (Cwb) under the Köppen climate classification. The relatively brief wet season (also known as "summer") occurs from December to March and is known to have tepid temperatures, shorter diurnal ranges, and significant rainfall. The dry season stands out for the remainder of the year (June-September) and is best known for its chilly mornings, incidents of frost, and single-digit temperatures. The average temperature is 13.2 °C, and the average rainfall is 1924 mm.

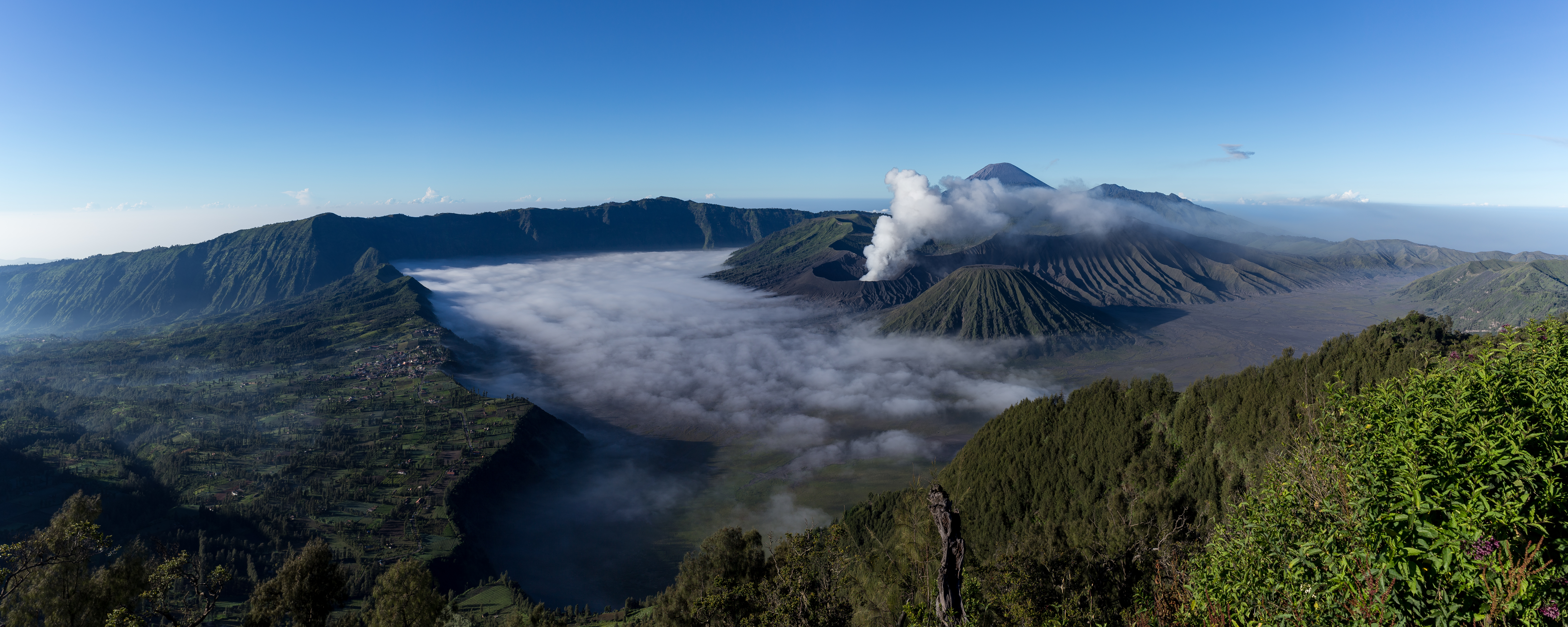
Tengger caldera and settlement of Cemoro Lawang at left side.

Climate data for Cemoro Lawang, Bromo Tengger Semeru National Park (elevation 2,217 m or 7,274 ft)
| Month | Jan | Feb | Mar | Apr | May | Jun | Jul | Aug | Sep | Oct | Nov | Dec | Year |
|---|---|---|---|---|---|---|---|---|---|---|---|---|---|
| Mean daily maximum °C (°F) | 17.3 (63.1) | 17.5 (63.5) | 17.6 (63.7) | 17.4 (63.3) | 17.4 (63.3) | 17 (63) | 16.3 (61.3) | 16.5 (61.7) | 17.1 (62.8) | 17.7 (63.9) | 17.5 (63.5) | 17.3 (63.1) | 17.2 (63.0) |
| Daily mean °C (°F) | 13.6 (56.5) | 13.7 (56.7) | 13.9 (57.0) | 13.5 (56.3) | 13.3 (55.9) | 12.8 (55.0) | 11.8 (53.2) | 12 (54) | 12.5 (54.5) | 13.3 (55.9) | 13.9 (57.0) | 13.6 (56.5) | 13.2 (55.7) |
| Mean daily minimum °C (°F) | 9.9 (49.8) | 9.9 (49.8) | 10.3 (50.5) | 9.7 (49.5) | 9.3 (48.7) | 8.6 (47.5) | 7.4 (45.3) | 7.5 (45.5) | 8 (46) | 9 (48) | 10.3 (50.5) | 10 (50) | 9.2 (48.4) |
| Average precipitation mm (inches) | 297 (11.7) | 334 (13.1) | 348 (13.7) | 181 (7.1) | 104 (4.1) | 63 (2.5) | 33 (1.3) | 15 (0.6) | 19 (0.7) | 70 (2.8) | 145 (5.7) | 315 (12.4) | 1,924 (75.7) |
Source: Climate-Data.org (temp & precip)

== Gallery ==
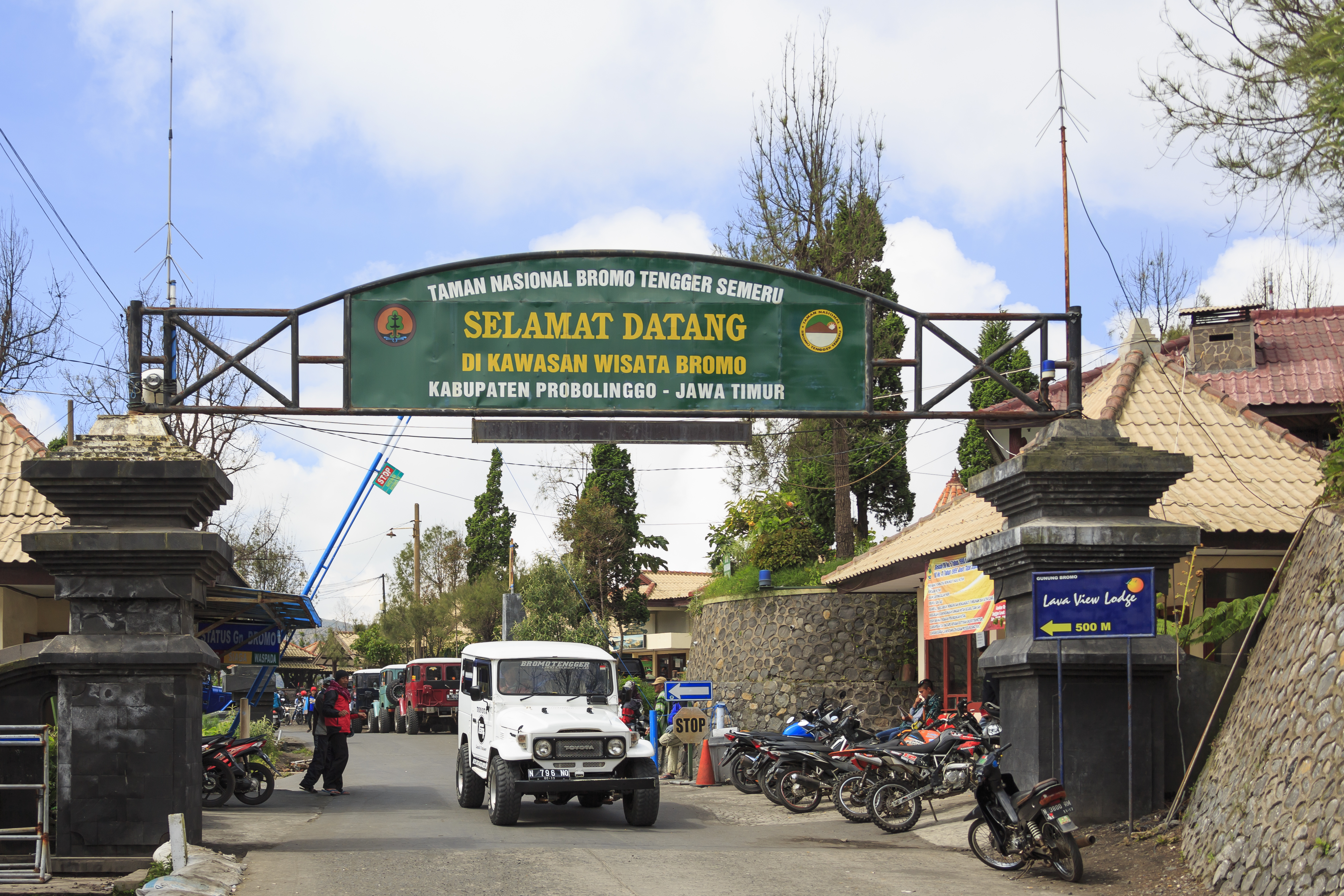
Bromo Tengger Semeru National Park gate in Cemoro Lawang

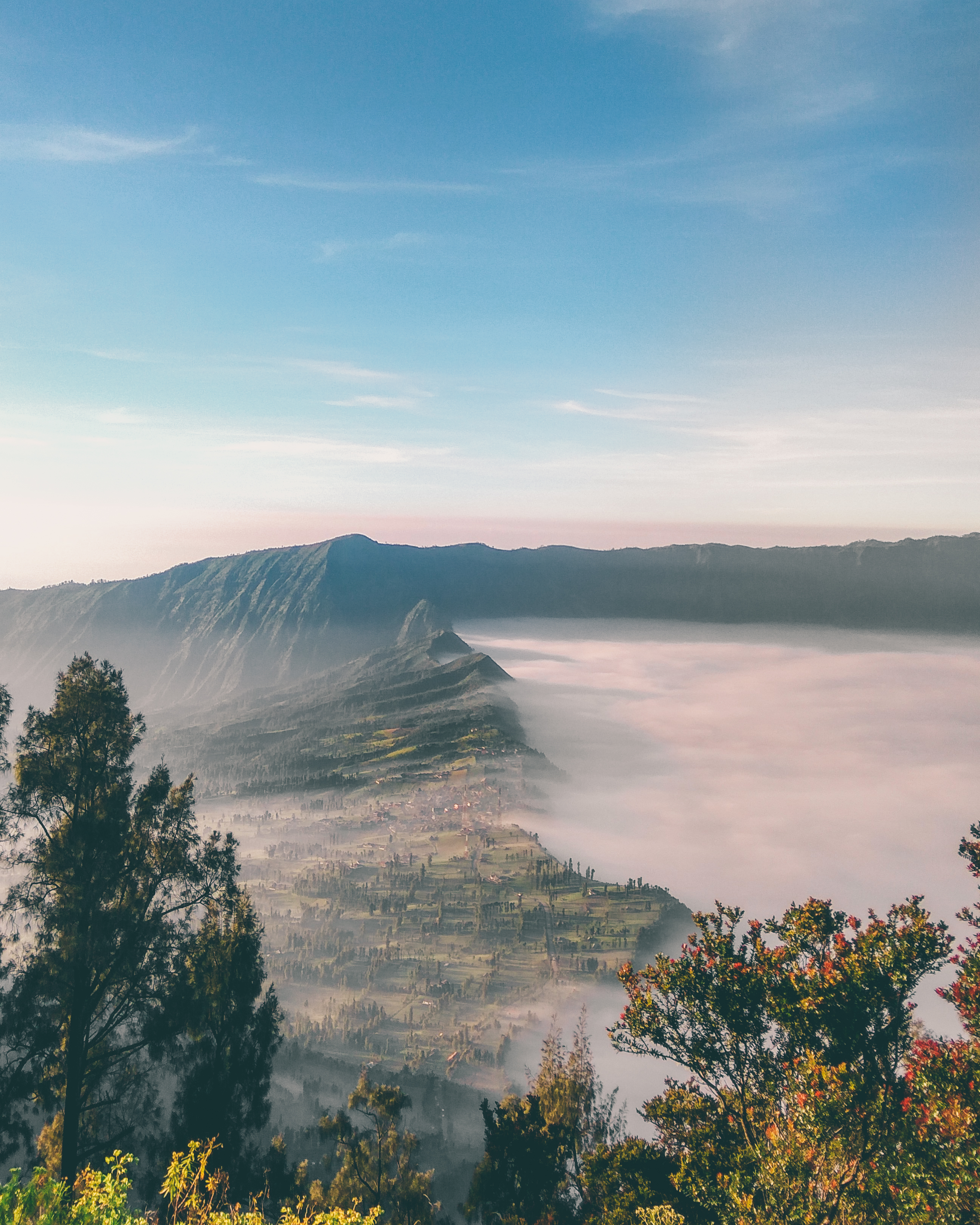
Cemoro Lawang fog

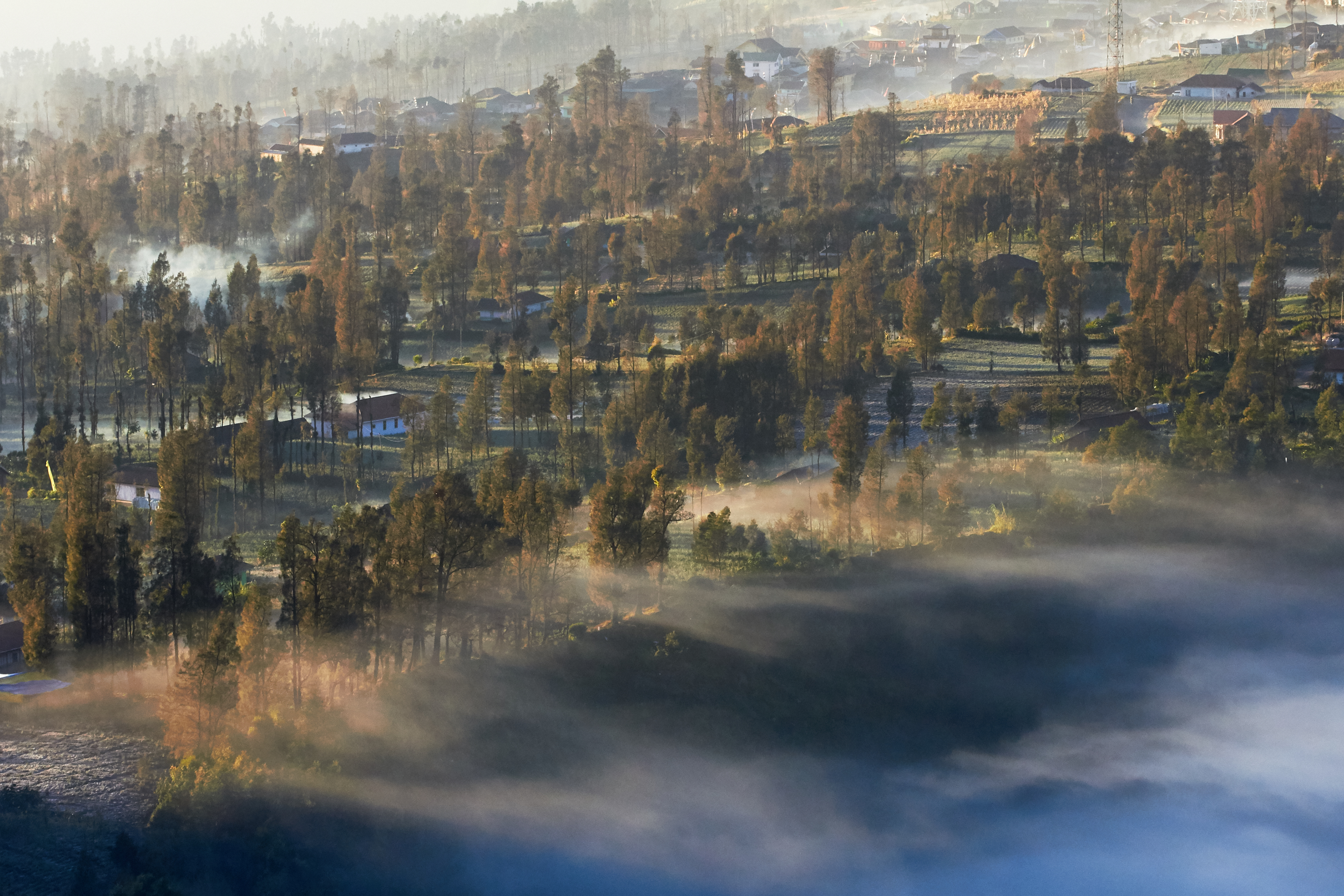
Cemoro Lawang sub-alpine forest

== See also ==
- Mount Bromo
- Bromo Tengger Semeru National Park
