= Ranu Kumbolo =

Crater lake in East Java, Indonesia

Lake Kumbolo
- Ranu Kumbolo (Javanese); Danau Kumbolo (Indonesian)
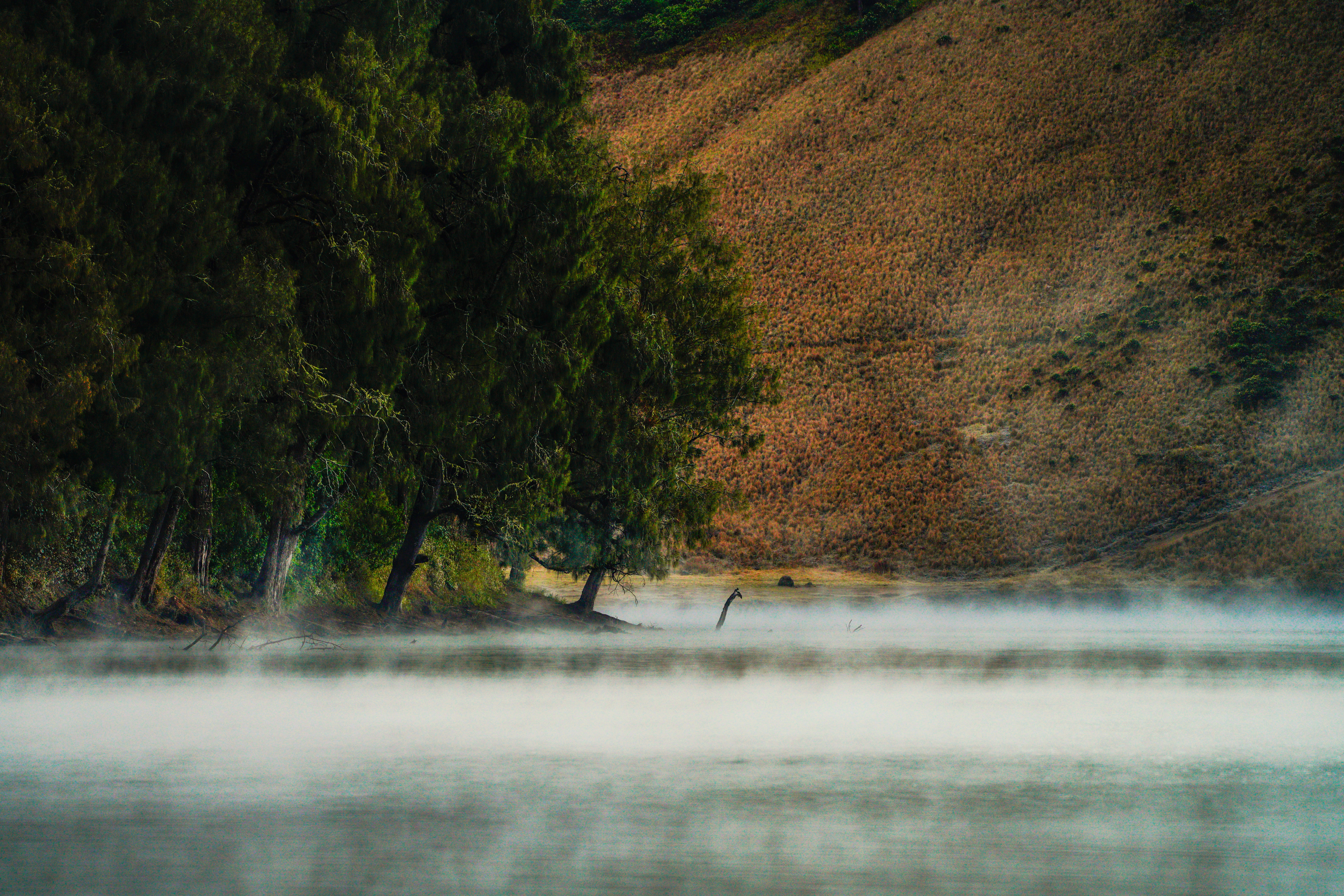
- A view of Ranu Kumbolo

- Location within Java
- Location: Bromo Tengger Semeru National Park, East Java, Indonesia
- Coordinates: 8°03′S 112°55′E
- Type: Volcanic
- Primary inflows: Precipitation only
- Surface area: 15 ha (37 acres)
- Surface elevation: 2,400 m (7,900 ft)

Ranu Kumbolo (Indonesian: Danau Kumbolo) is a mountainous lake located in Bromo Tengger Semeru National Park, East Java, Indonesia. The lake is part of the easiest route from Ranu Pani to Mount Semeru Peak.

== Hiking ==
There are hiking camp areas around the lake. Ranu Kumbolo is part of the easiest route from Ranu Pani to Mahameru Peak.

== Gallery ==
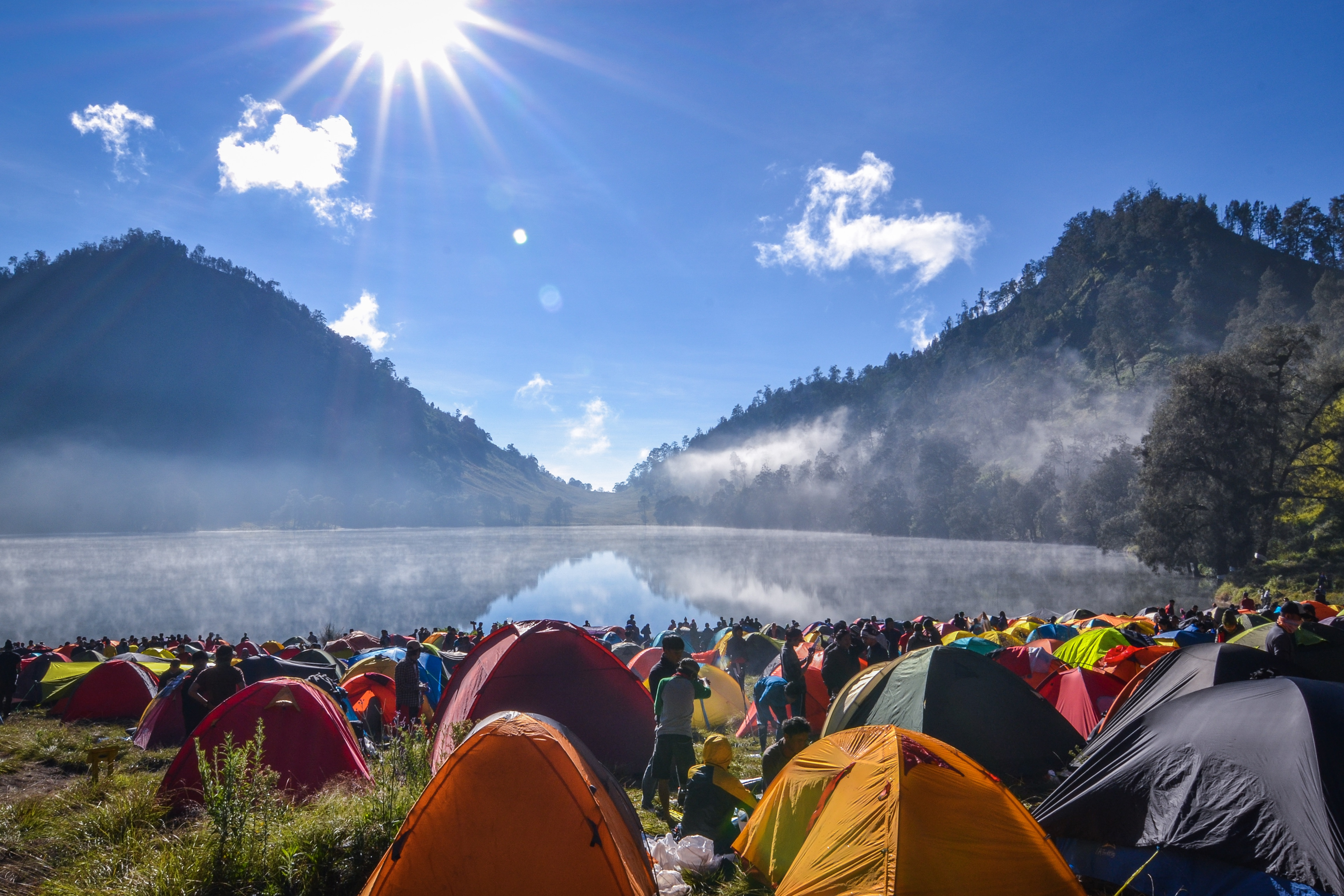
Camping area

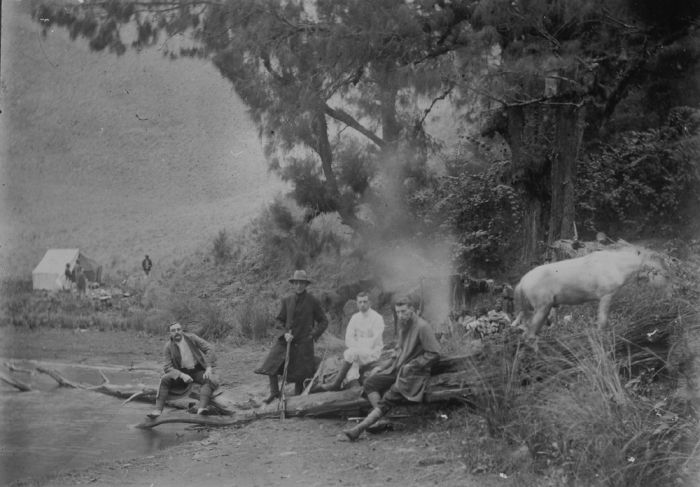
Dutchmen near the lake (c. 1916)

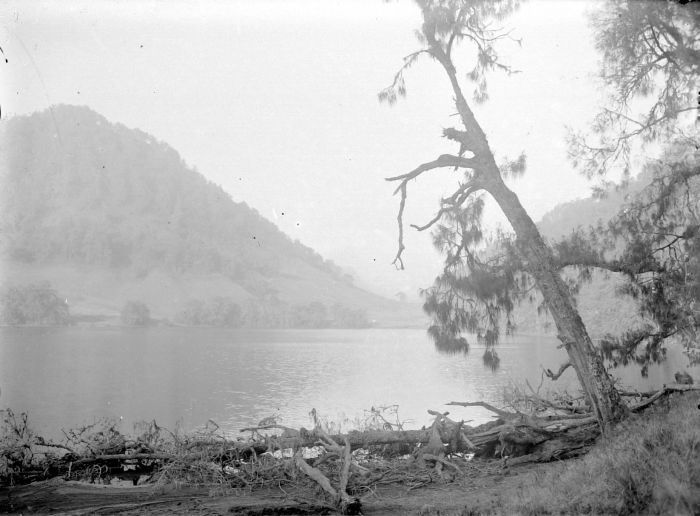
Ranu Kumbolo circa 1913
