= Australia Indonesia Youth Exchange Program =

The Australia-Indonesia Youth Exchange Program (AIYEP) is an exchange program which aims to provide opportunities for young Australians and Indonesians through social, professional and cultural exchange.

The program sees young Indonesian and Australian participants aged between 21 and 25 undertake professional development activities in their respective countries. 42 participants are selected from both countries with equal gender parity (21 male, 21 female). Each Indonesian participant is selected from a different province each while multiple Australian participants may be from the same state or territory.

The program starts with the Indonesian participants arriving in Australia to undertake an internship in a rural, regional, or remote area in Australia (including Canberra) for one month followed undertaking a different internship at a major Australian city, usually within the same state or territory, for another month. After two months, they meet their 18 Australian counterparts where they travel together to Indonesia to undertake a similar experience in an Indonesian province as a group of thirty-six. In Indonesia, they experience a homestay in a rural and an urban area in the same Indonesian province. The rural phase in Indonesia formerly involved a community development project conducted in teams of both Australian and Indonesian delegates. The urban phase is held in the biggest city of the chosen Indonesian province, where delegates complete a professional work-place internship. From 2023, the program will not include a rural community development phase in Indonesia and will only be held for one-month in each country.

== History ==
The program was established in 1981 and is an initiative of the Australia-Indonesia Institute (Department of Foreign Affairs and Trade). Since 2020, the program has been delivered by intercultural competency consulting organisation, Value Learning. From 2020 to 2023, AIYEP was held online due to travel restrictions from the COVID-19 pandemic.

== Locations ==
- 2025: Melbourne/Lampung
- 2024/25: Canberra/Lombok
- 2023/24: Canberra/Bangka Belitung Islands
- 2022/23: Online
- 2021/22: Online
- 2020/21: Online (due to COVID-19 pandemic)
- 2019/20: Canberra-Queensland/East Java
- 2018/19: Victoria/Riau
- 2017/18: Central Coast-Canberra-Sydney/Babakan Baru-Kaur-Bengkulu City
- 2016/17: South Australia/South Sulawesi
- 2015/16: New South Wales/West Kalimantan
- 2014/15: Western Australia/South Kalimantan
- 2013/14: New South Wales/West Sumatra
- 2012/13: Victoria/Yogyakarta
- 2011/12: South Australia/Riau
- 2010/11: Queensland/Southeast Sulawesi
- 2009/10: Western Australia/Bangka Belitung
- 2008/09: New South Wales/East Java
- 2002/2003: Sydney-Orange, NSW, Kota Makassar-Malino Kab. Gowa Sulawesi Selatan
- 2001/02:(Melbourne-Mildura-Canberra)-(Lampung-Kalianda-Rajabasa)
- 2000/2001: Brisbane–Toowoomba / Malang - Batu
- 1992/93: Western Australia/East Java. (Desa Parang and Kota Madiun)
