= Ngadas =

- Location in East Java and Indonesia Ngadas (Indonesia)
- Coordinates: 7°58′55.6932″S 112°54′24.8688″E
- Country: Indonesia
- Province: East Java
- Regency: Malang Regency
- District: Poncokusumo District
- Elevation: 6,795 ft (2,071 m)

Population (2010)
  - Total: 1,791
- Time zone: UTC+7 (Western Indonesia Time)

Ngadas (Indonesian pronunciation: [ˈŋadas]) is a village in Poncokusumo District, Malang Regency in East Java Province. Its population is 1791.

== Climate ==
Ngadas has a subtropical highland climate (Cwb). It has moderate to little rainfall from May to October and heavy to very heavy rainfall from November to April.

Climate data for Ngadas
| Month | Jan | Feb | Mar | Apr | May | Jun | Jul | Aug | Sep | Oct | Nov | Dec | Year |
|---|---|---|---|---|---|---|---|---|---|---|---|---|---|
| Mean daily maximum °C (°F) | 18.3 (64.9) | 18.4 (65.1) | 18.6 (65.5) | 18.3 (64.9) | 18.2 (64.8) | 17.8 (64.0) | 17.2 (63.0) | 17.3 (63.1) | 18.0 (64.4) | 18.5 (65.3) | 18.3 (64.9) | 18.2 (64.8) | 18.1 (64.6) |
| Daily mean °C (°F) | 14.6 (58.3) | 14.6 (58.3) | 14.9 (58.8) | 14.4 (57.9) | 14.1 (57.4) | 13.6 (56.5) | 12.7 (54.9) | 12.7 (54.9) | 13.4 (56.1) | 14.1 (57.4) | 14.6 (58.3) | 14.5 (58.1) | 14.0 (57.2) |
| Mean daily minimum °C (°F) | 10.9 (51.6) | 10.8 (51.4) | 11.2 (52.2) | 10.6 (51.1) | 10.1 (50.2) | 9.4 (48.9) | 8.2 (46.8) | 8.2 (46.8) | 8.8 (47.8) | 9.8 (49.6) | 11.0 (51.8) | 10.9 (51.6) | 10.0 (50.0) |
| Average precipitation mm (inches) | 297 (11.7) | 328 (12.9) | 347 (13.7) | 182 (7.2) | 108 (4.3) | 63 (2.5) | 31 (1.2) | 15 (0.6) | 20 (0.8) | 79 (3.1) | 159 (6.3) | 319 (12.6) | 1,948 (76.9) |
Source: Climate-Data.org
