= Lumajang Regency =

Regency in East Java, Indonesia

Lumajang Regency Kabupaten Lumajang
- Regency

Other transcription(s)
  - Javanese: Lamajang (Gêdrig) لاماجاڠ (Pégon) ꦭꦩꦗꦁ (Hånåcåråkå)
  - Madurese: Lomajhâng (Latèn) لَوماجۤاڠ (Pèghu) ꦭꦺꦩꦗꦁ (Carakan)
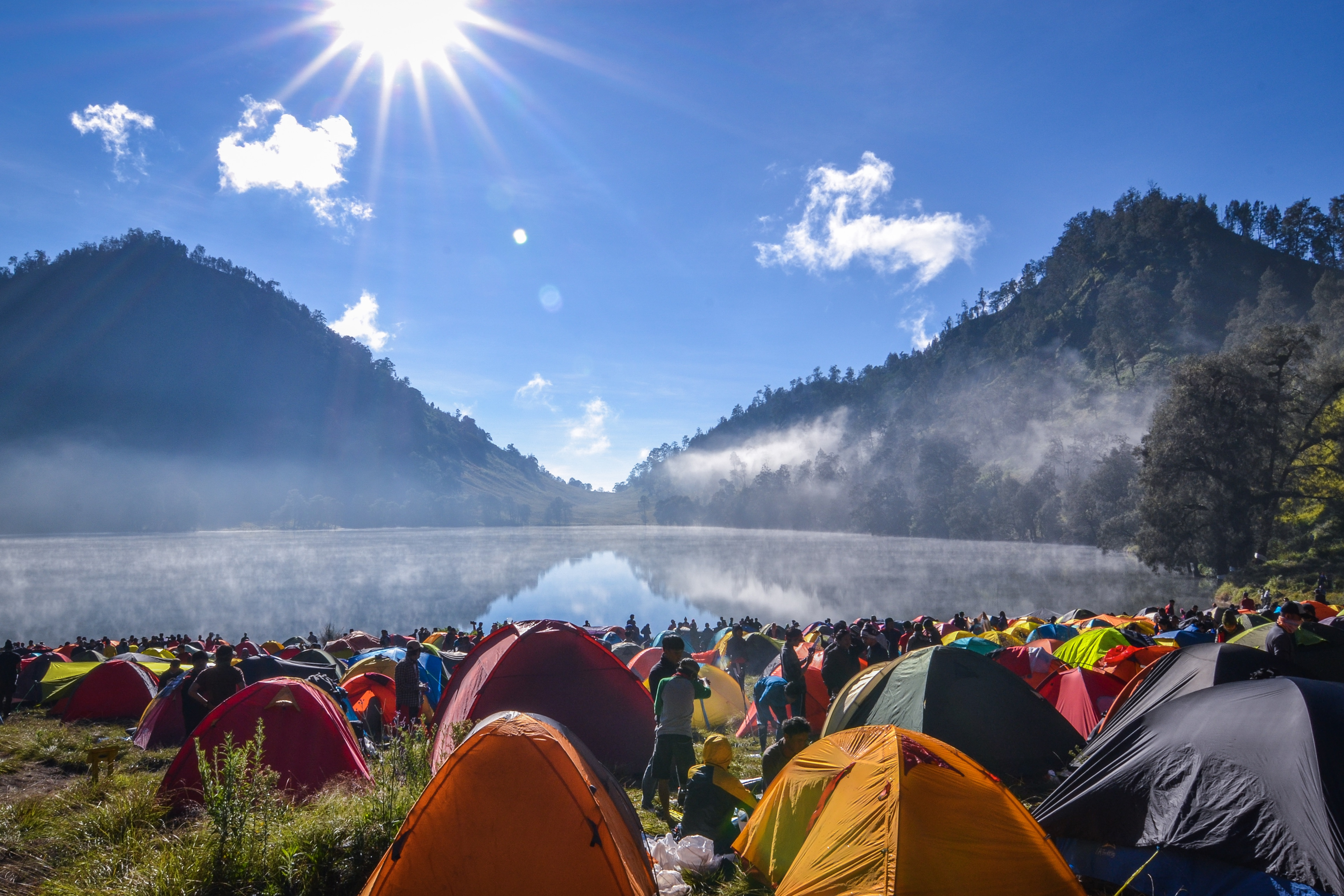
- Ranu Kumbolo

- Coat of arms
- Motto(s): Amreta Brata Wira Bhakti (Eternal virtue by act of gallantry and devotion)
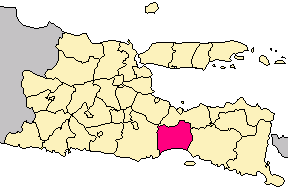
- Location within East Java

- Location in Java and Indonesia Lumajang Regency (Indonesia)
- Coordinates: 8°08′S 113°13′E
- Country: Indonesia
- Province: East Java
- Established: 15 December 1255
- Capital: Lumajang

Government
  - Regent: Indah Amperawati Masdar
  - Vice Regent: Yudha Adji Kusuma

Area
  - Total: 1,790.90 km^{2} (691.47 sq mi)

Population (mid 2025 estimate)
  - Total: 1,126,347
  - Density: 628.928/km^{2} (1,628.92/sq mi)
- Time zone: UTC+7 (IWST)
- Area code: (+62) 334
- Website: lumajangkab.go.id

Lumajang Regency (Indonesian: Kabupaten Lumajang) is a Regency (kabupaten) located in the East Java province of Indonesia. It covers an area of 1,790.90 sq. km, and had a population of 1,006,458 at the 2010 Census and 1,119,251 at the 2020 Census; the official estimate for mid 2025 was 1,126,347 (comprising 558,771 males and 567,576 females). The regency shares its land borders with Jember Regency (to the east), Probolinggo Regency (to the north), and Malang Regency (to the west), while it borders the Indian Ocean to the south.

== Geography ==
Lumajang is located approximately 150 km southeast of Surabaya. Its temperature ranges between 24 °C to 32 °C.

== History ==
Lumajang is one of the ancient cities in Java which still exist up to this day. According to Mula Malurung artifact (dated 1177 Saka), Lumajang was then ruled by King Nararyya Kirana Sminingrat. The date of the artifact, which is 15 December 1255 in the Gregorian calendar, was decided as the date of establishment of Lumajang. Menhirs found in the districts of Senduro, Gucialit, Sukodono, Klakah, and Lumajang reveal that in prehistoric times, the present area of Lumajang had already been inhabited long before the date of Mula Malurung artifact.

== Government ==
=== Politics ===
For legislators elected in 2024, the regency is represented in the national and provincial houses of representatives as part of East Java's 4th electoral district and the provincial 5th electoral district, respectively, both of which it shares with neighboring Jember Regency. The municipal legislature has 50 members elected from 7 electoral districts. The current acting regent, serving since 24 September 2023, is Indah Wahyuni, who replaced the previously elected regent Thoriqul Haq.

=== Administrative districts ===
Lumajang Regency is divided into 21 districts (kecamatan), tabulated below with their areas and their populations at the 2010 Census and the 2020 Census, together with the official estimates as at mid 2025. Each district bears the same name as its administrative centre. The table also includes the numbers of administrative villages in each district (totalling 198 rural desa and 7 urban kelurahan - the latter all in Lumajang (town) District), and the post codes.

Kode Wilayah	Name of District (kecamatan)	Area in km^{2}	Pop'n Census 2010	Pop'n Census 2020	Pop'n Estimate mid 2025	No. of villages	Post code
35.08.01	Tempursari	105.35	28,501	33,819	33,536	7	67375
35.08.02	Pronojiwo	141.49	31,737	37,759	36,671	6	67374
35.08.03	Candipuro	143.09	62,226	73,617	77,045	10	67373
35.08.04	Pasirian	128.39	83,683	92,035	91,246	11	67372
35.08.05	Tempeh	73.21	78,806	85,929	85,779	13	67371
35.08.10	Lumajang (town)	28.47	80,685	84,649	85,046	12 ^{(a)}	67316 ^{(b)}
35.08.21	Sumbersuko	29.07	33,913	36,137	37,041	8	67316
35.08.09	Tekung	27.88	32,565	35,565	36,033	8	67381
35.08.06	Kunir	53.30	51,679	56,181	56,967	11	67383
35.08.07	Yosowilangun	72.44	56,546	61,299	61,193	12	67382
35.08.08	Rowokangkung	58.88	34,149	38,391	38,512	7	67359
35.08.17	Jatiroto	53.69	45,247	48,226	48,392	6	67355
35.08.18	Randuagung	93.92	60,853	70,343	71,243	12	67354
35.08.15	Sukodono	28.81	49,949	56,352	57,477	10	67351
35.08.14	Padang	53.83	34,615	37,943	38,527	9	67352
35.08.11	Pasrujambe	162.47	34,916	40,987	41,867	7	67361
35.08.12	Senduro	170.90	42,892	49,314	51,188	12	67362
35.08.13	Gucialit	101.79	23,436	26,274	26,411	9	67353
35.08.16	Kedungjajang	66.13	43,499	47,685	47,235	12	67358
35.08.19	Klakah	87.42	51,118	56,664	55,471	12	67356
35.08.20	Ranuyoso	110.36	45,443	50,082	49,467	11	67357
	Totals	1,790.90	1,006,458	1,119,251	1,126,347	205	

Notes: (a) comprising 7 urban kelurahan (Tompokerasan, Citrodiwangsan, Ditotrunan, Jogotrunan, Jogoyudan, Kepuharjo and Rogotrunan) and 5 rural desa.
(b) except the kelurahan of Tompokerasan (postcode 67311), Citrodiwangsan (67312), Ditotrunan (67313), Jogotrunan (67314) and Jogoyudan (67315);
the other kelurahan of Kepuharjo and Rogotrunan share the 67316 postcode with the 5 desa within Lumajang District and the whole of Sumbersuko District.

== Demographics ==
The population consists of a majority of Javanese people and Madurese people. In addition, there are also minorities of Chinese, Arabs, and Tenggerese. Javanese people are mostly spread across the western, southern coast, central, and eastern, while Madurese people are dominant in the mountainous regions in the northern, with some others in the eastern and southern. Also, the Tenggerese people mainly inhabit in Senduro district, near Mount Bromo and Mount Semeru. Many other ethnic minorities live in urban Lumajang.

== Climate ==
Lumajang has a tropical savanna climate (Aw) with moderate to little rainfall from May to September and heavy to very heavy rainfall from October to April.

Climate data for Lumajang
Month	Jan	Feb	Mar	Apr	May	Jun	Jul	Aug	Sep	Oct	Nov	Dec	Year
Mean daily maximum °C (°F)	31.8 (89.2)	31.7 (89.1)	31.8 (89.2)	31.7 (89.1)	31.5 (88.7)	31.4 (88.5)	31.2 (88.2)	31.8 (89.2)	32.7 (90.9)	33.2 (91.8)	32.7 (90.9)	31.9 (89.4)	32.0 (89.5)
Daily mean °C (°F)	26.7 (80.1)	26.6 (79.9)	26.6 (79.9)	26.4 (79.5)	25.8 (78.4)	25.0 (77.0)	24.2 (75.6)	24.8 (76.6)	25.5 (77.9)	26.4 (79.5)	26.6 (79.9)	26.4 (79.5)	25.9 (78.6)
Mean daily minimum °C (°F)	21.6 (70.9)	21.6 (70.9)	21.4 (70.5)	21.1 (70.0)	20.1 (68.2)	18.7 (65.7)	17.3 (63.1)	17.8 (64.0)	18.4 (65.1)	19.6 (67.3)	20.6 (69.1)	21.0 (69.8)	19.9 (67.9)
Average rainfall mm (inches)	259 (10.2)	253 (10.0)	251 (9.9)	166 (6.5)	113 (4.4)	59 (2.3)	47 (1.9)	17 (0.7)	39 (1.5)	133 (5.2)	198 (7.8)	280 (11.0)	1,815 (71.4)
Source: Climate-Data.org

== Places of interest ==
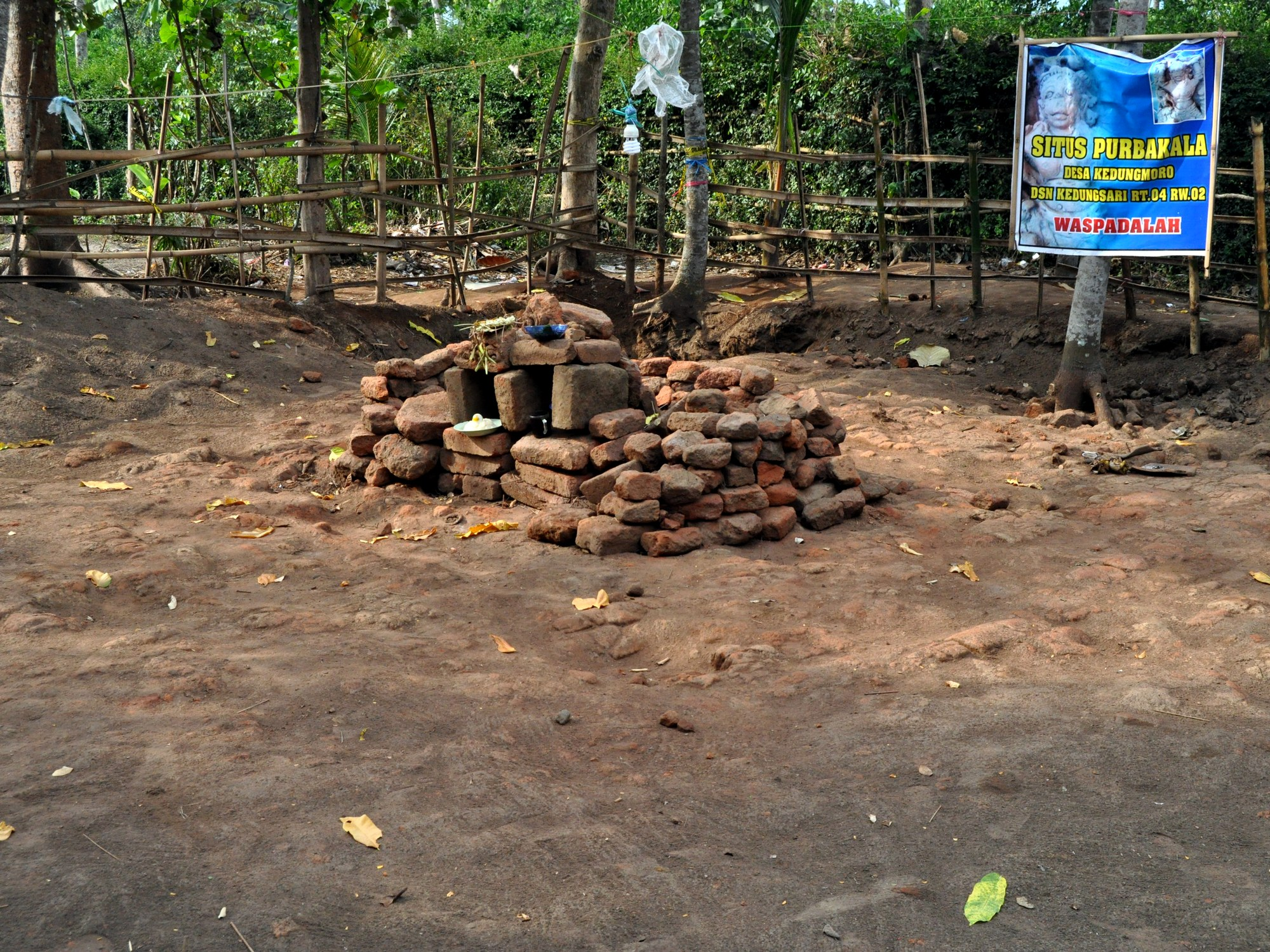
Remains of Candi Kunir, discovered in 2013

- Agrowisata Royal Family (agro, fruit picking centers, outbound, and family vacation spot)
- Selokambang—a natural swimming pool
- The Triangle Lake, which consists of three crater lakes (Ranu Klakah, Ranu Bedali, Ranu Pakis)
- Ranu Pane, Ranu Regulo, Ranu Kumbolo—crater lakes at the slope of Mount Semeru
- Mount Semeru
- Tetes Cave
- Mandara Giri Temple
- Piket Nol (highway place where we can see Cold Lava from Semeru)
- Tumpak Sewu Waterfalls
