= Semeru =

Stratovolcano in Indonesia

- (Javanese: ꦱꦼꦩꦺꦫꦸ, romanized: sěmèru)
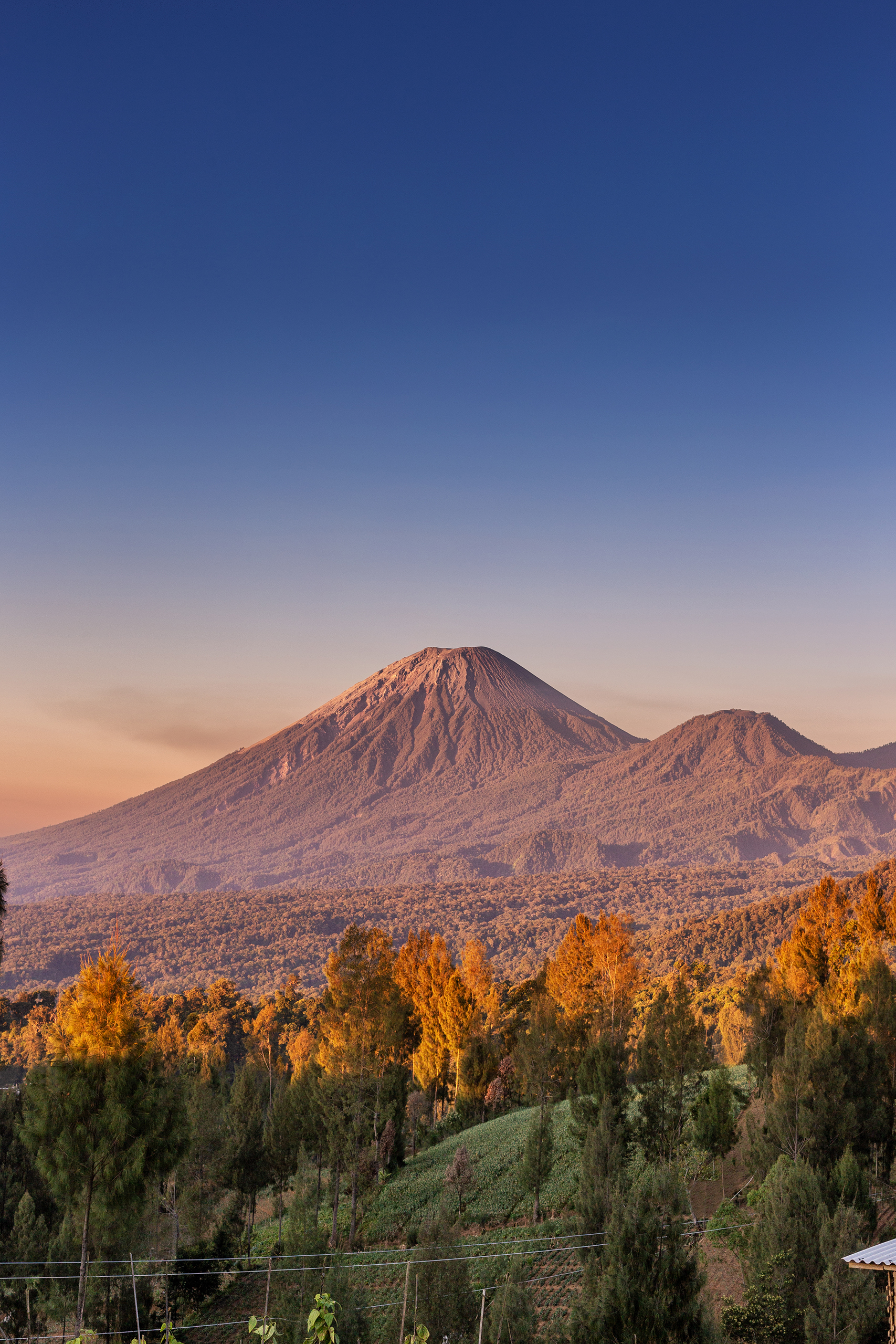

Highest point
- Elevation: 3,676 m (12,060 ft)
- Prominence: 3,676 m (12,060 ft); Ranked 45th
- Isolation: 390.92 km (242.91 mi)
- Listing: Island high point 12th Ultra; Ribu
- Coordinates: 08°06′28″S 112°55′19″E

Geography
- Location within Java Location within Indonesia
- Location: Java, Indonesia
- Headwaters of river basins: Mujur, Rejali, Glidik & Brantas basin

Geology
- Mountain type: Stratovolcano
- Volcanic zone: Ring of Fire
- Volcanic arc: Sunda Arc
- Last eruption: 28 August 2026

Climbing
- First ascent: Unknown
- Easiest route: Hike

Semeru is the highest mountain on the Indonesian island of Java and an active volcano located in the province of East Java in a subduction zone, where the Indo-Australian Plate subducts under the Eurasian Plate. Semeru is 3,676 m tall at its peak, making it the third tallest volcano mountain in Indonesia after Kerinci and Rinjani.

The name "Semeru" is derived from Meru, the central world mountain in Hinduism, or Sumeru, the abode of gods. This stratovolcano is Mahameru, meaning "The Great Mountain" in Sanskrit.

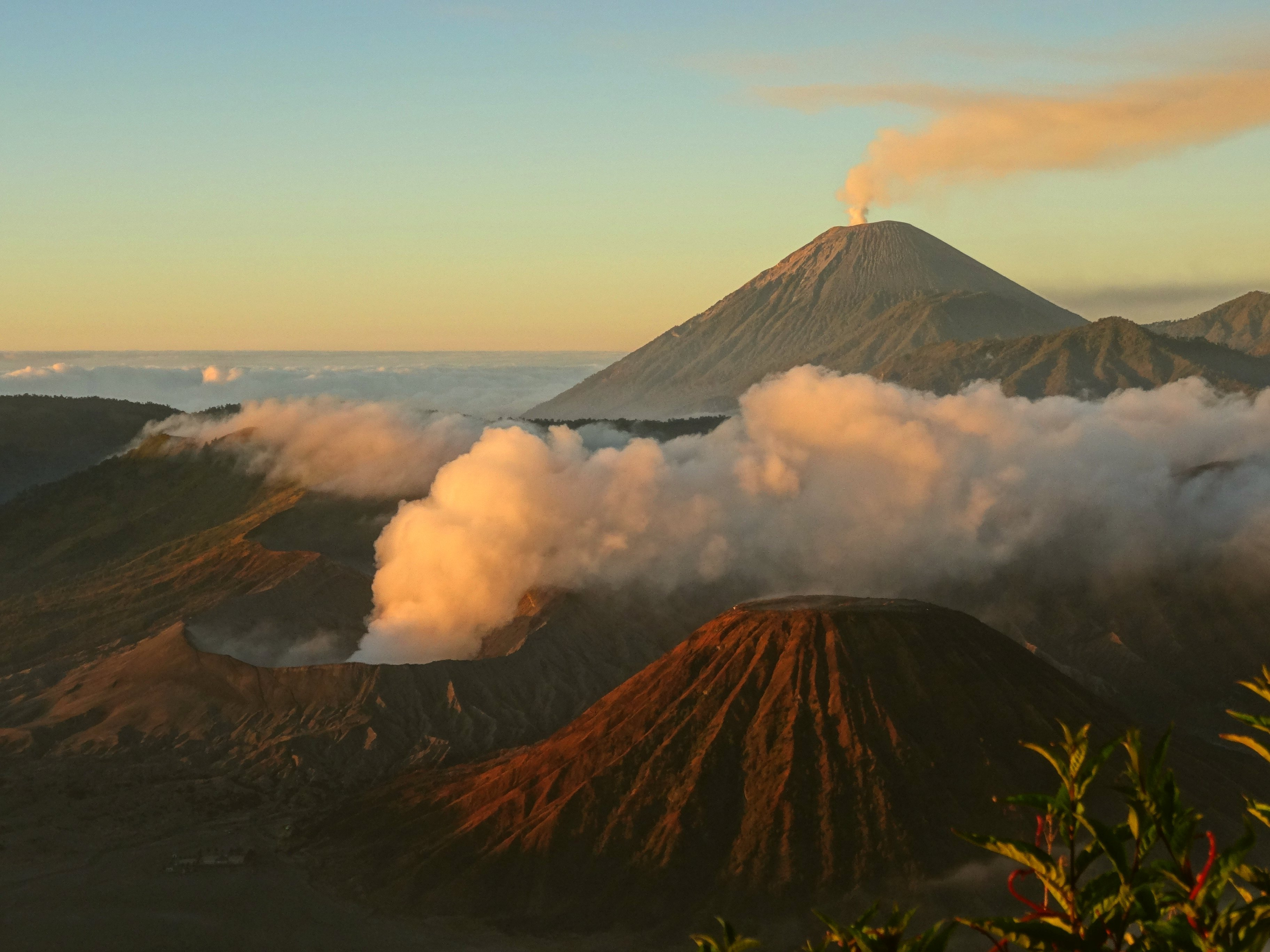
In the Tengger Caldera: Mount Batok in front, next the smoking Mount Bromo, active Mount Semeru on skyline, 2014

== Geology ==
Semeru rises steeply above the coastal plains of eastern Java. Maars containing crater lakes have formed along a line through the volcano's summit. It was formed south of the overlapping Ajek-ajek and Jambangan calderas. The eruptive products are andesitic. Semeru lies at the south end of the Tengger Volcanic Complex.

== Eruptive history ==
Semeru's eruptive history is extensive. Since 1818, at least 61 eruptive periods have been recorded (11 of which resulted in fatalities) consisting of lava and pyroclastic flows. Almost all historical eruptions have had a Volcanic Explosivity Index (VEI) of 2 or 3. Semeru has been in a state of near-constant eruption from 1967 to the present. The volcano's most recent eruption occurred in 2026.

=== 2021 eruption ===
In 2021, Semeru erupted in January, and on 4 and 6 December. The eruption caused 11 km (6.8 mi) high ejections, lava flows for 5–11.5 km (3.1–7.1 mi) and ash rains for 30 km (19 mi).

At least 57 people died, 104 more were injured, while 23 were unaccounted for. More than 10,000 people were displaced, and 1,027 houses, 43 public facilities and two bridges affected.

=== 2022 eruption ===
Monsoon rains in 2022 and 2023 led to the collapse of the lava dome; Semeru erupted again on 4 December 2022 with a pyroclastic flow of 12 km (7.5 mi) length, a pyroclastic earthquake and 13 eruption earthquakes.

=== 2025 eruption ===
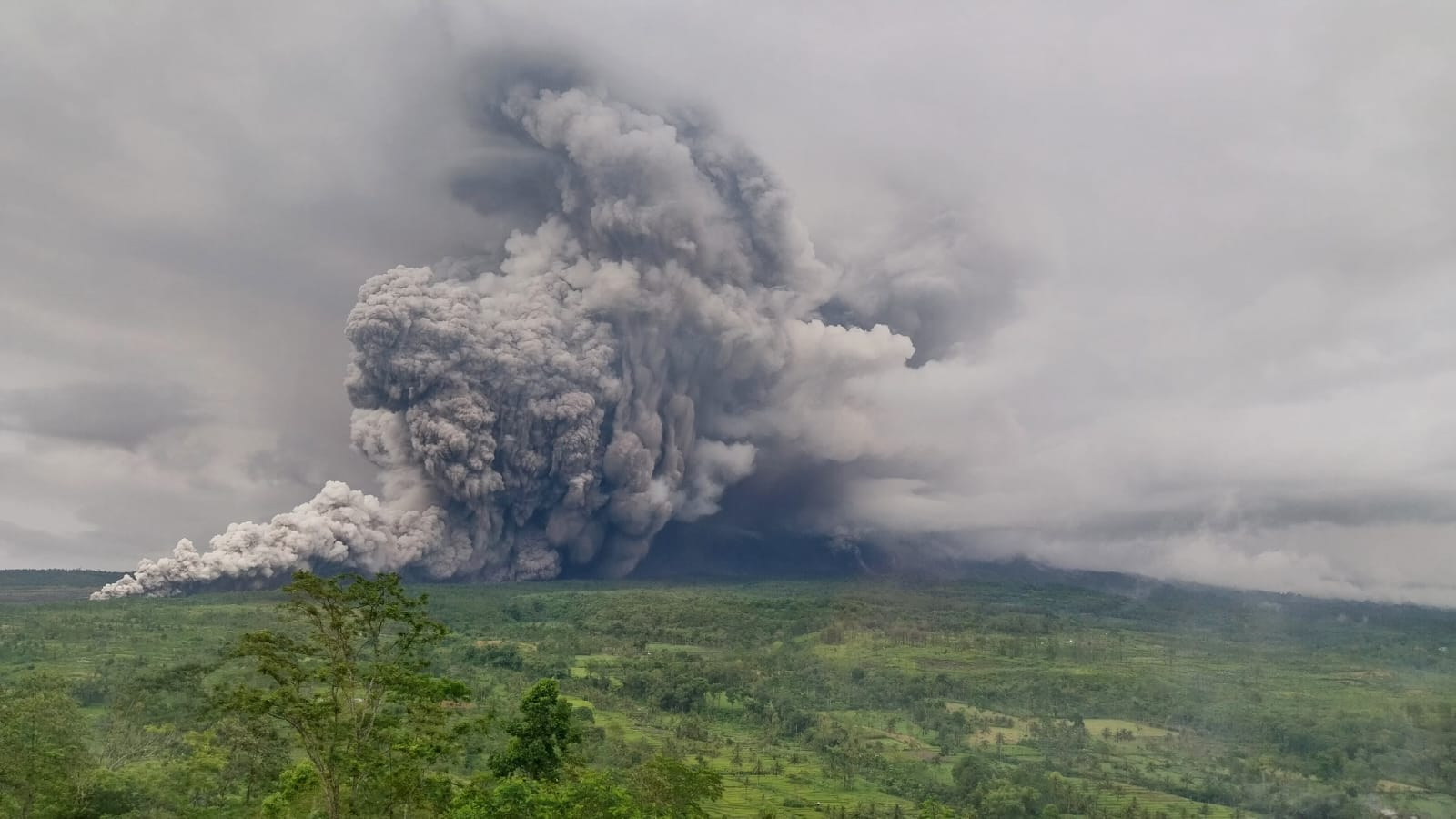
Aerial view Mount Semeru eruption on 19 November 2025

On 19 November 2025, Semeru erupted with a pyroclastic flow over the southern slope that reached 7 km (4.3 mi), along with an ash cloud that reached a height of 2 km (1.2 mi). As of 20 November 2025, three people were injured, 1,156 were displaced, and 200 houses along with one school building were damaged.

== Legends ==
Semeru is named after Sumeru, the central world mountain in Hinduism. As stated in legend, it was transplanted from India to create the island of Java; the tale is recorded in the 15th-century East Javanese work Tantu Pagelaran. It was originally placed in the western part of the island, but that caused the island to tip, so the gods moved it eastward. On that journey, parts kept coming off the lower rim, forming the mountains Lawu, Wilis, Kelud, Kawi, Arjuno and Welirang. The damage thus caused to the foot of the mountain caused it to shake, and the top came off and created Penanggungan as well. Indonesian Hindus also hold a belief that the mountain is the abode of Shiva in Java.

== Floral problems ==
=== Non-native invasive plants ===
25 non-native plants have been found in Mount Semeru National Park. The non-native plants, which threaten the endemic local plants, were imported via many ways in the colonial era. Around 1906–1907, M. Buysman, a Dutch botanical park owner in Nongkojajar in western slope of Tengger Mts., developed a huge collection of introduced plants in his park, which later spread widely to the surrounding areas. They include Foeniculum vulgare, Verbena brasiliensis, Chromolaena odorata, and Salvinia molesta.

=== Vegetable plantations ===
Mud erosion from surrounding vegetable plantations is adding silt to Ranu Pani Lake, causing the lake to gradually shrink. Research has predicted that the lake will disappear by about 2025, unless the vegetable plantations on the hillsides are replaced with more ecologically sustainable perennials.

== See also ==
- List of ultras of the Malay Archipelago
- List of volcanoes in Indonesia
- List of Southeast Asian mountains
- List of islands by highest point
- Volcanological Survey of Indonesia
- Lists of volcanoes
- Argo Semeru

== General sources ==
- "Semeru". Global Volcanism Program. Smithsonian Institution.
- Holt, Claire. Art in Indonesia: Continuities and Change. Ithaca: Cornell University Press, 1967. Page 36 explains the mythological aspect of the mountain.
