= Hinduism in Indonesia =

Hinduism in Indonesia Hinduisme di Indonesia
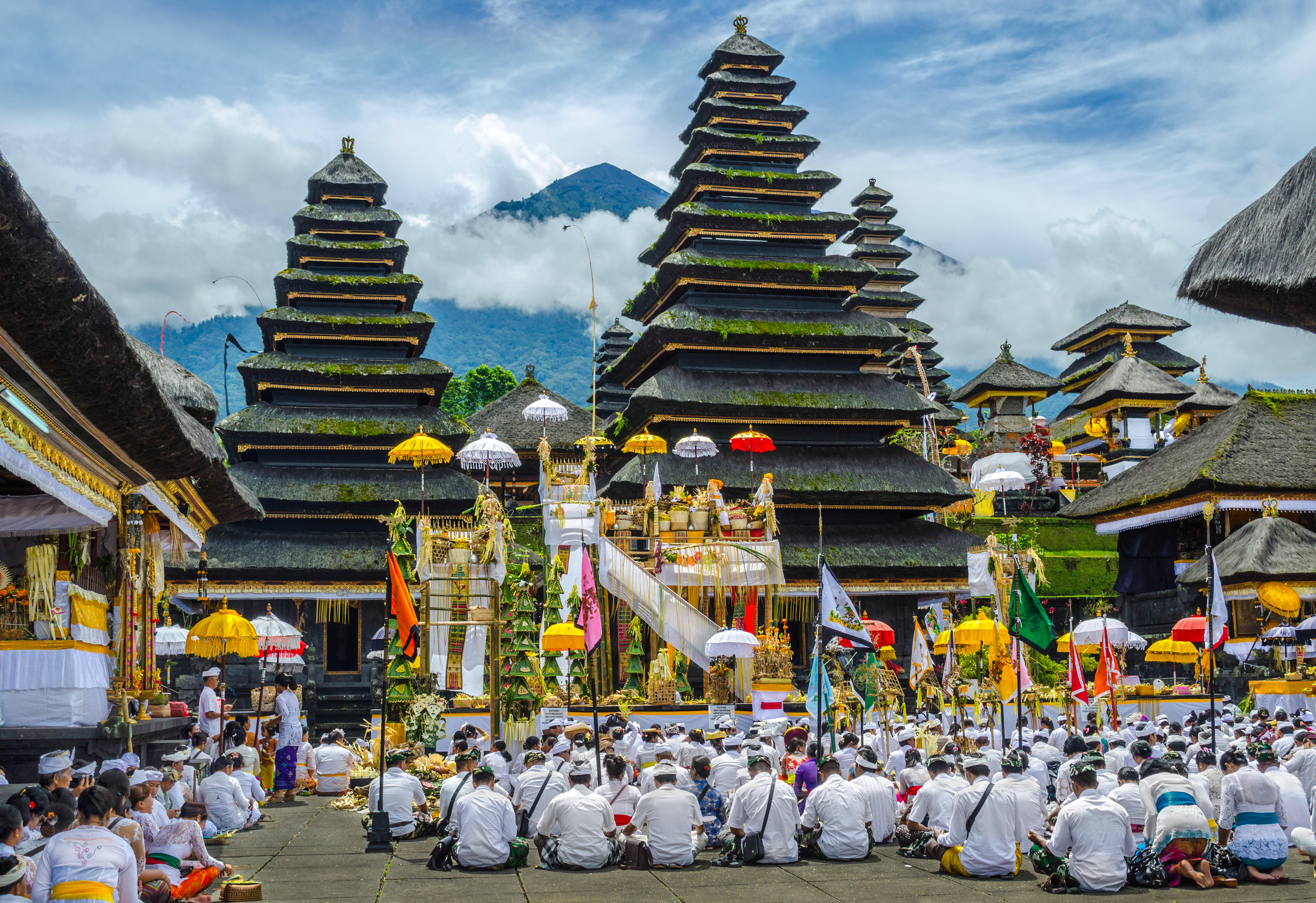
- A puja ceremony at Besakih Temple in Bali, Indonesia.

Total population
- ▲4.781.776 (2025); 1.66% of population

Regions with significant populations
- Bali: 3,682,484
- Central Kalimantan: 155,595
- West Nusa Tenggara: 128,600
- Lampung: 127,903
- Central Sulawesi: 109,308
- East Java: 107,971
- North Sumatra: 88,346

Religions
- Hinduism

Scriptures
- Vedas, Upanishads, Puranas, Itihasa (mainly Ramayana & Mahabharata) and others

Languages
- Sacred; Sanskrit; Spoken Languages; Indonesian (official), Balinese, Javanese, Dayak, Sundanese, Tenggerese, Osing and other Indonesian languages

Hindu distribution in each Indonesian district (2022). the map also included Kaharingan or Sulawesi natives religion which classified as Hindu by the Indonesian government and also show Tenggerese Hindus distribution in East Java.

Hinduism is the third-largest religion in Indonesia, practised by approximately 1.66% of the national population according to 2025 civil registration data from the Ministry of Home Affairs. The vast majority of Indonesian Hindus reside on the island of Bali, where Hinduism is the predominant religion, adhered to by nearly 87 % of the local population. Most Hindus in Indonesia practise Balinese Hinduism, a distinct local tradition shaped by indigenous beliefs and historical Hindu–Buddhist influences.

Hinduism was the dominant religion in much of the Indonesian archipelago prior to the spread of Islam and remains one of the six officially recognised religions of the Indonesian state. Hindu ideas reached Indonesia from around the 1st century CE through trade and cultural exchange with the Indian subcontinent. Over time, these ideas blended with local Austronesian traditions and, from around the 6th century, with Buddhist influences, giving rise to a syncretic form of Hindu–Buddhist religious culture.

This religious synthesis flourished under major pre-Islamic polities such as the Srivijaya and the Majapahit empires. From the 14th century onward, the spread of Islam through coastal trade networks led to a decline of Hinduism across much of Indonesia, though it remained deeply rooted in Bali. In the modern period, Hinduism has also re-emerged in other regions, including parts of Java, through revival movements that draw on Majapahit-era traditions, Shaivism, and Javanese spiritual philosophy.

In addition, several indigenous belief systems and traditional religions outside Bali have been administratively classified as forms of Hinduism in order to meet Indonesian legal requirements for religious recognition, which mandate belief in a supreme deity and formal religious structure. As a result, Indonesia today has one of the largest Hindu populations in the world, despite Hinduism being a minority religion nationally.

== History ==
The indigenous peoples of the Indonesian Archipelago believed in animism and dynamism, practices commonly shared among many tribal peoples around the world. In the case of the first Indonesians, they especially venerated and revered ancestral spirits; they developed a belief that certain individuals’ spiritual energy may inhabit (or be reincarnated in) various natural objects, beings and places, such as animals, insects, trees, plants, stones, forests, mountains, or any place deemed sacred. This unseen spiritual entity and supernatural knowledge is identified by the ancient Javanese, Sundanese and Balinese as "hyang", which can mean either “divine” or “ancestral”. In modern Indonesian, "hyang" tends to be associated with the notion of God.

=== Arrival of Hinduism ===
Hinduism expansion in Asia, from its heartland in the Indian Subcontinent to the rest of Asia, especially Southeast Asia, started circa the 1st century marked with the establishment of early Hindu settlements and polities in Southeast Asia.

Hindu influences reached the Indonesian Archipelago as early as the first century. In tales like the "Kidung Harṣa Wijaya" one reads that "rata bhaṭṭāra Narasingha" supposedly was a scion in the lineage of Hari, and that Hari is another word for "Vishnu". Early translators of Kavi manuscripts misunderstood the "being a son of" and assumed that Vishnu actually had human offspring and so on. Here however one must conclude a belonging to a religious school of thought, Vaisnavism. Therefore, early Hinduism on Java, Bali, and Sumatra consisted of both main schools of Hinduism. Thus, historical evidence is not entirely unclear about the diffusion process of cultural and spiritual ideas from India. Java legends refer to Saka-era, traced to 78 CE. Stories from the Mahabharata Epic have been traced in Indonesian islands to the 1st century; whose versions mirror those found in southeast Indian peninsular region (now Tamil Nadu and southern Andhra Pradesh). The Javanese prose work Tantu Pagelaran of the 14th century, which is a collection of ancient tales, arts and crafts of Indonesia, extensively uses Sanskrit words, Indian deity names and religious concepts. Similarly ancient Chandis (temples) excavated in Java and western Indonesian islands, as well as ancient inscriptions such as the 8th century Canggal inscription discovered in Indonesia, confirm widespread adoption of Shiva lingam iconography, his companion goddess Parvati, Ganesha, Vishnu, Brahma, Arjuna, and other Hindu deities by about the middle to late 1st millennium AD. Ancient Chinese records of Fa Hien on his return voyage from Ceylon to China in 414 AD mention two schools of Hinduism in Java, while Chinese documents from 8th century refer to the Hindu kingdom of King Sanjaya as Holing, calling it "exceedingly wealthy," and that it coexisted peacefully with Buddhist people and Sailendra ruler in Kedu Plain of the Java island.

Archeological evidence suggests Tarumanagara as one of the earliest known Hindu kingdoms in Indonesia. The map shows its geographic spread in West Java in the 5th century CE.

The two major theories for the arrival of Hinduism in Indonesia include that South Indian sea traders brought Hinduism with them, and second being that Indonesian royalty welcomed Indian religions and culture, and it is they who first adopted these spiritual ideas followed by the masses. Indonesian islands adopted both Hindu and Buddhist ideas, fusing them with pre-existing native folk religion and Animist beliefs. In the 4th century, the kingdom of Kutai in East Kalimantan, Tarumanagara in West Java, and Holing (Kalingga) in Central Java, were among the early Hindu states established in the region. Excavations between 1950 and 2005, particularly at the Cibuaya and Batujaya sites, suggests that Tarumanagara revered deity Wisnu (Vishnu) of Hinduism. Ancient Hindu kingdoms of Java built many square temples, named rivers on the island as Gomati and Ganges, and completed major irrigation and infrastructure projects.

The various symbols of Om from different ethnic groups in Indonesia, including Balinese (top), Javanese (middle), and Sundanese (bottom) respectively.

Several notable ancient Indonesian Hindu kingdoms were Mataram, famous for the construction of one of the world's largest Hindu temple complexes - the Prambanan temple, followed by Kediri and Singhasari. Hinduism along with Buddhism spread across the archipelago. Numerous sastras and sutras of Hinduism were translated into the Javanese language, and expressed in art form. Rishi Agastya, for example, is described as the principal figure in the 11th century Javanese text Agastya parva; the text includes puranas, and a mixture of ideas from the Samkhya and Vedanta schools of Hinduism. The Hindu-Buddhist ideas reached the peak of their influence in the 14th century. The last and largest among the Hindu-Buddhist Javanese empires, Majapahit, influenced the Indonesian archipelago.

=== Hinduism in the colonial era ===
Sunni Muslim traders of the Shafi'i fiqh, as well as Sufi Muslim traders from India, Oman and Yemen brought Islam to Indonesia. The earliest known mention of a small Islamic community midst the Hindus of Indonesia is credited to Marco Polo, about 1297 AD, whom he referred to as a new community of Moorish traders in Perlak. Four diverse and contentious Islamic Sultanates emerged in north Sumatra (Aceh), south Sumatra, west and central Java, and in southern Borneo (Kalimantan).

These Sultanates declared Islam as their state religion and fought against each other as well as the Hindus and other non-Muslims. In some regions, Indonesian people continued their old beliefs and adopted a syncretic version of Islam. In other cases, Hindus and Buddhists left and concentrated as communities in islands that they could defend. Hindus of eastern Java, for example, moved to Bali and neighboring small islands. While this era of religious conflict and inter-Sultanate warfare was unfolding, and new power centers were attempting to consolidate regions under their control, European colonialism arrived. The Indonesian archipelago was soon dominated by the Dutch colonial empire. The Dutch colonial empire helped prevent inter-religious conflict, and it slowly began the process of excavating, understanding and preserving Indonesia's ancient Hindu-Buddhist cultural foundations, particularly in Java and western islands of Indonesia.

=== Hinduism in modern era ===
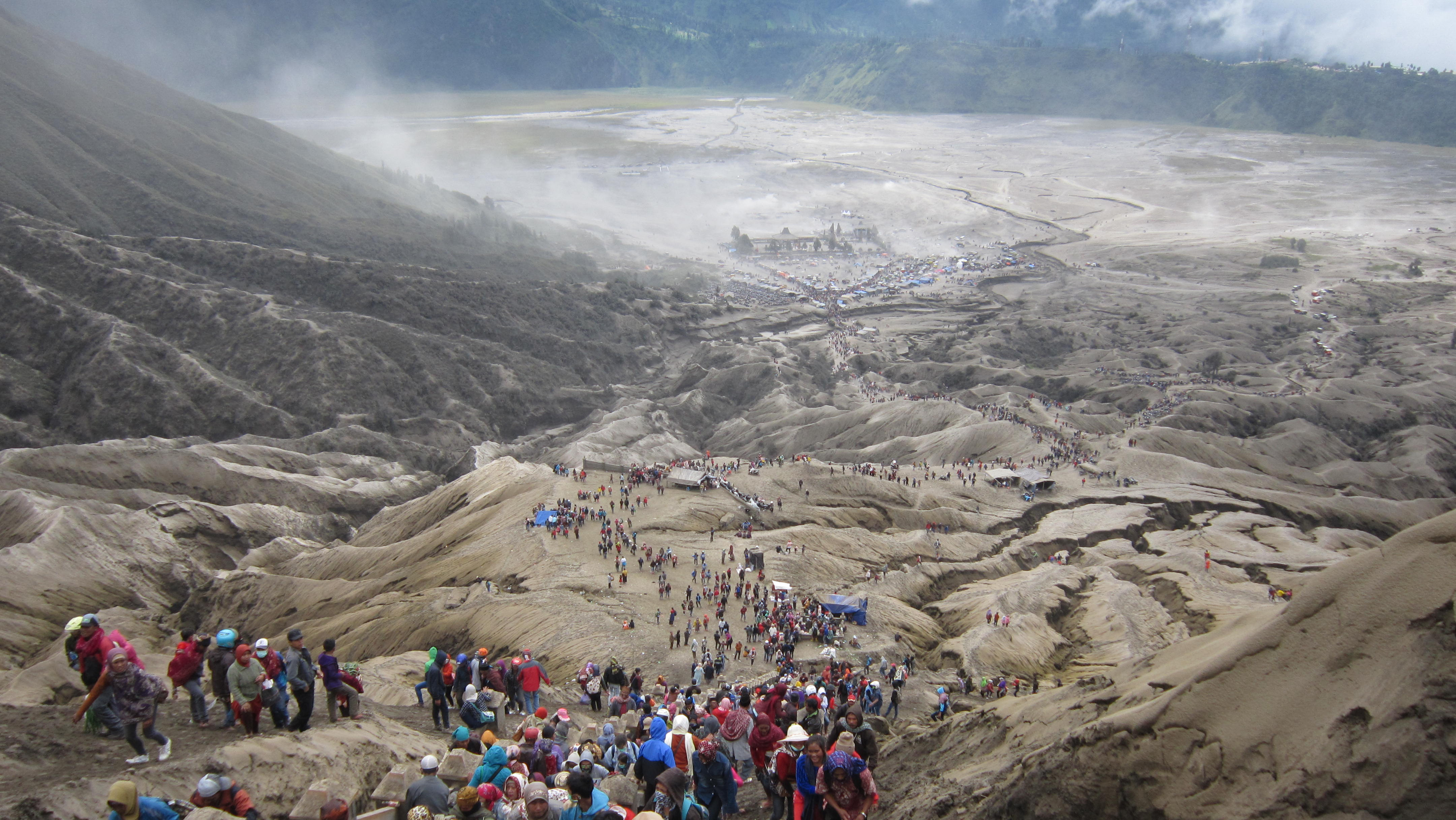
Devotees climbing the trail towards Mount Bromo during Yadnya Kasada.

After Indonesia gained its independence from Dutch colonial rule, it officially recognized only monotheistic religions under pressure from political Islam. Further, Indonesia required an individual to have a religion to gain full Indonesian citizenship rights, and officially Indonesia did not recognize Hindus. It considered Hindus as orang yang belum beragama (people without religion), and as those who must be converted. In 1952, the Indonesian Ministry of Religion declared Bali and other islands with Hindus as needing a systematic campaign of proselytization to accept Islam. The local government of Bali, shocked by this official national policy, declared itself an autonomous religious area in 1953. The Balinese government also reached out to India and former Dutch colonial officials for diplomatic and human rights support. A series of student and cultural exchange initiatives between Bali and India helped formulate the core principles behind Balinese Hinduism (Catur Veda, Upanishad, Puranas, Itihasa). In particular, the political self-determination movement in Bali in mid 1950s led to a non-violent passive resistance movement and the joint petition of 1958 which demanded Indonesian government recognize Hindu Dharma. This joint petition quoted the following Sanskrit mantra from Hindu scriptures,

Om tat sat ekam eva advitiyam

Translation: Om, thus is the essence of the all prevading, infinite, undivided one.

— Joint petition by Hindus of Bali, 14 June 1958

The petition's focus on the "undivided one" was to satisfy the constitutional requirement that Indonesian citizens have a monotheistic belief in one God. The petitioners identified Ida Sanghyang Widhi Wasa as the undivided one. In the Balinese language this term has two meanings: the Divine ruler of the Universe and the Divine Absolute Cosmic Law. This creative phrase met the monotheistic requirement of the Indonesian Ministry of Religion in the former sense, while the latter sense of its meaning preserved the central ideas of dharma in ancient scripts of Hinduism. In 1959, Indonesian President Sukarno supported the petition and a Hindu-Balinese Affairs section was officially established in the Ministry of Religious Affairs under the Djuanda Cabinet.

Indonesian politics and religious affairs went through turmoil from 1959 to 1962, with Sukarno dissolving the Konstituante and weakening the impact of communist movement in Indonesia along with political Islam. Nevertheless, officially identifying their religion as Hinduism was not a legal possibility for Indonesians until 1962, when it became the fifth state-recognized religion. This recognition was initially sought by Balinese religious organizations and granted for the sake of Bali, where the majority were Hindu. Between 1966 and 1980, along with Balinese Hindus, large numbers of Indonesians in western Java, as well as parts of South Sulawesi, North Sumatra, Central and South Kalimantan officially declared themselves to be Hindus. They politically organized themselves to press and preserve their rights. The largest of these organizations, Parisada Hindu Dharma Bali, changed its name to Parisada Hindu Dharma Indonesia (PHDI) in 1986, reflecting subsequent efforts to define Hinduism as a national rather than just a Balinese concern.

While Hindus in Bali, with their large majority, developed and freely practiced their religion, in other islands of Indonesia they suffered discrimination and persecution by local officials as these Hindus were considered as those who had left Islam, the majority religion. However, the central government of Indonesia supported the Hindus. In the 1960s, Hinduism was an umbrella also used by Indonesians whose faith was Buddhism and Confucianism, but when neither of these two were officially recognized. Furthermore, Hindu political activists of Indonesia worked to protect people of those faiths under rights they had gained at the Indonesian Ministry of Religion.

To gain official acceptance and their rights in a Muslim-dominated country, Hinduism in Indonesia was politically forced to adapt. Currently Hindu Dharma is one of the five officially recognized monotheistic religions in Indonesia.

Folk religions and animists with a deep concern for the preservation of their traditional ancestor religions declared their religion to be Hinduism, considering it a more flexible option than Islam or Christianity, in the outer islands. In the early seventies, the Toraja people of Sulawesi were the first to realize this opportunity by seeking shelter for their indigenous ancestor religion under the broad umbrella of 'Hinduism', followed by the Karo Batak of Sumatra in 1977. In central and southern Kalimantan, a large Hindu movement has grown among the local indigenous Dayak population which lead to a mass declaration of 'Hinduism' on this island in 1980. However, this was different from the Javanese case, in that conversions followed a clear ethnic division. Indigenous Dayak were confronted with a mostly population of government-sponsored (and predominantly Madurese) migrants and officials, and deeply resentful at the dispossession of their land and its natural resources.

Compared to their counterparts among Javanese Hindus, many Dayak leaders were also more deeply concerned about Balinese efforts to standardize Hindu ritual practice nationally; fearing a decline of their own unique 'Hindu Kaharingan' traditions and renewed external domination. By contrast, most Javanese were slow to consider Hinduism at the time, lacking a distinct organization along ethnic lines and fearing retribution from locally powerful Islamic organizations like the Nahdatul Ulama (NU).

Several native tribal peoples with beliefs such as Sundanese Sunda Wiwitan, Buginese Tolotang, Torajan Aluk Todolo, Tenggerese Budho, and Batak Malim, with their own unique syncretic faith, have declared themselves as Hindus in order to comply with Indonesian law, while preserving their distinct traditions with differences from mainstream Indonesian Hinduism dominated by the Balinese. These factors and political activity has led to a certain resurgence of Hinduism outside of its Balinese stronghold.

In February 2020, President Joko Widodo issued a presidential regulation elevating the status of Hindu Dharma State Institute in Denpasar, Bali into the country's first Hindu state university, named I Gusti Bagus Sugriwa State Hindu University. This institution of Hindu higher study started out as a state academy for teachers of Hindu religion in 1993, before being converted into the Hindu Religion State College in 1999, and then into the Hindu Dharma State Institute in 2004. Indonesia also recently established a form of formal Hindu-based school in the form of widyalaya.

== General beliefs and practices ==
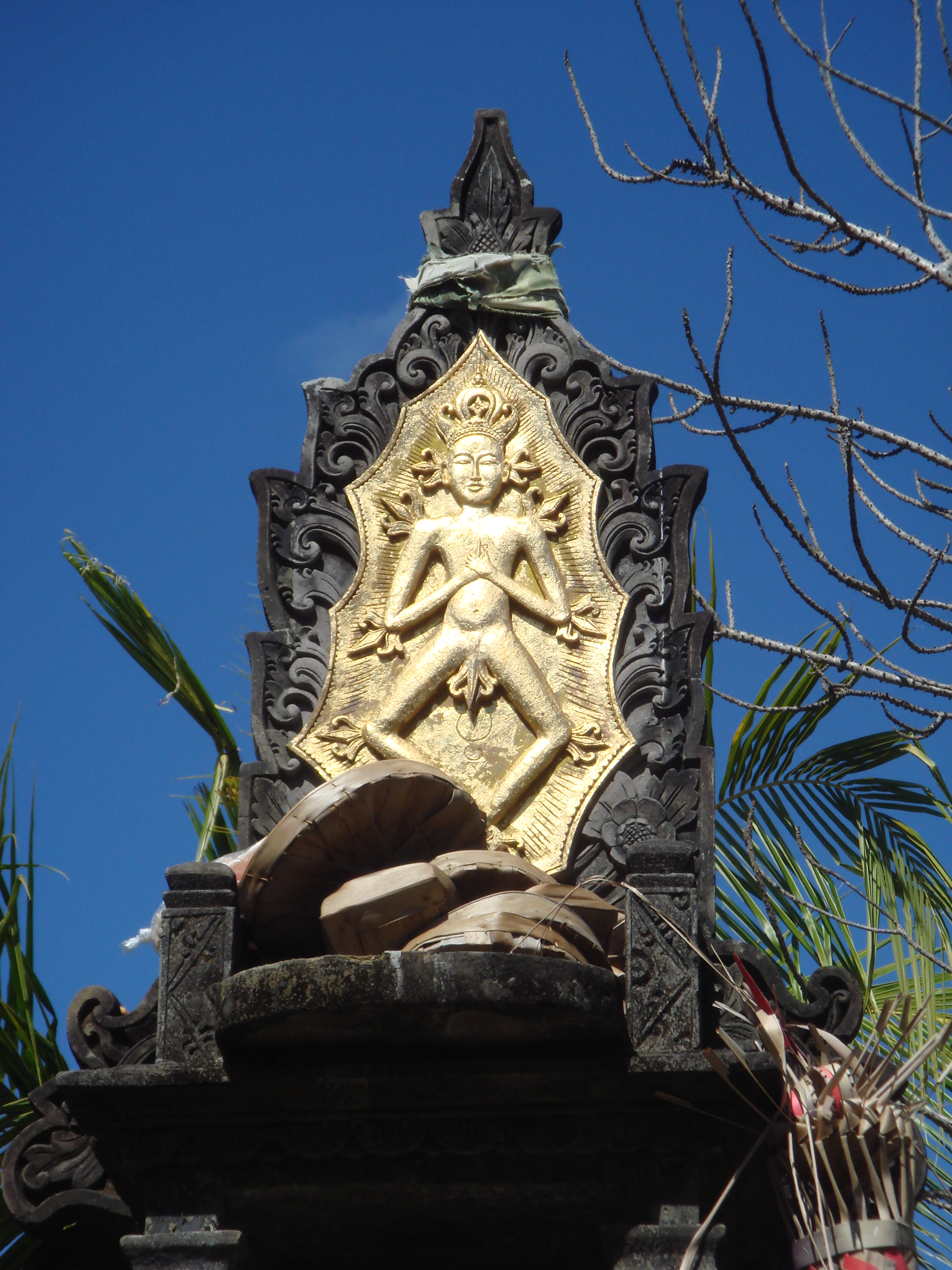
Acintya is the Supreme God in Balinese Hinduism.

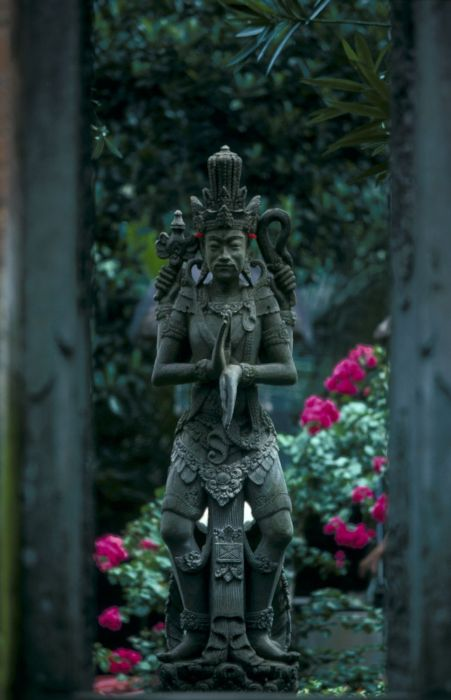
Sculpture of "Batara Guru", an aspect of Shiva in Indonesian Hinduism.

The general beliefs and practices of Agama Hindu Dharma are a mixture of ancient traditions and contemporary pressures placed by Indonesian laws that permit only monotheist belief under the national ideology of pancasila. Traditionally, Hinduism in Indonesia had a pantheon of deities and that tradition of belief continues in practice; further, Hinduism in Indonesia granted freedom and flexibility to Hindus as to when, how and where to pray. However, officially, Indonesian government considers and advertises Indonesian Hinduism as a monotheistic religion with certain officially recognized beliefs that comply with its national ideology. Indonesian school text books describe Hinduism as having one supreme being, Hindus offering three daily mandatory prayers, and Hinduism as having certain common beliefs that in part parallel those of Islam. Scholars contest whether these Indonesian government recognized and assigned beliefs reflect the traditional beliefs and practices of Hindus in Indonesia before Indonesia gained independence from Dutch colonial rule.

Some of these officially recognized Hindu beliefs include:

- A belief in one supreme being called 'Ida Sanghyang Widi Wasa', 'Sang Hyang Tunggal', or 'Sang Hyang Acintya'. God Almighty in the Torajanese culture of Central Sulawesi is known as "Puang Matua" in Aluk To Dolo belief.
- A belief in the Trimurti, consisting of:
  - Brahma, the creator.
  - Wisnu or Vishnu, the preserver.
  - Çiwa or Shiva, the destroyer.
- A belief in all of the other Hindu gods and goddesses (Hyang, Dewata and Batara-Batari).

The sacred texts found in Agama Hindu Dharma are the Vedas and Upanishads. They are the basis of Indian and Balinese Hinduism. Other sources of religious information include the Universal Hindu Puranas and the Itihasa (mainly Ramayana and the Mahabharata). The epics Mahabharata and Ramayana became enduring traditions among Indonesian believers, expressed in shadow puppet (wayang) and dance performances. As in India, Indonesian Hinduism recognizes four paths of spirituality, calling it Catur Marga. These are bhakti mārga (path of devotion to deities), jnana mārga (path of knowledge), karma mārga (path of works) and raja mārga (path of meditation). Bhakti marga has the largest following in Bali. Similarly, like Hindus in India, Balinese Hindus believe that there are four proper goals of human life, calling it Catur Purusartha - dharma (pursuit of moral and ethical living), artha (pursuit of wealth and creative activity), kama (pursuit of joy and love) and moksha (pursuit of self-knowledge and liberation).

== Forms of Hinduism ==
=== Balinese Hinduism ===
Balinese Hinduism is the major form of Hinduism practices in Indonesia. It is an amalgamation of Indian religions and indigenous animist customs that existed in Indonesian archipelago before the arrival of Islam and later Dutch colonialism. It integrates many of the core beliefs of Hinduism with arts and rituals of Balinese people. In contemporary times, Hinduism in Bali is officially referred by Indonesian Ministry of Religion as Agama Hindu Dharma, but traditionally the religion was called by many names such as Tirta, Trimurti, Hindu, Agama Tirta, Siwa, Buda, and Siwa-Buda. The terms Tirta and Trimurti emanate from Indian Hinduism, corresponding to Tirtha (pilgrimage to spirituality near holy waters) and Trimurti (Brahma, Vishnu and Shiva) respectively. As in India, Hinduism in Bali grew with flexibility, featuring a diverse way of life. It includes many of the Indian spiritual ideas, cherishes legends and myths of Indian Puranas and Hindu Epics, as well as expresses its traditions through unique set of festivals and customs associated with a myriad of hyangs - the local and ancestral spirits, as well as forms of animal sacrifice that are not common in India.

==== Balinese Hindu temple ====
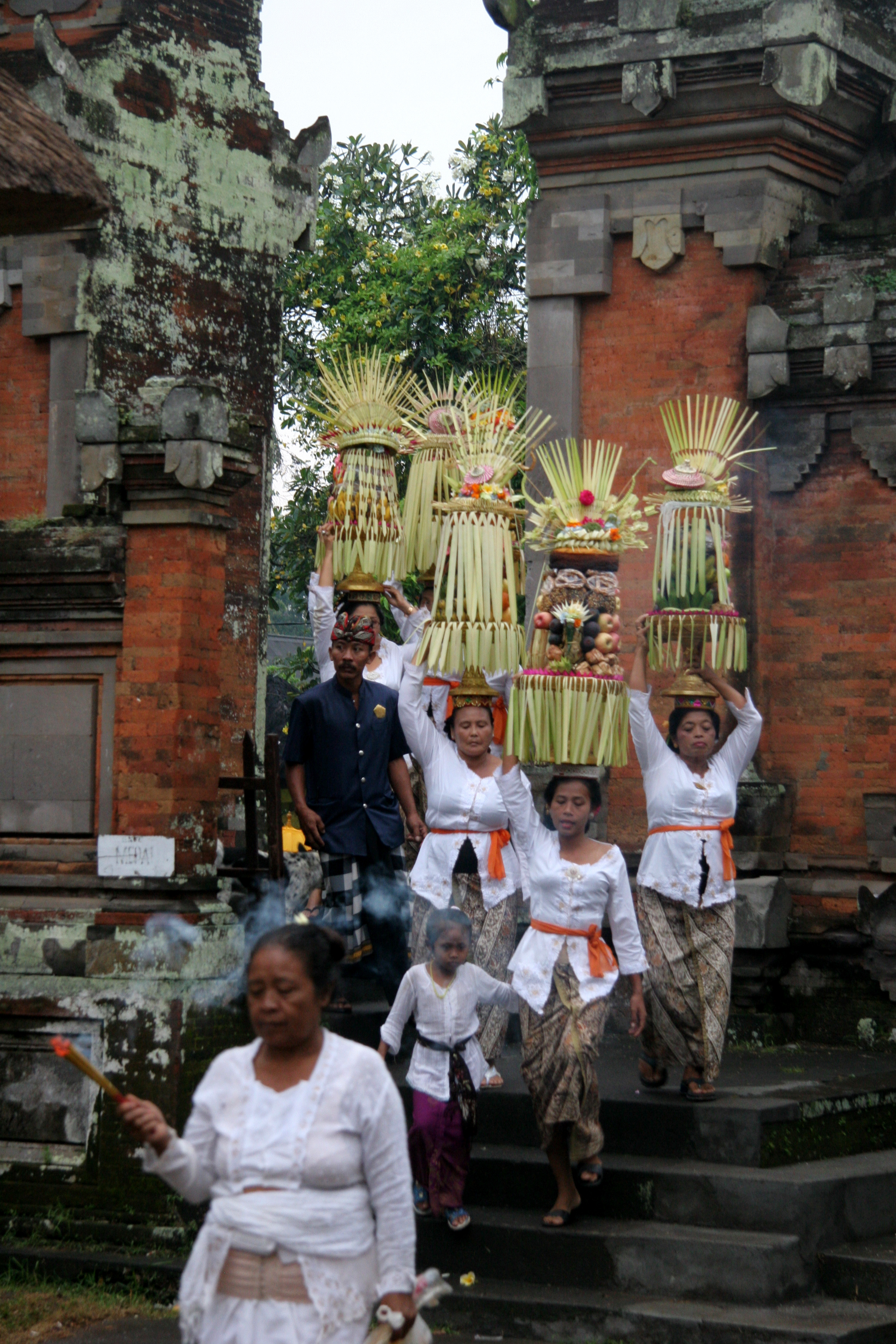
The Hindu Balinese temple offering in Bali

The Balinese temple is called Pura. These temples are designed on a square Hindu temple plan, as an open air worship place within enclosed walls, connected with series of intricately decorated gates to reach its compounds. Each of these temples has a more or less fixed membership; every Balinese belongs to a temple by virtue of descent, residence, or affiliation. Some house temples are associated with the family house compound (also called banjar in Bali), others are associated with rice fields, and still others with key geographic sites. In rural highlands of Bali, banua (or wanwa, forest domain) temples in each desa (village) are common. The island of Bali has over 20,000 temples, or about one temple for every 100 to 200 people. Temples are dedicated to local spirits as well as to deities found in India; for example, Saraswati, Ganesha, Wisnu, Siwa, Parvati, Arjuna, and others. The temple design similarly amalgamate architectural principles in Hindu temples of India and regional ideas.

Each individual has a family deity, called Kula dewa, who resides in the temple called the family temple that the individual and his family patronize. Balinese Hindu follow a 210-day calendar (based on rice crop and lunar cycles), and each temple celebrates its anniversary once every 210 days (the calendar is known as Pawukon calendar). Unique rituals and festivals of Balinese Hindus, that are not found in India, include those related to death of a loved one followed by cremations, cockfights, tooth filings, Nyepi and Galungan. Each temple anniversary, as well as festivals and family events such as wedding include flowers, offerings, towering bamboos with decoration at the end and a procession. These are celebrated by the community with prayers and feast. Most festivals have a temple as venue, and they are often occasions for prayers, celebration of arts and community. Some traditions, in contrast, involve animist rituals such as caru (animal blood sacrifice) such as Tabuh Rah (lethal cockfighting) or killing of an animal to appease buta kala (spirits of the earth) - however, the animal sacrifices are conducted outside the premises of a temple.

==== Balinese Hindu art ====
Dance, music, colorful ceremonial dresses and other arts are a notable feature of religious expression among Balinese Hindus. As in India, these expressions celebrate various mudra to express ideas, grace, decorum and culture. Dance-drama is common. Various stories are expressed. For example, one involves a battle between the mythical characters Rangda the witch (representing adharma, something like disorder) and Barong the protective spirit represented with a lion mask (representing dharma), in which performers fall into a trance, the good attempts to conquer evil, the dancers express the idea that good and evil exists within each individual, and that conquering evil implies ejecting evil from oneself. Balinese paintings are notable for their highly vigorous yet refined, intricate art that resembles baroque folk art with tropical themes. The dance-drama regularly ends undecided, neither side winning, because the primary purpose is to restore balance and recognize that the battle between dharma and adharma (good and evil) is within each person and a never ending one. Barong, or dharma, is a major symbolic and ritual paradigm found in various festivities, dances, arts and temples.

Rituals of the life cycle are also important occasions for religious expression and artistic display. Ceremonies at puberty, marriage, and, most notably, cremation at death provide opportunities for Balinese to communicate their ideas about community, status, and the afterlife.

==== Balinese Hindu society ====
Scholars dispute the degree and nature of social stratification in medieval and contemporary Balinese Hindu society. The social structure consisted of catur wangsa (four varnas) - brahmana (priests), satriya or "Deva" (warriors), waisya (merchants), and sudra (farmers, artisans, commoners). There is no historical or contemporary cultural record of untouchables in Balinese Hindu society. The wangsa - termed castes by some accounts, classes by other accounts - were functional, not hierarchical nor segregated in Hindu society of Bali or Java. Further, there was social mobility - people could change their occupation and caste if they wished to. Among the interior highlands of Bali, the desa (villages) have had no wangsa, the social status and profession of a person has been mutable, and marriages not endogamous. Historical inscriptions suggest Balinese Hindu kings and village chiefs have come from all sections of its society - priests, warriors, merchants and artisans.

=== Hinduism in Java ===
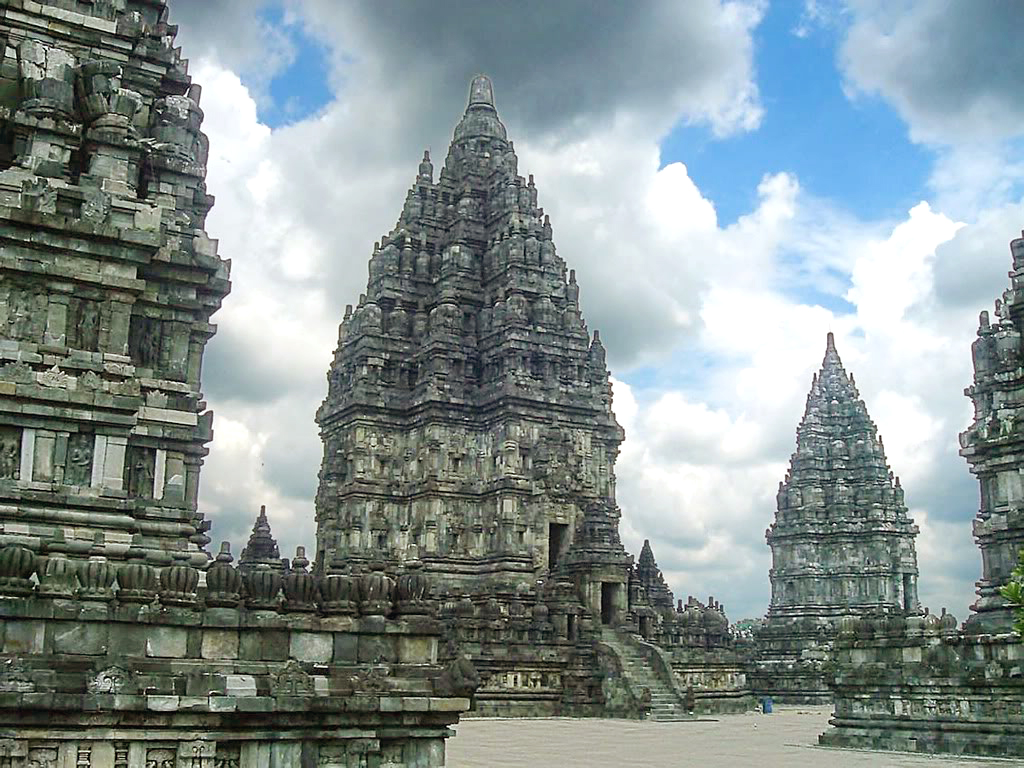
The 9th century Prambanan Shiva temple, the largest Hindu temple in Indonesia.

Both Java and Sumatra were subject to considerable cultural influence from the Indian subcontinent. The earliest evidences of Hindu influences in Java can be found in 4th century Tarumanagara inscriptions scattered around modern Jakarta and Bogor. In the sixth and seventh centuries many maritime kingdoms arose in Sumatra and Java which controlled the waters in the Straits of Malacca and flourished with the increasing sea trade between China and India and beyond. During this time, scholars from India and China visited these kingdoms to translate literary and religious texts.

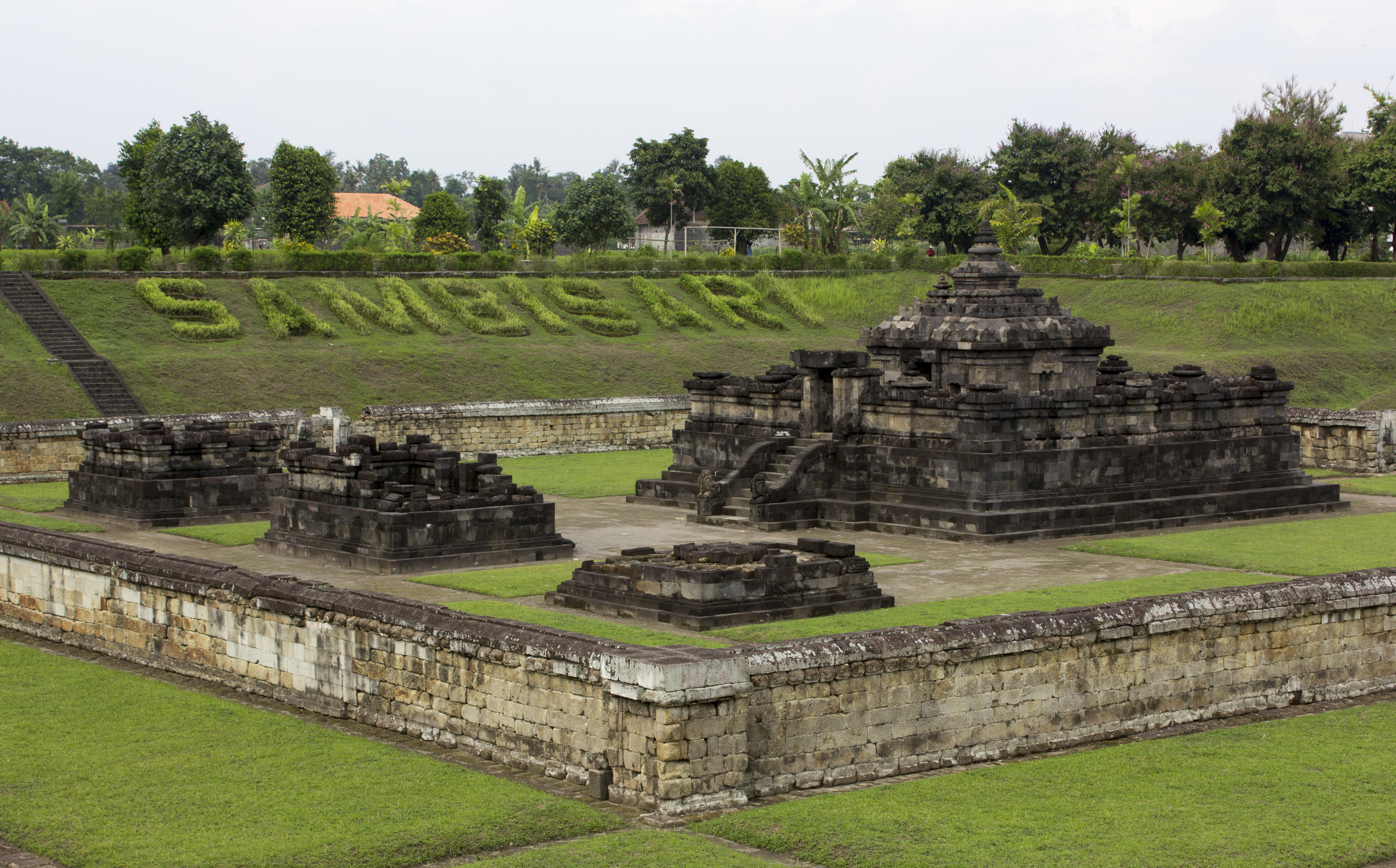
Java's Hindu temple, Candi Sambisari.

From the 4th to the 15th century, Java had many Hindu kingdoms, such as Tarumanagara, Kalingga, Mataram, Kediri, Sunda, Singhasari and Majapahit. This era is popularly known as the Javanese Classical Era, during which Hindu-Buddhist literature, art and architecture flourished and were incorporated into local culture under royal patronage. During this time, many Hindu temples were built, including 9th century Prambanan near Yogyakarta, which has been designated a World Heritage Site. Among these Hindu kingdoms, Majapahit kingdom was the largest and the last significant Hindu kingdom in Indonesian history. Majapahit was based in East Java, from where it ruled a large part of what is now Indonesia. The remnants of the Majapahit kingdom shifted to Bali during the sixteenth century after a prolonged war by and territorial losses to Islamic sultanates.

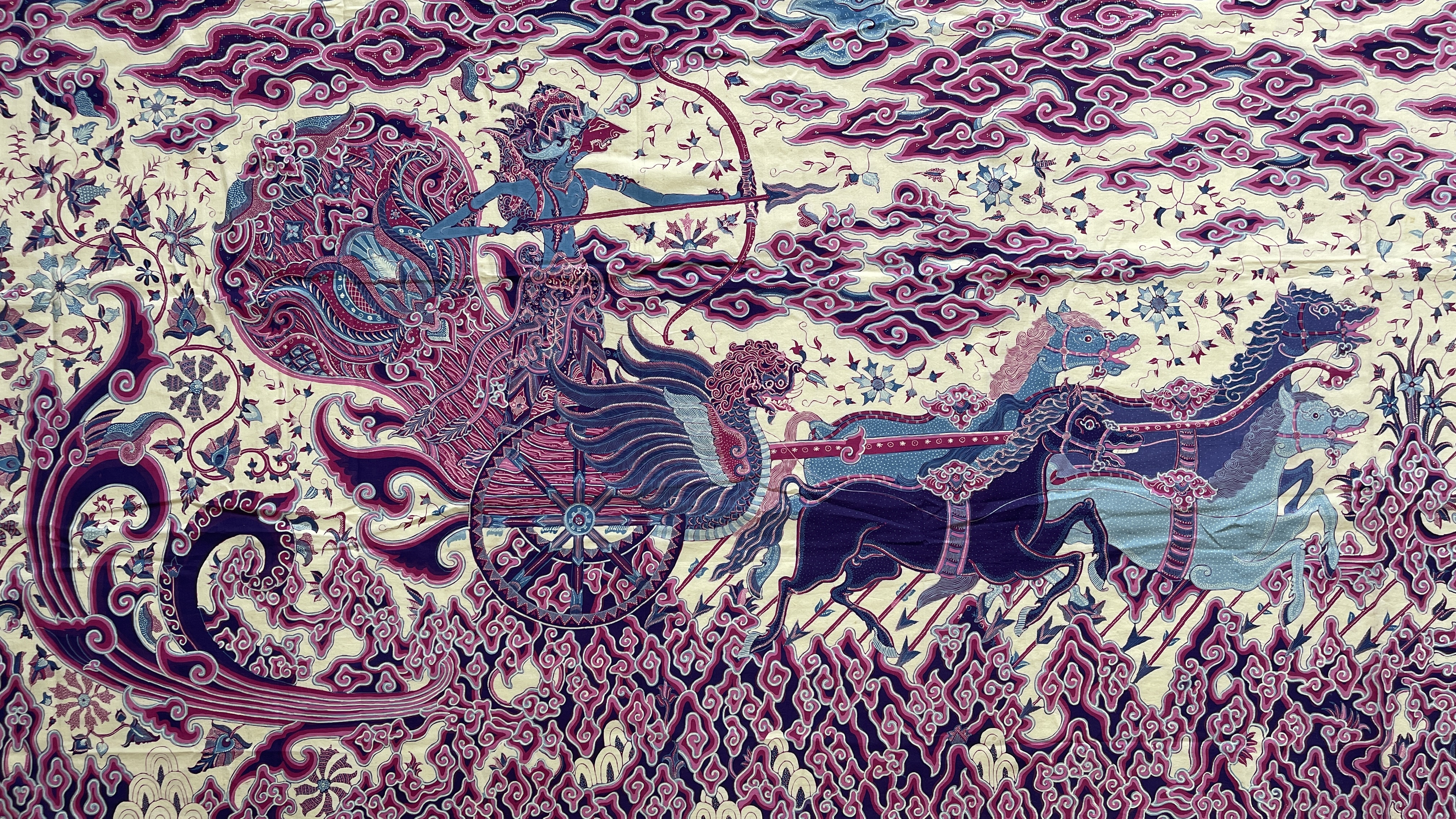
Cirebonese Batik Art depicting Hindu legend Arjun in his chariot in Mahabharat

The heritage of Hinduism left a significant impact and imprint in Javanese and Sundanese art and culture. The wayang puppet performance as well as wayang wong dance and other Javanese and Sundanese classical dances are derived from episodes of Hindu epics Ramayana and Mahabharata. Although the vast majority of Javanese and Sundanese now identify as Muslim, these art forms still survive. Hinduism has survived in varying degrees and forms on Java. Certain ethnic groups in Java, such as the Tenggerese and Osing, are also associated with Hindu religious traditions.

==== Tengger Hindus of Java ====
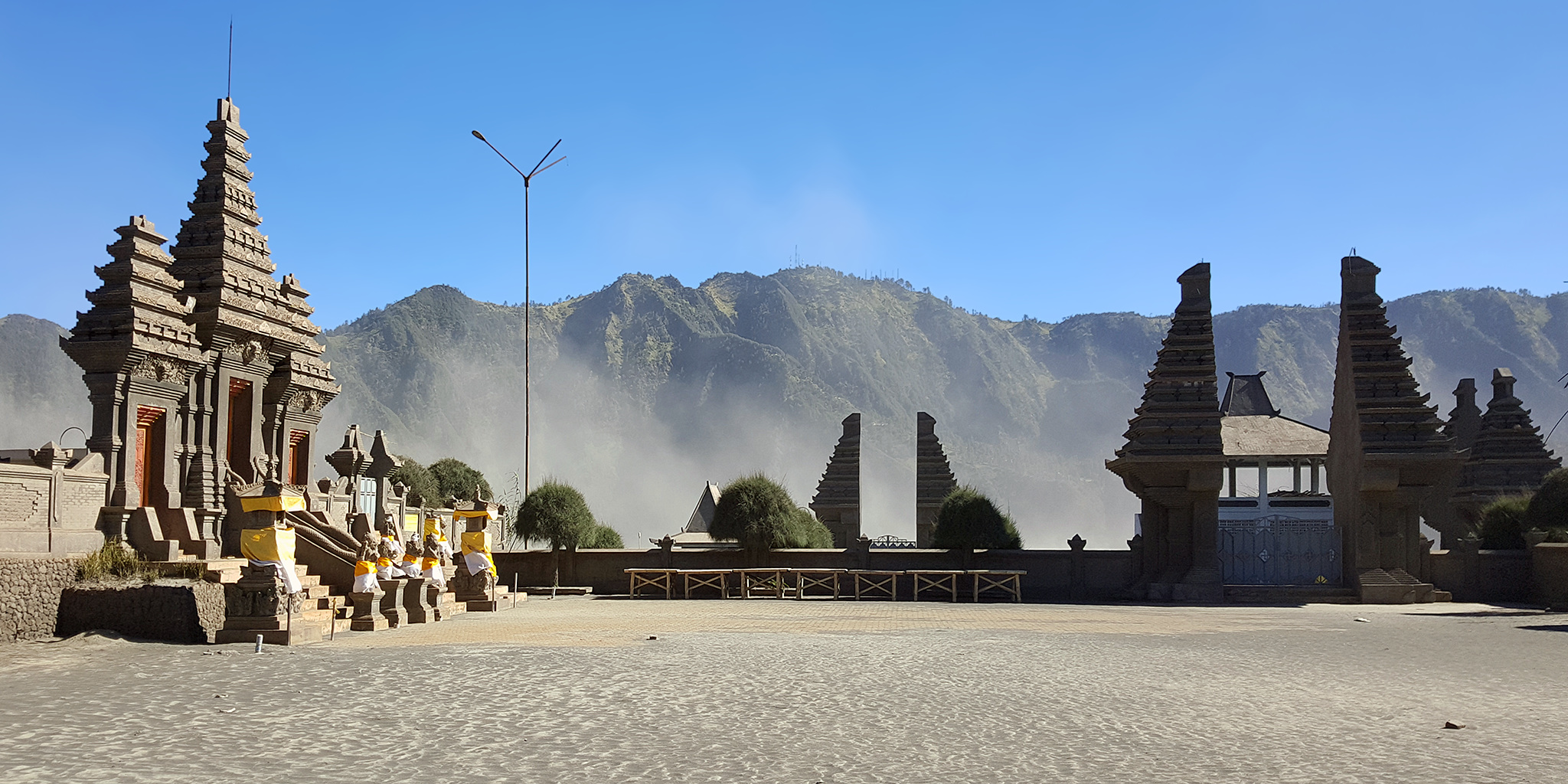
Pura Luhur Poten in Mount Bromo

The Tengger community follows a Hindu tradition stretching back to the Majapahit Empire. There are strong similarities between the Hinduism in Bali and the Tengger variety; both are called Hindu Dharma. However, the Tengger variety does not have a caste system and the Tengger people's traditions are based on those originating from the Majapahit era. For the Tengger, Mount Bromo (Brahma) is believed to be a holy mountain. Every year the Tengger hold a ritual known as Yadnya Kasada.

==== Osing Hindus of Java ====
In spite of the Dutch attempts to propagate Islam and Christianity among the Osings, some of them still follow their old beliefs. Today Hinduism still exists among the Osing population. The Osings share a similar culture and spirit with the Balinese, and the Hindus celebrate ceremonies like Nyepi. Just like the Balinese people, the Osing people also share the puputan tradition. The Osing people differs from the Balinese people in terms of social stratification. Unlike the Balinese, the Osing people do not practice the caste system, even though they are Hindus.

=== Hinduism elsewhere in the archipelago ===
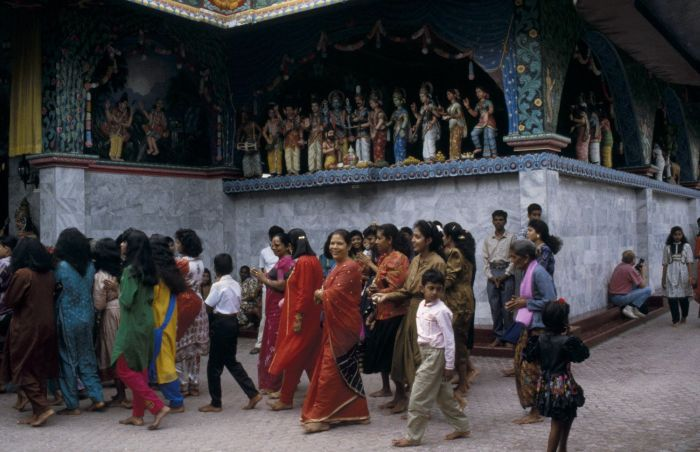
Tamil Hindus walking around the Sri Mariamman Temple, in Medan

Among the non-Balinese communities considered to be Hindu by the government are, for example, the Dayak adherents of the Kaharingan religion in Kalimantan Tengah, where government statistics counted Hindus as 15.8% of the population as of 1995. Many Manusela and Nuaulu people of Seram follow Naurus, a syncretism of Hinduism with animist and Protestant elements. Similarly, the Bugis and Torajans of Sulawesi have identified their animistic religions Tolotang and Aluk To Dolo (Hindu Alukta) as Hindu. The Batak of Sumatra have identified their animist traditions with Hinduism. Among the minority Indian ethnic group, Tamils, Malayalis and Telugus in Medan, North Sumatra and the Sindhis and Gujaratis in Jakarta practice their own form of Hinduism which is similar to the Indian Hinduism, the Indians celebrating Hindu holidays more commonly found in India, such as Deepavali, Holi and Thaipusam. The Bodha sect of Sasak people on the island of Lombok are non-Muslim; their religion is a fusion of Hinduism and Buddhism with animism; it is considered Buddhist by the government. In parts of Lombok, Sulawesi and Borneo especially Samarinda, Nyepi is celebrated.

A majority of the population on the small island of Tanimbar Kei practices a variant of the Hindu religion, which involves a form of ancestral worship. The island of Tanimbar Kei is not part of Tanimbar, as the name might suggest, but is one of the Kai Islands. As of 2014, it is inhabited by ca. 600 people.

== Demographics ==
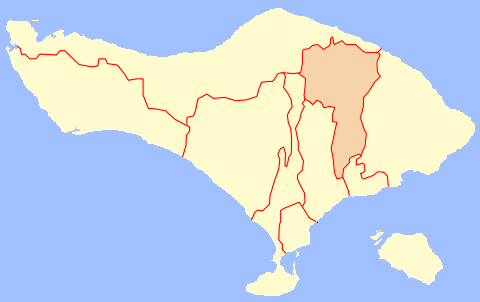
Map of Bangli Regency, the most Hindu Regency in Indonesia, with 98.73% of the population being Hindu

The 2018 civil registration recorded the number of Hindus at 4,646,357 with some 90% of them residing in the Hindu heartland of Bali.

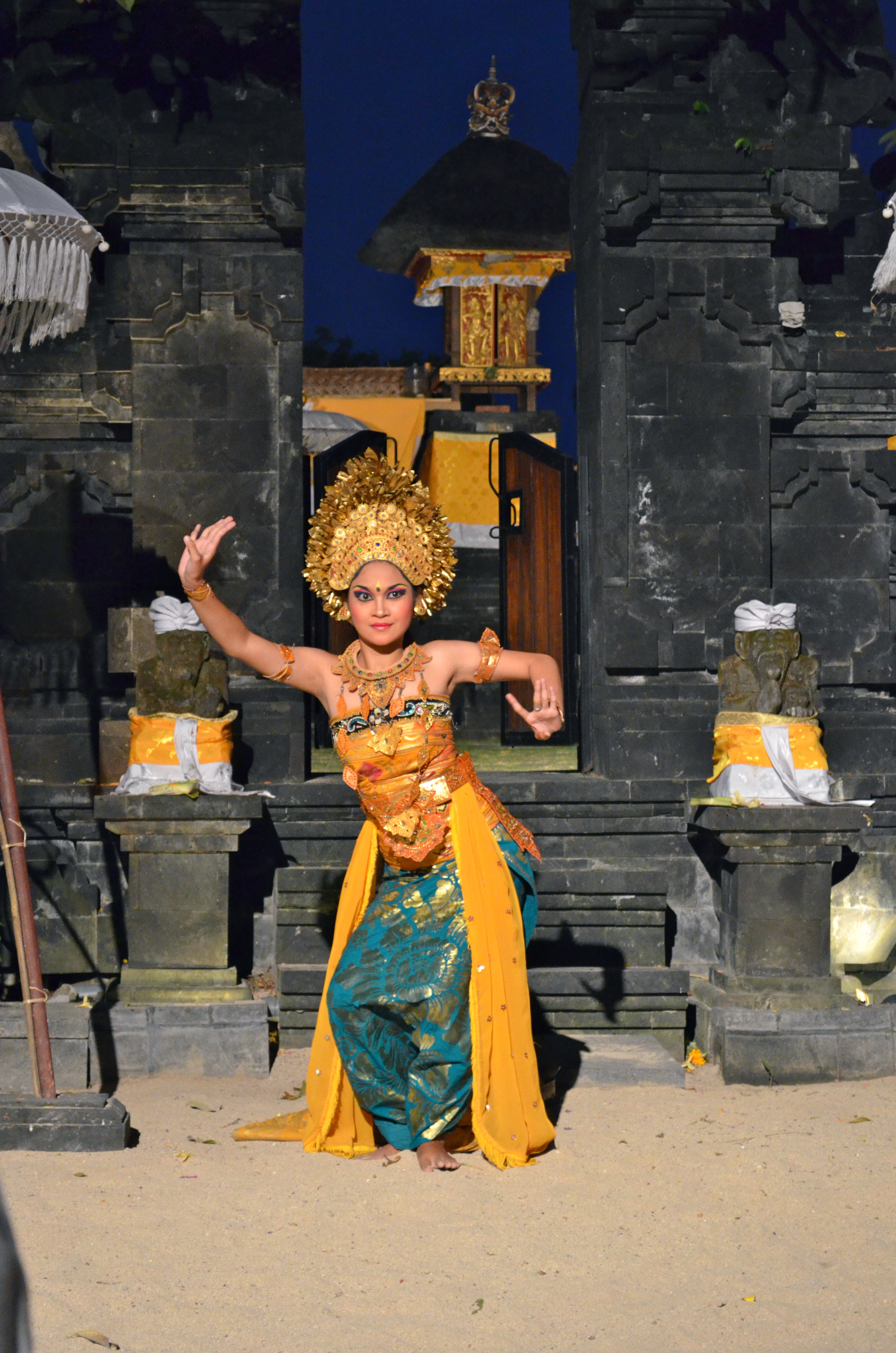
Balinese pura (Hindu temple) dance

Outside Bali, Hindus form a majority in Tosari district (66.3%) in Pasuruan Regency in Java, Balinggi district (77.3%) of Parigi Moutong Regency in Central Sulawesi, Mappak (50%) in Tana Toraja Regency in South Sulawesi. Significant Hindu population is also found in Torue (41%) and Sausu (30%) districts in Parigi Moutong; Tomoni Timur (35%), Angkona (27%), Simbuang (36%) and Tellulimpo E (40%) districts in South Sulawesi; and Cakranegara district (39%) in Mataram (14%) in Lombok.

=== Historical population ===
Year	Percentage	Change (in %age)	Ref
1971	1.94%	–	
1980	2.01%	+0.07	
1985	1.94%	-0.07	
1990	1.83%	-0.11	
2000	1.81%	-0.02	
2005	1.73%	-0.08	
2010	1.69%	-0.04	
2024	1.68%	-0.01	

=== Population by provinces ===
According to the 2010 Census, there were a total of 4,012,116 Hindus in Indonesia, compared to 3,527,758 Hindus in 2000 Census. While the absolute number of Hindus increased, the relative percentage of Hindus in Indonesia decreased from 2000 to 2010 because of lower birth rates among the Hindu population compared to the Muslim population. The average number of births per Hindu woman varied between 1.8 and 2.0 among various islands, while for the Muslim population it varied between 2.1 and 3.2 per woman.

Province	Total	Hindus	Percentage of Hindus		Change
Province	Total	Hindus	2010	2000	Change
Indonesia	237,641,326	4,012,116	1.69%	1.79%	
Aceh	4,494,410	136	0.00%	0.01%	-0.01%
North Sumatera	12,982,204	80,644	0.65%	0.57%	0.08%
West Sumatera	4,846,909	234	0.00%	0.00%	0.00%
Riau	5,538,367	1,076	0.02%	0.09%	-0.07%
Jambi	3,092,265	582	0.02%	0.02%	0.00%
South Sumatera	7,450,394	39,206	0.53%	0.26%	0.27%
Bengkulu	1,715,518	3,727	0.22%	0.15%	0.07%
Lampung	7,608,405	113,512	1.49%	1.44%	0.05%
Bangka Belitung Islands	1,223,296	1,040	0.09%	0.01%	0.08%
Riau Islands	1,679,163	1,541	0.09%	0.37%	-0.28%
Jakarta	9,607,787	20,364	0.21%	0.23%	-0.02%
West Java	43,053,732	19,481	0.05%	0.02%	0.03%
Central Java	32,382,657	17,448	0.05%	0.09%	-0.04%
Special Region of Yogyakarta	3,457,491	5,257	0.15%	0.09%	0.06%
East Java	37,476,757	112,177	0.30%	0.27%	0.03%
Banten	10,632,166	8,189	0.08%	0.07%	0.01%
Bali	3,890,757	3,247,283	83.46%	88.05%	-4.59%
West Nusa Tenggara	4,500,212	118,083	2.62%	3.03%	-0.41%
East Nusa Tenggara	4,683,827	5,210	0.11%	0.15%	-0.04%
West Kalimantan	4,395,983	2,708	0.06%	0.08%	-0.02%
Central Kalimantan	2,212,089	11,149	0.50%	5.89%	-5.39%
South Kalimantan	3,626,616	16,064	0.44%	0.21%	0.23%
East Kalimantan	3,553,143	7,657	0.22%	0.13%	0.09%
North Sulawesi	2,270,596	13,133	0.58%	0.56%	0.02%
Central Sulawesi	2,635,009	99,579	3.78%	4.84%	-1.06%
South Sulawesi	8,034,776	58,393	0.73%	1.13%	-0.40%
Southeast Sulawesi	2,232,586	45,441	2.04%	2.97%	-0.93%
Gorontalo	1,040,164	3,612	0.35%	0.00%	0.35%
West Sulawesi	1,158,651	16,042	1.38%	1.88%	-0.50%
Maluku	1,533,506	5,669	0.37%	NA	0.00%
North Maluku	1,038,087	200	0.02%	0.02%	0.00%
West Papua	760,422	859	0.11%	0.68%	-0.57%
Papua	2,833,381	2,420	0.09%	0.16%	-0.07%

== Hindu holidays in Indonesia ==
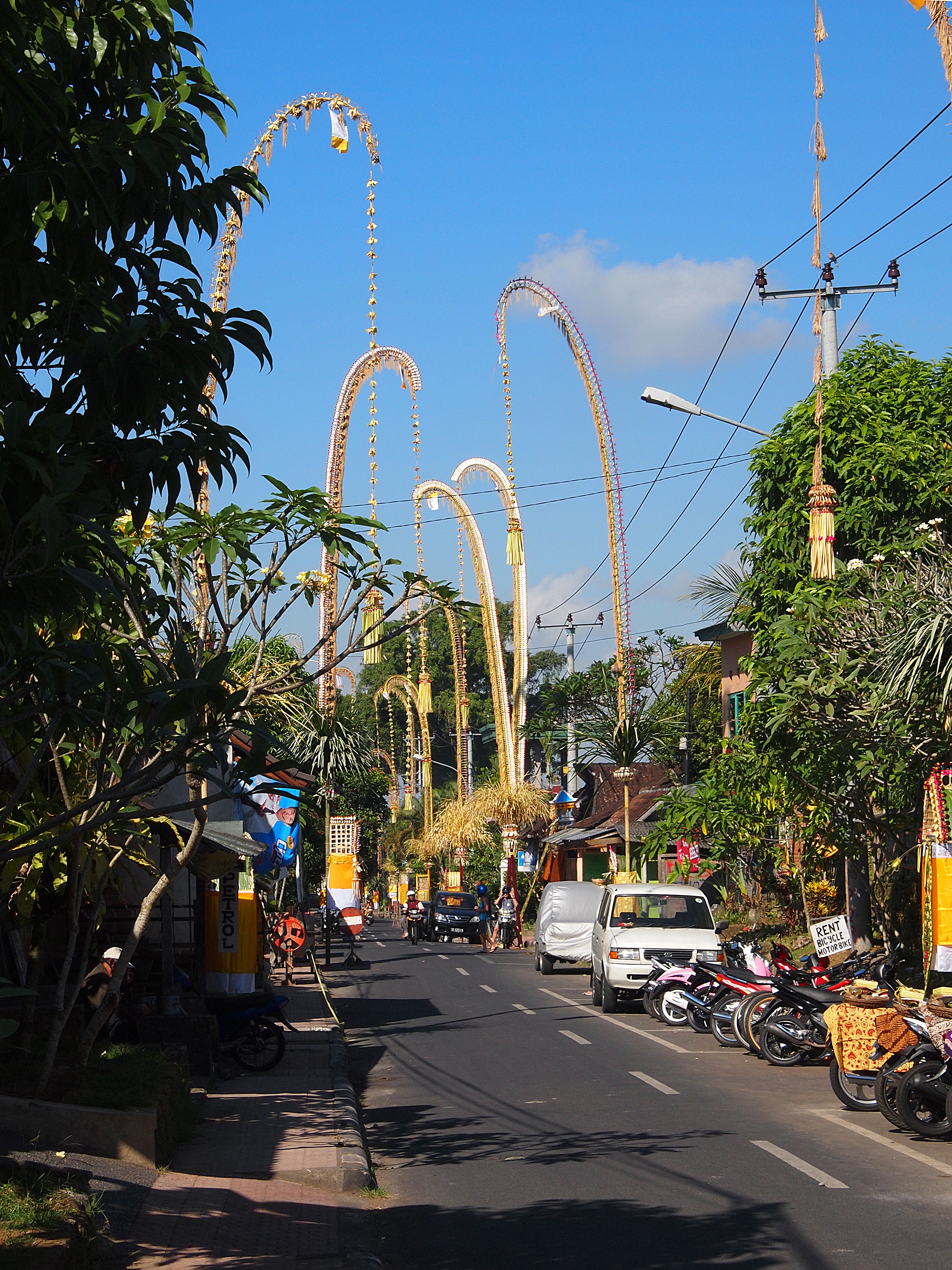
Street decoration in Bali for the Hindu festival Galungan. It celebrates the victory of dharma over adharma (right over wrong).

- Hari Raya Galungan occurs every 210 days and lasts for 10 days. It celebrates the coming of the gods and the ancestral spirits to earth to dwell again in the homes of their descendants. The festivities are characterized by offerings, dances and new clothes. The ancestors must be suitably entertained and welcomed, and prayers and offerings must be made for them. Families whose ancestors have not been cremated yet, but remain buried in the village cemetery, must make offerings at the graves. Kuningan is the last day of the holiday, when the gods and ancestors depart until the next Galungan.
- Hari Raya Saraswati is dedicated to the goddess of learning, science, and literature. She rules the intellectual and creative realm, and is the patron goddess of libraries and schools. Balinese Hindus believe that knowledge is an essential medium to achieve the goal of life as a human being, and so honor her. She is also celebrated because she succeeded in taming the wandering and lustful mind of her consort, Brahma, who was preoccupied with the goddess of material existence, Shatarupa. On this day, offerings are made to the lontar (palm-leaf manuscripts), books, and shrines. Saraswati Day is celebrated every 210-days on Saniscara Umanis Wuku Watugunung and marks the start of the new year according to the Balinese Pawukon calendar. Ceremonies and prayers are held at the temples in family compounds, educational institutions and temples, villages, and businesses from morning to noon. Teachers and students replace their uniforms for the day with bright and colorful ceremonial clothing, filling the island with color. Children bring fruit and traditional cakes to school for offerings at the temple.
- Hari Raya Nyepi is a Hindu Day of Silence or the Hindu New Year in the Balinese Saka calendar. The largest celebrations are held in Bali as well as in Balinese Hindu communities around Indonesia. On New Year's Eve the villages are cleaned, food is cooked for two days and in the evening as much noise is made as possible to scare away the devils. On the following day, Hindus do not leave their homes, cook or engage in any activity. Streets are deserted, and tourists are not allowed to leave hotel complexes. The day following Nyepi night, everything stops for a day except emergency services such as ambulances.

== Social life ==
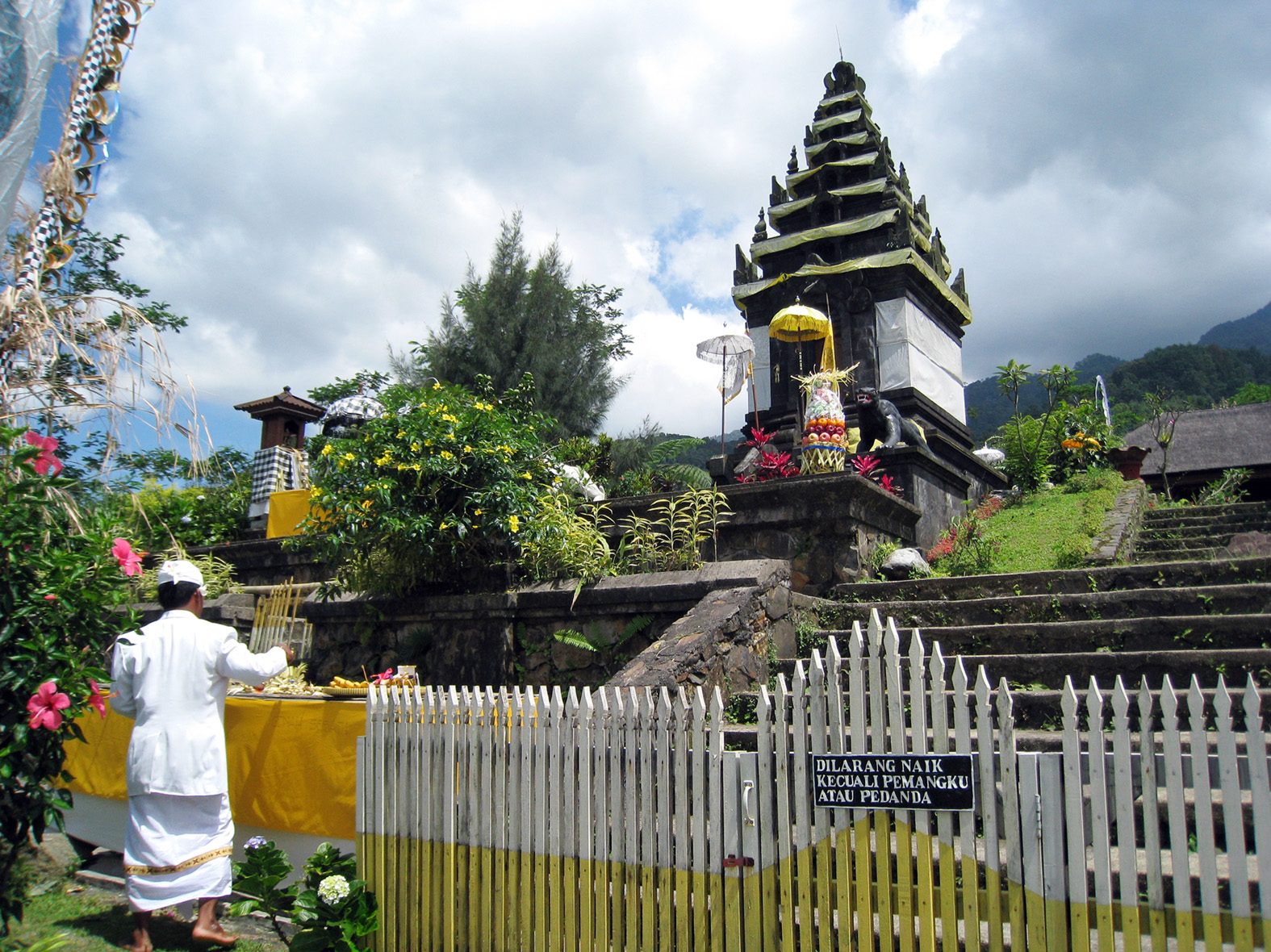
Balinese Hindus built a shrine dedicated to Sundanese Hindu King Sri Baduga Maharaja Sang Ratu Jaya Dewata in Pura Parahyangan Agung Jagatkarta, Bogor, West Java.

A common feature among new Hindu communities in Java is that they tend to rally around recently built temples (pura) or around archaeological temple sites (candi) which are being reclaimed as places of Hindu worship.

Similar mass conversions have occurred in the region around Pura Agung Blambangan, another new temple, built on a site with minor archaeological remnants attributed to the kingdom of Blambangan, the last Hindu polity on Java. A further important site is Pura Loka Moksa Jayabaya (in the village of Menang near Kediri), where the Hindu king and prophet Jayabaya is said to have achieved spiritual liberation (moksa).

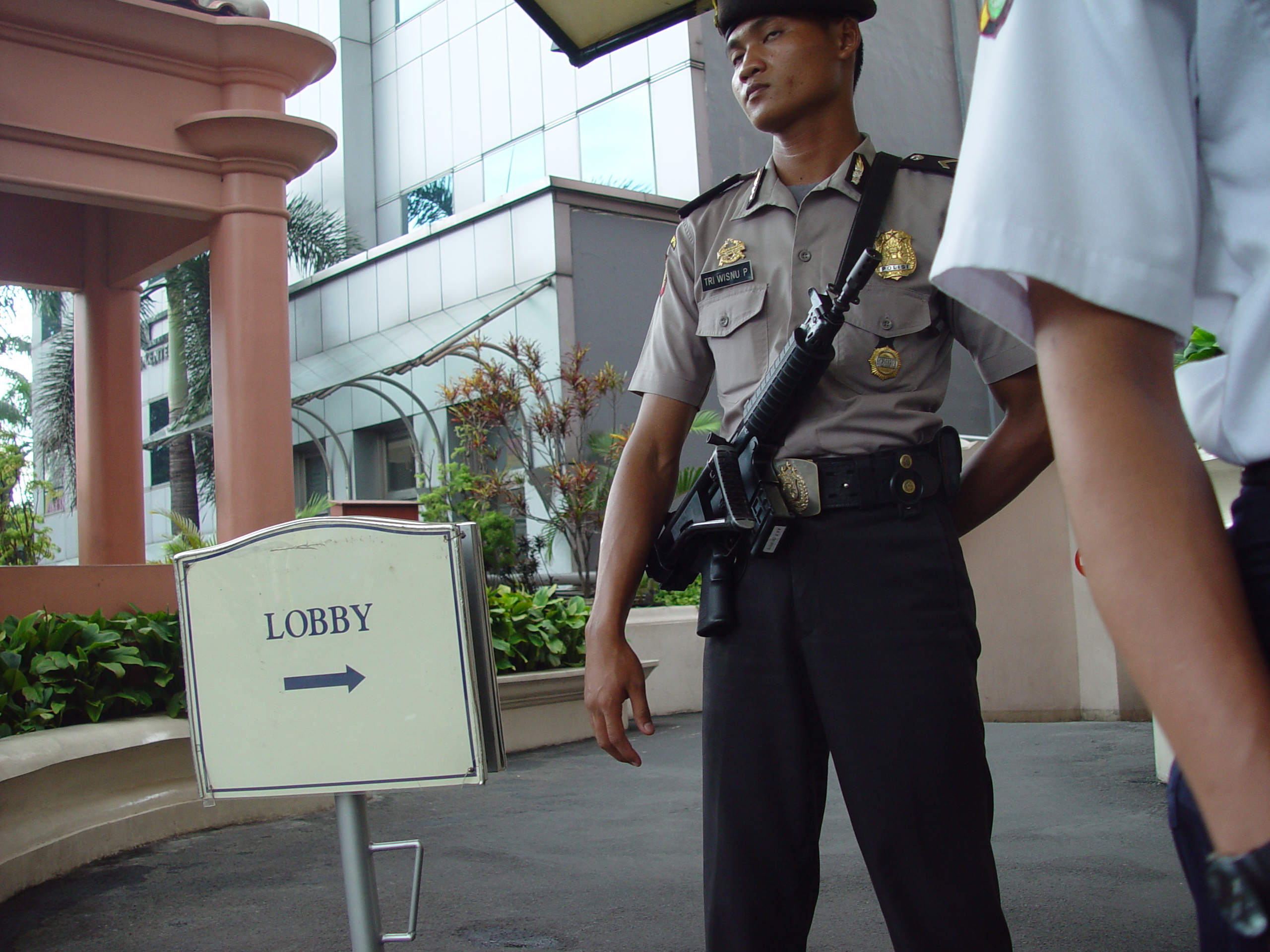
Many Indonesians (irrespective of the religion) use Hindu names such as Wisnu, Surya, Indra, Arya, Putra, Aditya, Sita, etc. The police officer above has the name written "Tri Wisnu".

A further Hindu movement in the earliest stages of development was observed in the vicinity of the newly completed Pura Pucak Raung (in the Eastern Javanese district of Glenmore), which is mentioned in Balinese literature as the place where the Hindu saint Maharishi Markandeya gathered followers for an expedition to Bali, whereby he is said to have brought Hinduism to the island in the fifth century AD. An example of resurgence around major archaeological remains of ancient Hindu temple sites was observed in Trowulan near Mojokerto. The site may be the location of the capital of the Hindu empire Majapahit. A local Hindu movement is struggling to gain control of a newly excavated temple building which they wish to see restored as a site of active Hindu worship. The temple is to be dedicated to Gajah Mada, the man attributed with transforming the small Hindu kingdom of Majapahit into an empire.

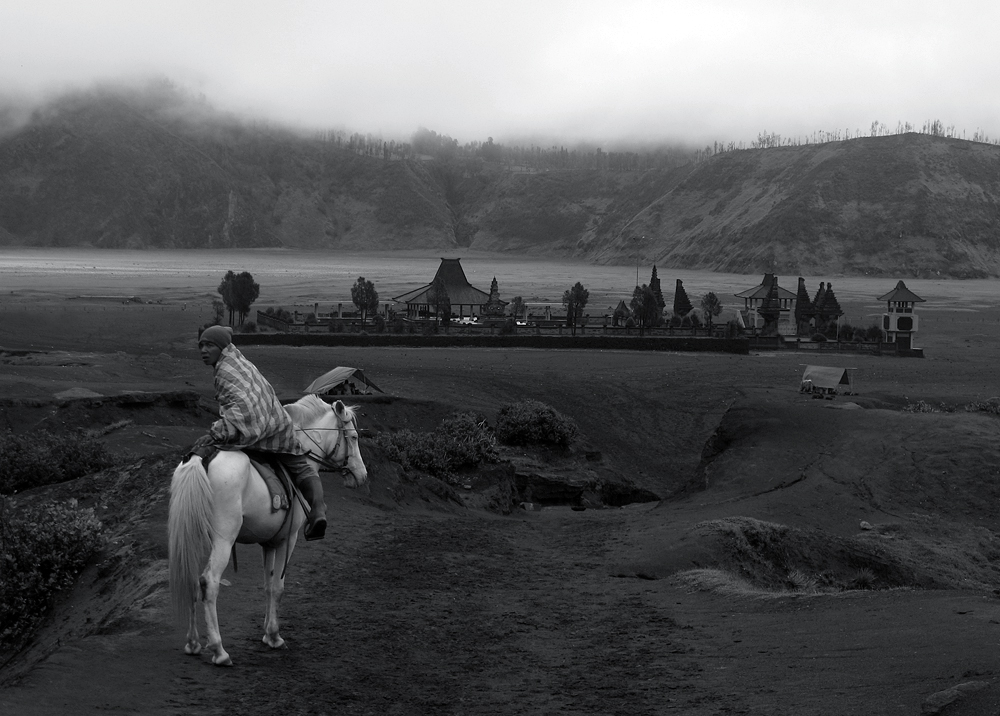
Tengger Hindu temple at Tengger caldera in East Java

In Karanganyar region in Central Java, the renovated 14th-century Cetho temple on the slope of Mount Lawu has become the center of Javanese Hinduism and gain patronage of Balinese temples and royal houses. A new temple is being built East of Solo (Surakarta). It is a Hindu temple that has miniatures of 50 sacred sites around the world. It is also an active kundalini yoga meditation center teaching the sacred Javanese tradition of sun and water meditation.

Although there has been a more pronounced history of resistance to Islamization in East Java, Hindu communities are also expanding in Central Java (Lyon 1980), for example in Klaten, near the ancient Hindu monuments of Prambanan. Today the Prambanan temple stages various annual Hindu ceremonies and festivals such as Galungan and Nyepi.

In West Java, a Hindu temple Pura Parahyangan Agung Jagatkarta was built on the slope of Mount Salak near the historic site of ancient Sunda Kingdom capital, Pakuan Pajajaran in modern Bogor. The temple, dubbed as the largest Balinese Hindu temple ever built outside Bali, was meant as the main temple for the Balinese Hindu population in the Greater Jakarta region.

== Tourism ==
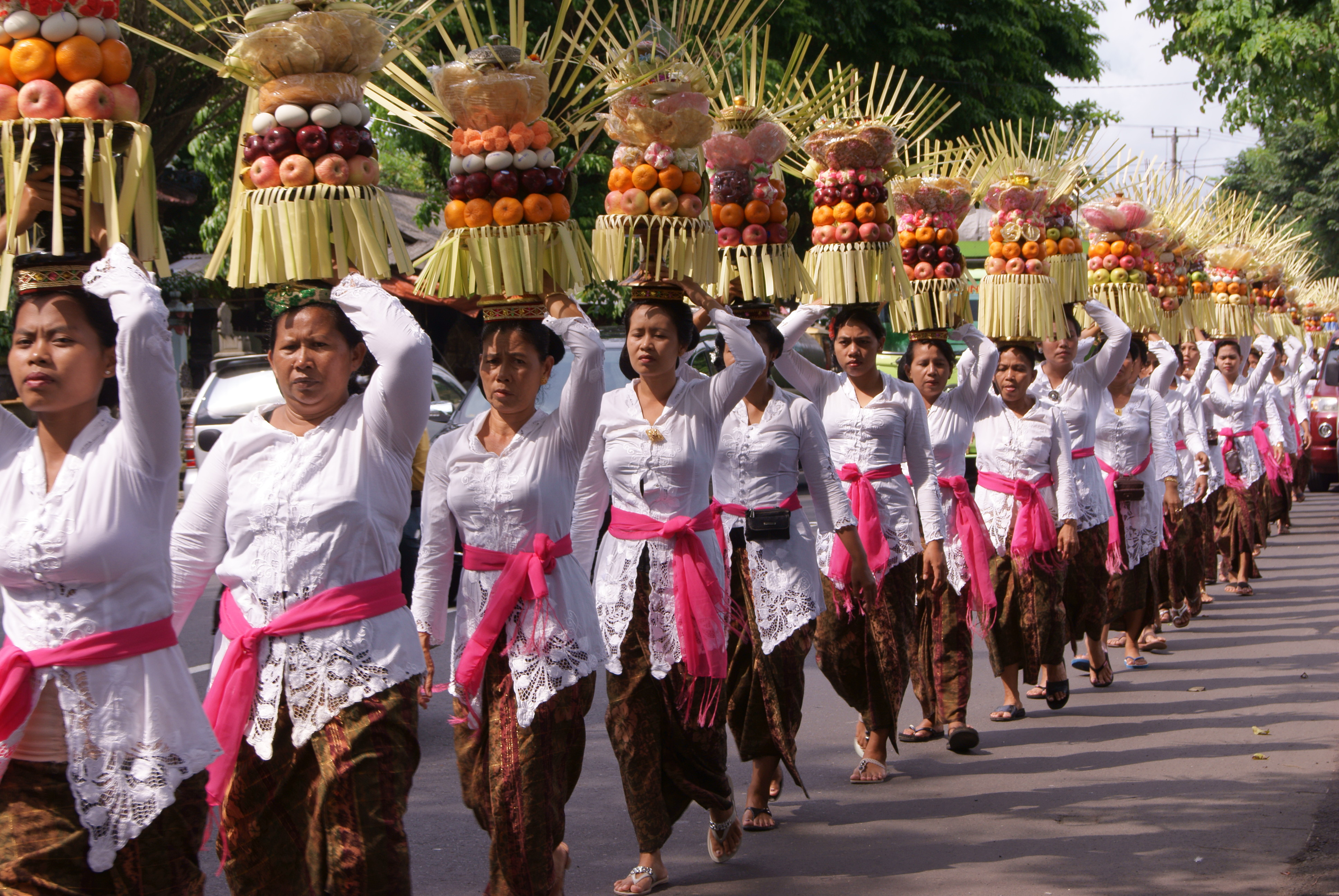
Colourful and festive Hindu rituals of Bali is one of island's attractions.

The predominantly Hindu island of Bali is the largest tourist draw in Indonesia. Next to natural beauty, the temple architecture, the elaborate Hindu festivals, rich culture, colorful art and vivid dances are the main attractions of Balinese tourism. As a result, tourism and hospitality services are flourishing as one of the most important sources of income and generation of Balinese economy. The high tourist activity in Bali is in contrast with other provinces in Indonesia where the Hindu population is not significant or is absent.

== Culture ==
Before the Islamization of Indonesia, the art and culture of Indonesia was deepely affected by the Hindu culture. Even in the modern Indonesia, many Indonesian Muslims and Christians, especially in Bali, Java and other islands follows the culture and traditions like that of Hindus. (Note: The lower number is based on Pew Research estimate and is primarily concentrated in the island of Bali, Indonesia and nearby provinces of Indonesia. The higher number is based on a 2010 estimate by the Ministry of Religious Affairs of the Government of Indonesia. The largest Hindu organization in Indonesia Parisada Hindu Dharma Indonesia states that the Indonesian census greatly underestimates Hindu population, because predominantly Muslim nation of Indonesia does not recognize all forms of Hinduism, and only recognizes monotheistic Hinduism under its constitution.)

=== Temples ===
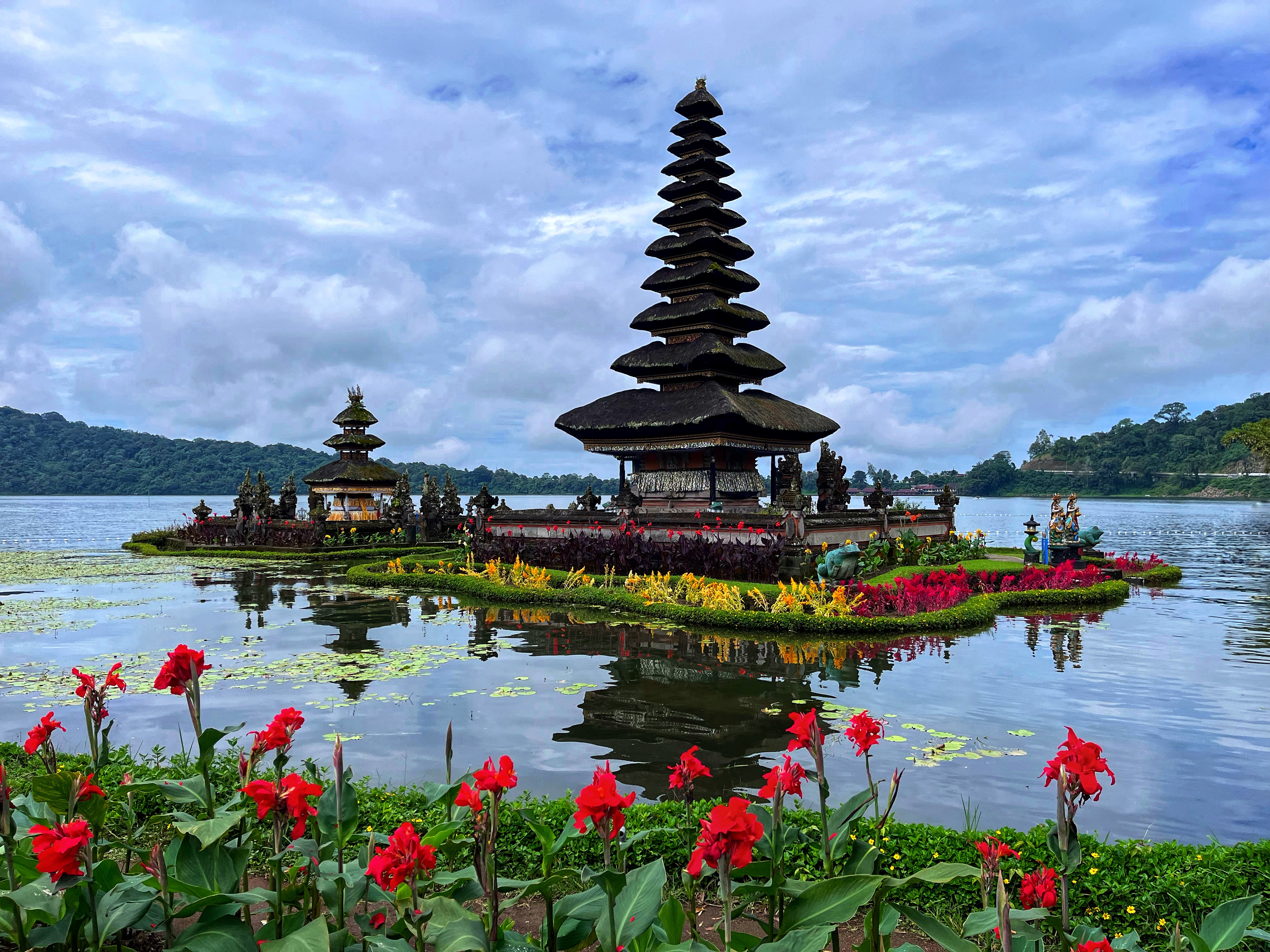
Balinese Hindu temple, Pura Ulun Danu Bratan, dedicated to the goddess Sarasvati, located in Highland Bali.

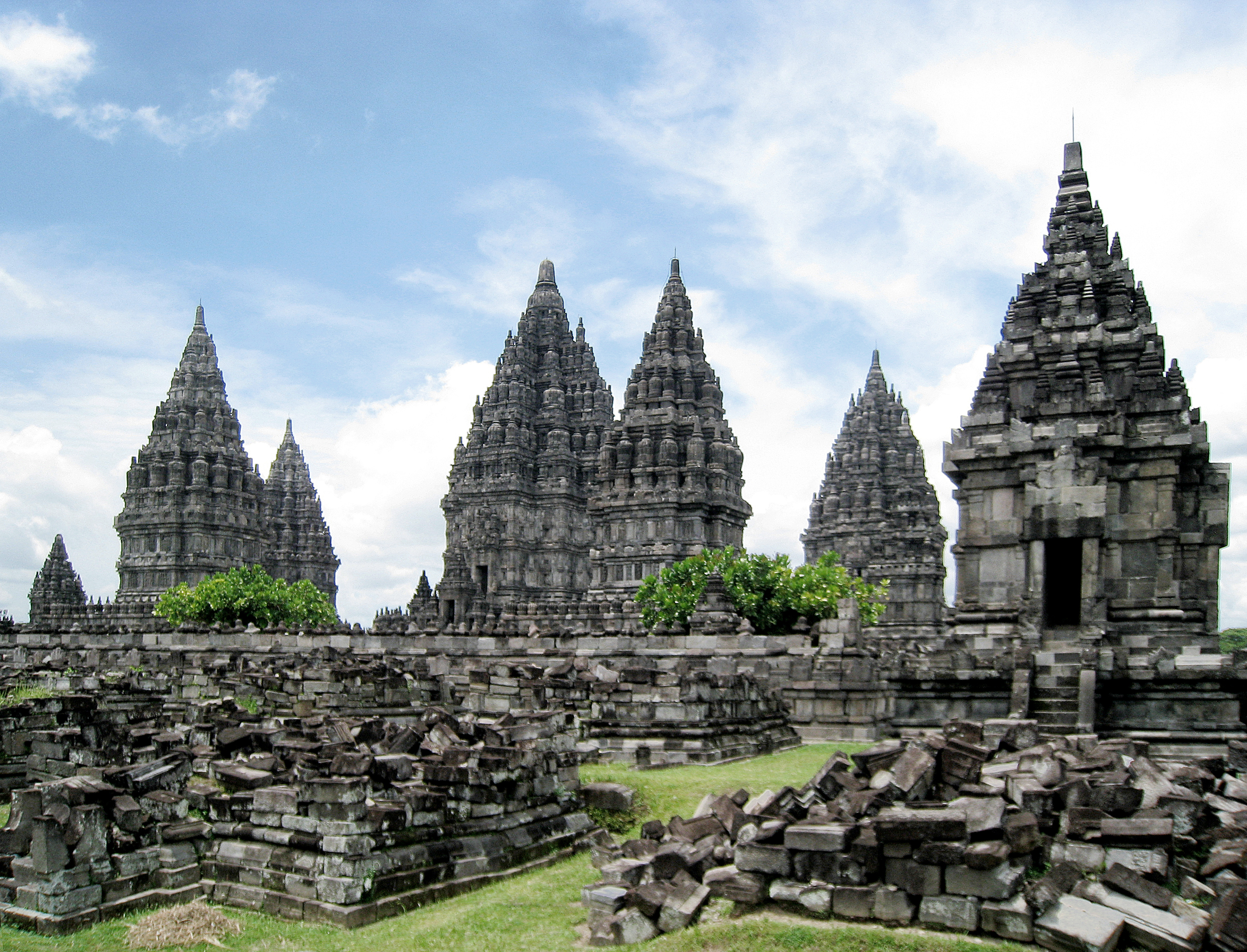
Candi Prambanan in Yogyakarta, the largest Hindu temple compound in Indonesia.

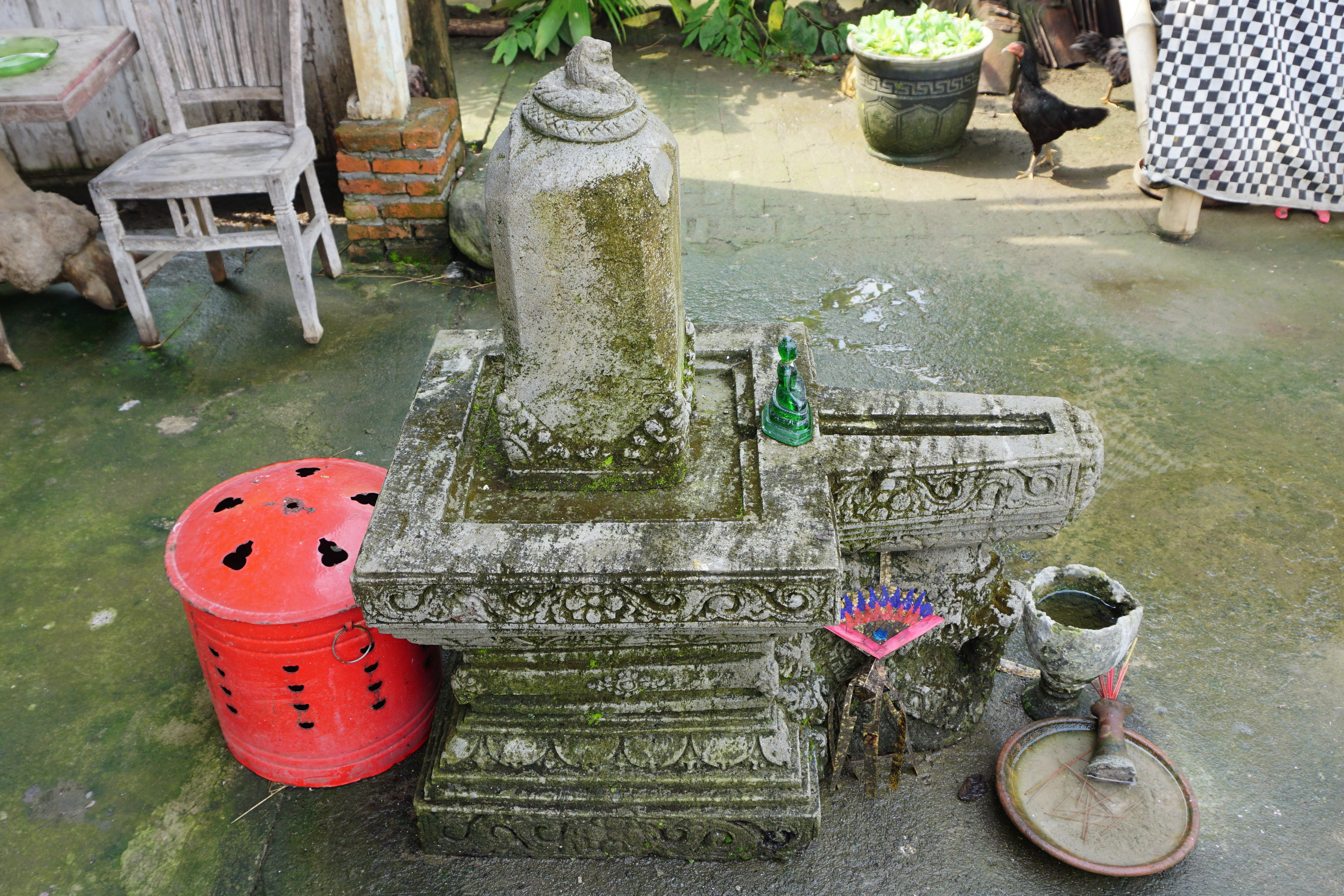
Lingam in Indonesia, in a temple.

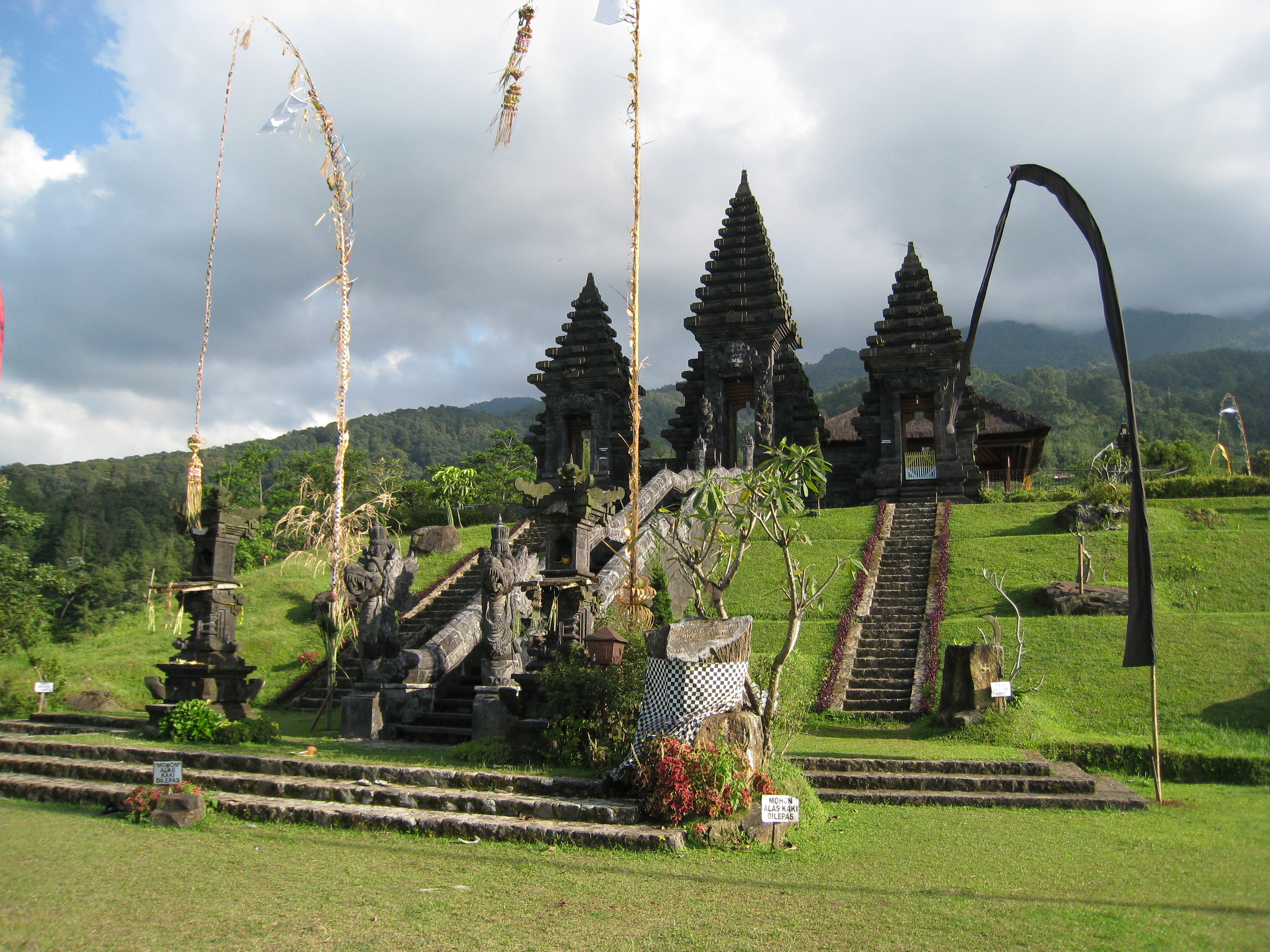
Pura Parahyangan Agung Jagatkarta in Bogor, located is nearest point of Jakarta.

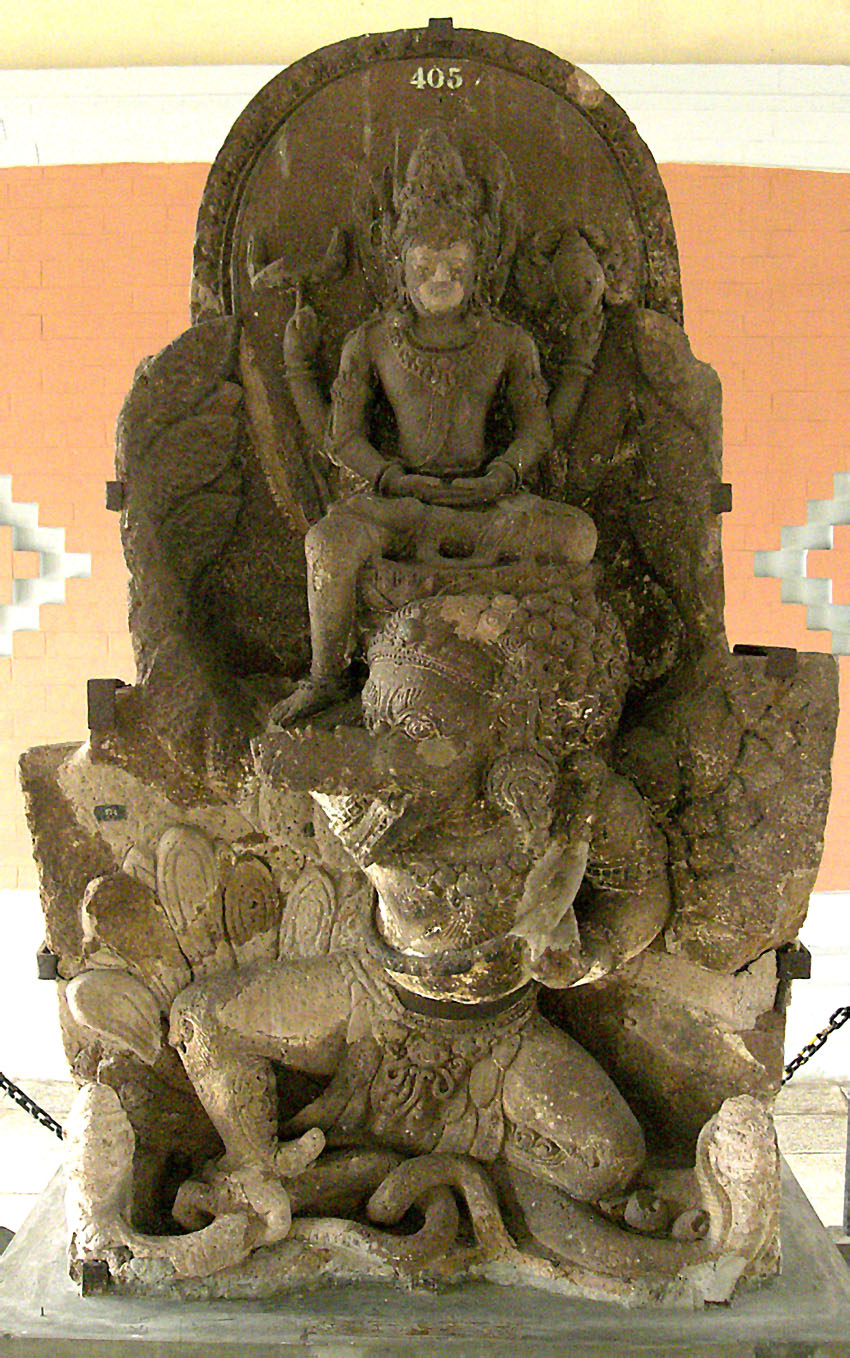
Garuda Pancasila is said to be inspired from Garuda.

The Hindu temple structure and architecture in Indonesia differs from the rest part of the world and has also quite diversity among them also. The temples structures in Indonesia can be classified in 3 ways:

1. Candi, the Javanese ancient Hindu temple. (This type of temple structure and architecture is mostly founded in Java and are place of worship for Javanese Hindus).
2. Pura, the Balinese temples. (A Pura is a Balinese temple and is place of worship for Balinese Hindus).
3. Kuil or mandir, the Indian Hindu temples. . (Note: Most of the Hindu temple, or Mandir are found in India and other places. They have Gopuramas and Vimana. They have different architecture as compared to Balinese temple and Candi.)

=== Symbolism ===
- The National emblem of Indonesia is called Garuda Pancasila. Garuda, the discipled carrier or vehicle (vahana) of Vishnu, appears in many ancient Hindu temples of ancient Indonesia. Garuda Pancasila was designed by Sultan Hamid II from Pontianak, supervised by Sukarno, and was adopted as the national emblem on 11 February 1950.
- Some Indonesian Muslims and Indonesian Christians have Sanskrit or Hindu deities' names, including Wisnu and Sury.

== Notable Hindus ==
=== Monarchs ===
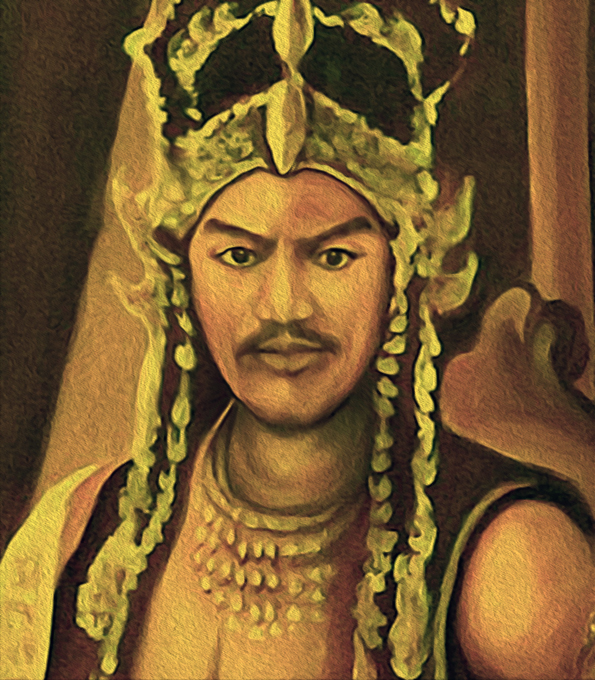
Sri Baduga Maharaja, of Hindu Sunda kingdom.

- Kudungga
- Mulavarman
- Purnawarman
- Adityawarman
- Airlangga
- Anak Wungsu
- Agung Anom
- Anusapati
- Arjayadengjayaketana
- Ken Arok
- Balitung
- Dalem Baturenggong
- Dalem Ketut
- Dalem Samprangan
- Dharmawangsa
- Hayam Wuruk
- Isyana Tunggawijaya
- Jayabaya
- Jayakatwang
- Jayanegara
- Jayapangus
- Samara Vijayatunggavarman
- Sanjaya of Mataram
- Sanna
- Siliwangi
- Mpu Sindok
- Sri Baduga Maharaja
- Śri Wijaya Mahadewi
- Suhita
- Ide Anak Agung Gde Agung

=== Religious leaders ===
- Ratu Bagus
- Ida Pedanda Gede Made Gunung
- Jayabaya
- D. Kumaraswamy
- Mangku Muriati
- Dang Hyang Nirartha
- Sabdapalon
- Ketut Wiana

=== Modern-day Hindus ===
- Happy Salma
- Ade Rai
- Manoj Punjabi
- Raam Punjabi
- Swami Anand Krishna
- Sri Prakash Lohia
- I Wayan Koster
- Dewa Budjana
- Sukmawati Sukarnoputri

== See also ==
- Abangan
- Acintya
- Balinese Hinduism
- Candi of Indonesia
- Hinduism in Java
- Hinduism in Southeast Asia
- Dewi Sri
- Hinduism in Bali
- List of Hindu empires and dynasties
- Hyang
- Indians in Indonesia
- List of Hindu temples in Indonesia
- Religion in Indonesia
- Sanskritization
- Trisandya
