= Lohia =

Lohia is an Indian surname.

Notable people with the surname include:

- Aarti Lohia
- Aloke Lohia (born 1958), Indian businessman
- Anuradha Lohia
- Mohan Lal Lohia, Indian businessman
- Ram Manohar Lohia, activist for the Indian independence movement
- Sri Prakash Lohia, Indian businessman
- Suhaani Lohia, Indian chess player
