= Indorama =

Indorama may refer to:

- Indorama Corporation
- Indorama Ventures
