= Lohia (disambiguation) =

Lohia is an Indian surname.

Lohia may also refer to:

- Lohia Machinery Limited, defunct Indian scooter and motorcycle manufacturer
- Lohia Boe Samuel, Papua New Guinean M.P.
- Lohia College, Rajastan, India
