= Widyalaya =

Type of Hindu schools in Indonesia

An utama widyalaya in Jembrana Regency, Bali

Widyalaya is a type of school in Indonesia regulated by the Ministry of Religious Affairs that follows a Hindu religious curriculum, similar to how madrasah follow the Islamic curriculum. The government established them in 2024 to formalise Hindu education in Indonesia.

== Establishment ==
Before formalisation, Hindu-based schools in Indonesia took the form of pasraman, an educational institution that focused solely on Hindu religious education. After the establishment of widyalayas, they became the second type of religious schools formalised after madrasahs, Islamic schools that blend secular and Islamic curricula, with widyalayas as their Hindu equivalent.

The curriculum consists of 60% secular subjects and 40% Hindu religious subjects and is equivalent to regular general school education. They are organised into pratama widyalayas, equivalent to kindergartens; adi widyalaya, equivalent to elementary schools; madyama widyalayas, equivalent to junior high schools; and utama widyalayas, equivalent to senior high schools; along with their vocational equivalent, utama widyalaya kejuruans, which are equivalent to Indonesian vocational high schools.

These types of schools are mainly centred in Bali, the centre of Hinduism in Indonesia, though they also exist in other parts of the country, such as Sulawesi and Kalimantan. Some of these widyalayas were converted from pasraman schools. After their establishment, several regional heads in Bali expressed interest in establishing government-run public widyalayas. As of 2026, all existing widyalayas have private school status, though nationalisation of several has been proposed, and regulations to nationalise them were added in 2025.

As of 2025, Indonesia has 110 pratama widyalas, 10 adi widyalas, 18 madyama widyalayas, 5 utama widyalayas, and 3 vocational utama widyalaya kejuruan. The effort to establish and formalise widyalayas was followed by the upgrading of state Hindu institutes to state university status.

== See also ==
- Education in Indonesia
- Hinduism in Indonesia
- Religious education
