= Mohan Lal Lohia =

Indian businessman

- Born: 21 December 1930; Calcutta, British Raj
- Died: 1 June 2017 (aged 86); New Delhi, India
- Occupation: Businessman
- Spouse(s): Kanchan Devi
- Children: 4, including Sri Prakash and Aloke Lohia

Mohan Lal Lohia (21 December 1930 – 1 June 2017) was an Indian businessman and business magnate, who founded the Indorama Corporation and the Lohia Foundation. The billionaires, Sri Prakash Lohia and Aloke Lohia are his sons.

== Early life and education ==
Mohan Lal Lohia was born on 21 December 1930, in Ratangarh, Rajasthan, India. He was educated in Jogbani, near the India–Nepal border.

== Career ==
In 1950 Lohia travelled to Burma (Myanmar), where he started working as a raw material purchase manager for an embroidery and lace manufacturing production. This job frequently took him to other countries such as Singapore and Japan. In the same year he started his own business as a textile manufacturer. According to his eldest son, Om Prakash, Lohia predicted the reforms passed by the Burmese government in 1963, which ordered foreign manufacturers to vacate their businesses and move out of Burma. Prior to that he had already established an embroidery and lace factory in Bangkok and a knitting, weaving and pressing mill in Nepal.

In 1973, he co-founded the Indorama Corporation, with his son, Sri Prakash Lohia. His son credits the foundation of the Indorama group to his father. It was after the 1985 textile policy, which was introduced by then Indian Prime minister Rajiv Gandhi, that Lohia felt that India became a suitable environment for business and subsequently decided to establish a business in India.

In 1991, at the age of 61, he stepped out of the family business to take on an advisory role in business decisions and divided the company between his three sons. The eldest was made chief executive officer of Indorama Synthetics in India, Prakash Lohia was handed the Indorama Chemicals based in Thailand, and Ajay Prakash Lohia got the Woolworth business based in Kolkata. Critical decisions continued to require his approval.

He is the founder of the Lohia Foundation. In November 2017, Lohia family had an estimated net worth of US$8.7 billion. Described as a business magnate, he was named in connection with the Panama Papers.

== Personal life and death ==
He was married to Kanchan Devi. The billionaires Sri Prakash Lohia and Aloke Lohia are their sons.

He died in New Delhi on 1 June 2017.
