= Indorama Corporation =

Singaporean company

- Type: Public
- Industry: Textile, polyester and PET, Spandex
- Founded: 1976
- Founder: Sri Prakash Lohia
- Headquarters: Singapore, Singapore
- Area served: Worldwide
- Key people: Sri Prakash Lohia (Chairman); Amit Lohia (Vice Chairman and Group CEO)
- Products: polyester filament yarns and fibres, PET resin, purified terephthalic acid (PTA), polyolefins, Spandex filament, power generation, real estate
- Website: indorama.com

Indorama Corporation is a Singapore-based corporate group with origins as Indorama Synthetics, established in 1975 in Indonesia. It manufactures polyethylene, polypropylene, polyester fibre, Spandex filament, spun yarns, fabrics, and other products. It has a presence in several countries and is a major producer of polyolefins.

== History ==
The business began in 1975 with the establishment of Indorama Synthetics in Purwakarta, an Indonesian town in West Java, by Mohan Lal Lohia and his son Sri Prakash Lohia, immigrants from India. The business expanded from a small spun-yarn manufacturer to become the largest textile raw materials producer in Indonesia, diversifying into production of polyester and polyethylene terephthalate (PET) raw materials and later expanding into petrochemicals in Africa. In 2008, the business was reorganized, with the polyester and PET businesses sold to Thailand-based Indorama Ventures—another corporate group of the Lohia family, headed by Sri Prakash's brother Aloke—and Indorama Corporation established in Singapore as a holding company for Indorama Synthetics. The group is now managed by Sri Prakash's son Amit.
