= Mangku Muriati =

Indonesian artist

Mangku Muriati (born in 1967) is a traditional-style Balinese painter and priestess from Kamasan village near Klungkung, Bali, Indonesia.

Mangku Muriati, born in 1967, paints in traditional Balinese form, known as Kamasan-style, where the aesthetic form and most stories relate to the wayang kulit puppet theatre. This form of painting has a very old tradition, associated with the East Javanese kingdom of Majapahit, which flourished in the fourteenth and fifteenth centuries and helped to propagate Hindu faith across the region – now largely retained in Bali. It was from the Kamasan village where artists were traditionally recruited to produce classical-style paintings on cloth (or bark cloth) for religious and ceremonial use as well as to decorate the palaces and temples.

Mangku Muriati is a daughter of Mangku Mura (1920-1999), who is considered one of the prominent artists of his generation in Kamasan-style painting.

As was common practice in artist families, Muriati used to help her father in colouring paintings from an early age, learning the craft of painting. She studied art at the Udayana University in Denpasar, Bali, but after graduating, returned to the traditional style of painting. Working as a Kamasan artist, she joined a small number of Balinese women who work in this style, customarily dominated by men.

In the 1990s, at the age of 32, Muriati became a priestess at her local clan temple in the ward of Banjar Siku. She considers painting and priestly duties as complementary, comparing the role of an artist to a dhalang or puppeteer, who needs an extensive knowledge of characters and stories, ultimately derived from what is considered the sacred scripture - the Hindu epics Ramayana and Mahabharata. The subjects of her paintings and related commentaries frequently refer to social and political issues in contemporary Bali.

Muriati’s paintings have been exhibited in Bali as well as internationally.

== See also ==
- Balinese art
