= Sri Prakash Lohia =

Indonesian billionaire businessman (born 1952)

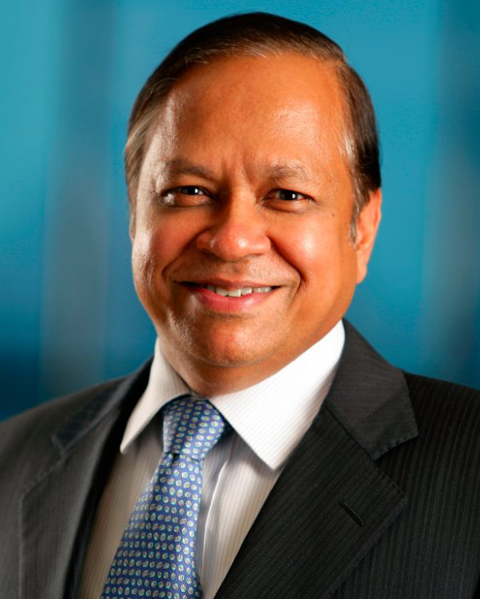
- Born: 11 August 1952 (age 74); Calcutta, India
- Citizenship: Indonesian
- Education: University of Delhi
- Occupation: Businessman
- Known for: Founder and chairman, Indorama Corporation
- Spouse: Seema Lohia
- Children: 2
- Parent(s): Mohan Lal Lohia; Kanchan Devi Lohia
- Relatives: Lakshmi Mittal (brother-in-law); Aloke Lohia (brother); Aarti Lohia (daughter-in-law)
- Website: www.indorama.com

Sri Prakash Lohia (born 11 August 1952) is an Indian-born Indonesian billionaire businessman, and the founder and chairman of Indorama Corporation, a diversified petrochemical and textile company.

Lohia hails from India, but has spent the majority of his professional life in Indonesia since 1974. As of November 2024, Forbes estimated his net worth at US$8.7 billion.

== Early life ==
Lohia was born in Kolkata on 11 August 1952 to Mohan Lal Lohia and Kanchan Devi Lohia. He has three brothers—Om, Ajey (original name Ajay Prakash), and Aloke (original name Alok or Anil Prakash)—and a sister—Aruna.

== Career ==
In 1973, Lohia moved to Indonesia with his father Mohan Lal Lohia and started Indorama Synthetics, which began to manufacture spun yarns in 1976.

The company was divided in the late 1980s by Mohan Lal Lohia between his three sons to avoid family disputes in the future. Lohia's elder brother Om Prakash was living in India when a factory was set up for him, also called Indorama Synthetics (India) Ltd.. Aloke, Lohia's younger brother, went to Thailand to start a new factory to produce Furfural alcohol from corn cobs. He later found Indorama Holdings, which is a wool yarn producer. SP Lohia remained in Indonesia to look after PT Indo Rama Synthetics which went public a few years later. He then diversified into manufacture of Polyester Yarns in the same campus where spun yarsns was being produced.

In 2006, Lohia acquired an integrated olefin plant in Nigeria, which is today the largest petrochemical company in West Africa and the second largest olefin producer in Africa.

== Wealth ==
In 2015, the Lohia family was one of the 50 wealthiest families in Asia.As of November 2024, his personal wealth is estimated by Forbes at US$8.70 billion

== Personal life ==
Lohia rarely gives interviews or makes public appearances.

Lohia and his wife, Seema Mittal (sister of Lakshmi Mittal), have two children, Amit and Shruti. Amit graduated magna cum laude from the University of Pennsylvania's Wharton School of Business.

Lohia is one of the world's largest collectors of old books and lithographs.

== Awards ==
In 2012, Lohia was given the Pravasi Bharatiya Samman award (Overseas Indian award) by the President of India.

== See also ==
- List of Indonesians by net worth
