= Sabdapalon =

Priest and adviser to Brawijaya V

Sabdapalon was a priest and adviser to Brawijaya V, the last ruler of the Hindu-Buddhist empire Majapahit in Java. He was mentioned in Darmagandhul, a Javanese spiritual story. He was also said to have cursed his king upon the latter's conversion to Islam in 1478. Sabdapalon then promised to return, after 500 years and at a time of widespread political corruption and natural disasters, to sweep Islam from the island and restore Hindu-Buddha Javanese religion, known as Buda, and his civilization.

Some of the first new Hindu temples built in Java were indeed completed around 1978, for example Pura Blambangan in the Banyuwangi Regency. As the prophesies foretold, Mt. Semeru erupted around the same time. All this is taken as evidence of the accuracy of Sabdapalon's predictions.

== See also ==
- Jayabaya
