= Aloke Lohia =

Indian billionaire businessman

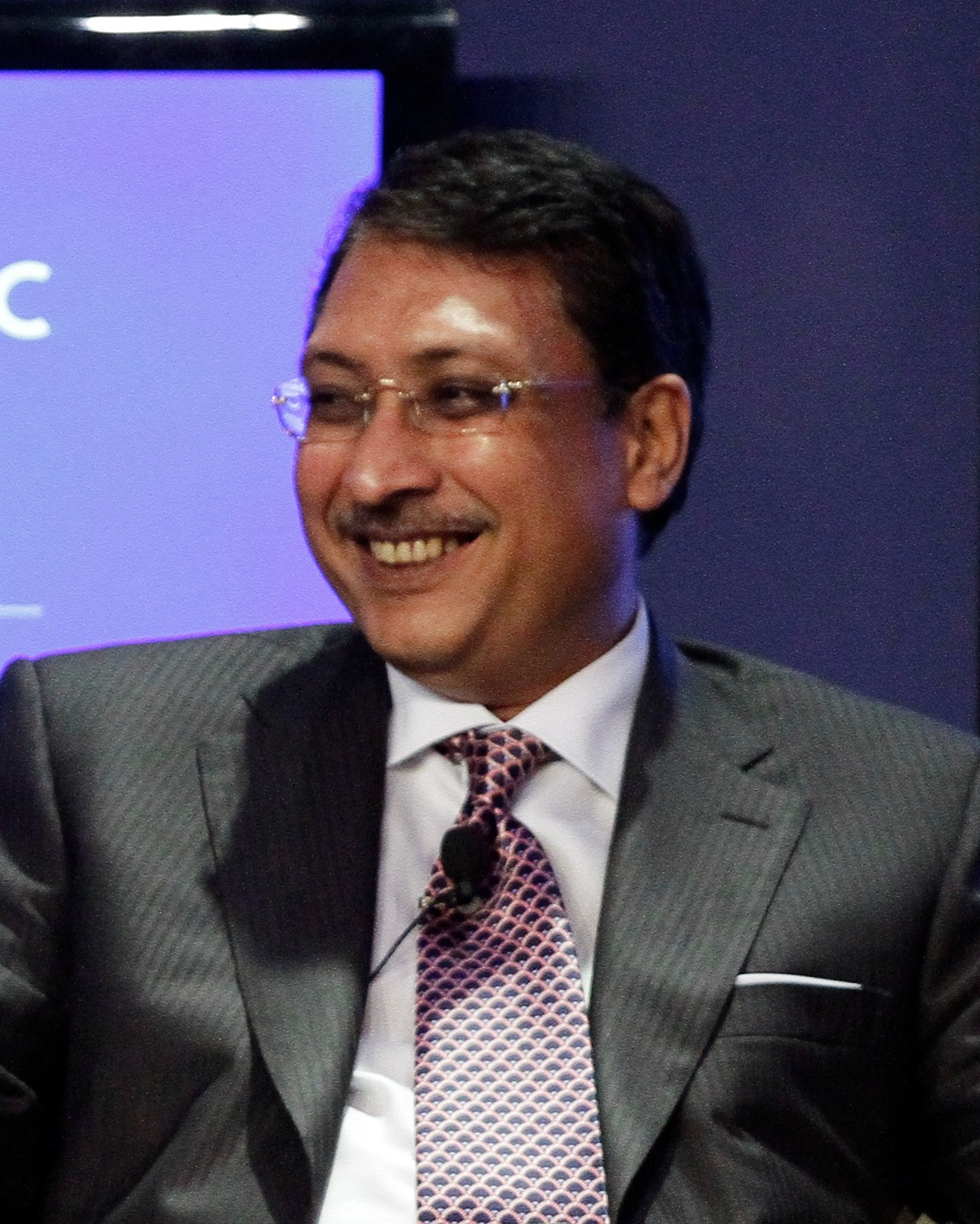
- Lohia in 2012
- Born: 27 November 1958 (age 67); Kolkata, India
- Education: University of Delhi
- Occupation: Businessman
- Years active: 1979–present
- Known for: Founder and CEO of Indorama Ventures
- Spouse: Suchitra Lohia
- Children: 3
- Parent: Mohan Lal Lohia
- Relatives: Sri Prakash Lohia (brother) Om Prakash Lohia (brother)

Aloke Lohia (Thai: อโลก โลเฮีย; born 27 November 1958) is an Thai-Indian billionaire businessman, and the founder and CEO of Indorama Ventures.

== Early and personal life ==
Lohia was educated at Delhi University, where he received a bachelor of commerce degree.

== Career ==
From 1979 to 1987, Lohia was the finance director of P.T. Indorama Synthetics, Indonesia.

In 1988, he moved to Thailand, where he founded Indorama Chemicals (now known as Aurus Specialty Company Limited) to turn corncobs into furfural alcohol, supported financially by the German Investment Corporation.

Lohia started Thailand's first wool business under the name Indorama Holdings in 1994 before starting Thailand's first PET (Polyethylene Terephthalate) business, Indorama Polymers, in 1995.

In February 2010, Lohia delisted Indorama Polymers and simultaneously listed its parent company Indorama Ventures on the Stock Exchange of Thailand. Indorama Ventures' revenue was approximately $7.5 billion at the end of 2014.

As of May 2021, his net worth was estimated at US$2.6 billion.

== Recognition ==
In 2011–2014, Lohia was included in the Top 40 Power Players by ICIS (Independent Chemical Information Service), the world's largest petrochemical market information provider.
