= Aarti Lohia =

Indian-born art collector, art patron and philanthropist

- Occupations: Chairperson, SP Lohia Foundation
- Spouse: Amit Lohia
- Children: Aria Lohia, Sohum Lohia and Shorya Lohia
- Awards: Top 200 Collectors ARTnews, 40 under 40 Asia Pacific
- Website: SPLF

Aarti Lohia is an Indian-born, London-based international art collector, arts patron, and philanthropist.She is best known for her contributions to contemporary South Asian art and her philanthropic work across the arts, culture, healthcare, and social welfare. Lohia is the Chairperson of SP Lohia Foundation. She has been recognised by ARTnews as one of the Top 200 art collectors globally and featured in Apollo magazine’s 40 under 40 list.

Aarti Lohia is actively involved with several leading international art and cultural institutions. She serves on the International Council of the Victoria & Albert Museum, the South Asian Acquisitions Committee at Tate Modern, and the British Fashion Council Foundation. She is a Trustee of the South London Gallery and serves as a Leading Philanthropic Partner and serves on its Modern and Contemporary Programme Advisory Panel. She also contributes to refugee welfare as a member of the Advisory Board of UK for UNHCR. Previously, she has been a member of MoMA’s David Rockefeller Council.

In India, she is a Platinum Patron of the Kochi-Muziris Biennale, the country’s only contemporary art biennale. Since 2015, Lohia has been the lead donor towards building the India Foundation for the Arts (IFA) Archive, based in Bangalore.

and Indorama Charitable Trust. Since 2015, she has been the lead donor, supporting the building of the India Foundation for the Arts Archive, The IFA Archive, based in Bangalore, India. Additionally, Lohia serves on several prestigious international councils and committees, such as the Victoria & Albert Museum's International Council, the South Asian Acquisitions Committee at Tate Modern, the Serpentine Gallery's International Council, the British Fashion Council Foundation, and MOMA's David Rockefeller Council. She also serves as the Trustee of The South London Gallery. She is recognized as a valuable member of the National Gallery's Modern and Contemporary Programme's Advisory Panel, holding the position of Leading Philanthropic Partner.

Early Interests and Family

Born in India, Aarti Lohia developed an interest in cultural preservation while living in Singapore, as a mother to two young children Sohum Lohia (15) and Aria Lohia (19). She nurtured her interest for contemporary artists from South East Asia and India over time, a passion that has evolved into a global engagement with contemporary art and philanthropy. She moved to London where she resides with her family and balances her philanthropic commitments with personal pursuits.

Aarti is also known for her role in nurturing her son, Sohum Lohia (15) an International Master in chess and three-time Under-12 British Chess Champion.

Recognition and Achievements

Aarti Lohia has been recognized internationally for her work in philanthropy and art patronage. She was listed in Apollo magazine’s prestigious "40 Under 40" list and named among ARTnews’ Top 200 Art Collectors in the world. Her consistent support for South Asian contemporary art and institutions working to archive, preserve, and promote cultural heritage has earned her acclaim in art circles.

Through her leadership at the SP Lohia Foundation, Lohia supports diverse initiatives aimed at social impact and empowerment—ranging from healthcare and education to culture and the arts. Her efforts have contributed to strengthening platforms for South Asian art and elevating the visibility of artists and institutions in the region.
