= Indorama Ventures =

Thai chemical company

- Company type: Public
- Traded as: SET: IVL
- ISIN: TH1027010004
- Industry: Petrochemicals
- Founded: 21 February 2003
- Founder: Aloke Lohia
- Headquarters: Bangkok, Thailand
- Area served: Worldwide
- Key people: Aloke Lohia (Vice Chairman and Group CEO)
- Products: polyethylene terephthalate (PET), polyester fibers and yarns, wool yarns, purified terephthalic acid (PTA), ethylene oxide (EO), ethylene glycol (EG)
- Divisions: Feedstock, PET, Fibers, Surfactants
- Website: indoramaventures.com

Indorama Ventures (IVL) is a producer of intermediate petrochemicals industry, the world's largest producer of PET resins.

== History ==
In the first half of 2011, IVL completed further acquisitions of PET plants in China, Indonesia, Mexico, Poland and the USA, and became the world's largest PET producer.

As of February 2021, IVL was the market leader in PET in the US, and the largest polyester fiber producer in Thailand.

== Criticism ==
=== Involvement in Israeli settlements ===
On 12 February 2020, the United Nations published a database of all business enterprises involved in certain specified activities related to the Israeli settlements in the Occupied Palestinian Territories, including East Jerusalem, and in the occupied Golan Heights. Indorama Ventures and its subsidiary, Avgol Industries, have been listed on the database in light of their involvement in activities related to "the use of natural resources, in particular water and land, for business purposes". The international community considers Israeli settlements built on land occupied by Israel to be in violation of international law. In response to the listing, Indorama Ventures and Avgol announced that they are moving their operations outside of the West Bank.
