= Sukarno =

President of Indonesia from 1945 to 1967

- Official portrait, c. 1949

1st President of Indonesia
- In office 18 August 1945 – 12 March 1967 (Note: On 11 March 1966, Sukarno delegated authority to General Suharto to guarantee security and stability. This effectively ended Sukarno's presidential powers. However, Sukarno remained as the nominal president until he was removed by the People's Consultative Assembly on 12 March 1967.)
- Prime Minister: See list: Sutan Sjahrir (1945‍–‍1947); Amir Sjarifuddin (1947‍–‍1948); Mohammad Hatta (1948‍–‍1950); Abdul Halim (1950); Mohammad Natsir (1950‍–‍1951); Soekiman Wirjosandjojo (1951‍–‍1952); Wilopo (1952‍–‍1953); Ali Sastroamidjojo (1953‍–‍1955); Burhanuddin Harahap (1955‍–‍1956); Ali Sastroamidjojo (1956‍–‍1957); Djuanda Kartawidjaja (1957‍–‍1959); Himself (1959‍–‍1966) (Note: De facto (self-appointed)); Suharto (1966‍–‍1967) (Note: As Chairman of the Cabinet Presidium)
- Vice President: Mohammad Hatta (1945–1956)
- Preceded by: Office established
- Succeeded by: Suharto

President of the United States of Indonesia
- In office 27 December 1949 – 17 August 1950
- Prime Minister: Mohammad Hatta
- Vice President: Mohammad Hatta
- Preceded by: Tony Lovink (as High Commissioner of the Dutch East Indies)
- Succeeded by: Himself (as President of Indonesia)

12th Prime Minister of Indonesia
- De facto (self-appointed)
- In office 9 July 1959 – 25 July 1966
- President: Himself
- Deputy: See list
- Preceded by: Djuanda Kartawidjaja
- Succeeded by: Suharto (as Chairman of the Cabinet Presidium)

Personal details
- Born: Koesno Sosrodihardjo; 6 June 1901 Soerabaja, Dutch East Indies
- Died: 21 June 1970 (aged 69) Jakarta, Indonesia
- Resting place: Grave of Sukarno
- Party: Independent
- Other political affiliations: PNI (1927–1931)
- Height: 172 cm (5 ft 8 in)
- Spouse: Siti Oetari (m. 1921; div. 1923) Inggit Garnasih (m. 1923; div. 1943) Fatmawati (m. 1943; sep. 1953) Hartini (m. 1953) Maharani Wisma Susana Siregar (m. 1958; div. 1962) Sakiko Kanase (m. 1958; died 1959) Kartini Manoppo (m. 1959; div. 1968) Naoko Nemoto (m. 1962) Haryati (m. 1963; div. 1966) Amelia De La Rama (m. 1964) Yurike Sanger (m. 1964; div. 1968) Heldy Djafar (m. 1966; div. 1969)
- Children: 14, including Rukmini, Guntur, Megawati, Rachmawati, Sukmawati, and Guruh
- Parents: Soekemi Sosrodihardjo (father); Ida Ayu Nyoman Rai (mother)
- Education: Hogere Burgerschool te Soerabaja; Technische Hoogeschool te Bandoeng (Ir.)
- Occupation: Politician; engineer; activist
- Awards: Lenin Peace Prize (1960); National Hero (1988, 2012)
- Nicknames: Bung Karno; Great Lover; Padoeka Jang Moelia
- Sukarno's voice Sukarno announcing the Dwi Komando Rakyat during the Indonesia–Malaysia confrontation Recorded 3 May 1964

Sukarno (Note: English pronunciation: /suːˈkɑːrnoʊ/ soo-KAR-noh, Indonesian pronunciation: [suˈkarno], Javanese pronunciation: [suˈkarnɔ]; also spelt Soekarno.) (born Koesno Sosrodihardjo; (Note: Javanese pronunciation: [ˈkʊsnɔ sɔsrɔdiˈhardʒɔ], Indonesian pronunciation: [ˈkusno sosrodiˈhardʒo].) 6 June 1901 – 21 June 1970) was an Indonesian politician, activist, and revolutionary who served as the first president of Indonesia from 1945 to 1967.

Born in Surabaya, Sukarno was a major figure of the Indonesian struggle for independence from the Dutch colonialists. He was a prominent leader of Indonesia's nationalist movement during the colonial period and spent over a decade under Dutch detention until released by the invading Japanese forces in World War II. Sukarno and his fellow nationalists collaborated to garner support for the Japanese war effort from the population, so Japan would help spread nationalist ideas. Upon Japanese surrender, Sukarno and Mohammad Hatta declared Indonesian independence on 17 August 1945, and Sukarno was appointed president. He led the Indonesian resistance to Dutch re-colonisation efforts via diplomatic and military means until the Dutch recognition of Indonesian independence in 1949. As a result, he was given the title "Father of Proclamation" (Indonesian: Bapak Proklamator).

After a tumultuous period of parliamentary democracy, Sukarno introduced an authoritarian system known as "Guided Democracy" in 1959 to restore stability and suppress regional rebellions. By the early 1960s, Sukarno pursued an aggressive foreign policy and positioned Indonesia as a leading voice in the Non-Aligned Movement (NAM). The policies increased tensions with Western powers and brought Indonesia closer to the Soviet Union, despite being a non-communist state. The culmination of this policy was CONEFO, Sukarno's plan for a new United Nations based in Jakarta.

On 1 October 1965, following the events of the 30 September Movement, a coup attempt allegedly orchestrated by senior leaders in the Communist Party of Indonesia (PKI), General Suharto assumed control of the government in a military takeover. It was accompanied by a large-scale purge in which between 500,000 and over 1 million people were killed in mass killings targeting members and suspected sympathisers of the PKI. Suharto officially became president in 1967, while Sukarno was placed under house arrest until his death in 1970. He was buried in Blitar, East Java, next to his mother.

During the first few years of Suharto's presidency, Sukarno's legacy and his role in the country's independence were minimized, and his name was largely removed from public discourse. However, as opposition against Suharto increased with his eventual fall in 1998, public interest in Sukarno was revived in tandem to democratic reforms. Today, his legacy as the founding father of Indonesia and a symbol of national unity and independence continues to be widely respected by many Indonesians, often more so than that of Suharto.

== Name ==
The name Sukarno comes from the mythological chief hero of the Mahabharata, Karna. The spelling Soekarno, based on Dutch orthography, is still in frequent use, mainly because he signed his name in the old spelling. Sukarno himself insisted on a "u" in writing, not "oe," but said that he had been told in school to use the Dutch style, and that after 50 years, it was too difficult to change his signature, so he still signed with an "oe." Official Indonesian presidential decrees from the period 1947–1968, however, printed his name using the 1947 spelling. The Soekarno–Hatta International Airport, which serves the area near Indonesia's capital, Jakarta, still uses the Dutch spelling.

Indonesians also remember him as Bung Karno (Brother/Comrade/Dude Karno) or Pak Karno ("Mr. Karno"). Like many Javanese people, he had only one name.

He is sometimes referred to in foreign accounts as Achmed Sukarno, or some variation thereof. A source from the Ministry of Foreign Affairs revealed that "Achmed" (later, written as "Ahmad" or "Ahmed" by Arab states and other foreign state press) was coined by M. Zein Hassan, an Indonesian student at Al-Azhar University and later a member of the staff at the Ministry, to establish Sukarno's identity as a Muslim to the Egyptian press after a brief controversy at that time in Egypt alleging Sukarno's name was "not Muslim enough." After the use of the name "Achmed" began, Muslim and Arab states freely supported Sukarno. Thus, in correspondence with the Middle East, Sukarno always signed his name as "Achmed Sukarno."

== Early life and family ==
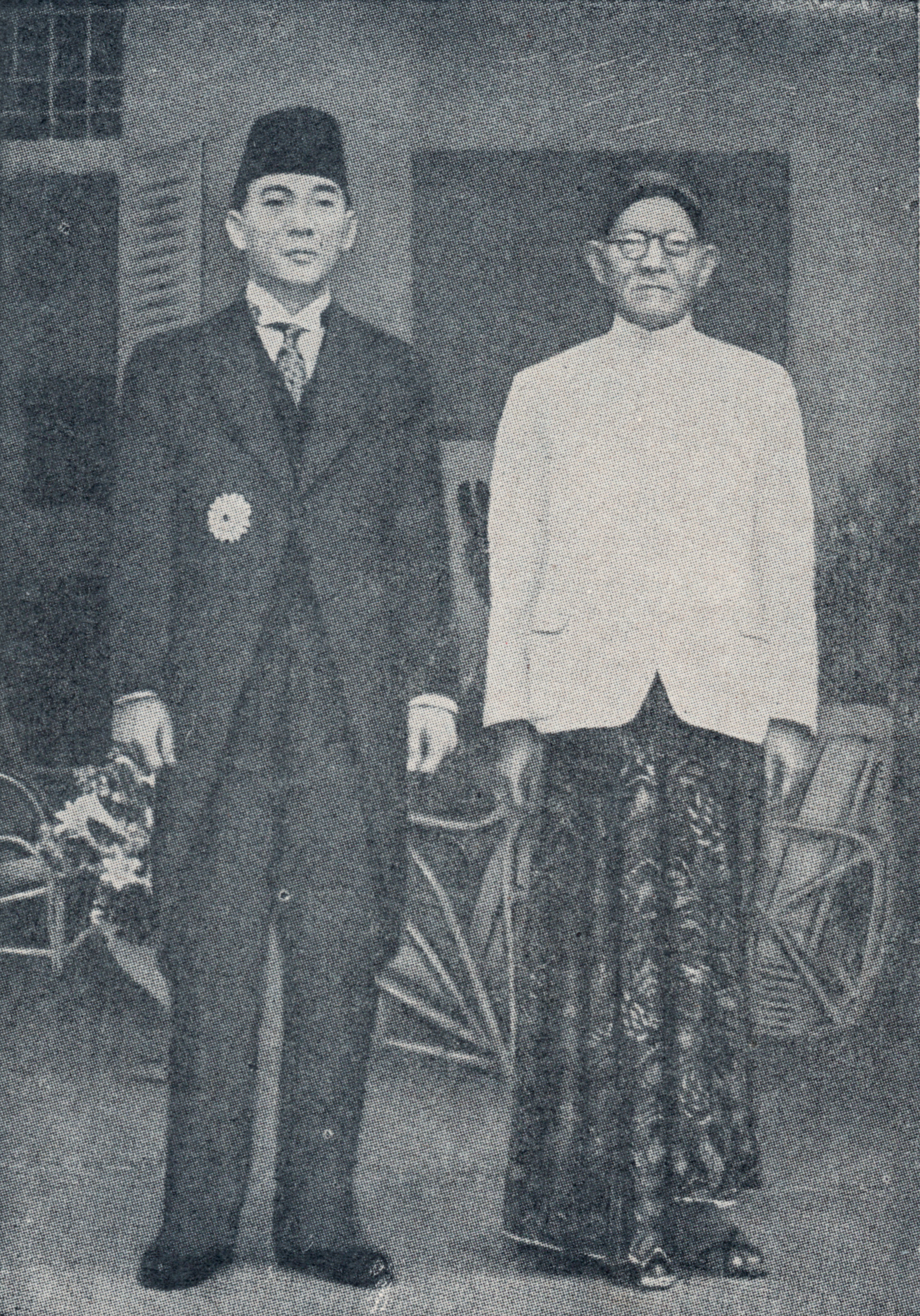
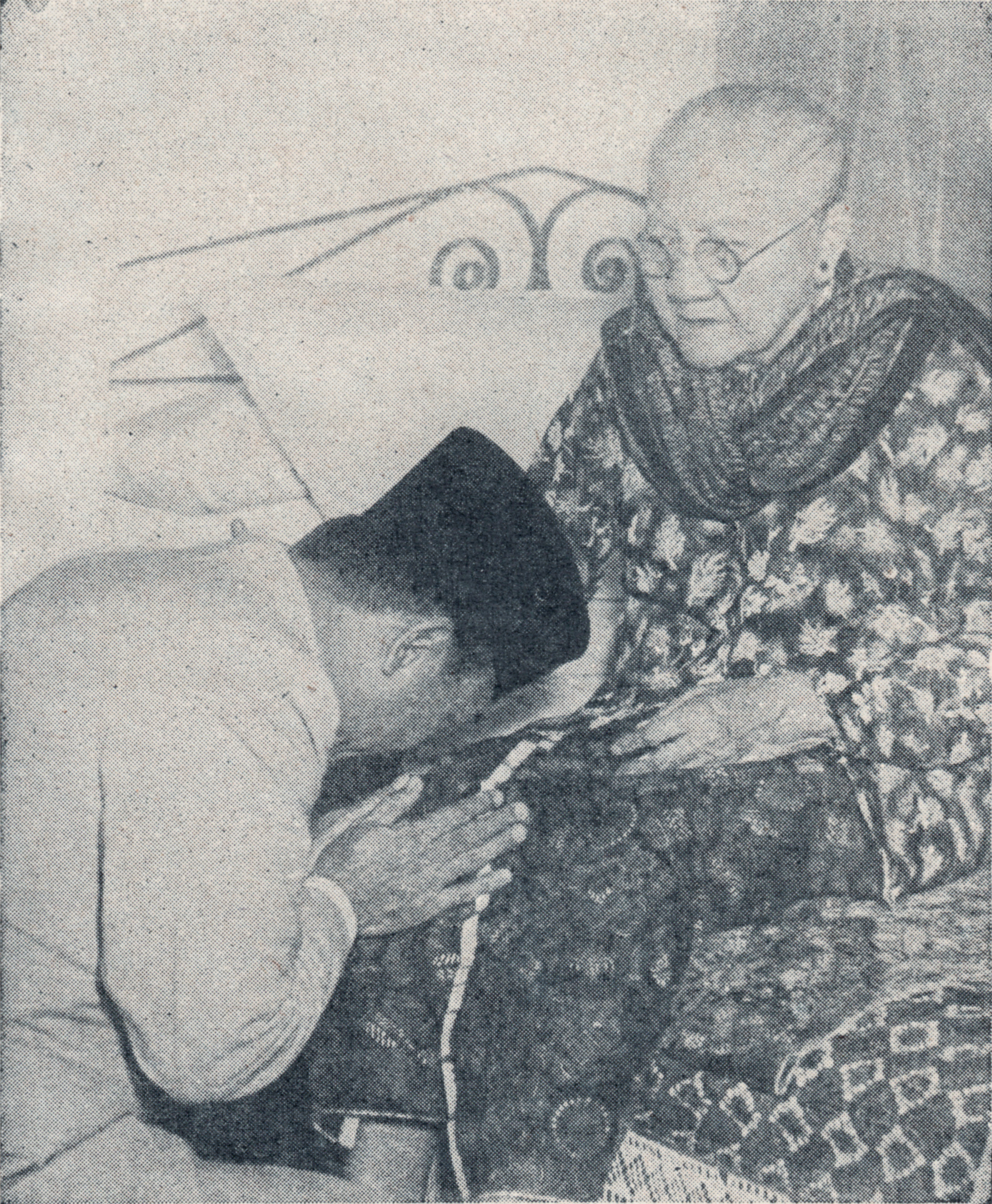
Sukarno with his father, Raden Soekemi Sosrodihardjo (left), and with his mother, Ida Ayu Nyoman Rai (right).

The son of a Muslim Javanese primary school teacher, a priyayi named Raden Soekemi Sosrodihardjo who hailed from Grobogan, Central Java, and his Hindu Balinese wife from the Brahmin caste named Ida Ayu Nyoman Rai from Buleleng, Bali, Sukarno was born in Surabaya, East Java, in the Dutch East Indies (now Indonesia), where his father had been sent following an application for a transfer to Java. He was originally named Kusno Sosrodihardjo. Following Javanese custom, he was renamed after surviving a childhood illness.

== Education ==
After graduating from a native primary school in 1912, he was sent to the Europeesche Lagere School (a Dutch primary school) in Mojokerto. Subsequently, in 1916, Sukarno went to a Hogere Burgerschool (a Dutch-type higher-level secondary school) in Surabaya, where he met Tjokroaminoto, a nationalist and founder of Sarekat Islam. In 1920, Sukarno married Tjokroaminoto's daughter Siti Oetari. In 1921, he began to study civil engineering (with a focus on architecture) at the Technische Hoogeschool te Bandoeng (Bandoeng Institute of Technology), where he obtained an Ingenieur degree (abbreviated as "Ir.", a Dutch-type engineer's degree) in 1926. During his study in Bandung, Sukarno became romantically involved with Inggit Garnasih, the wife of Sanoesi, the owner of the boarding house where he lived as a student. Inggit was 13 years older than Sukarno. In March 1923, Sukarno divorced Siti Oetari to marry Inggit (who also divorced her husband Sanoesi). Sukarno later divorced Inggit and married Fatmawati.

Atypically among the country's small educated elite, Sukarno was fluent in several languages. In addition to the Javanese language of his childhood, he spoke Sundanese, Balinese, Indonesian, and Dutch. He was also quite comfortable in German, English, French, Arabic, and Japanese, all of which were taught at his HBS.

In his studies, Sukarno was "intensely modern", both in architecture and in politics. He despised both the traditional Javanese feudalism, which he considered "backward" and to blame for the fall of the country under Dutch occupation and exploitation, and the imperialism practised by Western countries, which he termed as "exploitation of humans by other humans" (exploitation de l'homme par l'homme). He blamed this for the deep poverty and low levels of education of the Indonesian people under the Dutch. To promote nationalistic pride amongst Indonesians, Sukarno interpreted these ideas in his dress, in his urban planning for the capital (eventually Jakarta), and in his socialist politics, though he did not extend his taste for modern art to pop music; he had the Indonesian musical group Koes Bersaudara imprisoned for their allegedly decadent lyrics despite his reputation for womanising. For Sukarno, modernity was blind to race, neat and elegant in style, and anti-imperialist.

== Architectural career ==
After graduation in 1926, Sukarno and his university friend Anwari established the architectural firm Soekarno & Anwari in Bandung, which provided planning and contractor services. Among Sukarno's architectural works are the renovated building of the Preanger Hotel (1929), where he acted as assistant to famous Dutch architect Charles Prosper Wolff Schoemaker. Sukarno also designed many private houses on today's Jalan Gatot Subroto, Jalan Palasari, and Jalan Dewi Sartika in Bandung.

Later on, as president, Sukarno remained engaged in architecture, designing the Proclamation Monument and adjacent Gedung Pola in Jakarta; the Youth Monument (Tugu Muda) in Semarang; the Alun-alun Monument in Malang; the Heroes' Monument in Surabaya; and also the new city of Palangkaraya in Central Kalimantan. Sukarno was also deeply involved in building the Gelora Bung Karno Sports Complex which includes him proposing the design for the roof of its main stadium.

== Early struggle ==
Sukarno was first exposed to nationalist ideas while living under Tjokroaminoto. Later, while a student in Bandung, he immersed himself in European, American, nationalist, communist, and religious political philosophy, eventually developing his own political ideology of Indonesian-style socialist self-sufficiency. He began styling his ideas as Marhaenism, named after Marhaen, an Indonesian peasant he met in the southern Bandung area, who owned his little plot of land and worked on it himself, producing sufficient income to support his family. In university, Sukarno began organizing a study club for Indonesian students, the Algemeene Studieclub, in opposition to the established student clubs dominated by Dutch students.

=== Involvement in the Indonesian National Party ===
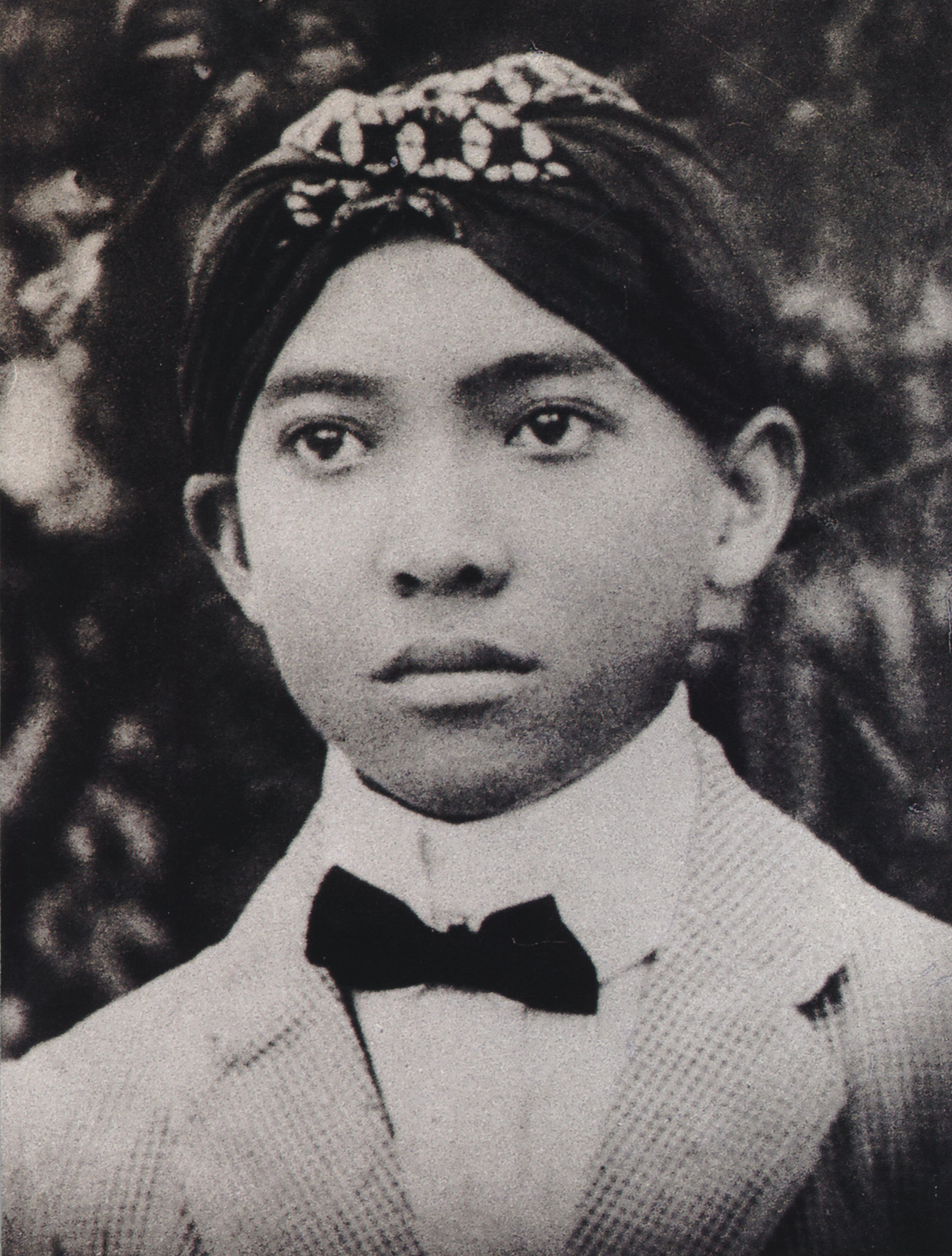
Sukarno as a HBS student in Surabaya, 1916

On 4 July 1927, Sukarno with his friends from the Algemeene Studieclub established a pro-independence party, the Indonesian National Party (PNI), of which Sukarno was elected the first leader. The party advocated independence for Indonesia, and opposed imperialism and capitalism because it opined that both systems worsened the life of Indonesian people. The party also advocated secularism and unity amongst the many different ethnicities in the Dutch East Indies, to establish a united Indonesia. Sukarno also hoped that Japan would commence a war against the western powers and that Indonesia could then gain its independence with Japan's aid. Coming soon after the disintegration of Sarekat Islam in the early 1920s and the crushing of the Indonesian Communist Party after its failed rebellion of 1926, the PNI began to attract a large number of followers, particularly among the new university-educated youths eager for broader freedoms and opportunities denied to them in the racist and constrictive political system of Dutch colonialism.

=== Arrest, trial, and imprisonment ===
==== Arrest and trial ====
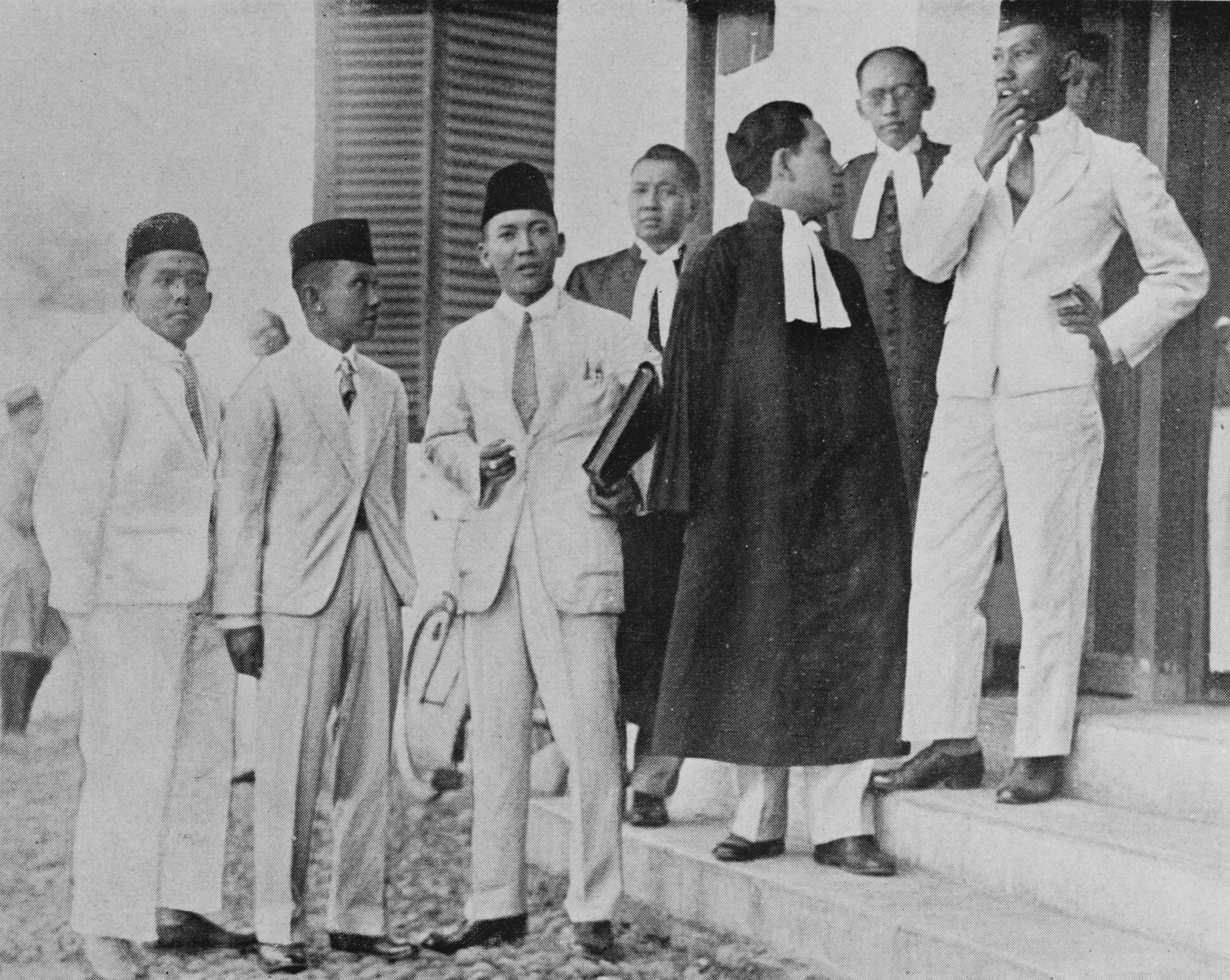
Sukarno with fellow defendants and attorneys during his trial in Bandung, 1930

PNI activities came to the attention of the colonial government, and Sukarno's speeches and meetings were often infiltrated and disrupted by agents of the colonial secret police (Politieke Inlichtingendienst). Eventually, Sukarno and other key PNI leaders were arrested on 29 December 1929 by Dutch colonial authorities in a series of raids throughout Java. Sukarno himself was arrested while on a visit to Yogyakarta. During his trial at the Bandung Landraad courthouse from August to December 1930, Sukarno made a series of long political speeches attacking colonialism and imperialism, titled Indonesia Menggoegat (Indonesia Accuses).

==== Imprisonment ====
In December 1930, Sukarno was sentenced to four years in prison, which were served in Sukamiskin prison in Bandung. His speech, however, received extensive coverage by the press, and due to strong pressure from the liberal elements in both the Netherlands and the Dutch East Indies, his sentence was shortened to two years by governor-general Andries Cornelis Dirk de Graeff. Sukarno was released early on 31 December 1931. By this time, he had become a popular hero widely known throughout Indonesia.

However, during his imprisonment, the PNI had been splintered by the oppression of colonial authorities and internal dissension. The original PNI was disbanded by the Dutch, and its former members formed two different parties; the Indonesia Party (Partindo) under Sukarno's associate Sartono who were promoting mass agitation, and the Indonesian Nationalist Education (New PNI) under Mohammad Hatta and Sutan Sjahrir, two nationalists who recently returned from studies in the Netherlands, and who were promoting a long-term strategy of providing modern education to the uneducated Indonesian populace to develop an intellectual elite able to offer effective resistance to Dutch rule. After attempting to reconcile the two parties to establish one united nationalist front, Sukarno chose to become the head of Partindo on 28 July 1932. Partindo had maintained its alignment with Sukarno's own strategy of immediate mass agitation, and Sukarno disagreed with Hatta's long-term cadre-based struggle. Hatta himself believed Indonesian independence would not occur within his lifetime, while Sukarno believed Hatta's strategy ignored the fact that politics can only make real changes through formation and utilisation of force (machtsvorming en machtsaanwending).

During this period, to support himself and the party financially, Sukarno returned to architecture, opening the bureau of Soekarno & Roosseno with his university junior Roosseno. He also wrote articles for the party's newspaper, Fikiran Ra'jat (People's Mind). While based in Bandung, Sukarno travelled extensively throughout Java to establish contacts with other nationalists. His activities attracted further attention by the Dutch PID. In mid-1933, Sukarno published a series of writings titled Mentjapai Indonesia Merdeka ("To Attain Independent Indonesia"). For this writing, he was arrested by Dutch police while visiting fellow nationalist Mohammad Hoesni Thamrin in Jakarta on 1 August 1933.

=== Exile to Flores and Bengkulu ===
This time, to prevent providing Sukarno with a platform to make political speeches, the hardline governor-general Jonkheer Bonifacius Cornelis de Jonge utilised his emergency powers to send Sukarno to internal exile without trial. In 1934, Sukarno was shipped, along with his family (including Inggit Garnasih), to the remote town of Ende, on the island of Flores. During his time in Flores, he utilised his limited freedom of movement to establish a children's theatre. Among its members was future politician Frans Seda. Due to an outbreak of malaria in Flores, the Dutch authorities decided to move Sukarno and his family to Bencoolen (now Bengkulu) on the western coast of Sumatra, in February 1938.

In Bengkulu, Sukarno became acquainted with Hassan Din, the local head of the Muhammadiyah organization, and he was allowed to teach religious teachings at a local school owned by the Muhammadiyah. One of his students was 15-year-old Fatmawati, daughter of Hassan Din. He became romantically involved with Fatmawati, which he justified by stating the inability of Inggit Garnasih to produce children during their almost 20-year marriage. Sukarno was still in Bengkulu exile when the Japanese invaded the archipelago in 1942.

== World War II and the Japanese occupation ==
=== Background and invasion ===
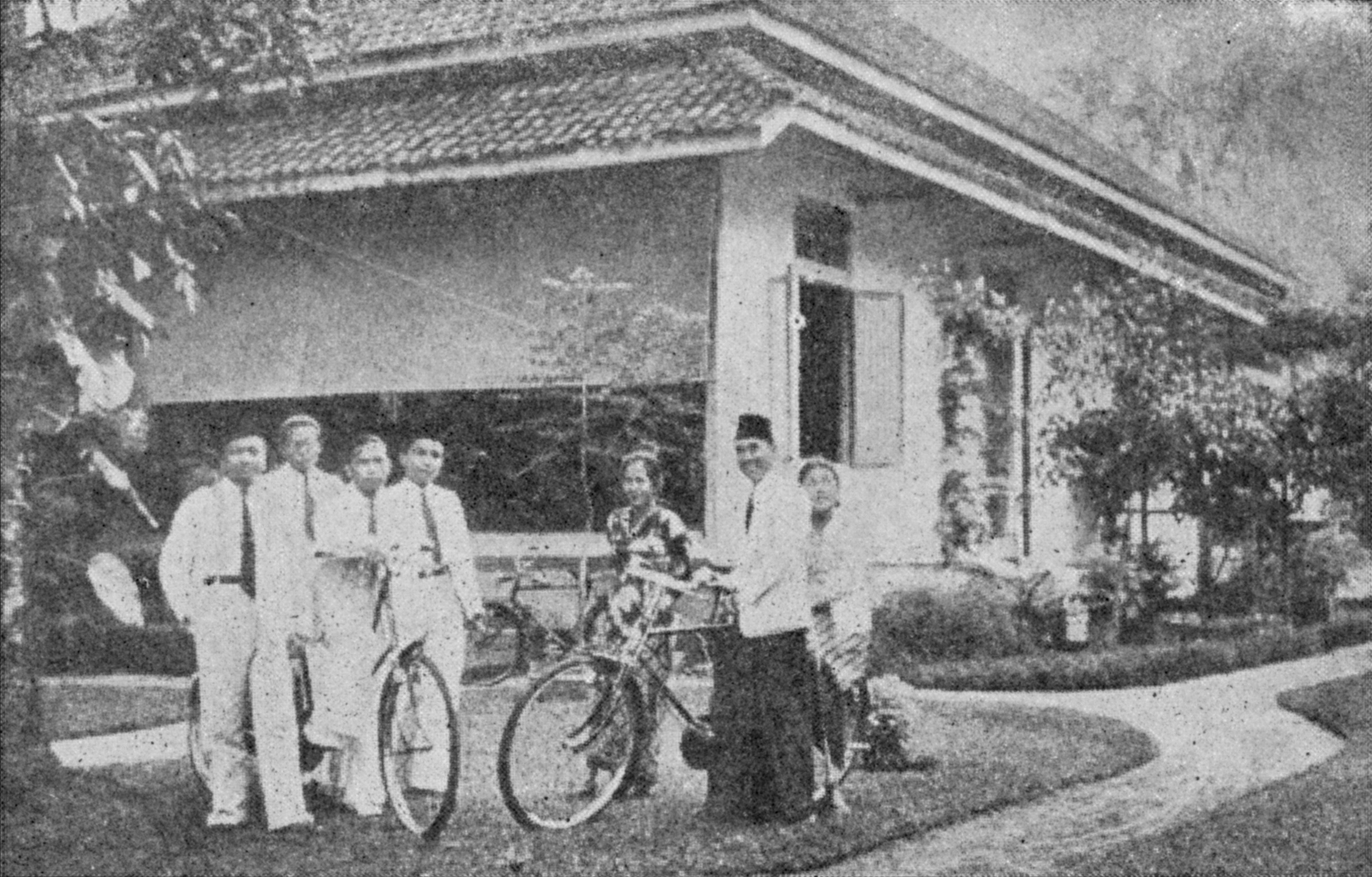
Sukarno at his home in exile, Bengkulu

In early 1929, during the Indonesian National Revival, Sukarno and fellow Indonesian nationalist leader Hatta (later Vice President), first foresaw a Pacific War and the opportunity that a Japanese advance on Indonesia might present for the Indonesian independence cause. On 10 January 1942, Imperial Japan invaded the Dutch East Indies quickly defeating Dutch forces who marched, bussed and trucked Sukarno and his entourage three hundred kilometres from Bengkulu to Padang, Sumatra. The Dutch intended keeping him prisoner and shipping him to Australia but abruptly abandoned him to save themselves upon the impending approach of Japanese forces on Padang.

=== Cooperation with the Japanese ===
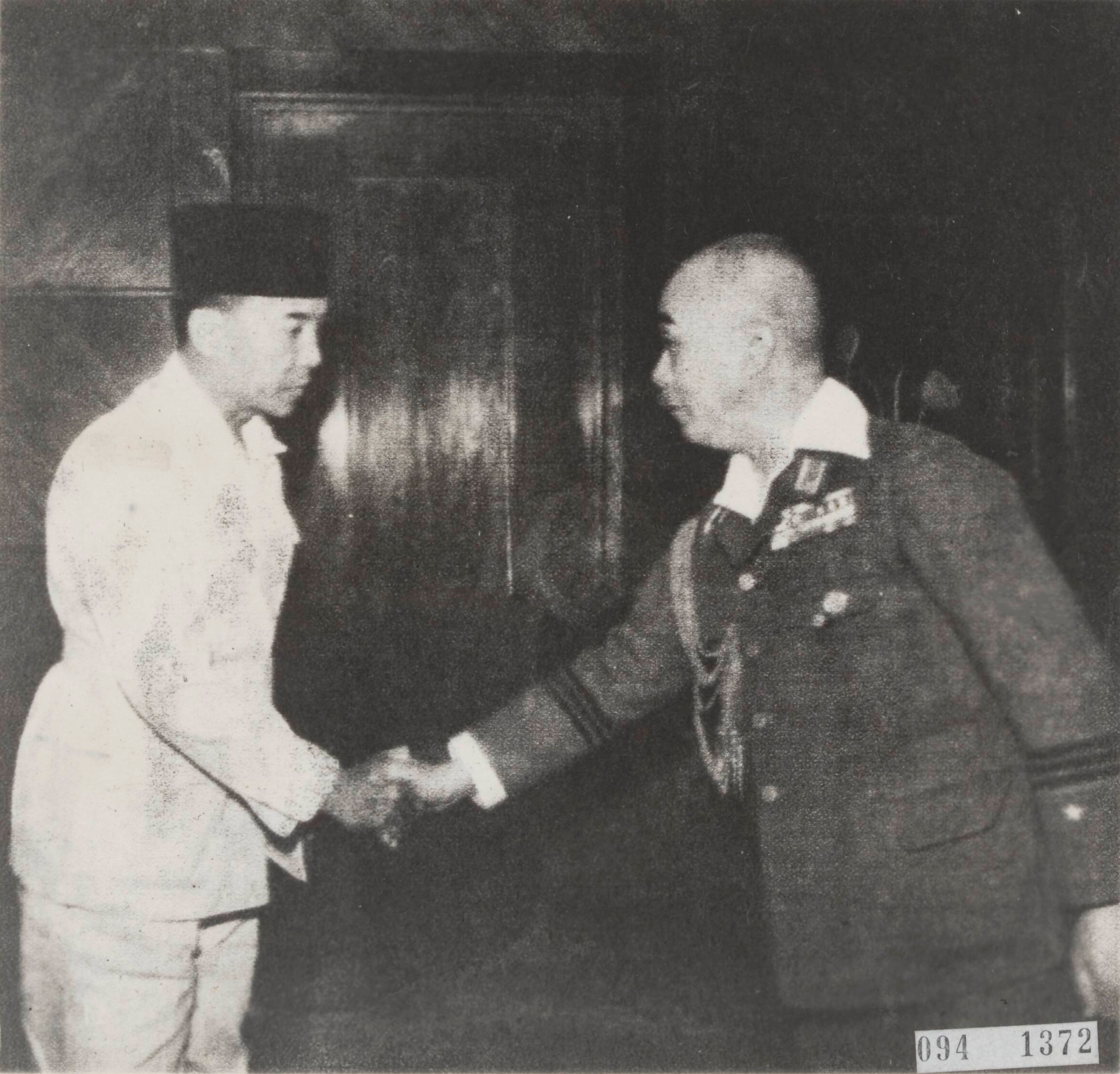
Sukarno shaking hands with the Japanese director of the interior for occupied Dutch East Indies, General Moichiri Yamamoto, September 1944

The Japanese had their own files on Sukarno, and the Japanese commander in Sumatra approached him with respect, wanting to use him to organize and pacify the Indonesians. Sukarno, on the other hand, wanted to use the Japanese to gain independence for Indonesia: "The Lord be praised, God showed me the way; in that valley of the Ngarai I said: Yes, Independent Indonesia can only be achieved with Dai Nippon...For the first time in all my life, I saw myself in the mirror of Asia." In July 1942, Sukarno was sent back to Jakarta, where he re-united with other nationalist leaders recently released by the Japanese, including Hatta. There, he met the Japanese commander General Hitoshi Imamura, who asked Sukarno and other nationalists to galvanise support from the Indonesian populace to aid the Japanese war effort.

Sukarno was willing to support the Japanese, in exchange for a platform for himself to spread nationalist ideas to the mass population. The Japanese, on the other hand, needed Indonesia's workforce and natural resources to help its war effort. The Japanese recruited millions of people, mainly from Java, to be forced labour called romusha in Japanese. They were forced to build railways, airfields, and other facilities for the Japanese within Indonesia and as far away as Burma. Additionally, the Japanese requisitioned rice and other food produced by Indonesian peasants to supply their troops, while forcing the peasantry to cultivate castor oil plants to be used as aviation fuel and lubricants.

To gain cooperation from the Indonesian population and to prevent resistance to these measures, the Japanese put Sukarno as head of the 3A Japanese propaganda movement or the Tiga-A mass organization movement. In March 1943, the Japanese formed a new organization called Poesat Tenaga Rakjat (POETERA/Center of People's Power) under Sukarno, Hatta, Ki Hadjar Dewantara, and KH Mas Mansjoer. These organizations aimed to galvanise popular support for recruitment of romusha, to requisition of food products, and to promote pro-Japanese and anti-Western sentiments amongst Indonesians. Sukarno coined the term Amerika kita setrika, Inggris kita linggis ("Let's iron America, and bludgeon the British") to promote anti-Allied sentiments. In later years, Sukarno was lastingly ashamed of his role with the romusha. Additionally, food requisitioning by the Japanese caused widespread famine in Java, which killed more than one million people in 1944–1945. In his view, these were necessary sacrifices to be made to allow for the future independence of Indonesia. He also was involved with the formation of Defenders of the Homeland (Pembela Tanah Air; PETA) and Heiho (Indonesian volunteer army troops) via speeches broadcast on the Japanese radio and loudspeaker networks across Java and Sumatra. By mid-1945 these units numbered around two million and were preparing to defeat any Allied forces sent to re-take Java.

1966 ABC report examining Sukarno's alliance between imperial Japan and the Indonesian nationalist movement

In the meantime, Sukarno eventually divorced Inggit, who refused to accept her husband's wish for polygamy. She was provided with a house in Bandung and a pension for the rest of her life. In 1943, he married Fatmawati. They lived in a house in Jalan Pegangsaan Timur No. 56, confiscated from its previous Dutch owners and presented to Sukarno by the Japanese. This house would later be the venue of the Proclamation of Indonesian Independence in 1945.

On 10 November 1943, Sukarno and Hatta were sent on a 17-day tour of Japan, where they were decorated by Emperor Hirohito and wined and dined in the house of Prime Minister Hideki Tojo in Tokyo. On 7 September 1944, with the war going badly for the Japanese, Prime Minister Kuniaki Koiso promised independence for Indonesia, although no date was set. This announcement was seen, according to the US official history, as immense vindication for Sukarno's apparent collaboration with the Japanese. The USA at the time considered Sukarno one of the "foremost collaborationist leaders". On the same month, Sukarno also had a heated debate with Tan Malaka regarding the nature of Indonesian independence and Japanese collaboration during a propaganda tour at Bayah.

=== Investigating Committee for Preparatory Work for Independence ===
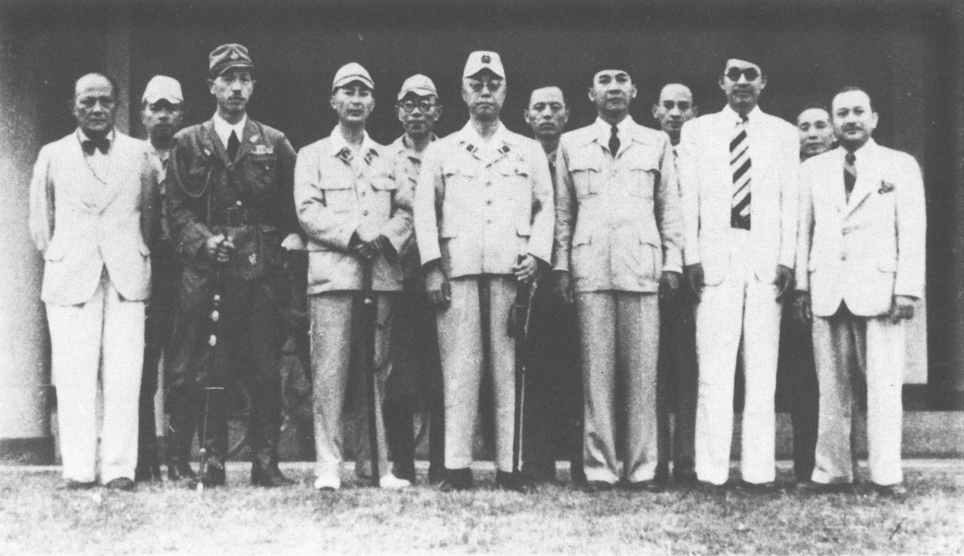
Sukarno during a visit to Makassar, 30 April 1945

On 29 April 1945, when the Philippines were liberated by American forces, the Japanese allowed for the establishment of the Investigating Committee for Preparatory Work for Independence (Badan Penyelidik Usaha-Usaha Persiapan Kemerdekaan, BPUPK), a quasi-legislature consisting of 67 representatives from most ethnic groups in Indonesia. Sukarno was appointed as head of the BPUPK and was tasked to lead discussions to prepare the basis of a future Indonesian state. To provide a common and acceptable platform to unite the various squabbling factions in the BPUPK, Sukarno formulated his ideological thinking developed over the previous twenty years into five principles. On 1 June 1945, he introduced a set of five principles, known as pancasila, during the joint session of the BPUPK held in the former Volksraad Building (now called the Pancasila Building).

Pancasila, as presented by Sukarno during the BPUPK speech, consisted of five principles which Sukarno saw as commonly shared by all Indonesians:

1. Nationalism, whereby a united Indonesian state would stretch from Sabang to Merauke, encompassing all former Dutch East Indies
2. Internationalism, meaning Indonesia is to appreciate human rights and contribute to world peace, and should not fall into chauvinistic fascism such as displayed by Nazis with their belief in the racial superiority of Aryans
3. Democracy, which Sukarno believed has always been in the blood of Indonesians through the practice of consensus-seeking (musyawarah untuk mufakat), an Indonesian-style democracy different from Western-style liberalism
4. Social justice, a form of populist socialism in economics with Marxist-style opposition to free capitalism. Social justice also intended to provide an equal share of the economy to all Indonesians, as opposed to the complete economic domination by the Dutch and Chinese during the colonial period
5. Belief in God, whereby all religions are treated equally and have religious freedom. Sukarno saw Indonesians as spiritual and religious people, but in essence tolerant towards different religious beliefs

On 22 June, the Islamic and nationalist elements of the BPUPK created a small committee of nine (Indonesian: Panitia Sembilan), which formulated Sukarno's ideas into the five-point Pancasila, in a document known as the Jakarta Charter:

1. Belief in one and only Almighty God with obligation for Muslims to adhere to Islamic law (Ketuhanan dengan kewajiban menjalankan syariat Islam bagi para pemeluknya)
2. Just and civilised humanity (Kemanusiaan yang adil dan beradab)
3. Unity of Indonesia (Persatuan Indonesia)
4. Democracy through inner wisdom and representative consensus-building (Kerakyatan yang dipimpin oleh hikmat kebijaksanaan dalam musyawarah perwakilan)
5. Social justice for all Indonesians (Keadilan bagi seluruh rakyat Indonesia)

Due to pressure from the Islamic element, the first principle mentioned the obligation for Muslims to practice Islamic law (sharia). However, the final Sila as contained in the 1945 Constitution which was put into effect on 18 August 1945, excluded the reference to Islamic law for the sake of national unity. The elimination of sharia was done by Hatta based upon a request by Christian representative Alexander Andries Maramis, and after consultation with moderate Islamic representatives Teuku Mohammad Hassan, Kasman Singodimedjo, and Ki Bagoes Hadikoesoemo.

=== Preparatory Committee for Indonesian Independence ===
On 7 August 1945, the Japanese allowed the formation of a smaller Preparatory Committee for Indonesian Independence (Panitia Persiapan kemerdekaan Indonesia, PPKI), a 21-person committee tasked with creating the specific governmental structure of the future Indonesian state. On 9 August, the top leaders of PPKI (Sukarno, Hatta and KRT Radjiman Wediodiningrat), were summoned by the commander-in-chief of Japan's Southern Expeditionary Forces, Field Marshal Hisaichi Terauchi, to Da Lat, 100 km from Saigon. Terauchi gave Sukarno the freedom to proceed with preparation for Indonesian independence, free of Japanese interference. After much wining and dining, Sukarno's entourage was flown back to Jakarta on 14 August. Unbeknownst to the guests, atomic bombs had been dropped on Hiroshima and Nagasaki, and the Japanese were preparing for surrender.

=== Japanese surrender ===
The following day, on 15 August, the Japanese declared their acceptance of the Potsdam Declaration terms and unconditionally surrendered to the Allies. On the afternoon of that day, Sukarno received this information from leaders of youth groups and members of PETA Chairul Saleh, Soekarni, and Wikana, who had been listening to Western radio broadcasts. They urged Sukarno to declare Indonesian independence immediately, while the Japanese were in confusion and before the arrival of Allied forces. Faced with this quick turn of events, Sukarno procrastinated. He feared a bloodbath due to hostile response from the Japanese to such a move and was concerned with prospects of future Allied retribution.

=== Kidnapping incident ===
On the early morning of 16 August, the three youth leaders, impatient with Sukarno's indecision, kidnapped him from his house and brought him to a small house in Rengasdengklok, Karawang, owned by a Chinese family and occupied by PETA. There they gained Sukarno's commitment to declare independence the next day. That night, the youths drove Sukarno back to the house of Admiral Tadashi Maeda, the Japanese naval liaison officer in the Menteng area of Jakarta, who sympathised with Indonesian independence. There, he and his assistant Sajoeti Melik prepared the text of the Proclamation of Indonesian Independence.

== Indonesian National Revolution ==
=== Proclamation of Indonesian Independence ===
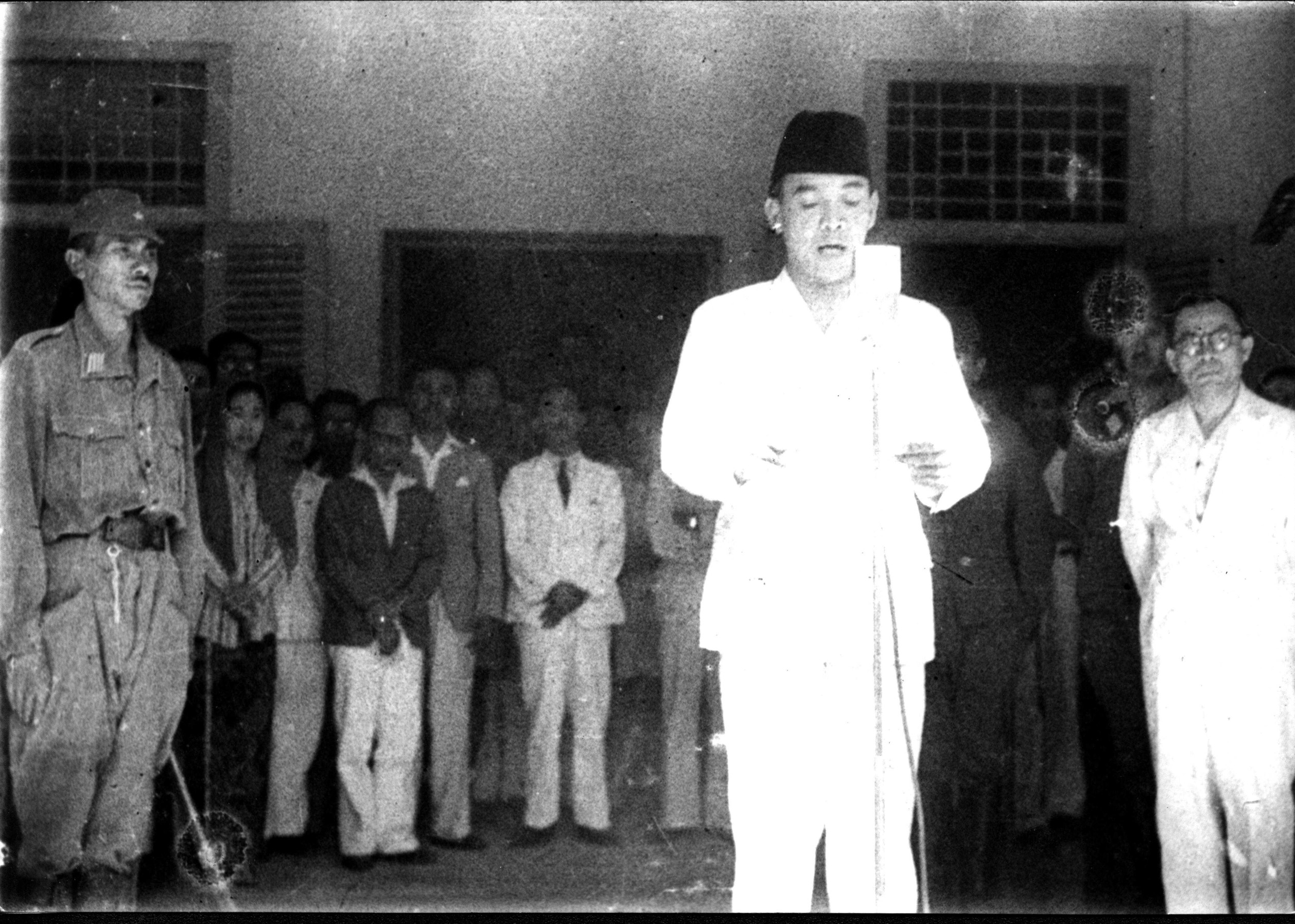
Sukarno, accompanied by Mohammad Hatta (right), declaring the independence of Indonesia.

In the early morning of 17 August 1945, Sukarno returned to his house at Jalan Pegangsaan Timur No. 56, where Hatta joined him. Throughout the morning, impromptu leaflets printed by PETA and youth elements informed the population of the impending proclamation. Finally, at 10 am, Sukarno and Hatta stepped to the front porch, where Sukarno declared the independence of the Republic of Indonesia in front of a crowd of 500 people. This most historic of buildings was later ordered to be demolished by Sukarno himself, without any apparent reason.

On the following day, 18 August, the PPKI declared the basic governmental structure of the new Republic of Indonesia:

1. Electing Sukarno and Hatta as president and vice president, respectively.
2. Putting into effect the 1945 Indonesian Constitution, which by this time excluded any reference to Islamic law.
3. Establishing a Central Indonesian National Committee (Komite Nasional Indonesia Poesat, KNIP) to assist the president before an election of a parliament.

Sukarno's vision for the 1945 Indonesian constitution comprised the Pancasila (five principles). Sukarno's political philosophy was mainly a fusion of elements of Marxism, nationalism and Islam. This is reflected in a proposition of his version of Pancasila he proposed to the BPUPK in a speech on 1 June 1945.

Sukarno argued that all of the principles of the nation could be summarised in the phrase gotong royong. The Indonesian parliament, founded on the basis of this original (and subsequently revised) constitution, proved all but ungovernable. This was due to irreconcilable differences between various social, political, religious and ethnic factions.

=== Revolution and Bersiap ===
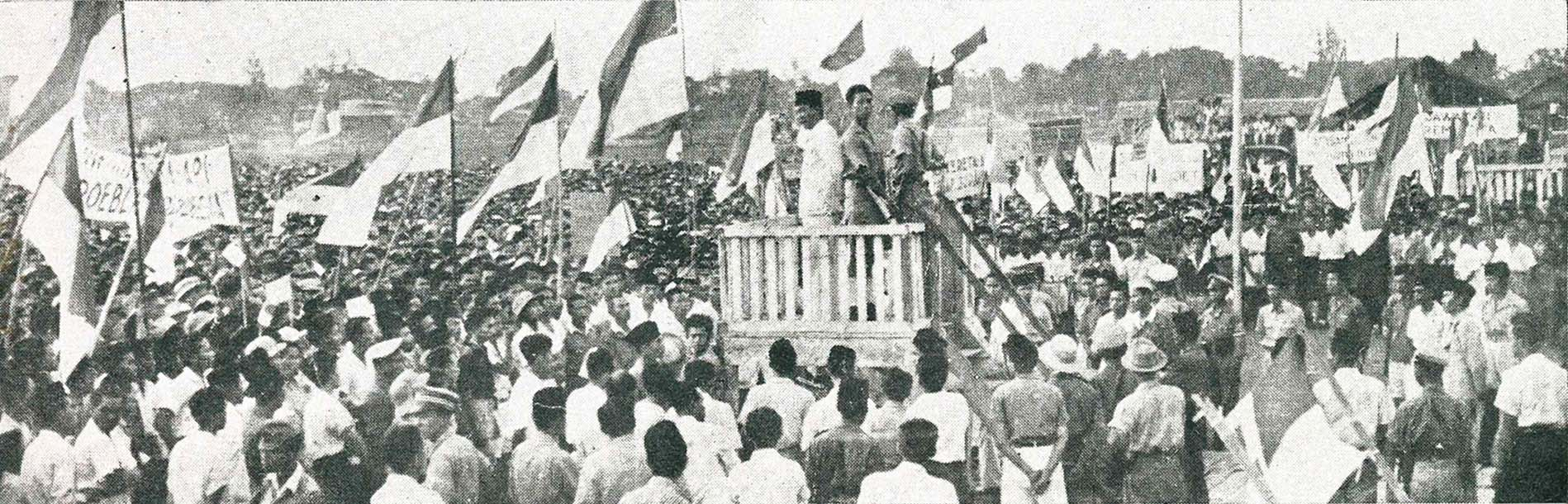
Sukarno speaking on a rostrum at Ikada Square, attended by a million

In the days following the proclamation, the news of Indonesian independence was spread by radio, newspaper, leaflets, and word of mouth despite attempts by the Japanese soldiers to suppress the news. On 19 September, Sukarno addressed a crowd of one million people at the Ikada Field of Jakarta (now part of Merdeka Square) to commemorate one month of independence, indicating the strong level of popular support for the new Republic, at least on Java and Sumatra. In these two islands, the Sukarno government quickly established governmental control while the remaining Japanese mostly retreated to their barracks awaiting the arrival of Allied forces. This period was marked by constant attacks by armed groups on anyone who was perceived to oppose Indonesian independence. The most serious cases were the Social Revolutions in Aceh and North Sumatera, where large numbers of Acehnese and Malay aristocrats were killed, and the "Three Regions Affair" in the northwestern coast of Central Java. These bloody incidents continued until late 1945 to early 1946, and began to peter out as republican authorities began to exert and consolidate control.

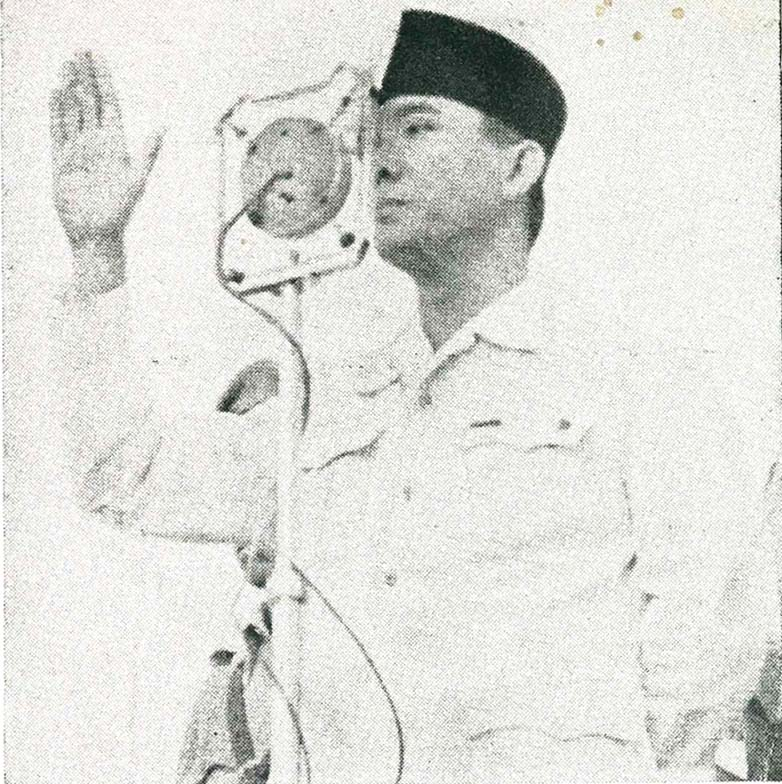
Sukarno readying to deliver his fiery speech at Ikada Square.

Sukarno's government initially postponed the formation of a national army, for fear of antagonizing the Allied occupation forces and their doubt over whether they would have been able to form an adequate military apparatus to maintain control of seized territory. The members of various militia groups formed during Japanese occupation such as the disbanded PETA and Heiho, at that time were encouraged to join the BKR - Badan Keamanan Rakjat (The People's Security Organization), itself a subordinate of the "War Victims Assistance Organization". It was only in October 1945 that the BKR was reformed into the TKR – Tentara Keamanan Rakjat (People's Security Army) in response to the increasing Allied and Dutch presence in Indonesia. The TKR armed themselves mostly by attacking Japanese troops and confiscating their weapons.

Due to the sudden transfer of Java and Sumatra from General Douglas MacArthur's American-controlled Southwest Pacific Command to Lord Louis Mountbatten's British-controlled Southeast Asian Command, the first Allied soldiers (1st Battalion of Seaforth Highlanders) did not arrive in Jakarta until late September 1945. British forces began to occupy major Indonesian cities in October 1945. The commander of the British 23rd Division, Lieutenant General Sir Philip Christison, set up command in the former governor-general's palace in Jakarta. Christison stated that he intended to free all Allied prisoners-of-war and to allow the return of Indonesia to its pre-war status, as a colony of the Netherlands. The republican government were willing to cooperate with the release and repatriation of Allied civilians and military POWs, setting up the Committee for the Repatriation of Japanese and Allied Prisoners of War and Internees (Panitia Oeroesan Pengangkoetan Djepang dan APWI, POPDA) for this purpose. POPDA, in cooperation with the British, repatriated more than 70,000 Japanese and Allied POWs and internees by the end of 1946. However, due to the relative weakness of the military of the Republic of Indonesia, Sukarno sought independence by gaining international recognition for his new country rather than engage in battle with British and Dutch military forces.

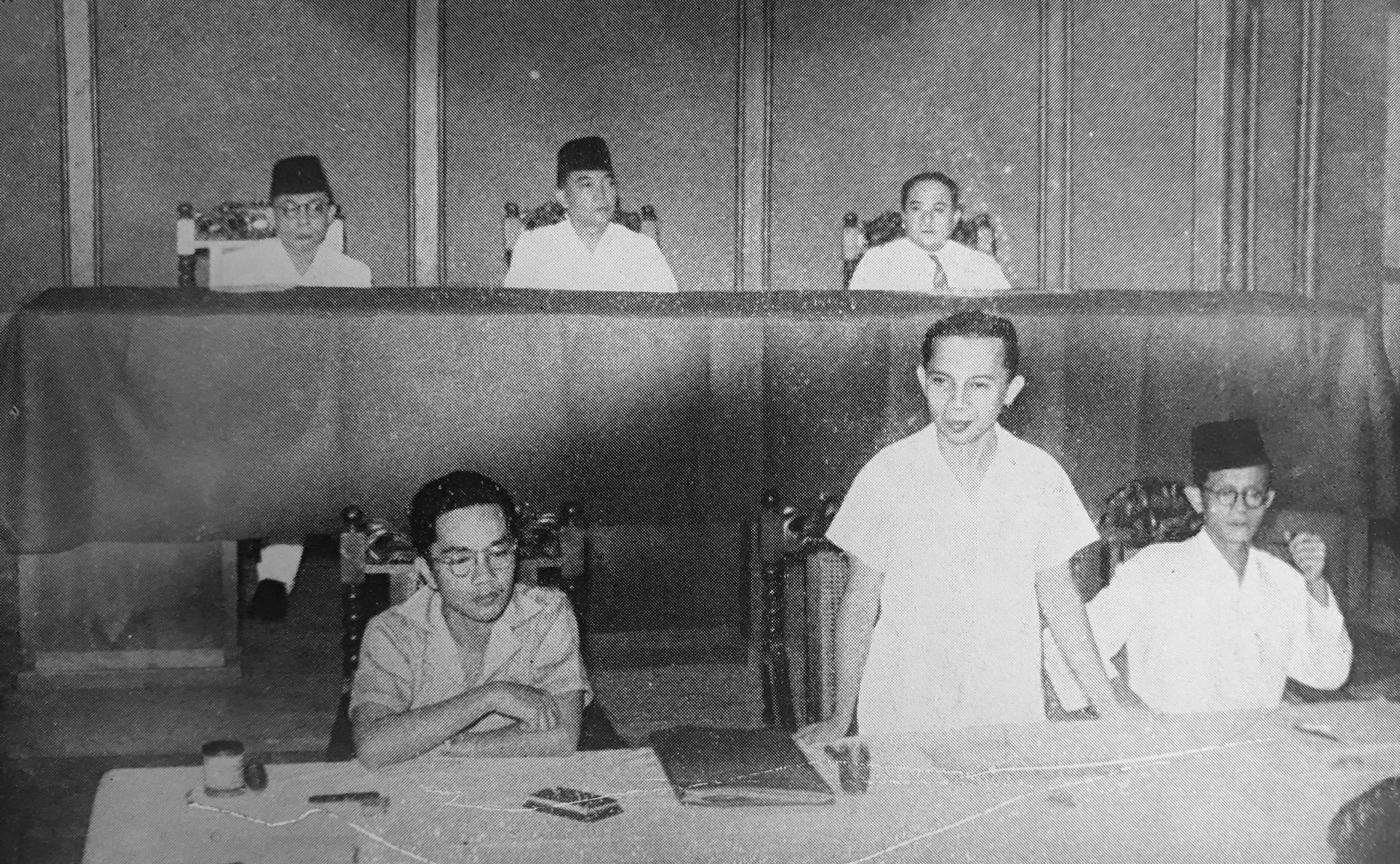
Indonesian Prime Minister Sutan Sjahrir opening the first plenary session of the Central Indonesian National Committee (KNIP), 16 October 1945

Sukarno was aware that his history as a Japanese collaborator and his leadership in the Japanese-approved PUTERA during the occupation would make the Western countries distrustful of him. To help gain international recognition as well as to accommodate domestic demands for representation, Sukarno "allowed" the formation of a parliamentary system of government, whereby a prime minister controlled day-to-day affairs of the government, while Sukarno as president remained as a figurehead. The prime minister and his cabinet would be responsible to the Central Indonesian National Committee instead of the president. On 14 November 1945, Sukarno appointed Sutan Sjahrir, a European-educated politician who was never involved with the Japanese occupation authorities, as his first prime minister.

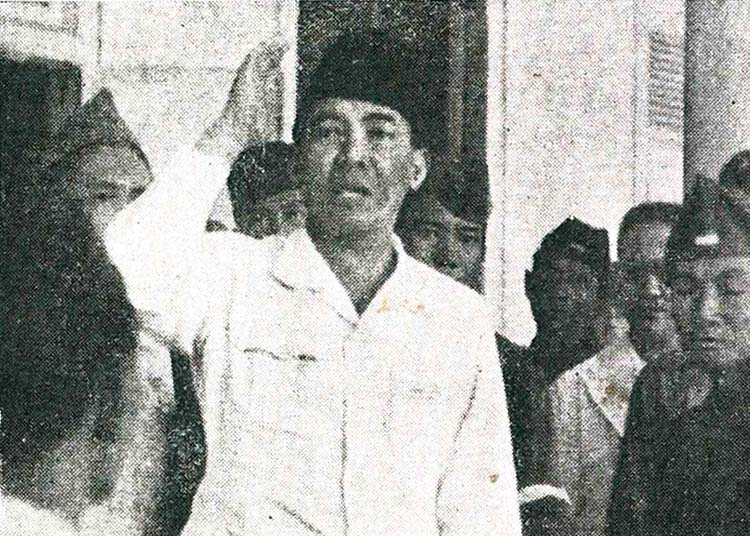
Sukarno speaking to Indonesian soldiers in Surabaya in the prelude to the Battle of Surabaya

In late 1945, Dutch administrators who led the Dutch East Indies government-in-exile and soldiers who had fought the Japanese began to return under the name of Netherlands Indies Civil Administration (NICA), with the protection of the British. They were led by Hubertus Johannes van Mook, a colonial administrator who had evacuated to Brisbane, Australia. Dutch soldiers who had been POWs under the Japanese were released and rearmed. Shooting between these Dutch soldiers and police supporting the new republican government soon developed. This soon escalated to armed conflict between the newly constituted republican forces aided by a myriad of pro-independence fighters and the Dutch and British forces. On 10 November, a full-scale battle broke out in Surabaya between the 49th Infantry Brigade of the British Indian Army and Indonesian nationalist militias. The British-Indian force were supported by air and naval forces. Some 300 Indian soldiers were killed (including their commander Brigadier Aubertin Walter Sothern Mallaby), as were thousands of nationalist militiamen and other Indonesians. Shootouts broke out with alarming regularity in Jakarta, including an attempted assassination of Prime Minister Sjahrir by Dutch gunmen. To avoid this menace, Sukarno and the majority of his government left for the safety of Yogyakarta on 4 January 1946. There, the republican government received protection and full support from Sultan Hamengkubuwono IX. Yogyakarta would remain as the Republic's capital until the end of the war in 1949. Sjahrir remained in Jakarta to conduct negotiations with the British.

The initial series of battles in late 1945 and early 1946 left the British in control of major port cities on Java and Sumatra. During the Japanese occupation, the Outer Islands (excluding Java and Sumatra) were occupied by the Japanese Navy (Kaigun), who did not allow for political mobilisation of the islanders. Consequently, there was little republican activity in these islands post-proclamation. Australian and Dutch forces were able to quickly take control of these islands without much fighting by the end of 1945 (excluding the resistance of I Gusti Ngurah Rai in Bali, the insurgency in South Sulawesi, and fighting in Hulu Sungai area of South Kalimantan). Meanwhile, the hinterland areas of Java and Sumatera remained under republican control.

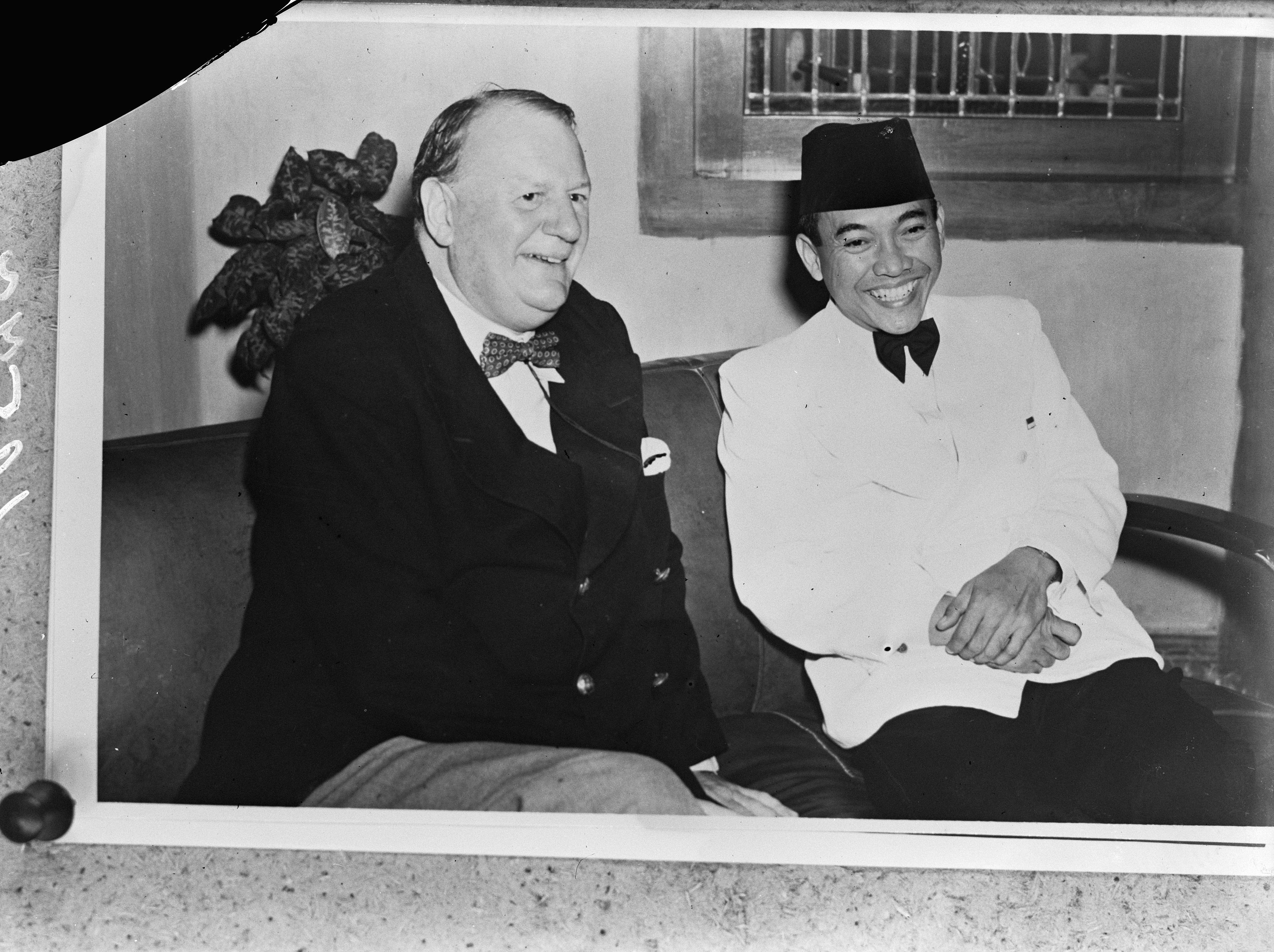
Miles Lampson, 1st Baron Killearn and Ir. Soekarno attending the Linggadjati Agreement

Eager to pull its soldiers out of Indonesia, the British allowed for large-scale infusion of Dutch forces into the country throughout 1946. By November 1946, all British soldiers had been withdrawn from Indonesia. They were replaced with more than 150,000 Dutch soldiers. The British sent Lord Archibald Clark Kerr, 1st Baron Inverchapel and Miles Lampson, 1st Baron Killearn to bring the Dutch and Indonesians to the negotiating table. The result of these negotiations was the Linggadjati Agreement signed in November 1946, where the Dutch acknowledged de facto republican sovereignty over Java, Sumatera, and Madura. In exchange, the republicans were willing to discuss a future Commonwealth-like United Kingdom of Netherlands and Indonesia.

=== Linggadjati Agreement and Operation Product ===
==== Linggadjati Agreement ====
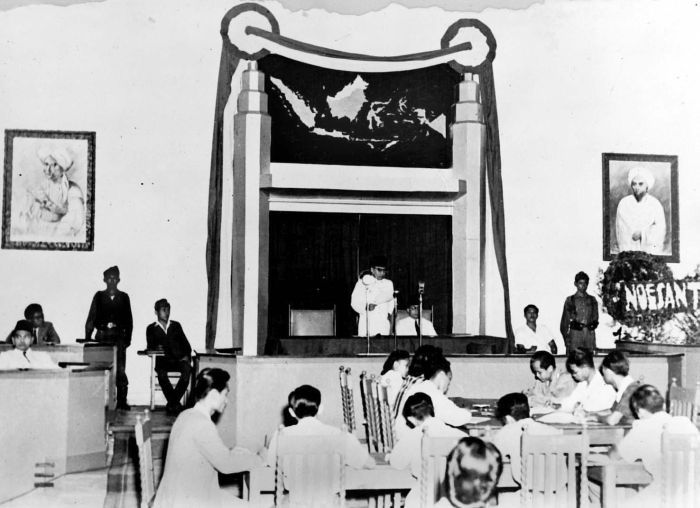
Sukarno addressing the KNIP (parliament) in Malang, March 1947

Sukarno's decision to negotiate with the Dutch was met with strong opposition by various Indonesian factions. Tan Malaka, a communist politician, organized these groups into a united front called the Persatoean Perdjoangan (PP). PP offered a "Minimum Program" which called for complete independence, nationalisation of all foreign properties, and rejection of all negotiations until all foreign troops are withdrawn. These programmes received widespread popular support, including from armed forces commander General Sudirman. On 4 July 1946, military units linked with PP kidnapped Prime Minister Sjahrir who was visiting Yogyakarta. Sjahrir was leading the negotiation with the Dutch. Sukarno, after successfully influencing Sudirman, managed to secure the release of Sjahrir and the arrest of Tan Malaka and other PP leaders. Disapproval of Linggadjati terms within the KNIP led Sukarno to issue a decree doubling KNIP membership by including many pro-agreement appointed members. As a consequence, KNIP ratified the Linggadjati Agreement in March 1947.

==== Operation Product ====
On 21 July 1947, the Linggadjati Agreement was broken by the Dutch, who launched Operatie Product, a massive military invasion into republican-held territories. Although the newly reconstituted TNI was unable to offer significant military resistance, the blatant violation by the Dutch of an internationally brokered agreement outraged world opinion. International pressure forced the Dutch to halt their invasion force in August 1947. Sjahrir, who had been replaced as prime minister by Amir Sjarifuddin, was flown out of Indonesia on 24 July by Biju Patnaik at the behest of Indian leader Jawaharlal Nehru to India and then flew onwards to New York City to appeal the Indonesian case in front of the United Nations. The UN Security Council issued a resolution calling for an immediate ceasefire and appointed a Good Offices Committee (GOC) to oversee the ceasefire. The GOC, based in Jakarta, consisted of delegations from Australia (led by Richard Kirby, chosen by Indonesia), Belgium (led by Paul van Zeeland, chosen by the Netherlands), and the United States (led by Frank Porter Graham, neutral).

The republic was now under firm Dutch military stranglehold, with the Dutch military occupying West Java, and the northern coast of Central Java and East Java, along with the key productive areas of Sumatra. Additionally, the Dutch navy blockaded republican areas from supplies of vital food, medicine, and weapons. As a consequence, Prime Minister Amir Sjarifuddin had little choice but to sign the Renville Agreement on 17 January 1948, which acknowledged Dutch control over areas taken during Operatie Product, while the republicans pledged to withdraw all forces that remained on the other side of the ceasefire line ("Van Mook Line"). Meanwhile, the Dutch begin to organize puppet states in the areas under their occupation, to counter republican influence utilising ethnic diversity of Indonesia.

=== Renville agreement and Madiun affair ===
The signing of the highly disadvantageous Renville Agreement caused even greater instability within the republican political structure. In Dutch-occupied West Java, Darul Islam guerrillas under Sekarmadji Maridjan Kartosuwirjo maintained their anti-Dutch resistance and repealed any loyalty to the Republic; they caused a bloody insurgency in West Java and other areas in the first decades of independence. Prime Minister Sjarifuddin, who signed the agreement, was forced to resign in January 1948 and was replaced by Hatta. Hatta's cabinet's policy of rationalising the armed forces by demobilising large numbers of armed groups that proliferated the republican areas also caused severe disaffection. Leftist political elements, led by resurgent Indonesian Communist Party (PKI) under Musso took advantage of public disaffections by launching a rebellion in Madiun, East Java, on 18 September 1948. Bloody fighting continued during late-September until the end of October 1948, when the last communist bands were defeated, and Musso shot dead. The communists had overestimated their potential to oppose the strong appeal of Sukarno amongst the population.

=== Operation Kraai and exile ===
==== Invasion and exile ====
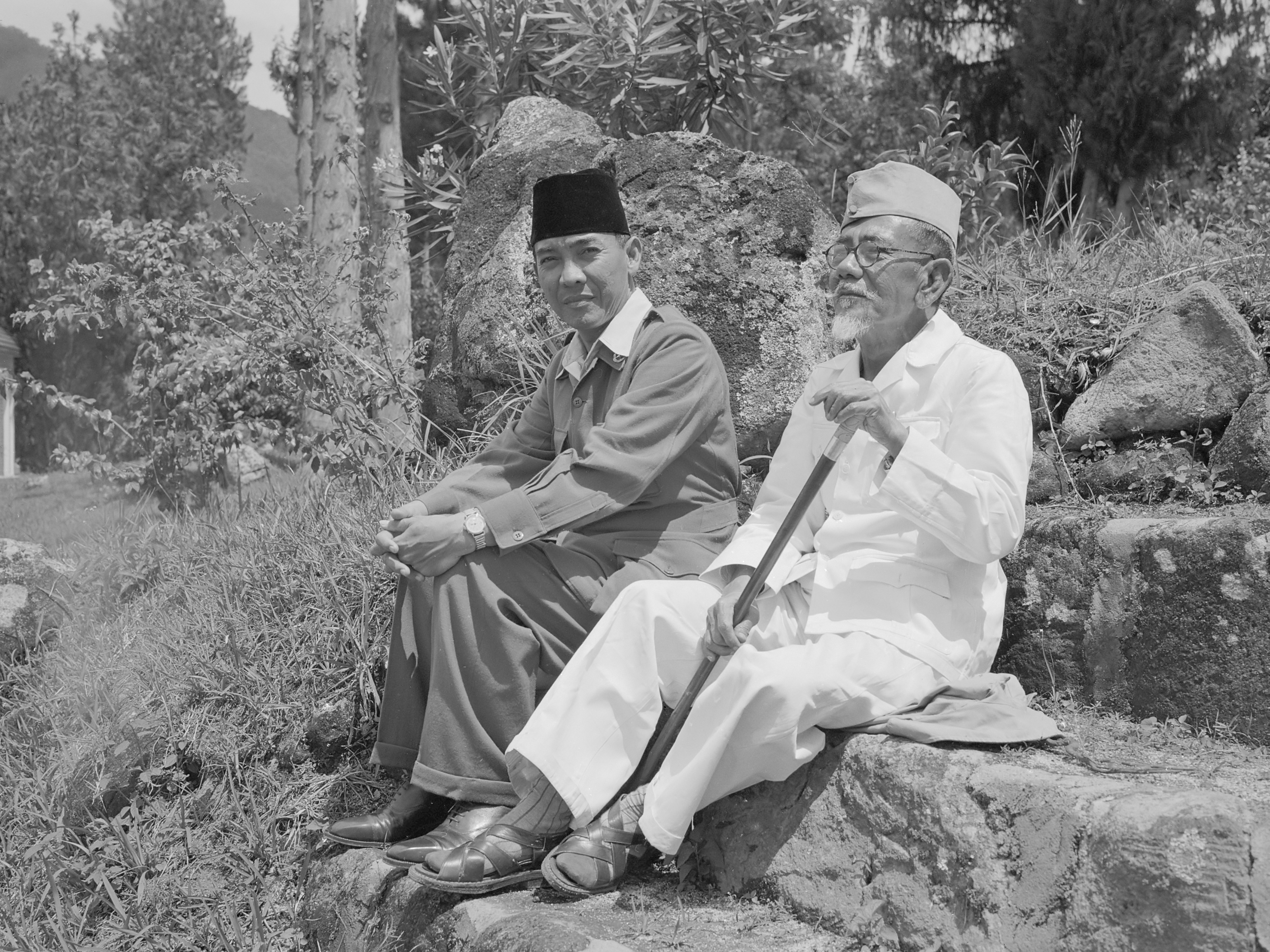
Sukarno and Foreign Minister Agus Salim in Dutch custody, Parapat 1949.

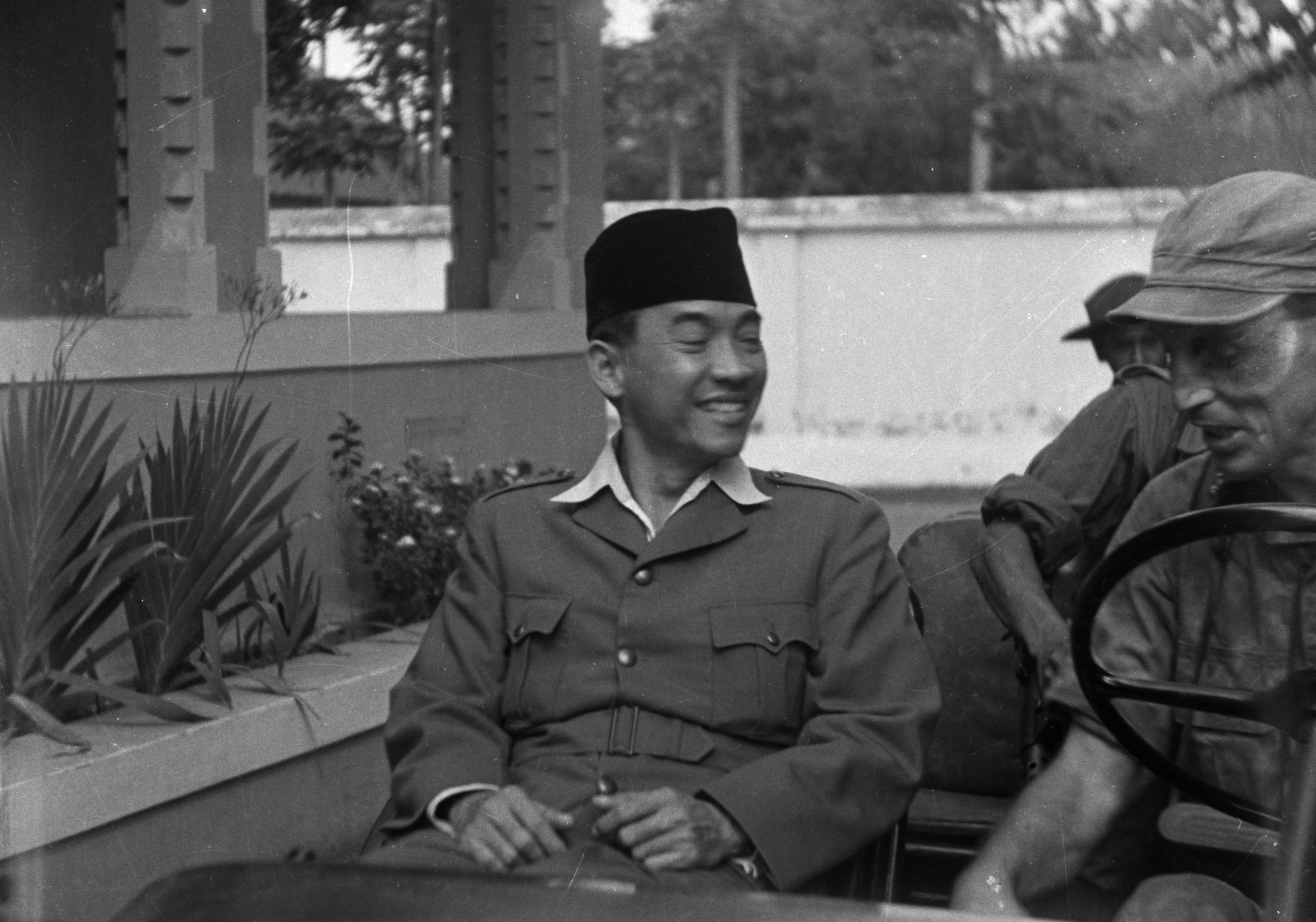
Sukarno, seated in a jeep, defiantly laughs at a Dutch lieutenant during his arrest

On 19 December 1948, to take advantage of the republic's weak position following the communist rebellion, the Dutch launched Operation Kraai, a second military invasion designed to crush the Republic once and for all. The invasion was initiated with an airborne assault on the republican capital Yogyakarta. Sukarno ordered the armed forces under Sudirman to launch a guerrilla campaign in the countryside, while he and other key leaders such as Hatta and Sjahrir allowed themselves to be taken prisoner by the Dutch. To ensure continuity of government, Sukarno sent a telegram to Sjarifuddin, providing him with the mandate to lead an Emergency Government of the Republic of Indonesia (PDRI), based on the unoccupied hinterlands of West Sumatra, a position he kept until Sukarno was released in June 1949. The Dutch sent Sukarno and other captured republican leaders to captivity in Parapat, in Dutch-occupied part of North Sumatra and later to the island of Bangka.

==== Aftermath ====
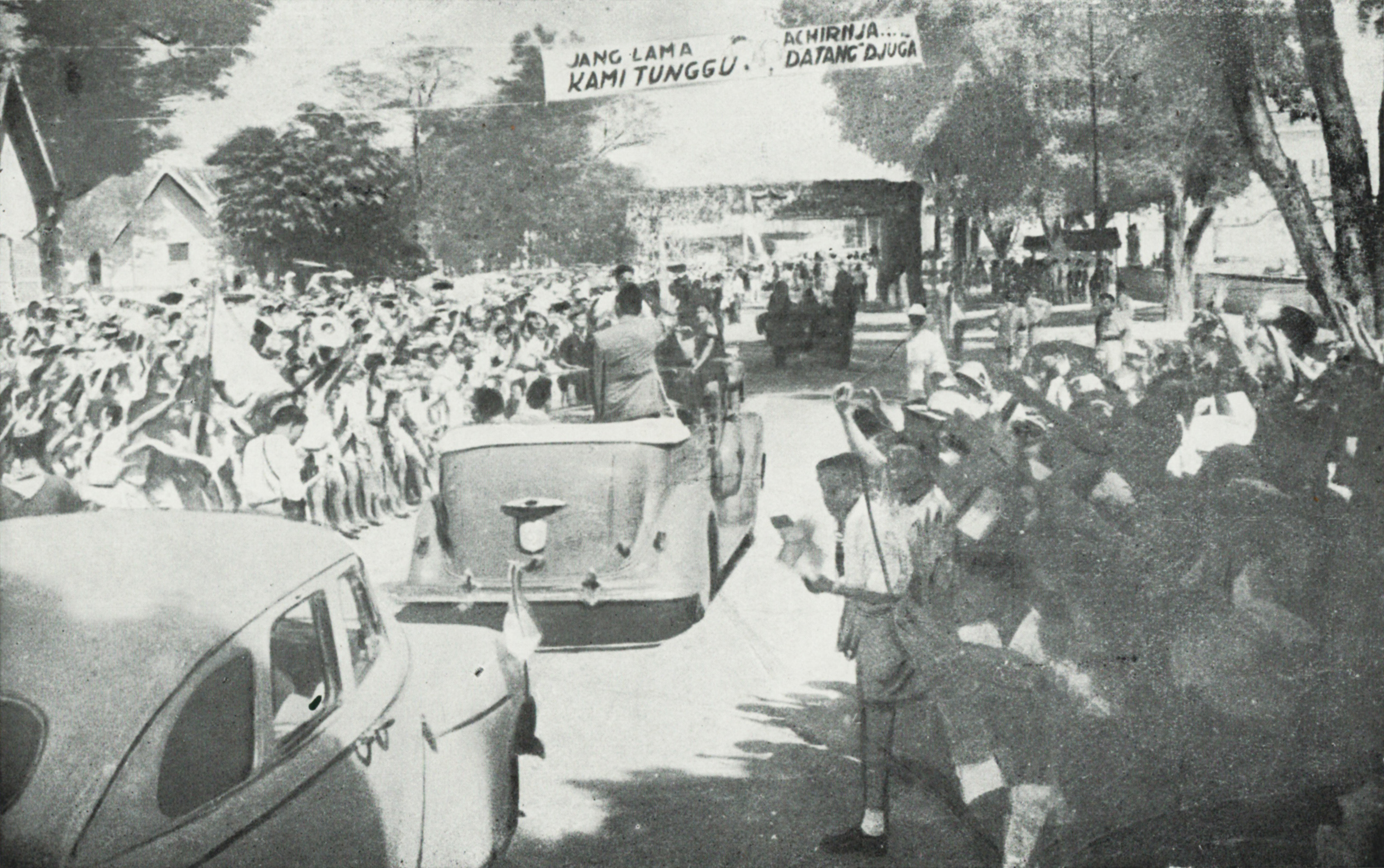
Sukarno's return to Yogyakarta in June 1949. The banner reads, "The one we've been waiting for, finally arrives."

The second Dutch invasion caused even more international outrage. The United States, impressed by Indonesia's ability to defeat the 1948 communist challenge without outside help, threatened to cut off Marshall Aid funds to the Netherlands if military operations in Indonesia continued. TNI did not disintegrate and continued to wage guerrilla resistance against the Dutch, most notably the assault on Dutch-held Yogyakarta led by Lieutenant Colonel Suharto on 1 March 1949. Consequently, the Dutch were forced to sign the Roem–Van Roijen Agreement on 7 May 1949. According to this treaty, the Dutch released the republican leadership and returned the area surrounding Yogyakarta to republican control in June 1949. This was followed by the Dutch-Indonesian Round Table Conference held in The Hague which led to the complete transfer of sovereignty by the Queen Juliana of the Netherlands to Indonesia, on 27 December 1949. On that day, Sukarno flew from Yogyakarta to Jakarta, making a triumphant speech at the steps of the governor-general's palace, immediately renamed the Merdeka Palace ("Independence Palace").

== President of the United States of Indonesia ==
Sukarno's inauguration as president (17 December 1949, commentary in Dutch)

At this time, as part of a compromise with the Dutch, Indonesia adopted a new federal constitution that made the country a federal state called the Republic of United States of Indonesia (Indonesian: Republik Indonesia Serikat, RIS), consisting of the Republic of Indonesia whose borders were determined by the "Van Mook Line", along with the six states and nine autonomous territories created by the Dutch. During the first half of 1950, these states gradually dissolved themselves as the Dutch military that previously propped them up was withdrawn. In August 1950, with the last state, the State of East Indonesia dissolving itself, Sukarno declared a Unitary Republic of Indonesia based on the newly formulated provisional constitution of 1950.

== Liberal Democracy period (1950–1959) ==
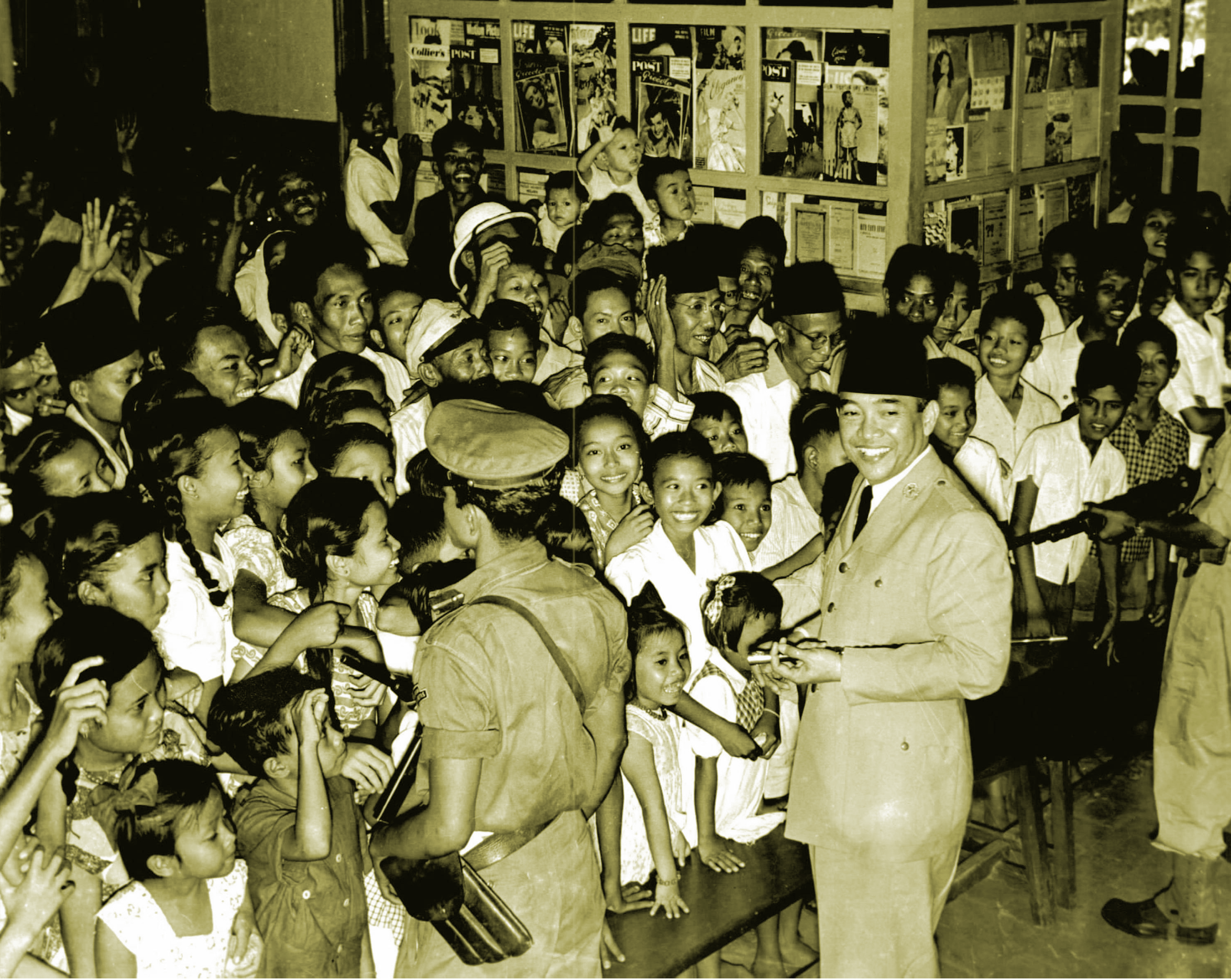
Sukarno greeted by children and Surabaya residents during his arrival at Surabaya Gubeng railway station, 22 May 1952

Both the Federal Constitution of 1949 and the Provisional Constitution of 1950 were parliamentary in nature, where executive authority lay with the prime minister, and which, on paper, limited presidential power. However, even with his formally reduced role, he commanded a good deal of moral authority as Father of the Nation.

=== Instability and rebellions ===
The first years of parliamentary democracy proved to be very unstable for Indonesia. Cabinets fell in rapid succession due to the sharp differences between the various political parties within the newly-appointed parliament (Dewan Perwakilan Rakjat, DPR). There were severe disagreements concerning the future path of the Indonesian state, between nationalists who wanted a secular state (led by PNI, first established by Sukarno), Islamists who wanted an Islamic state (led by the Masyumi Party), and communists who wanted a communist state (led by the PKI, which only in 1951 again became allowed to operate). On the economic front, there was severe dissatisfaction with continuing economic domination by large Dutch corporations and the ethnic Chinese.

==== Darul Islam rebels ====
The Darul Islam rebels under Kartosuwirjo in West Java refused to acknowledge Sukarno's authority and declared an NII (Negara Islam Indonesia - Islamic State of Indonesia) in August 1949. Rebellions in support of Darul Islam also broke out in South Sulawesi in 1951, and in Aceh in 1953. Meanwhile, pro-federalist members of the disbanded KNIL launched failed rebellions in Bandung (APRA rebellion of 1950), in Makassar in 1950, and Ambon (Republic of South Maluku revolt of 1950).

==== Division in the military ====
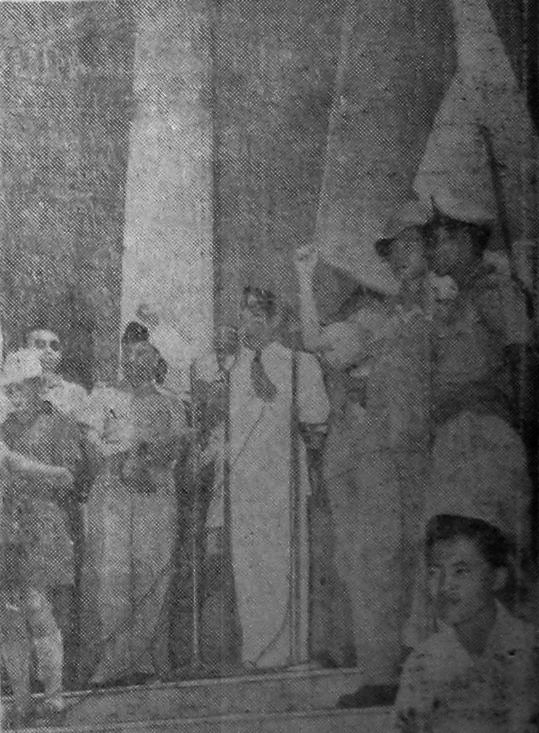
Sukarno speaking to protestors, 20 October 1952

Additionally, the military was torn by hostilities between officers originating from the colonial-era KNIL, who wished for a small and elite professional military, and the overwhelming majority of soldiers who started their careers in the Japanese-formed PETA, who were afraid of being discharged and were more known for nationalist-zeal over professionalism.

On 17 October 1952, the leaders of the former-KNIL faction, Army Chief Colonel Abdul Haris Nasution and Armed Forces Chief-of-Staff Tahi Bonar Simatupang mobilised their troops in a show of force. Protesting against attempts by the DPR to interfere in military business on behalf of the former PETA faction of the military, Nasution and Simatupang had their troops surround the Merdeka Palace and point their tank turrets at the building. Their demand for Sukarno was that the current DPR be dismissed. For this cause, Nasution and Simatupang also mobilised civilian protesters. Sukarno came out of the palace and convinced both the soldiers and the civilians to go home. Nasution and Simatupang were later dismissed. Nasution, however, would be re-appointed as Army Chief after reconciling with Sukarno in 1955.

=== Legislative elections ===
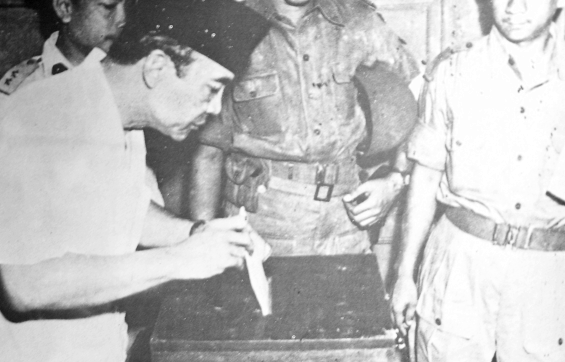
Sukarno casting his vote at the 1955 elections

The 1955 elections produced a new parliament and a constitutional assembly. The election results showed equal support for the antagonistic powers of the PNI, Masyumi, Nahdlatul Ulama, and PKI parties. With no faction controlling a clear majority, domestic political instability continued unabated. Talks in the Constitutional Assembly to write a new constitution met with deadlock over the issue of whether to include Islamic law.

Sukarno came to resent his figurehead position and the increasing disorder of the country's political life. Claiming that Western-style parliamentary democracy was unsuitable for Indonesia, he called for a system of "guided democracy," which he claimed was based on indigenous principles of governance. Sukarno argued that at the village level, important questions were decided by lengthy deliberation designed to achieve a consensus, under the guidance of village elders. He believed it should be the model for the entire nation, with the president taking the role assumed by village elders. He proposed a government based not only on political parties but on "functional groups" composed of the nation's essential elements, which would together form a National Council, through which a national consensus could express itself under presidential guidance.

Vice President Hatta was strongly opposed to Sukarno's guided democracy concept. Citing this and other irreconcilable differences, Hatta resigned from his position in December 1956. His retirement sent a shockwave across Indonesia, particularly among the non-Javanese, who viewed Hatta as their representative in a Javanese-dominated government.

=== Military takeovers and martial law ===
==== Regional military takeovers ====
From December 1956 to January 1957, regional military commanders in the provinces of North, Central, and South Sumatra took over local government control. They declared a series of military councils which were to run their respective areas and refused to accept orders from Jakarta. A similar regional military movement took control of North Sulawesi in March 1957. They demanded the elimination of communist influence in government, an equal share in government revenues, and reinstatement of the former Sukarno-Hatta duumvirate.

==== Declaration of martial law ====
Faced with this serious challenge to the unity of the republic, Sukarno declared martial law (Staat van Oorlog en Beleg) on 14 March 1957. He appointed a non-partisan prime minister Djuanda Kartawidjaja, while the military was in the hands of his loyal General Nasution. Nasution increasingly shared Sukarno's views on the negative impact of western democracy on Indonesia, and he saw a more significant role for the military in political life.

As a reconciliatory move, Sukarno invited the leaders of the regional councils to Jakarta on 10–14 September 1957, to attend a National Conference (Musjawarah Nasional), which failed to bring a solution to the crisis. On 30 November 1957, an assassination attempt was made on Sukarno by way of a grenade attack while he was visiting a school function in Cikini, Central Jakarta. Six children were killed, but Sukarno did not suffer any serious wounds. The perpetrators were members of the Darul Islam group, under the order of its leader Sekarmadji Maridjan Kartosuwirjo.

By December 1957, Sukarno began to take serious steps to enforce his authority over the country. On that month, he nationalised 246 Dutch companies which had been dominating the Indonesian economy, most notably the Netherlands Trading Society, Royal Dutch Shell subsidiary Bataafsche Petroleum Maatschappij, Escomptobank, and the "big five" Dutch trading corporations (NV Borneo Sumatra Maatschappij / Borsumij, NV Internationale Crediet- en Handelsvereeneging "Rotterdam" / Internatio, NV Jacobson van den Berg & Co, NV Lindeteves-Stokvis, and NV Geo Wehry & Co), and expelled 40,000 Dutch citizens remaining in Indonesia while confiscating their properties, purportedly due to the failure by the Dutch government to continue negotiations on the fate of Netherlands New Guinea as was promised in the 1949 Round Table Conference. Sukarno's policy of economic nationalism was strengthened by the issuance of Presidential Directive No. 10 of 1959, which banned commercial activities by foreign nationals in rural areas. This rule targeted ethnic Chinese, who dominated both the rural and urban retail economy, although at this time few of them had Indonesian citizenship. This policy resulted in massive relocation of the rural ethnic-Chinese population to urban areas, and approximately 100,000 chose to return to China.

To face the dissident regional commanders, Sukarno and Army Chief Nasution decided to take drastic steps following the failure of Musjawarah Nasional. By utilizing regional officers that remained loyal to Jakarta, Nasution organized a series of "regional coups" which ousted the dissident commanders in North Sumatra (Colonel Maludin Simbolon) and South Sumatra (Colonel Barlian) by December 1957. This returned government control over key cities of Medan and Palembang.

In February 1958, the remaining dissident commanders in Central Sumatra (Colonel Ahmad Hussein) and North Sulawesi (Colonel Ventje Sumual) formed the PRRI-Permesta Movement aimed at overthrowing the Jakarta government. They were joined by many civilian politicians from the Masyumi Party, such as Sjafruddin Prawiranegara, who were opposed to the growing influence of communists. Due to their anti-communist rhetoric, the rebels received money, weapons, and manpower from the CIA in a campaign known as Archipelago. This support ended when Allen Lawrence Pope, an American pilot, was shot down after a bombing raid on government-held Ambon in April 1958. In April 1958, the central government responded by launching airborne and seaborne military invasions on Padang and Manado, the rebel capitals. By the end of 1958, the rebels had been militarily defeated, and the last remaining rebel guerrilla bands surrendered in August 1961.

== Guided Democracy period (1959–1966) ==
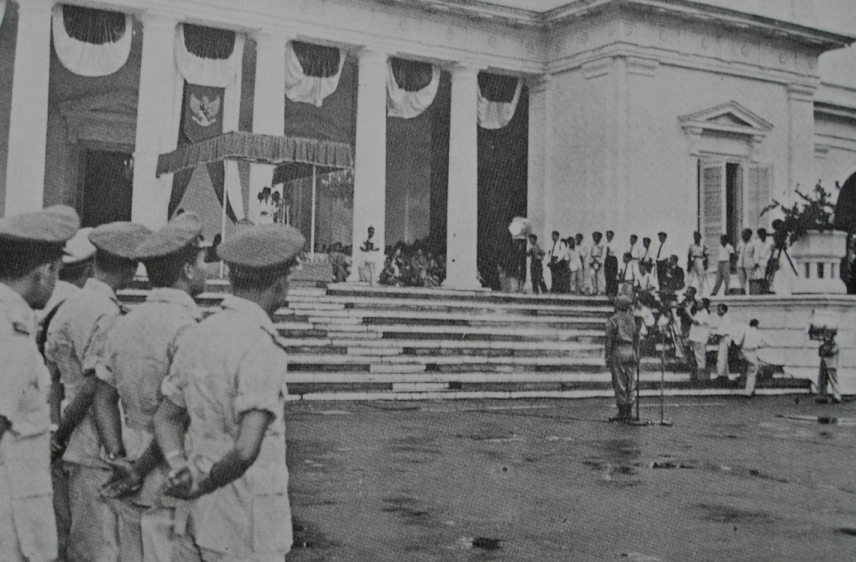
Sukarno (on top of the steps) reading his decree on 5 July 1959

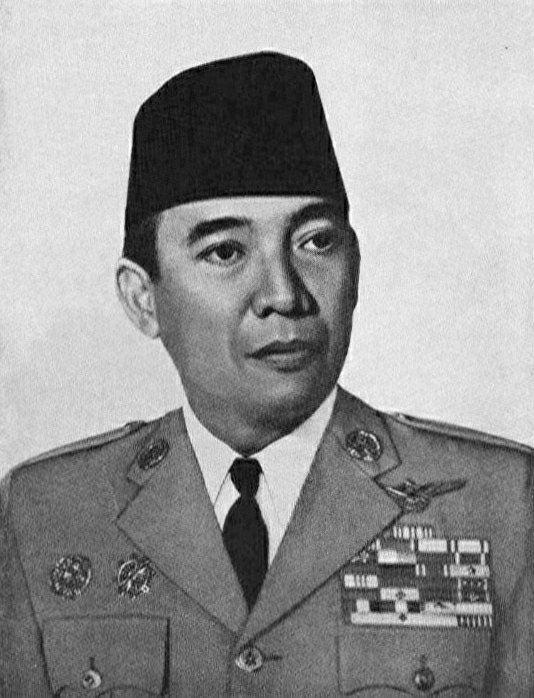
Sukarno's official portrait in the 1960s, complete with military-style decorations

The impressive military victories over the PRRI-Permesta rebels and the popular nationalisation of Dutch companies left Sukarno in a firm position. On 5 July 1959, Sukarno reinstated the 1945 constitution by presidential decree. It established a presidential system which he believed would make it easier to implement the principles of guided democracy. He called the system Manifesto Politik or Manipol, but it was actually government by decree. Sukarno envisioned an Indonesian-style socialist society, adherent to the principle of USDEK:

1. Undang-Undang Dasar '45 (Constitution of 1945)
2. Sosialisme Indonesia (Indonesian Socialism)
3. Demokrasi Terpimpin (Guided Democracy)
4. Ekonomi Terpimpin (Commanded Economy).
5. Kepribadian Indonesia (Indonesia's Identity)

The structure of Sukarno's guided democracy in 1962

After establishing guided democracy, Sukarno along with Maladi met Devi Dja, an Indonesian-born dancer who changed her citizenship to the United States, in mid-1959, and convinced her to return as an Indonesian citizen, which Dja refused. In March 1960, Sukarno disbanded parliament and replaced it with a new parliament where half the members were appointed by the president (Dewan Perwakilan Rakjat - Gotong Rojong / DPR-GR). In September 1960, he established a Provisional People's Consultative Assembly (Madjelis Permusjawaratan Rakjat Sementara/MPRS) as the highest legislative authority according to the 1945 constitution. MPRS members consisted of members of DPR-GR and members of "functional groups" appointed by the president.

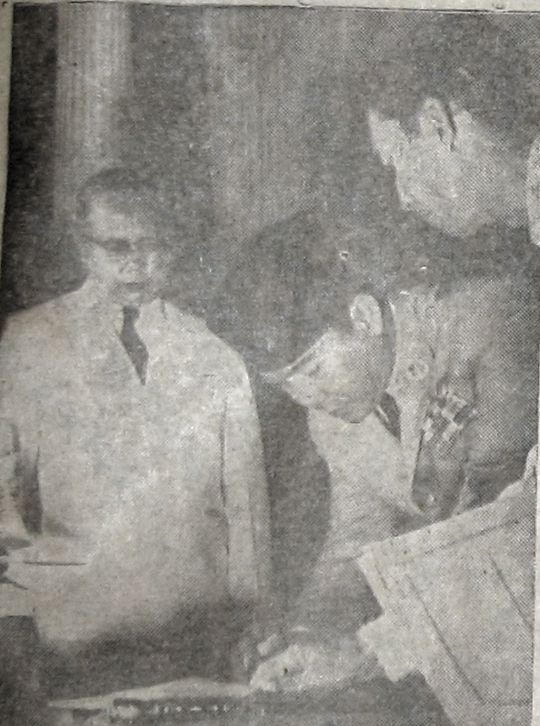
President Sukarno signing a letter to transfer power from Djuanda to himself

With the backing of the military, Sukarno disbanded the Islamic party Masyumi and Sutan Sjahrir's party PSI, accusing them of involvement with PRRI-Permesta affair. The military arrested and imprisoned many of Sukarno's political opponents, from socialist Sjahrir to Islamic politicians Mohammad Natsir and Hamka. Using martial law powers, the government closed down newspapers that were critical of Sukarno's policies.

During this period, there were several assassination attempts on Sukarno's life. On 9 March 1960, Daniel Maukar, an Indonesian airforce lieutenant who sympathised with the Permesta rebellion, strafed the Merdeka Palace and Bogor Palace with his MiG-17 fighter jet, attempting to kill the president; he was not injured. In May 1962, Darul Islam agents shot at the president during Eid al-Adha prayers on the grounds of the palace. Sukarno again escaped injury.

On the security front, the military started a series of effective campaigns which ended the long-festering Darul Islam rebellion in West Java (1962), Aceh (1962), and South Sulawesi (1965). Kartosuwirjo, the leader of Darul Islam, was captured and executed in September 1962.

To counterbalance the power of the military, Sukarno started to rely on the support of the PKI. In 1960, he declared his government to be based on Nasakom, a union of the three ideological strands present in Indonesian society: nasionalisme (nationalism), agama (religions), and komunisme (communism). Accordingly, Sukarno started admitting more communists into his government, while developing a strong relationship with the PKI chairman Dipa Nusantara Aidit.

In order to increase Indonesia's prestige, Sukarno supported and won the bid for the 1962 Asian Games held in Jakarta. Many sporting facilities such as the Senayan sports complex (including the 100,000-seat Bung Karno Stadium) were built to accommodate the games. There was political tension when the Indonesians refused the entry of delegations from Israel and Taiwan. After the International Olympic Committee imposed sanctions on Indonesia due to this exclusion policy, Sukarno retaliated by organizing a "non-imperialist" competitor event to the Olympic Games, called the Games of New Emerging Forces (GANEFO). GANEFO was successfully held in Jakarta in November 1963 and was attended by 2,700 athletes from 51 countries.

As part of his prestige-building program, Sukarno ordered the construction of large monumental buildings such as National Monument (Monumen Nasional), Istiqlal Mosque, Jakarta, CONEFO Building (now the Parliament Building), Hotel Indonesia, and the Sarinah shopping centre to transform Jakarta from a former colonial backwater to a modern city. The modern Jakarta boulevards of Jalan Thamrin, Jalan Sudirman, and Jalan Gatot Subroto were planned and constructed under Sukarno.

=== Foreign policy ===
==== Bandung Conference ====
On the international front, Sukarno organized the Bandung Conference in 1955, with the goal of uniting the developing Asian and African countries into the Non-Aligned Movement to counter both the United States and the Soviet Union.

==== Cold War ====
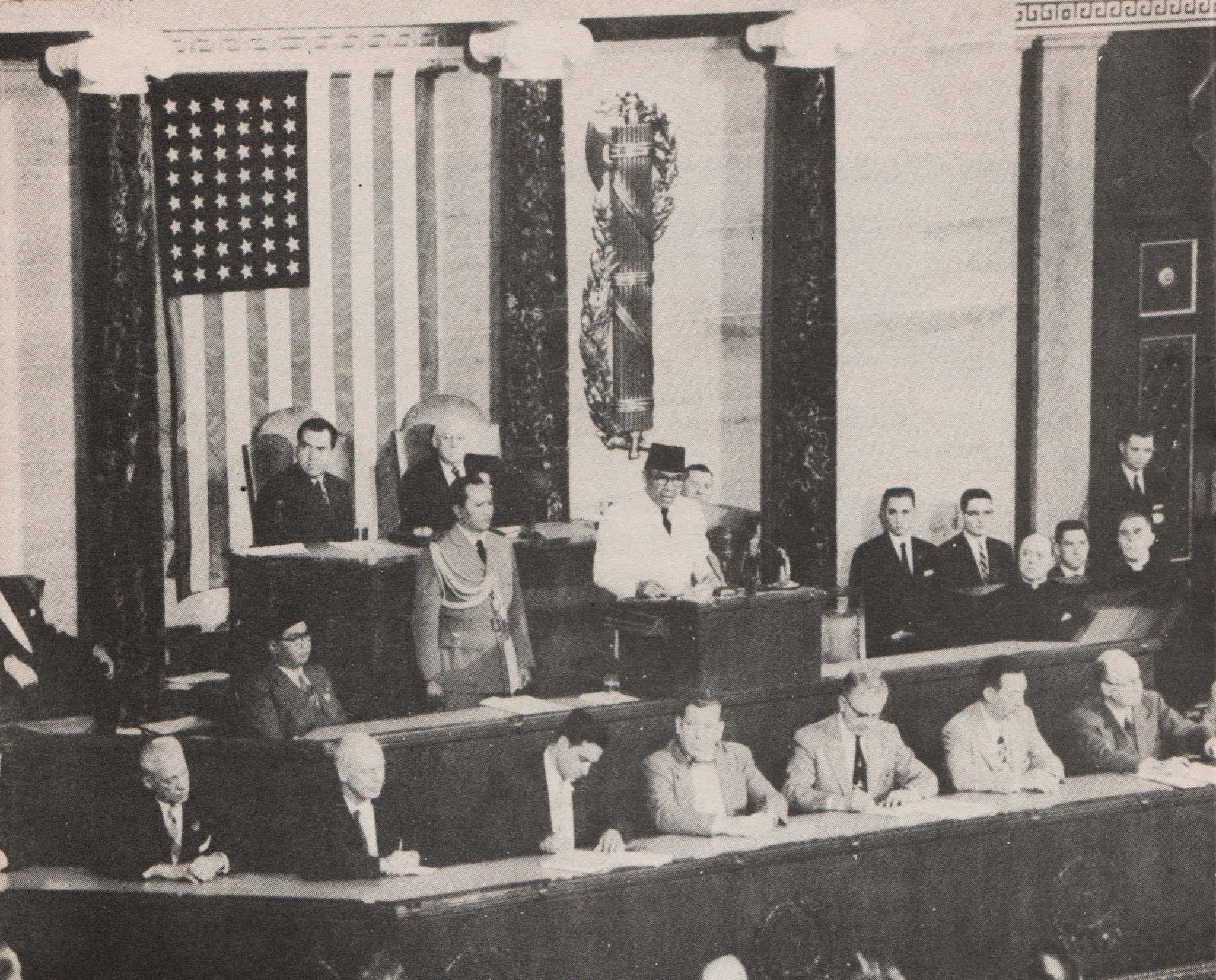
Sukarno addressing the US Congress in 1956. Sitting behind him were Vice President and President of the Senate Richard Nixon and Speaker of the House Sam Rayburn.

As Sukarno's domestic authority was secured, he began to pay more attention to the world stage. He embarked on a series of aggressive and assertive policies based on anti-imperialism to increase Indonesia's international prestige. These anti-imperialist and anti-Western policies, often employing brinkmanship with other nations, were also designed to unite the diverse and fractious Indonesian people. In this, he was aided by his foreign minister Subandrio.

After his first visit to Beijing in 1956, Sukarno began to strengthen his ties to the People's Republic of China and the communist bloc in general. He also began to accept increasing amounts of Soviet-bloc military aid. By the early 1960s, the Soviet bloc provided more aid to Indonesia than to any other non-communist country, while Soviet military aid to Indonesia was equalled only by its aid to Cuba. This substantial influx of communist aid prompted an increase in military aid from the Dwight D. Eisenhower and John F. Kennedy administrations, which worried about a leftward drift should Sukarno rely too much on Soviet-bloc aid.

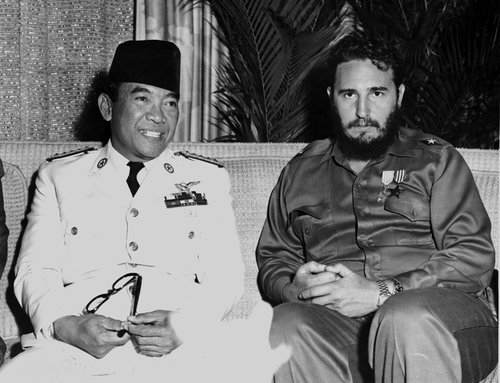
Sukarno and Fidel Castro in Havana, Cuba, 1960

Sukarno was feted during his visit to the United States in 1956, where he addressed a joint session of the United States Congress. As of 2025, it was the only time any Indonesian president has addressed a joint session of the US Congress. Soon after his first visit to America, Sukarno visited the Soviet Union, where he received an even more lavish welcome. Soviet premier Nikita Khrushchev paid a return visit to Jakarta and Bali in 1960, where he awarded Sukarno with the Lenin Peace Prize. To make amends for CIA involvement in the PRRI-Permesta rebellion, Kennedy invited Sukarno to Washington, D.C., and provided Indonesia with billions of dollars in civilian and military aid.

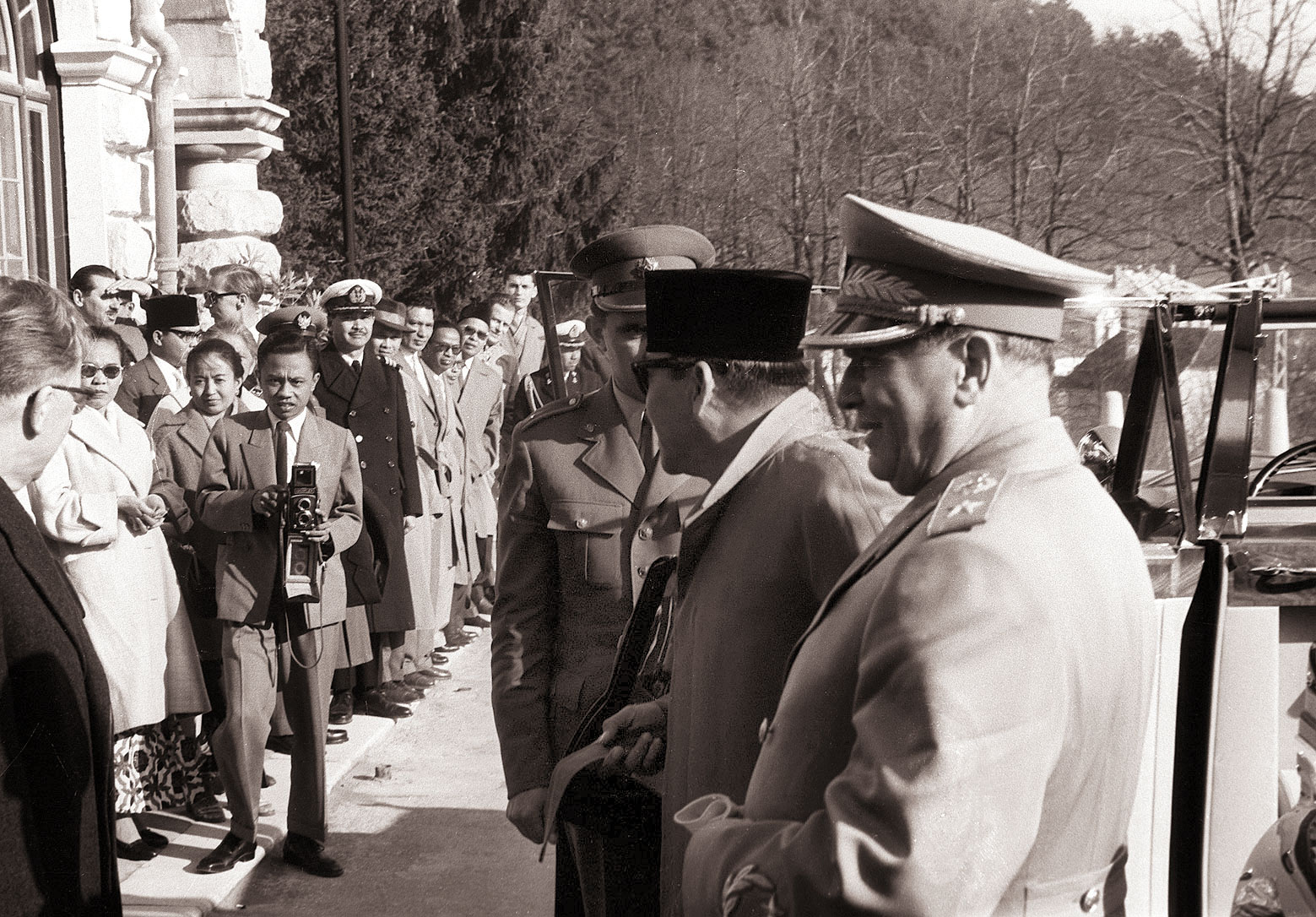
President Tito and Sukarno at the exit of Postojna Cave, 6 April 1960

To follow up on the successful 1955 Bandung Conference, Sukarno attempted to forge a new alliance called the "New Emerging Forces" (NEFO), as a counter to the Western superpowers dubbed the "Old Established Forces" (OLDEFO), whom he accused of spreading "Neo-Colonialism and Imperialism" (NEKOLIM). In 1961, Sukarno established another political alliance, called the Non-Aligned Movement (NAM, in Indonesia known as Gerakan Non-Blok, GNB) at the 1st Summit of the Non-Aligned Movement in Belgrade together with Egypt's President Gamal Abdel Nasser, India's Prime Minister Pandit Jawaharlal Nehru, Yugoslavia's President Josip Broz Tito, and Ghana's President Kwame Nkrumah, in an action called The Initiative of Five (Sukarno, Nkrumah, Nasser, Tito, and Nehru). NAM was intended to provide political unity and influence for nations who wished to maintain independence from the American and Soviet superpower blocs, which were engaged in Cold War competition. Sukarno is still fondly remembered for his role in promoting the influence of newly independent countries. His name is used as a street name in Cairo, Egypt and Rabat, Morocco, and as a major square in Peshawar, Pakistan. In 1956, the University of Belgrade awarded him an honorary doctorate.

During the Cold War, Sukarno’s neutral stance got him in trouble with both the Soviet KGB and American CIA, who tried blackmailing him with sex tapes. Around 1960, during Moscow visits, the KGB allegedly filmed him with women, maybe flight attendants, to push his policies their way. Sukarno laughed it off and even asked for copies of the tapes. In an effort to damage his reputation, the CIA produced a fake pornographic film featuring a Sukarno look-alike and Russian women, which they claimed had been created by the KGB. Both plans flopped; Indonesians saw Sukarno as a tough guy, and he kept his non-aligned path till his 1967 ouster.

==== Papua conflict ====
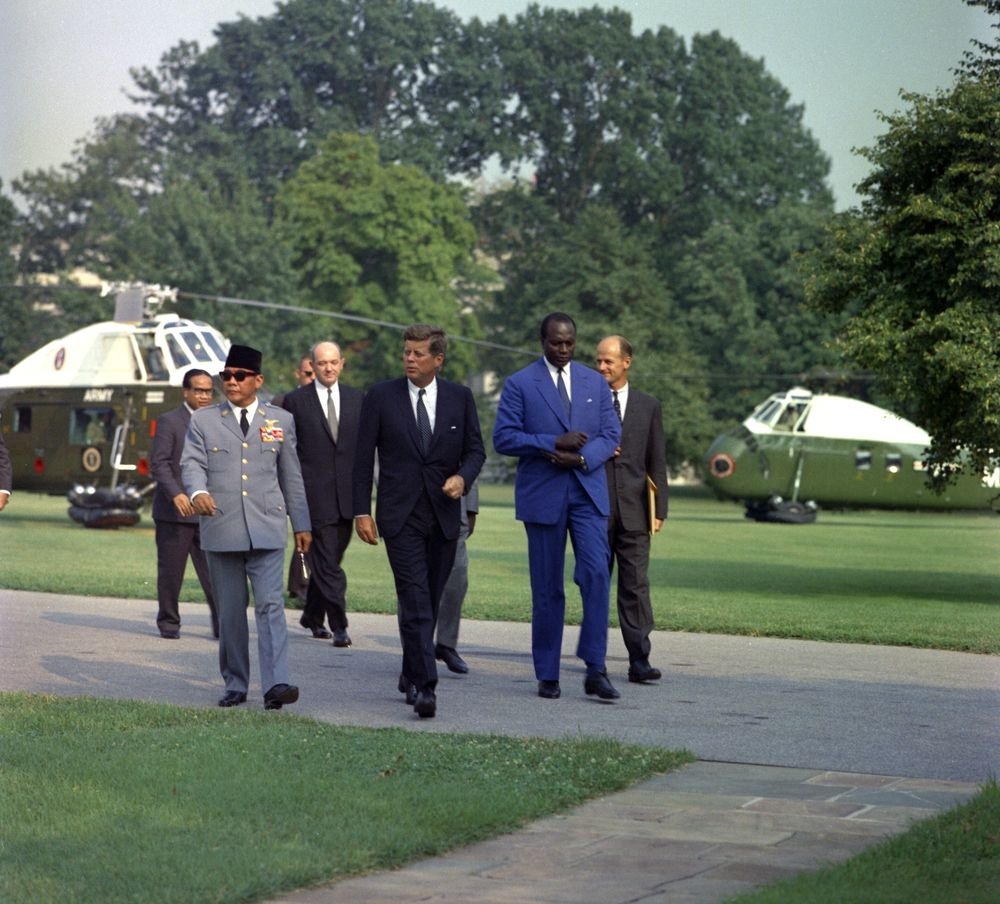
Sukarno meeting with US President John F. Kennedy, 1961

In 1960 Sukarno began an aggressive foreign policy to secure Indonesian territorial claims. In August of that year, he broke off diplomatic relations with the Netherlands over the continuing failure to commence talks on the future of Netherlands New Guinea, as was agreed at the Dutch-Indonesian Round Table Conference of 1949. In April 1961, the Dutch announced the formation of a Nieuw Guinea Raad, intending to create an independent Papuan state. Sukarno declared a state of military confrontation in his Tri Komando Rakjat (TRIKORA) speech in Yogyakarta, on 19 December 1961. He then directed military incursions into the half-island, which he referred to as West Irian. By the end of 1962, 3,000 Indonesian soldiers were present throughout West Irian/West Papua.

On 28 August 1961, Elizabeth II invited Sukarno for a state visit to London which was scheduled in May 1962. But on 19 September, Juliana of the Netherlands, who heard the news, felt unhappy due to the breakdown of Indonesia's diplomatic relations with the Netherlands after the West Irian dispute. Upon hearing the news, she stated that negotiations with Indonesia regarding West Irian would not take place and did not allow Elizabeth, who was still her distant niece, to invite Sukarno, which resulted in a worsening of Indonesia's diplomatic relations with the United Kingdom. On 21 April 1962, Sukarno canceled the visit due to a Dutch attack on the Indonesian Navy fleet in the Arafuru Sea.

A naval battle erupted in January 1962 when four Indonesian torpedo boats were intercepted by Dutch ships and planes off the coast of Vlakke Hoek. One Indonesian boat was sunk, killing the Naval Deputy Chief-of-Staff Commodore Jos Sudarso. Meanwhile, the Kennedy Administration worried of a continuing Indonesian shift towards communism should the Dutch hold on to West Irian/West Papua. In February 1962 U.S. Attorney General Robert F. Kennedy travelled to the Netherlands and informed the government that the United States would not support the Netherlands in an armed conflict with Indonesia. With Soviet armaments and advisors, Sukarno planned a large-scale air- and sea-borne invasion of the Dutch military headquarters of Biak for August 1962, called Operasi Djajawidjaja. It was to be led by Major-General Suharto. Before these plans could be realised, Indonesia and the Netherlands signed the New York Agreement in August 1962. The two countries agreed to implement the Bunker Plan (formulated by American diplomat Ellsworth Bunker), whereby the Dutch agreed to hand over West Irian/West Papua to UNTEA on 1 October 1962. UNTEA transferred the territory to Indonesian authority in May 1963.

==== Konfrontasi ====
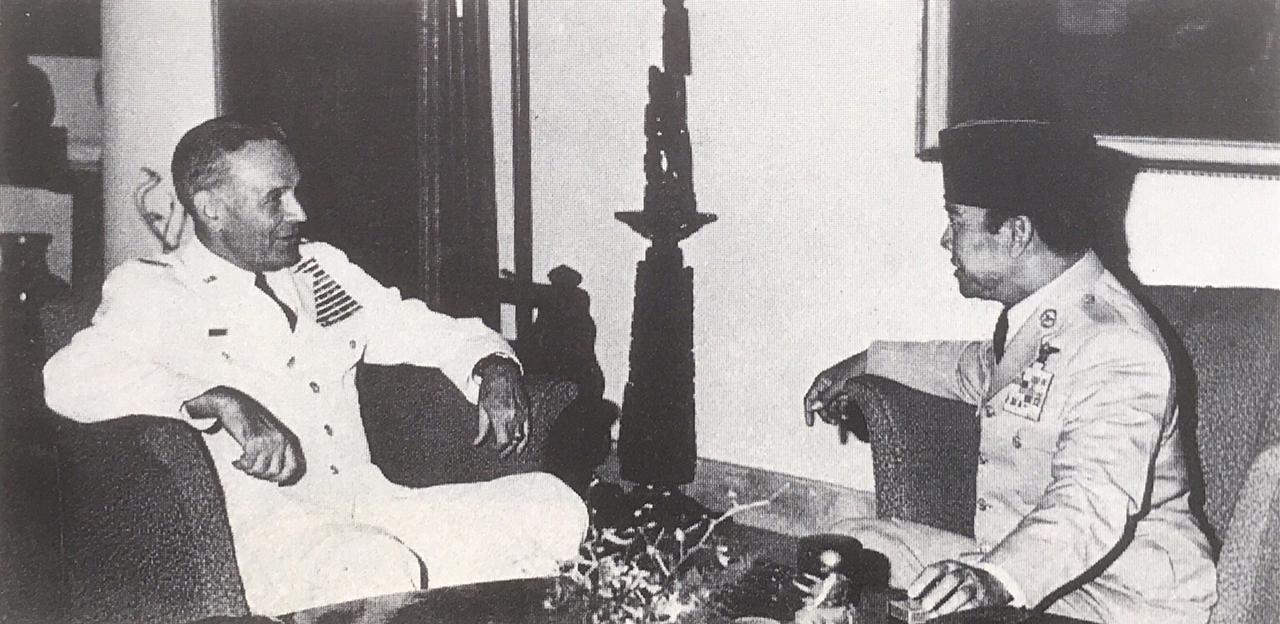
Sukarno with Chairman of the Joint Chiefs of Staff General Maxwell Taylor at the Merdeka Palace on 2 August 1963

After securing control over West Irian/West Papua, Sukarno then opposed the British-supported establishment of the Federation of Malaysia in 1963, claiming that it was a neo-colonial plot by the British to undermine Indonesia. Despite Sukarno's political overtures, which found some support when leftist political elements in British Borneo territories Sarawak and Brunei opposed the Federation plan and aligned themselves with Sukarno, Malaysia was established in September 1963. This was followed by the Indonesia–Malaysia confrontation (Konfrontasi), proclaimed by Sukarno in his Dwi Komando Rakjat (DWIKORA) speech in Jakarta on 3 May 1964. Sukarno's proclaimed objective was not, as some alleged, to annex Sabah and Sarawak into Indonesia, but to establish a "State of North Kalimantan" under the control of the North Kalimantan Communist Party. From 1964 until early 1966, a limited number of Indonesian soldiers, civilians, and Malaysian communist guerrillas were sent into North Borneo and the Malay Peninsula. These forces fought against British and Commonwealth soldiers deployed to protect the nascent state of Malaysia. Indonesian agents also exploded several bombs in Singapore. Domestically, Sukarno fomented anti-British sentiment, and the British Embassy was burned down. In 1964, all British companies operating in the country, including Indonesian operations of the Chartered Bank and Unilever, were nationalised. The confrontation came to a climax during August 1964, when Sukarno authorised landings of Indonesian troops at Pontian and Labis on the Malaysian mainland, and all-out war seemed inevitable as tensions escalated. However, the situation calmed by mid-September at the culmination of the Sunda Straits Crisis, and after the disastrous Battle of Plaman Mapu in April 1965, Indonesian raids into Sarawak became fewer and weaker.

In 1964, Sukarno commenced an anti-American campaign, which was motivated by his shift towards the communist bloc and less friendly relations with the Lyndon Johnson administration. Sukarno declare 1964 the "year of living dangerously," signalling his desire to reshape the global order. American interests and businesses in Indonesia were denounced by government officials and attacked by PKI-led mobs. American movies were banned, American books and Beatles albums were burned, and the Indonesian band Koes Plus was jailed for playing American-style rock and roll music. As a result, USA aid to Indonesia was halted, to which Sukarno made his famous remark "Go to hell with your aid". Sukarno withdrew Indonesia from the United Nations on 7 January 1965 when, with U.S. backing, Malaysia took a seat on the UN Security Council.

==== Conference of the New Emerging Forces ====
As the NAM countries were splitting into different factions, and as fewer countries were willing to support his anti-Western foreign policies, Sukarno began to abandon his non-alignment rhetoric. Sukarno formed a new alliance with China, North Korea, North Vietnam, and Cambodia which he called the "Beijing-Pyongyang-Hanoi-Phnom Penh-Jakarta Axis". After withdrawing Indonesia from the "imperialist-dominated" United Nations in January 1965, Sukarno sought to establish a competitor organisation to the UN called the Conference of the New Emerging Forces (CONEFO) with support from the People's Republic of China, which at that time was not yet a member of United Nations. With the government heavily indebted to the Soviet Union, Indonesia became increasingly dependent on China for support. Sukarno spoke increasingly of a Beijing-Jakarta axis, which would be the core of a new anti-imperialist world organization, the CONEFO. Scholars have posited that Western fears of CONEFO as an alternative United Nations remain an overlooked factor in the U.S. support for Suharto's coup.

=== Domestic policy ===
==== President for life and personality cult ====
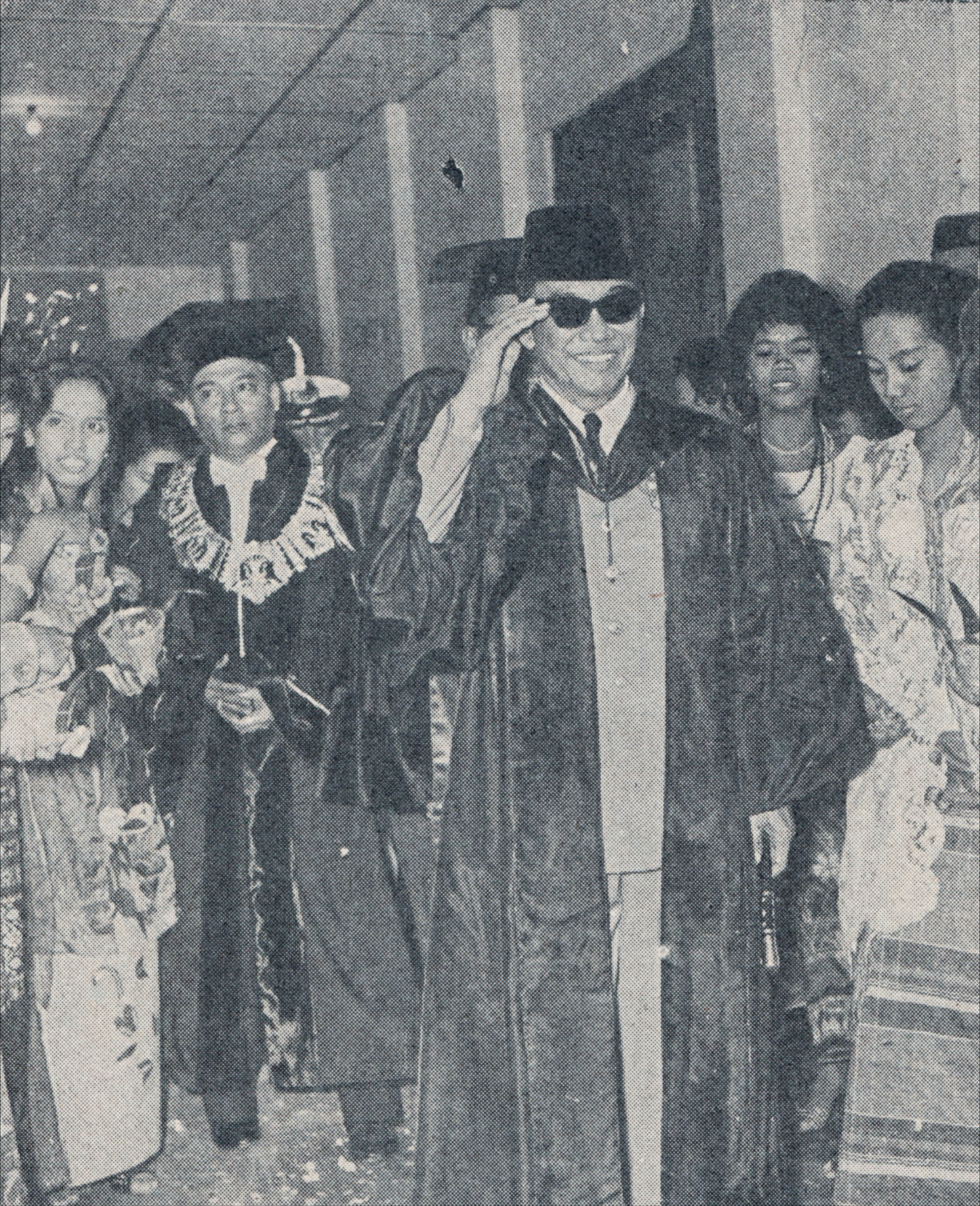
Sukarno receiving an honorary doctorate from the University of Indonesia, 2 February 1963

Domestically, Sukarno continued to consolidate his control. On 18 May 1963, the MPRS elected Sukarno president for life. His ideological writings on Manipol-USDEK and Nasakom became mandatory subjects in schools and universities, while his speeches were to be memorised and discussed by all students. All newspapers, the only radio station (RRI, government-run), and the only television station (TVRI, also government-run) were made into "tools of the revolution" and functioned to spread Sukarno's messages. Sukarno developed a personality cult, with the capital of newly acquired West Irian renamed to Sukarnapura and the highest peak in the country was renamed from Carstensz Pyramid to Puntjak Sukarno (Sukarno Peak).

==== Rise of the PKI ====
Despite these appearances of unchallenged control, Sukarno's guided democracy stood on fragile grounds due to the inherent conflict between its two underlying support pillars, the military and the communists. The military, nationalists, and the Islamic groups were shocked by the rapid growth of the communist party under Sukarno's protection. They feared an imminent establishment of a communist state in Indonesia. By 1965, the PKI had three million members and were particularly strong in Central Java and Bali. The PKI had become the strongest party in Indonesia.

The military and nationalists were growing wary of Sukarno's close alliance with communist China, which they thought compromised Indonesia's sovereignty. Elements of the military disagreed with Sukarno's policy of confrontation with Malaysia, which in their view only benefited communists, and sent several officers (including future armed forces Chief Leonardus Benjamin Moerdani) to spread secret peace-feelers to the Malaysian government. The Islamic clerics, who were mostly landowners, felt threatened by PKI's land confiscation actions (aksi sepihak) in the countryside and by the communist campaign against the "seven village devils", a term used for landlords or better-off farmers (similar to the anti-kulak campaign in Stalinist era). Both groups harboured deep disdain for PKI in particular due to memories of the bloody 1948 communist rebellion.

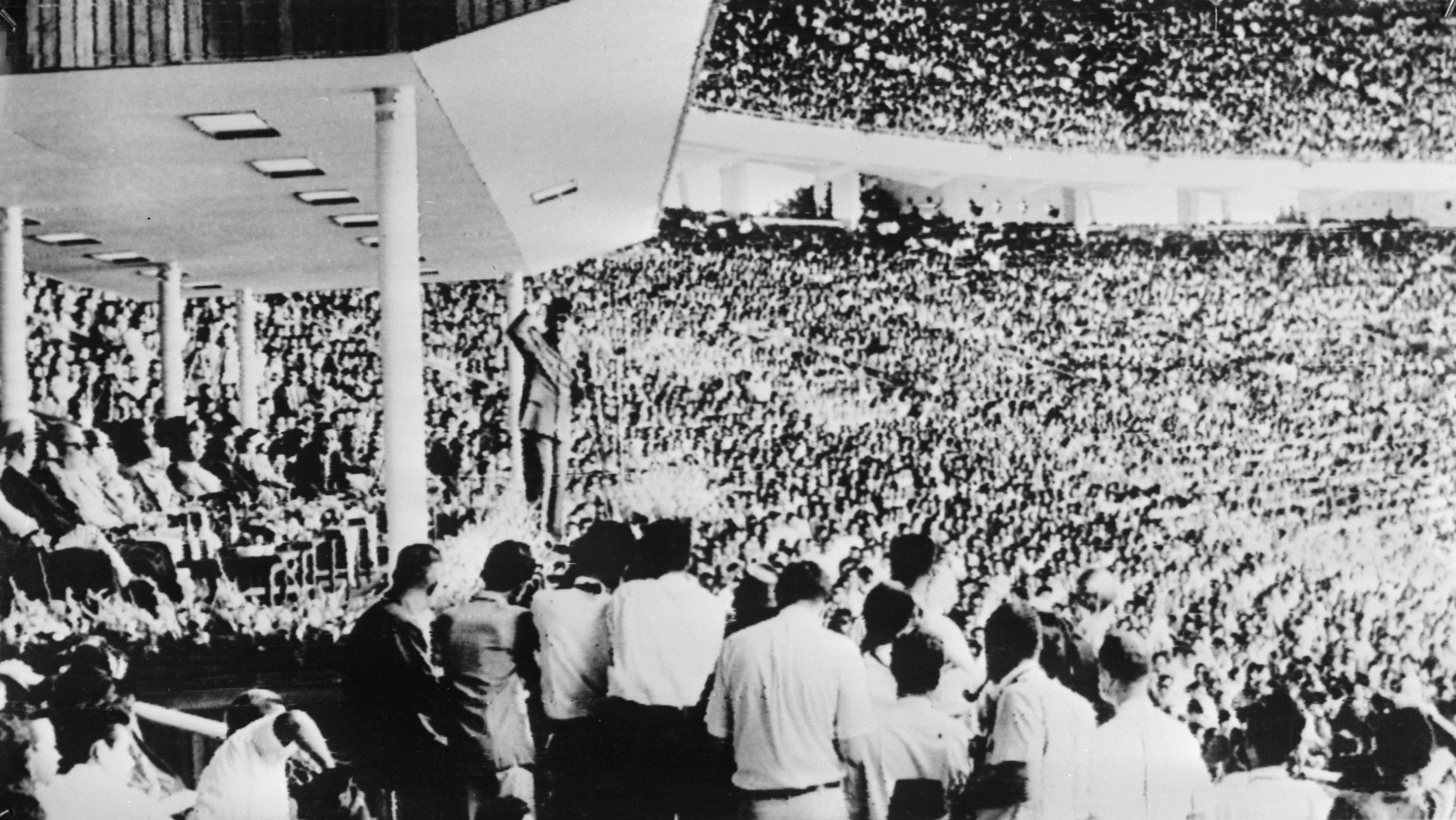
Sukarno speaks at the celebration of the 45th anniversary of the PKI at the Gelora Bung Karno Main Stadium (GBK), April 1965.

As the mediator of the three groups under the NASAKOM system, Sukarno displayed greater sympathies to the communists. The PKI had been very careful to support all of Sukarno's policies. Meanwhile, Sukarno saw the PKI as the best-organized and ideologically solid party in Indonesia, and a useful conduit to gain more military and financial aid from Communist Bloc countries. Sukarno also sympathised with the communists' revolutionary ideals, which were similar to his own.

To weaken the influence of the military, Sukarno rescinded martial law (which gave wide-ranging powers to the military) in 1963. In September 1962, he "promoted" the powerful General Nasution to the less-influential position of armed forces chief, while the influential position of army chief was given to Sukarno's loyalist Ahmad Yani. Meanwhile, the position of air force chief was given to Omar Dhani, who was an open communist sympathiser. In May 1964, Sukarno banned the activities of Manifesto Kebudajaan (Manikebu), an association of artists and writers which included prominent Indonesian writers such as Hans Bague Jassin and Wiratmo Soekito, who were also dismissed from their jobs. Manikebu was considered a rival by the communist writer's association Lembaga Kebudajaan Rakjat (Lekra), led by Pramoedya Ananta Toer. In December 1964, Sukarno disbanded the Badan Pendukung Soekarnoisme (BPS, "Association for Promoting Sukarnoism"), an organization that sought to oppose communism by invoking Sukarno's own Pancasila formulation. In January 1965, Sukarno, under pressure from the PKI, banned the Murba Party. Murba was a pro-Soviet Union party whose ideology was antagonistic to the PKI's pro-Chinese People's Republic view of Marxism.

1966 ABC report discussing Sukarno's political context for Konfrontasi

Tensions between the military and communists increased in April 1965, when PKI chairman Aidit called for the formation of a "fifth armed force" consisting of armed peasants and labourers. Sukarno approved this idea and publicly called for the immediate formation of such a force on 17 May 1965. However, Army Chief Ahmad Yani and Defense Minister Nasution procrastinated in implementing this idea, as this was tantamount to allowing the PKI to establish its own armed forces. Soon afterwards, on 29 May, the "Gilchrist Letter" appeared. The letter was supposedly written by the British ambassador Andrew Gilchrist to the Foreign Office in London, mentioning a joint American and British attempt on subversion in Indonesia with the help of "local army friends." This letter, produced by Subandrio, aroused Sukarno's fear of a military plot to overthrow him, a fear which he repeatedly mentioned during the next few months. The Czechoslovak agent Ladislav Bittman, who defected in 1968, claimed that his agency (StB) forged the letter on request from PKI via the Soviet Union to smear anti-communist generals. On his independence day speech of 17 August 1965, Sukarno declared his intention to commit Indonesia to an anti-imperialist alliance with China and other communist regimes and warned the army not to interfere. He also stated his support for the establishment of a "fifth force" of armed peasants and labourers.

=== Economic decline ===
While Sukarno devoted his energy to domestic and international politics, the economy of Indonesia was neglected and deteriorated rapidly. The government printed money to finance its military expenditures, resulting in hyperinflation exceeding 600% per annum in 1964–1965. Smuggling and the collapse of export plantation sectors deprived the government of much-needed foreign exchange income. Consequently, the government was unable to service massive foreign debts it had accumulated from both Western and Communist bloc countries. Most of the government budget was spent on the military, resulting in deterioration of infrastructures such as roads, railways, ports, and other public facilities. Deteriorating transportation infrastructure and poor harvests caused food shortages in many places. The small industrial sector languished and only produced at 20% capacity due to lack of investment.

Sukarno himself was contemptuous of macroeconomics and was unable and unwilling to provide practical solutions to the poor economic condition of the country. Instead, he produced more ideological conceptions such as Trisakti: political sovereignty, economic self-sufficiency, and cultural independence. He advocated Indonesians "standing on their own feet" (Berdikari) and achieving economic self-sufficiency, free from foreign influence.

Towards the end of his rule, Sukarno's lack of interest in economics created a distance between himself and the Indonesian people, who were suffering economically.

== Removal from power and death ==
=== 30 September Movement ===
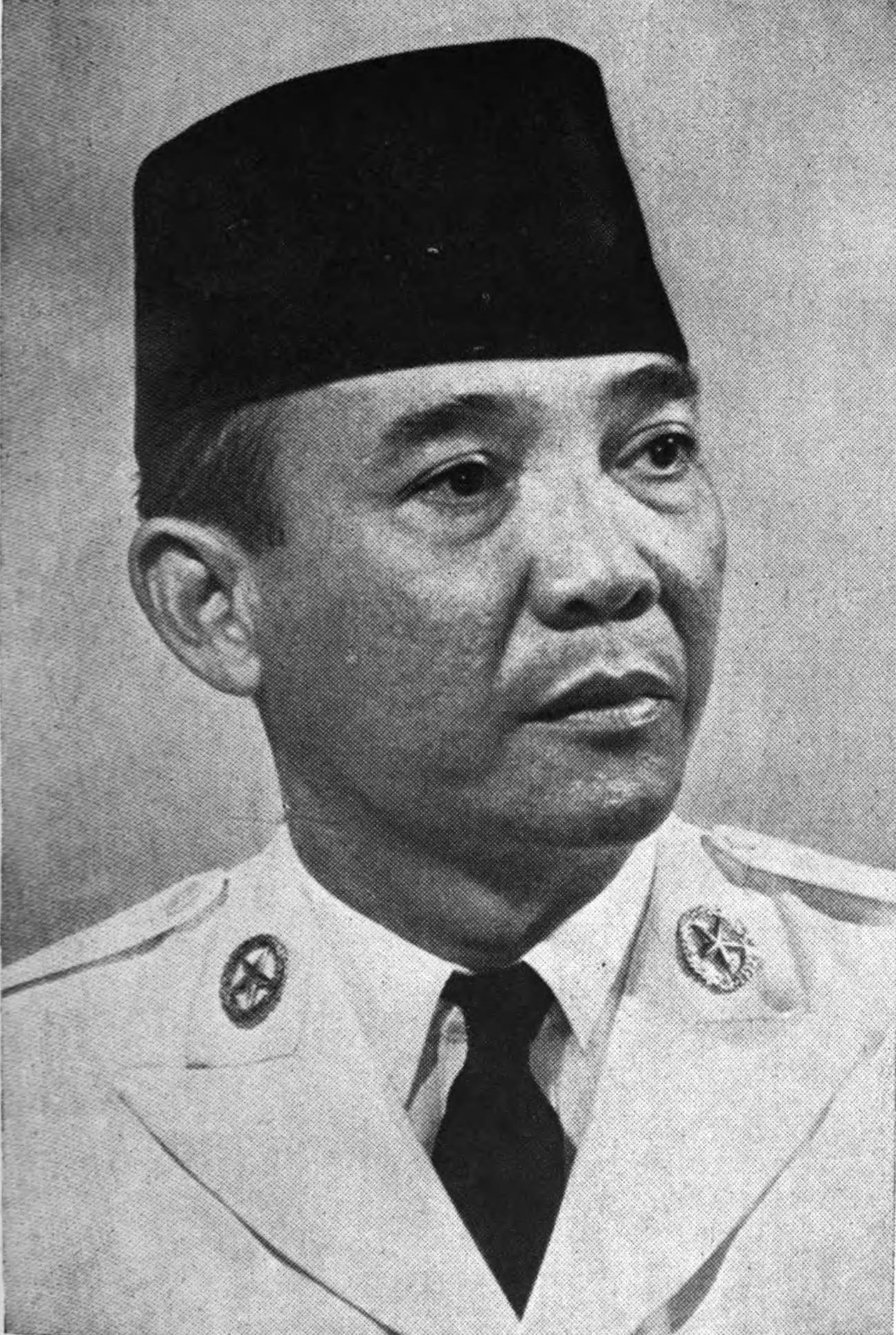
Official portrait

==== Kidnappings and murders ====
On the dawn of 1 October 1965, six of Indonesia's most senior army generals were kidnapped and murdered by a movement calling themselves the "30 September Movement" (G30S). Among those killed was Yani, while Nasution narrowly escaped, but the movement kidnapped First Lieutenant Pierre Tendean, his adjutant, presumably mistaking him for Nasution in the darkness. The G30S consisted of members of the Presidential Guards, Brawidjaja Division, and Diponegoro Division, under the command of a Lieutenant-Colonel Untung bin Sjamsuri. The movement took control of the RRI radio station and Merdeka Square. They broadcast a statement declaring the kidnappings were meant to protect Sukarno from a coup attempt by CIA-influenced generals. Later, it broadcast news of the disbandment of Sukarno's cabinet, to be replaced by a "Revolutionary Council." In Central Java, soldiers associated with the G30S also seized control of Yogyakarta and Solo on 1–2 October, killing two colonels in the process.

==== The end of the movement ====
Major General Suharto, commander of the military's strategic reserve command, took control of the army the following morning. Suharto ordered troops to take over the RRI radio station and Merdeka Square itself. On the afternoon of that day, Suharto issued an ultimatum to the Halim Air Force Base, where the G30S had based themselves and where Sukarno (the reasons for his presence are unclear and were subject of claim and counter-claim), Air Marshal Omar Dhani, and PKI Chairman Aidit had gathered. By the following day, it was clear that the incompetently organized and poorly coordinated coup had failed. Sukarno took up residence in the Bogor Palace, while Dhani fled to East Java and Aidit to Central Java. By 2 October, Suharto's soldiers occupied Halim Air Force Base, after a short gunfight. Sukarno's obedience to Suharto's 1 October ultimatum to leave Halim is seen as changing all power relationships. Sukarno's fragile balance of power between the military, political Islam, communists and nationalists that underlay his "Guided Democracy" was now collapsing. On 3 October, the corpses of the kidnapped generals were discovered near the Halim Air Force Base, and on 5 October they were buried in a public ceremony led by Suharto.

==== Aftermath of the movement ====
In early October 1965, a military propaganda campaign began to sweep the country, successfully convincing both Indonesian and international audiences that it was a communist coup, and that the murders were cowardly atrocities against Indonesian heroes since those who were shot were veteran military officers. PKI's denials of involvement had little effect. Following the discovery and public burial of the generals' corpses on 5 October, the army along with Islamic organizations Muhammadiyah and Nahdlatul Ulama led a campaign to purge Indonesian society, government and armed forces of the communist party and other leftist organizations. Leading PKI members were immediately arrested, some summarily executed. Aidit was captured and killed in November 1965. The purge spread across the country with the worst massacres in Java and Bali. In some areas, the army organized civilian groups and local militias, in other areas communal vigilante action preceded the army. The most widely accepted estimates are that at least half a million were killed. It is thought that as many as 1.5 million were imprisoned at one stage or another.

As a result of the purge, one of Sukarno's three pillars of support, the PKI, had been effectively eliminated by the other two, the military and political Islam. The killings and the failure of his tenuous "revolution" distressed Sukarno, and he tried unsuccessfully to protect the PKI by referring to the generals' killings as een rimpeltje in de oceaan ("ripple in the sea of the revolution"). He tried to maintain his influence by appealing in a January 1966 broadcast for the country to follow him. Subandrio sought to create a Sukarnoist column (Barisan Sukarno), which was undermined by Suharto's pledge of loyalty to Sukarno and the concurrent instruction for all those loyal to Sukarno to announce their support for the army.

=== Transition to the New Order ===
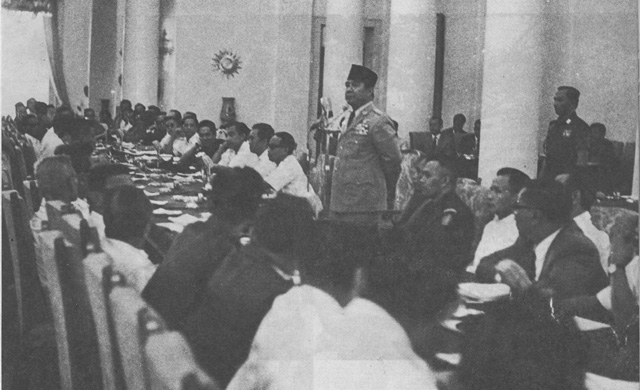
President Sukarno leading the session of the Dwikora Cabinet while university students demonstrated outside

==== Cabinet reshuffle ====
On 1 October 1965, Sukarno appointed General Pranoto Reksosamudro as army chief to replace the deceased Yani, but he was forced to give this position to Suharto two weeks later. In February 1966, Sukarno reshuffled his cabinet, sacking Nasution as defense minister and abolishing his position of armed forces chief of staff, but Nasution refused to step down. Beginning in January 1966, university students started demonstrating against Sukarno, demanding the disbandment of PKI and for the government to control spiralling inflation. In February 1966, student demonstrators in front of Merdeka Palace were shot at by Presidential Guards, killing the student Arief Rachman Hakim, who was quickly turned into a martyr by student demonstrators.

==== Supersemar ====
A meeting of Sukarno's full cabinet was held at the Merdeka Palace on 11 March 1966. As students were demonstrating against the administration, unidentified troops began to assemble outside. Sukarno, Subandrio and another minister immediately left the meeting and went to the Bogor Palace by helicopter. Three pro-Suharto generals (Basuki Rahmat, Amir Machmud, and Mohammad Jusuf) were dispatched to the Bogor Palace, and they met with Sukarno, who signed for them a Presidential Order known as Supersemar. Through the order, Sukarno assigned Suharto to "take all measures considered necessary to guarantee security, calm and stability of the government and the revolution and to guarantee the personal safety and authority [of Sukarno]". The authorship of the document, and whether Sukarno was forced to sign, perhaps even at gunpoint, is a point of historical debate. The effect of the order, however, was the transfer of most presidential authority to Suharto. After obtaining the Presidential Order, Suharto had the PKI declared illegal, and the party was abolished. He also arrested many high-ranking officials that were loyal to Sukarno on the charge of being PKI members and/or sympathizers, further reducing Sukarno's political power and influence.

=== House arrest and death ===
April 1967 ABC report of the political tensions at end of the Sukarno era

On 22 June 1966, Sukarno made his Nawaksara speech in front of the MPRS, now purged of communist and pro-Sukarno elements, in an unsuccessful last-ditch attempt to defend himself and his guided democracy system. In August 1966, over Sukarno's objections, Indonesia ended its confrontation with Malaysia and rejoined the United Nations. Following another unsuccessful accountability speech (Nawaksara Addendum) on 10 January 1967, Sukarno relinquished his executive powers to Suharto on 20 February 1967 while remaining nominally as titular president. He was finally stripped of his president for life title by the MPRS on 12 March 1967 in a session chaired by his former ally, Nasution. On the same day, the MPR named Suharto acting president. Sukarno was put under house arrest in Wisma Yaso (now the Satriamandala Museum), where his health deteriorated due to denial of adequate medical care. He died of kidney failure in Jakarta Army Hospital on 21 June 1970, 15 days after his 69th birthday. He was buried in Blitar, East Java.

== Political rehabilitation ==
On 9 September 2024, the MPR officially revoked MPR Resolution No. XXXIII/MPRS/1967 that was used as an instrument to revoke Sukarno from presidency and barred him from politics. Since there was no trial to prove that Sukarno is responsible for 30 September incident, the MPR revoked the resolution and resolved to restore his reputation posthumously.

== Personal life ==
=== Marriages ===
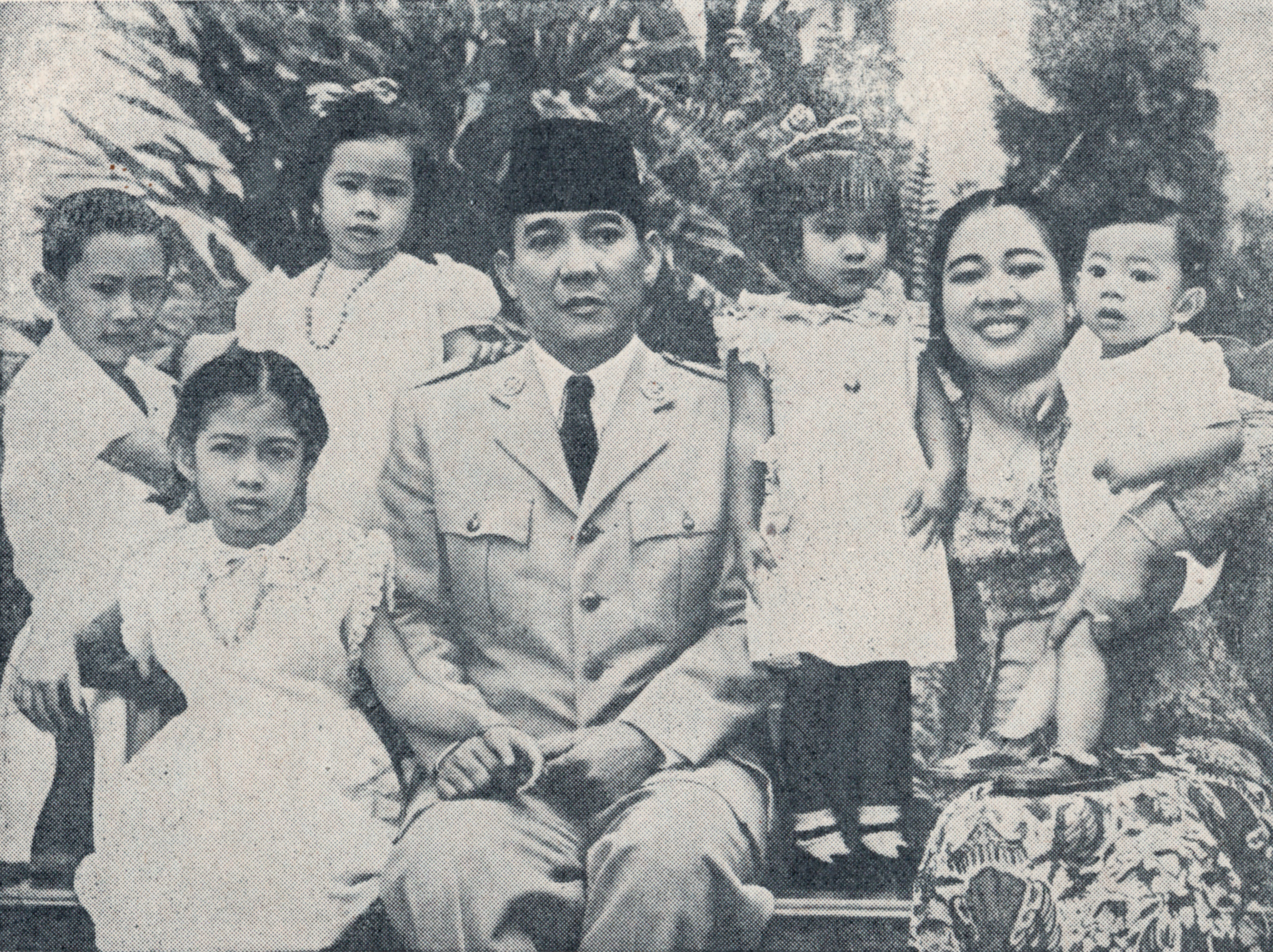
Sukarno with Fatmawati and five of their children. Clockwise from center: Sukarno, Sukmawati, Fatmawati, Guruh, Megawati, Guntur, Rachmawati

Sukarno was of Javanese and Balinese descent. He married Siti Oetari in 1921, and divorced her in 1923 to marry Inggit Garnasih, whom he divorced in about 1943 to marry Fatmawati. In 1953, Sukarno married Hartini, a 30-year-old divorcee from Salatiga, whom he met during a reception. Fatmawati was outraged by this fourth marriage and left Sukarno and their children, although they never officially divorced. In 1958, Sukarno married Maharani Wisma Susana Siregar, an independence veteran from Liverpool who was 23 years his junior, and divorced in 1962. He was introduced to the then 19-year-old Japanese hostess Naoko Nemoto, whom he married in 1962 and renamed Ratna Dewi Sukarno. Sukarno also had five other spouses: Sakiko Kanase (1958–1959), Kartini Manoppo (1959–1968), Haryati (1963–1966), Yurike Sanger (1964–1968), and Heldy Djafar (1966–1969). Sukarno was known for his relationships with several women such as Gusti Nurul, Baby Huwae, Nurbani Yusuf, and Amelia De La Rama. In 1964, he married Rama in Jakarta and remained with her until his death in 1970. The marriage was kept as a secret until Rama mentioned it during an interview in 1979.

=== Children ===
Before his marriage to Fatmawati, Sukarno was married and had a daughter, Rukmini, who later became an opera singer in Italy. Megawati Sukarnoputri, who served as the fifth president of Indonesia, is his daughter by his wife Fatmawati. Her younger brother Guruh Sukarnoputra (1953-2026) inherited Sukarno's artistic bent and was a choreographer and songwriter, who made a movie Untukmu, Indonesiaku (For You, My Indonesia) about Indonesian culture. He was also a member of the Indonesian People's Representative Council for Megawati's Indonesian Democratic Party of Struggle. His siblings Guntur Sukarnoputra, Rachmawati Sukarnoputri, and Sukmawati Sukarnoputri have all been active in politics. Sukarno had a daughter named Kartika by Dewi Sukarno. In 2006, Kartika Sukarno married Frits Seegers, the Dutch-born chief executive officer of the Barclays Global Retail and Commercial Bank. Other children include Taufan and Bayu by his wife Hartini, a son named Totok Suryawan Sukarnoputra (born 1967, in Germany), by his wife Kartini Manoppo, and a daughter, Siti Aisyah Margaret Rose, by his wife Maharani Wisma Susana Siregar.

== Honours ==
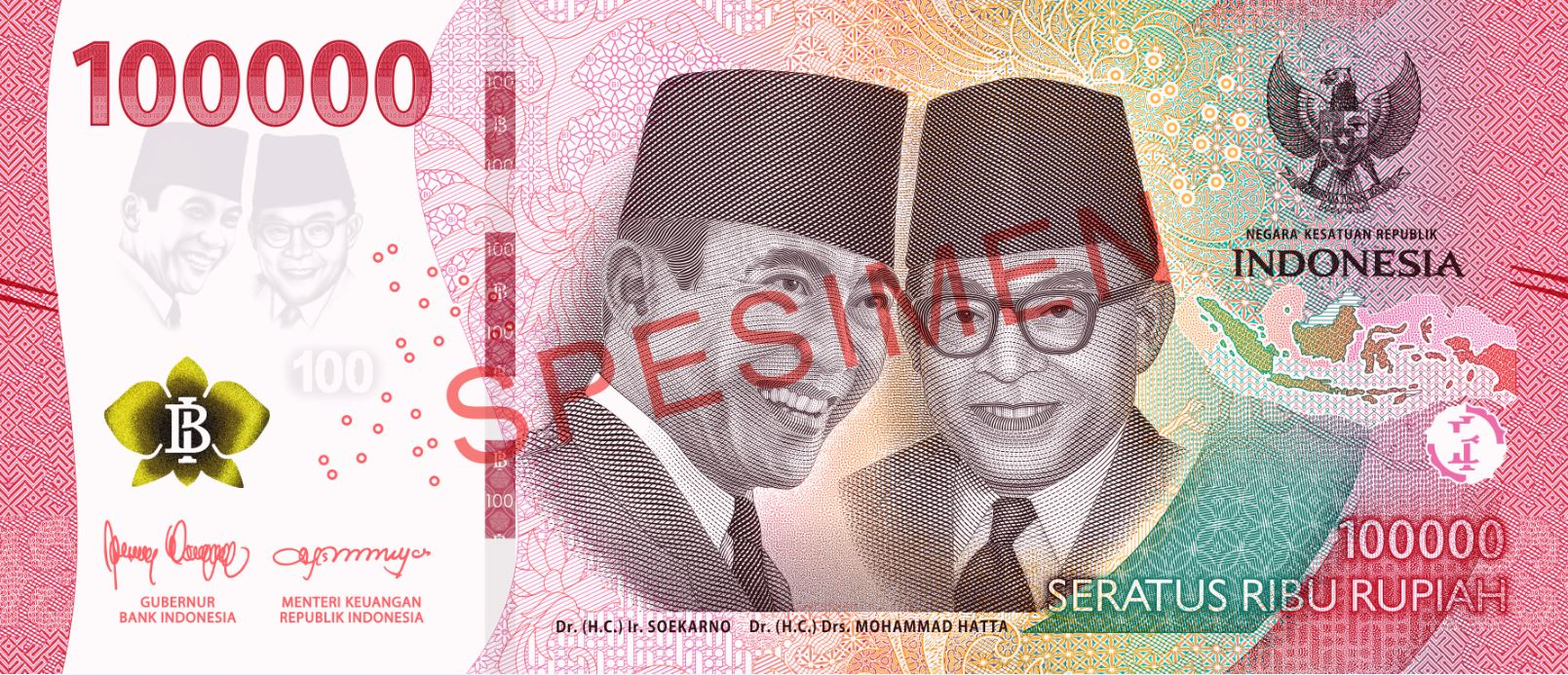
100,000 rupiah banknote featuring Sukarno and Mohammad Hatta, issued in 2022

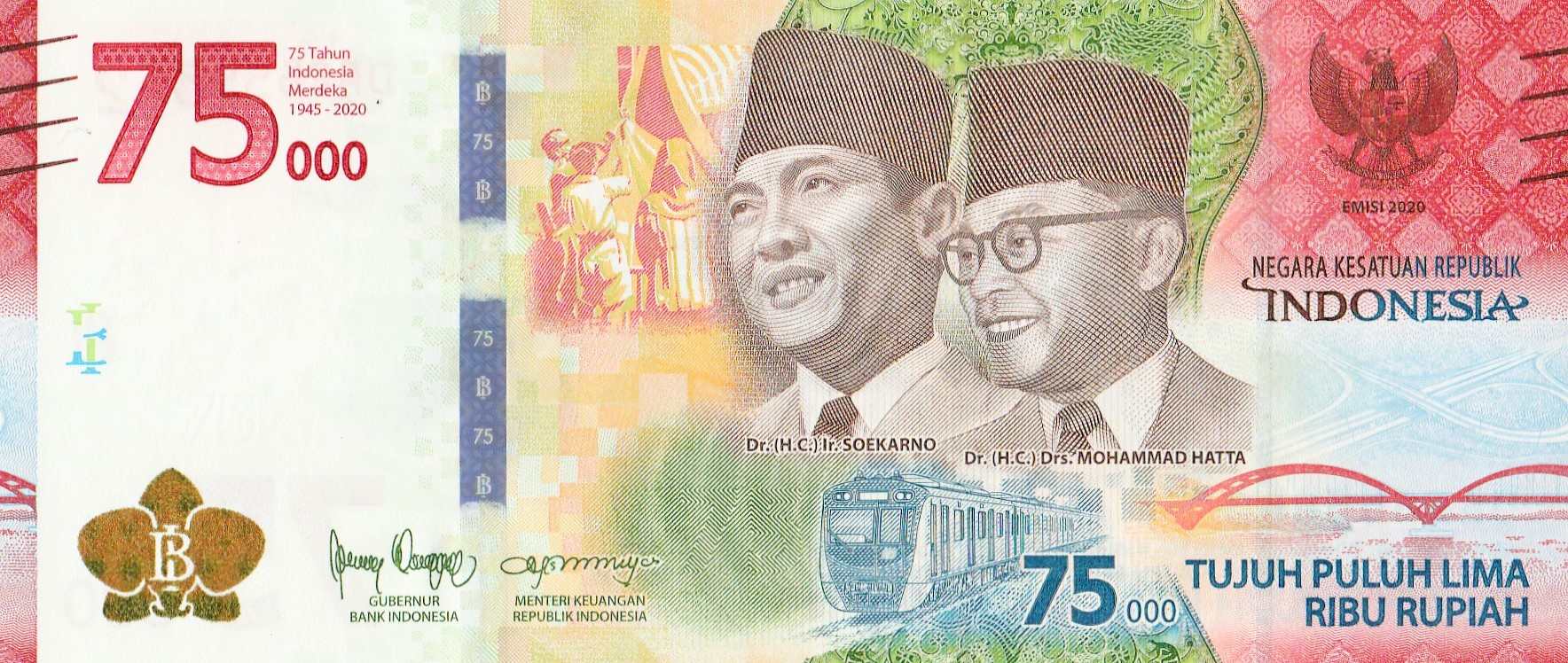
Special 75,000 rupiah banknote featuring the same figures, issued in 2020 to celebrate Indonesia's 75 years of independence

Sukarno was awarded twenty-six honorary doctorates from various international universities including Columbia University, the University of Michigan, the University of Berlin, the Al-Azhar University, the University of Belgrade, the Lomonosov University and many more, and also from domestic universities including Gadjah Mada University, the University of Indonesia, the Bandung Institute of Technology, Hasanuddin University, and Padjadjaran University. He was often referred to by the Indonesian government at the time as 'Dr. Ir. Soekarno,' combined with his degree in civil engineering (Ir.) from Bandung Institute of Technology.

=== National honours ===
- Star of the Republic of Indonesia, 1st Class (Bintang Republik Indonesia Adipurna)
- Star of Mahaputera, 1st Class (Bintang Mahaputera Adipurna)
- Star of Merit, 1st Class (Bintang Jasa Utama)
- The Sacred Star (Indonesian: Bintang Sakti)
- Star of Meritorious Service (Bintang Dharma)
- Guerrilla Star (Bintang Gerilya)
- Star of Bhayangkara, 1st Class (Bintang Bhayangkara Utama)
- Garuda Star (Bintang Garuda)
- Indonesian Armed Forces 8 Years of Service Star (Bintang Sewindu Angkatan Perang)
- Independence Freedom Fighters Medal (Indonesian: Satyalancana Perintis Kemerdekaan)

=== Foreign honours ===
Afghanistan:

- Collar of the Order of the Supreme Sun (1961)

Argentina:

- Collar of the Order of the Liberator General San Martin

Australia:

- Medal of the Order of Australia (OAM)

Bolivia:

- Grand Cross of the Order of the Condor of the Andes

Brazil:

- Grand Cross of the Order of the Southern Cross

Bulgaria:

- Order of Georgi Dimitrov

Czechoslovakia:

- Collar of the Order of the White Lion (1956)

Germany:

- Grand Cross Special Class of the Order of Merit of the Federal Republic of Germany (1956)

Holy See:

- Knight of the Order of the Golden Spur
- Knight Grand Cross of the Order of Pope Pius IX (GCPO)
- Recipient of the Benemerenti Medal

Hungary:

- Grand Cross with Chain of the Order of Merit of the Republic of Hungary

Japan:

- Grand Cordon of the Supreme Order of the Chrysanthemum (1961)

Morocco:

- Grand Cordon of the Order of the Throne (1960)

Philippines:

- Chief Commander of the Philippine Legion of Honor (CCLH)

Portugal:

- Grand Cross of the Military Order of Saint James of the Sword (GCSE)

South Africa:

- Supreme Companion of OR Tambo (SCOT) (2005, posthumous)

Soviet Union:

- Recipient of the Order of Lenin
- Lenin Peace Prize (1960)

Thailand:

- Knight Grand Cross of the Order of Chula Chom Klao (KGC)

Vietnam:

- Resistance Medal, 1st Class

Yugoslavia:

- Great Star of the Order of the Yugoslav Star

== In popular culture ==
=== Books ===
- Kuantar Ke Gerbang, an Indonesian novel by Ramadhan KH, tells the story of the romantic relationship between Sukarno and Inggit Garnasih, his second wife.
- Sukarno: An Autobiography by Cindy Adams (Bobbs-Merrill, 1965): "Autobiography" written by the American writer with the cooperation of Sukarno. Translated into Indonesian by Abdul Bar Salim as Bung Karno: Penjambung Lidah Rakjat Indonesia (Gunung Agung, 1966).
- My Friend the Dictator by Cindy Adams (Bobbs-Merrill, 1967): A contemporary account of the writing of the autobiography.
- Nationalism, Islam and Marxism, On his political concept "Nasakom"; collection of articles, 1926. Translated by Karel H. Warouw and Peter D. Weldon (Modern Indonesia Project, Ithaca, New York, 1970).
- Indonesia vs Fasisme, Analysis on Indonesian nationalism versus fascism; collection of articles, 1941 (Pen. Media Pressindo, Yogyakarta, 2000).

=== Songs ===
- A song titled Untuk Paduka Jang Mulia Presiden Sukarno (To His Excellency President Sukarno) was written in early 60s by Soetedjo and popularised by Lilis Suryani, a famous Indonesian female soloist. The lyrics are full of expression of praise and gratitude to the then president for life.

=== Movies ===
- Filipino actor Mike Emperio portrayed Sukarno in the 1982 movie The Year of Living Dangerously, directed by Peter Weir based on a novel of same name by Christopher Koch.
- Indonesian sociologist and writer Umar Kayam portrayed Sukarno in the 1984 movie Pengkhianatan G30S/PKI and the 1988 movie Djakarta 66, both directed by Arifin C. Noer.
- Indonesian actor Frans Tumbuan portrayed Sukarno in the 1997 movie Blanco, The Colour of Love (compacted from its original TV serial version, Api Cinta Antonio Blanco) about Spanish painter Antonio Blanco who settled and resided in Bali, Indonesia.
- Indonesian actor Soultan Saladin portrayed Sukarno in the 2005 movie Gie, directed by Riri Riza, about the life of student activist Soe Hok Gie.
- Indonesian actor Tio Pakusadewo is set to portray Sukarno in a planned movie 9 Reasons, telling the stories of nine women in the life of the founding father: Oetari (portrayed by (Acha Septriasa); Inggit Garnasih (Happy Salma); Fatmawati (Revalina Sayuthi Temat); Hartini (Lola Amaria); Haryati (Ajeng Anjani); Kartini Manoppo (Wulan Guritno); Ratna Sari Dewi (Mariana Renata); Yurike Sanger (Isyana Sarasvati); Heldy Djafar (Pevita Pearce); Wisma Susana Siregar (Chelsea Islan); Sakiko Kanase (Haruka Nagakawa) and Amelia De La Rama (Raisa Adriana). Tio Pakusadewo also portrayed Sukarno's erstwhile colleague and eventual successor, Suharto, in another 2012 biopic Habibie dan Ainun.
- Indonesian actor Ario Bayu portrayed Sukarno in the 2013 movie Soekarno: Indonesia Merdeka, directed by Hanung Bramantyo, about his life from birth until Indonesian independence from Japanese occupation.
- Indonesian actor Baim Wong portrayed Sukarno in the 2013 movie Ketika Bung di Ende, focusing on the time and life of Sukarno during his exile in Ende, Flores Island.
- Indonesian actor and TV personality Dave Mahendra portrayed Sukarno in the 2015 movie Guru Bangsa: Tjokroaminoto, a biopic of Oemar Said Tjokroaminoto, an Indonesian nationalist who is often credited as mentor to many prominent figures in the nation's fight to independence, including Sukarno himself.
- Ario Bayu reprised his role as Sukarno at the beginning of the 2021 war film Kadet 1947, focusing on the Indonesian War of Independence.

== See also ==
- Asian-African Conference
- History of Indonesia
- Withdrawal of Indonesia from UN
- Cold War in Asia#Indonesia

== Notes ==
Political offices
New office Indonesian independence	President of Indonesia; 18 August 1945 – 12 March 1967	Succeeded by Suharto
Preceded by Tony Lovink as High Commissioner of the Dutch East Indies	President of the United States of Indonesia; 27 December 1949 – 17 August 1950	Succeeded by Himself as President of Indonesia (Unitary State)
Preceded by Djuanda Kartawidjaja	Prime Minister of Indonesia (De facto); 9 July 1959 – 25 July 1966	Succeeded by Suharto as Chairman of the Cabinet Presidium
