= 2024 East Java gubernatorial election =

2024 East Java Gubernatorial election
- 27 November 2024
- Turnout: 70.13% (▲3.21pp)
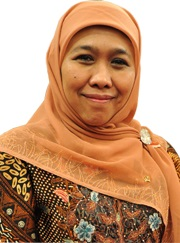

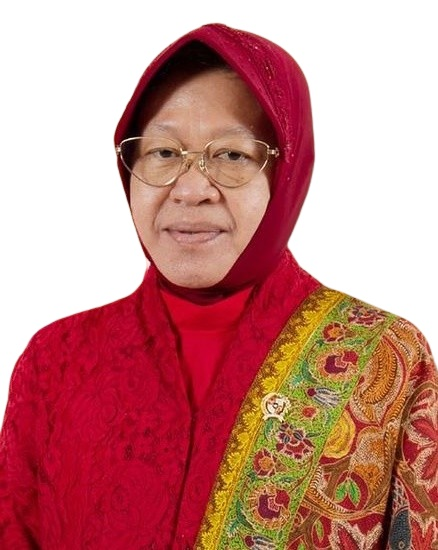

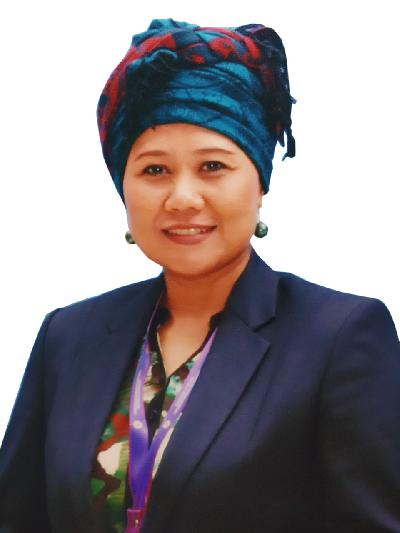
Candidate	Khofifah Indar Parawansa	Tri Rismaharini	Luluk Nur Hamidah
Party	PKB	PDI-P	PKB
Alliance	KIM Plus	–	–
Running mate	Emil Dardak	Zahrul Azhar Asumta	Lukmanul Khakim
Popular vote	12,192,165	6,743,095	1,797,332
Percentage	58.81%	32.52%	8.67%
- Results map by district
Governor before election
Adhy Karyono (acting)
Independent
Elected Governor
Khofifah Indar Parawansa
PKB

The 2024 East Java gubernatorial election was held on 27 November 2024 as part of nationwide local elections to elect the Governor of East Java for a five-year term. Former Governor Khofifah Indar Parawansa won the election in a landslide with 58% of the vote, although she lost heavily in Surabaya. Former Social Affairs Minister Tri Rismaharini of the Indonesian Democratic Party of Struggle (PDI-P) received 32%, and Luluk Nur Hamidah of the National Awakening Party (PKB) placed third with 8%.

== Electoral system ==
The election, like other local elections in 2024, follow the first-past-the-post system where the candidate with the most votes wins the election, even if they do not win a majority. It is possible for a candidate to run uncontested, in which case the candidate is still required to win a majority of votes "against" an "empty box" option. Should the candidate fail to do so, the election will be repeated on a later date.

== Candidates ==
According to electoral regulations, in order to qualify for the election, candidates were required to secure support from 24 seats in the East Java Regional House of Representatives (DPRD). The National Awakening Party (PKB), with 27 seats, is the only party eligible to nominate a candidate without forming a coalition with other parties. However, following a Constitutional Court of Indonesia decision in August 2024, the political support required to nominate a candidate was lowered to between 6.5 and 10 percent of the popular vote. Candidates may alternatively demonstrate support in form of photocopies of identity cards, which in East Java's case corresponds to 2.04 million copies. No independent candidates registered with the General Elections Commission for the gubernatorial election.

=== Declared ===
These are candidates who have been allegedly delegated by political parties endorsing for gubernatorial election:

1
Candidate from PKB
Luluk Nur Hamidah	Lukmanul Khakim
for Governor	for Vice Governor
Member of Parliament for Central Java IV (2019–2024)	Member of Parliament for East Java IX (2014–2019)
Parties
27 / 120 (23%) PKB (27 seats)

2
Incumbent Candidate from PKB and Demokrat
Khofifah Indar Parawansa	Emil Dardak
for Governor	for Vice Governor
Governor of East Java (2019–2024)	Vice Governor of East Java (2019–2024)
Parties
62 / 120 (52%) PAN (5 seats); Gerindra (21 seats); Demokrat (11 seats); Golkar (15 seats); NasDem (10 seats); PPP (4 seats); PSI (1 seat); PKS (5 seats)

3
Candidate from PDIP
Tri Rismaharini	Zahrul Azhar Asumta
for Governor	for Vice Governor
Minister of Social Affairs (2020–2024); Mayor of Surabaya (2010–2020)	Vice Rector of a university in Jombang
Parties
21 / 120 (18%) PDIP (21 seats)

=== Potential ===
The following are individuals who have either been publicly mentioned as a potential candidate, or considered as such by press:

- Achmad Fauzi (PDI-P), Regent of Sumenep (2021- ).
- Abdul Halim Iskandar (PKB), Minister of Villages, Development of Disadvantage Regions, and Transmigration (2019-2024).
- Anwar Sadad (Gerindra), Deputy Speaker and member of East Java Regional House of Representatives representing Probolinggo and Pasuruan (2019-2024), chairman of Gerindra's East Java branch.
- Baddrut Tamam (PKB), Regent of Pamekasan (2018-2023).
- Eri Cahyadi (PDI-P), Mayor of Surabaya (2021- ).
- Hanindhito Himawan Pramana (PDI-P), Regent of Kediri (2021- ).
- Marzuki Mustamar, former chairman of Nahdlatul Ulama's East Java branch.
- Muhaimin Iskandar (PKB), Chairman of the National Awakening Party, vice presidential candidate of the 2024 Indonesian national election, Deputy Speaker of the House of Representatives (2019-2024).
- Puti Guntur Soekarno (PDI-P), Member of House of Representatives representing Surabaya and Sidoarjo (2019- ) and granddaughter of 1st President of Indonesia Soekarno.
- Saifullah Yusuf, Secretary General of Nahdlatul Ulama (2022- ), Mayor of Pasuruan (2021- ), and former Vice Governor of East Java (2009-2019).
- Thoriqul Haq (PKB), Regent of Lumajang (2018-2023), member of East Java Regional House of Representatives.

== Political map ==
Following the 2024 Indonesian general election, ten political parties are represented in the East Java Regional House of Representatives:

Political parties	Seat count
National Awakening Party (PKB)	27 / 120
Indonesian Democratic Party of Struggle (PDI-P)	21 / 120
Great Indonesia Movement Party (Gerindra)	21 / 120
Party of Functional Groups (Golkar)	15 / 120
Democratic Party (Demokrat)	11 / 120
NasDem Party	10 / 120
Prosperous Justice Party (PKS)	5 / 120
National Mandate Party (PAN)	5 / 120
United Development Party (PPP)	4 / 120
Indonesian Solidarity Party (PSI)	1 / 120

== Results ==
Candidate	Running mate	Party	Votes	%
Khofifah Indar Parawansa	Emil Dardak	National Awakening Party	12,192,165	58.81
Tri Rismaharini	Zahrul Azhar Asumta	Indonesian Democratic Party of Struggle	6,743,095	32.52
Luluk Nur Hamidah	Lukmanul Khakim	National Awakening Party	1,797,332	8.67
Total			20,732,592	100.00
Valid votes			20,732,592	94.51
Invalid/blank votes			1,204,610	5.49
Total votes			21,937,202	100.00
Registered voters/turnout			31,280,418	70.13
Source: KPU

Candidate vote share by district
Luluk–Lukmanul

Khofifah–Emil

Rismaharani–Gus Hans
