= Hartini =

Fourth wife of Indonesian president Sukarno

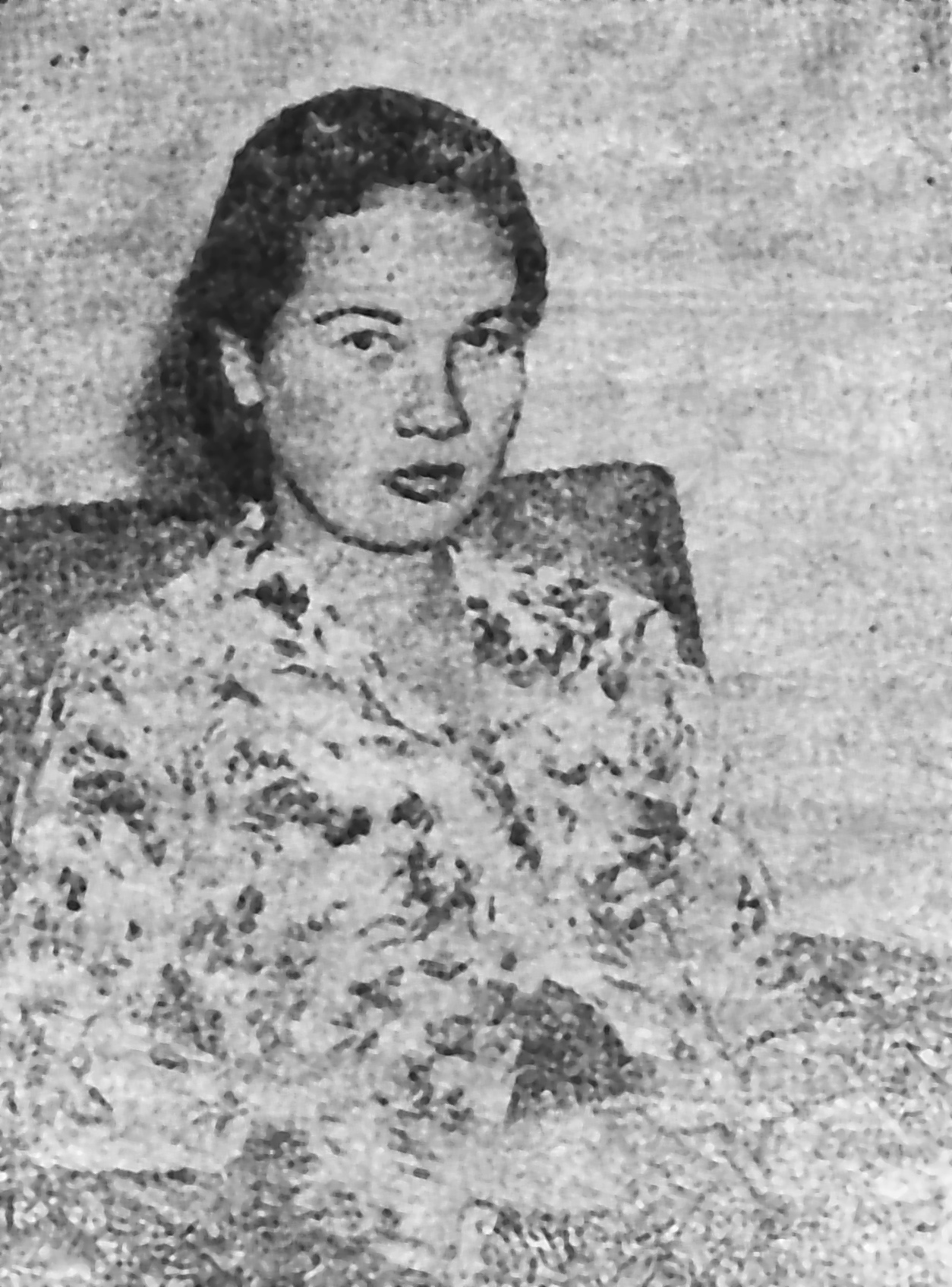
- Hartini in 1954
- Born: Siti Suhartini; 20 September 1924; Ponorogo, East Java, Dutch East Indies
- Died: 12 March 2002 (aged 77); Jakarta, Indonesia
- Other name: Hartini Sukarno
- Known for: Wife of Sukarno

Siti Suhartini (20 September 1924 – 12 March 2002), better known as Hartini and also as Hartini Sukarno, was the fourth wife of President Sukarno of Indonesia. Born to a forestry worker in Ponorogo, Hartini was married in her youth to a man named Suwondo, with whom she had five children. She met Sukarno in 1952, and after exchanging a series of pseudonymous love letters and receiving the blessings of his wife Fatmawati, the two were married on 7 July 1954. Their union faced outrage, including protests from pro-monogamy women's organizations and the mass media. Hartini was required to live at the Presidential Palace in Bogor rather than the main palace in Jakarta and was not recognized as first lady.

In the late 1950s, Hartini began to assume more of the responsibilities expected of a first lady, though without the title, travelling abroad as a representative, attending events, and delivering speeches. She also gained a reputation as a woman with influence on Sukarno, with whom she remained even as he continued to take other wives and conduct affairs. After the fall of Sukarno and transition to the New Order under President Suharto, Hartini was condemned for her leftist politics. She remained with Sukarno until his death in 1970, the only one of his wives not to leave him. In her widowhood, Hartini focused on providing for her children, selling several of Sukarno's gifts to supplement her income.

== Early life ==
Hartini was born Siti Suhartini in Ponorogo, East Java, Dutch East Indies (now Indonesia), on 20 September 1924. The second of five children born to a forestry worker named Murawi and his wife Mairah, her family frequently moved during her childhood. She began her primary studies at a Dutch-run school for indigenous children in Ponorogo, then continued in Malang after her family moved there in the early 1930s. To allow Hartini better access to education, she was adopted by a family friend named Oesman, who took her to Bandung, West Java, where she completed her elementary studies in 1938. This was followed by three years at a junior secondary school. At home, Hartini learned the traditional role of women in Javanese culture, which she sought to embody in her marriages: "a wife should be a mother, friend, and lover to her husband". (Note: Original: "... seorang istri harus menjadi ibu, kawan, dan kekasih bagi suami".) Her adoptive parents also enrolled her at the Njiverheidschool—a school for teaching domestic skills.

On 20 December 1942, Hartini entered an arranged marriage with an oil company worker named Suwondo. The couple moved to Salatiga, Central Java, where their union produced five children: Herwindo, Tri Herwanto, Sri Wulandari, Riswulan, and Sri Hariswati. Hartini and Suwondo divorced in the early 1950s, citing irreconcilable differences and frequent fights. The timeline of Hartini's divorce is disputed. Some writers, such as the journalist Rosihan Anwar, described them as having separated by the time Hartini met President Sukarno. Others, including the biographer Peter Kasenda, the Australian historian John Legge, and the American historian Theodore Friend, wrote that Hartini and Suwondo were still married when she was romanced by Sukarno. Hartini denied the latter claim, writing in 1970 that she was already divorced. Suwondo testified in court in 1954 that the couple had registered their divorce on 12 April 1954 but agreed to backdate it to 12 April 1952, with a verbal agreement taking place in January 1952.

== Meeting Sukarno ==
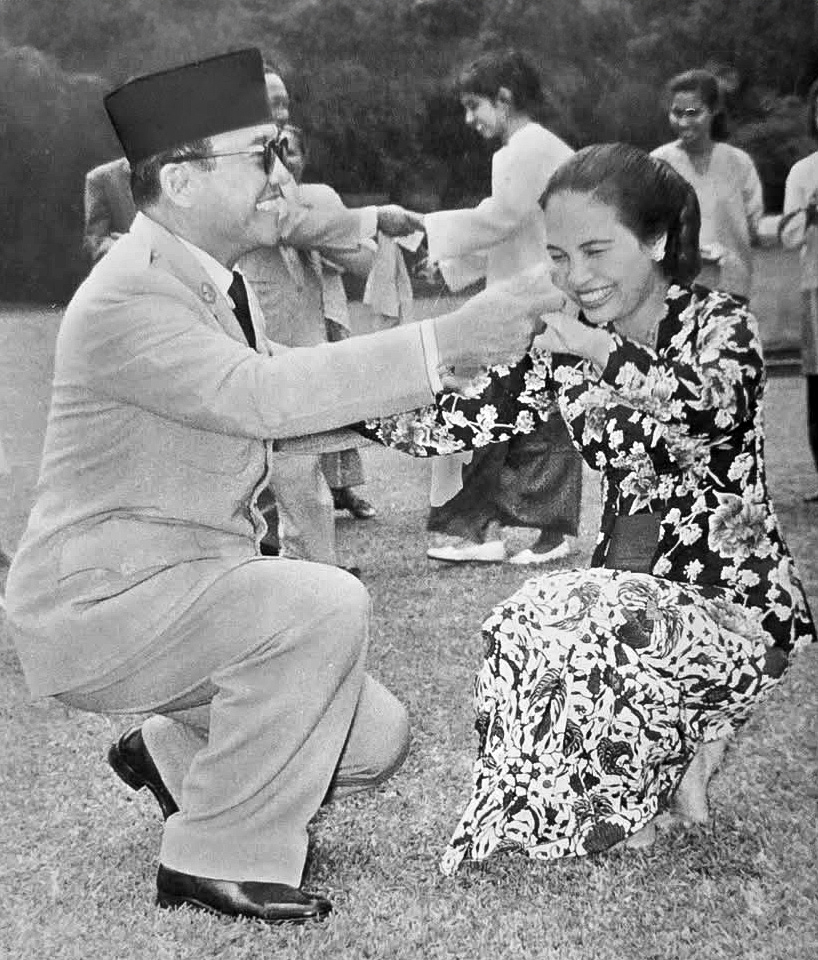
Hartini and Sukarno dancing in Maluku, 1958

In September 1952, Hartini met Sukarno as she was helping cater a dinner between the president and the mayor of Salatiga. On his way to Yogyakarta to inaugurate the Syuhada Mosque, Sukarno enjoyed the meal and asked who had cooked the sayur lodeh. The other women pushed Hartini forward, and she spoke briefly with Sukarno and shook his hand. Hartini and Sukarno felt a mutual attraction, despite the 23-year age difference. Hartini reportedly felt "smitten" by him from their first meeting, a feeling that deepened as she got to know the president better. Meanwhile, in his first letter, Sukarno wrote that he "was much moved" when he first saw Hartini; according to Friend, he was stimulated by Hartini's intelligence and sophistication.

Sukarno began sending Hartini love letters, over a hundred in total, through an intermediary identified by Anwar as General Gatot Soebroto and by Legge as Major General Soehardjo Hardjowardojo. Sukarno signed these letters with a pseudonym, Srihana, and referred to Hartini as Srihani; he later explained to Hartini that he had derived these names from a Javanese legend of inseparable lovers. During their affair, Hartini would regularly travel overland from Salatiga to Semarang, from which she would fly to Jakarta before heading to the Presidential Palace in Cipanas. The couple also met at Prambanan in 1953 when Sukarno inaugurated the Ramayana Ballet. Prime Minister Ali Sastroamidjojo urged Sukarno to maintain stability and avoid scandal by keeping his affair quiet. Sukarno countered that he loved Hartini deeply, and it would thus be immoral to keep her as a mere mistress.

On 15 January 1953, Sukarno asked his wife Fatmawati, who had given birth to their youngest son Guruh two days previously, permission to take Hartini as a second wife. She reluctantly agreed, despite being against the union, and Sukarno proposed. Hartini initially refused, for fear that she would be seen as stealing another woman's husband. However, Sukarno continued to propose, and Hartini agreed after Sukarno stated that he could not live without her and promised that she would be his "queen without a crown". (Note: Original: "... ratu yang tidak bermahkota".) Sukarno and Hartini were married on 7 July 1954 in a small ceremony at Cipanas. (Note: Initial reports indicated that the marriage was conducted in June 1954, and Hartini stated in a 1954 interview that she had met him at a wedding in Bogor (De Vrije Pers 1954a, p. 1). Hartini wrote in 1970 that they had been married on 7 July 1954 (Hartini 1970a, p. 49); this date was cited by the religious court in Salatiga when examining Hartini's divorce from Suwondo (De Nieuwsgier 1954c, p. 2) and included on a marriage document republished in Indonesia Raya in December 1955 (Nugroho 2009, p. 60). Legge (1972, p. 277), meanwhile, dated the marriage to 1955. Some recent sources have cited 1953 (Encyclopedia of Jakarta; Matanasi 2018; Kakiailatu 2002, p. 104).) It was Sukarno's fourth marriage, (Note: Before Fatmawati, Sukarno had been married to Siti Oetari (1921–1923) and Inggit Garnasih (1923–1943) (Chairulia 2025).) as well as his first polygamous marriage.

== Marriage ==
An Indonesia Raya article arguing that Sukarno and Hartini's marriage was illegitimate due to a misspelling, 5 December 1955

Sukarno concealed his relationship with Hartini from the public until it was reported by the newspaper Indonesia Raya in September 1954. It faced outrage both due to its timing and the ongoing effort to pass a new monogamous marriage law. Women's organizations then campaigning against polygamy in Indonesia, including the Indonesian Women's Congress, decried the union and deemed it degrading to women. Delegates from organizations in Jakarta met separately with Sukarno and Fatmawati to protest the marriage, while members of the Indonesian Women's Movement (Gerwani) were reported to have thrown objects at Hartini's home in Salatiga. In October 1955, eleven women's organizations collectively issued a statement that recognized Hartini as Sukarno's wife but rejected her as First Lady of Indonesia and urged the government to avoid using public funds for her. Several religious groups marched on the palace and conducted protests, which Sukarno recalled to have distressed him.

Newspapers such as Indonesia Raya and Pedoman carried editorials against the marriage. Some called for Sukarno's resignation or challenged the legitimacy of the marriage, (Note: For example, the daily Pemandangan argued that, if Hartini had only divorced in April 1954, she had yet to complete the waiting period mandated by Islamic law by the time of her marriage (De Vrije Pers 1954b, p. 1); this argument was dismissed by the religious court in Salatiga in late 1954, which ruled that Hartini had completed her waiting period (De Nieuwsgier 1954c, p. 2). Meanwhile, Indonesia Raya argued that a misspelling of Sukarno's name on the marriage licence rendered it invalid; the newspaper printed more than a hundred stories about Sukarno and Hartini between September and December 1954 (Nugroho 2009, p. 81).) though others such as Suluh Indonesia and Berita Minggu considered the controversy an attempt to undermine Sukarno. Coverage of the marriage and ensuing controversy extended internationally, with editorials condemning the marriage published in British Malaya and the Philippines. The Indonesian government established a council to protect Sukarno's good name in 1954, though it only succeeded after the military implemented a policy prohibiting provocative media coverage in September 1956.

According to Friend and Legge, Hartini's relationship with Sukarno increased his political determination and improved his confidence. She, however, was ostracized from Jakarta's high society through the 1950s; Vice-President Mohammad Hatta, for example, would leave a room if Hartini entered. (Note: Hatta and Hartini became more cordial after Sukarno's death (Tempo 2002).) In 1954, Sukarno promised that Hartini would not be introduced to the Indonesian public, and after a controversial attempt in 1955 she was no longer brought on official business. She was consciously excluded from major political events, including Mothers' Day celebrations as well as the 1955 Bandung Conference. Her involvement in official functions was generally limited to small and intimate ones. Officially, Fatmawati remained first lady, though she had moved out of the palace and unsuccessfully sought a divorce. (Note: This arrangement was reportedly part of a promise made by Sukarno to his eldest son, Guntur (Legge 1972, p. 277), who like his mother rejected Sukarno's marriage to Hartini (McIntyre 2005, p. 142). Hartini also considered it more proper for Fatmawati to retain the role (Nugroho 2009, p. 54). Fatmawati's continued status as first lady was supported by the women's movement; modelling their ideal first lady on Eleanor Roosevelt, the movement held that Indonesia could only have a singular first lady (Sullivan 2020, p. 289).) Writing in 1970, Hartini recalled, "In some ways, it was harder to be the second wife of the President than his mistress."

Hartini was not permitted to live at the Merdeka Palace in Jakarta. Rather, she lived at the Presidential Palace in Bogor, seeing Sukarno only on the weekends. They generally spent their days together in a secondary building, using the main palace only to receive guests. During the week, they communicated twice daily by telephone, though Sukarno slept in Jakarta. Hartini brought her children from her first marriage to Bogor, and had two more sons with Sukarno, Taufan (b. 1955) and Bayu (b. 1958). To allow him easier access to the children, Suwondo was provided a job in Jakarta.

== Dominance in Bogor ==
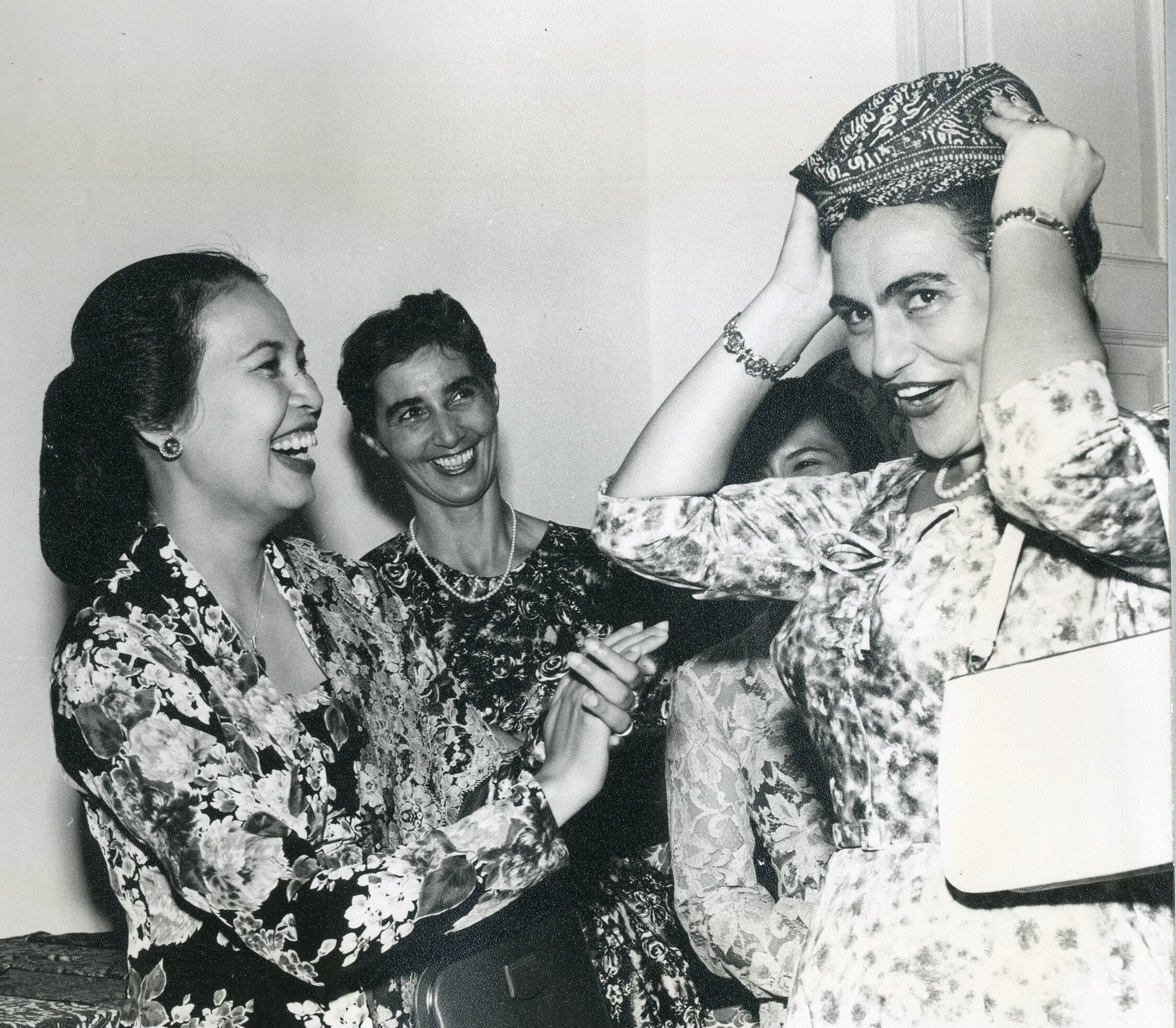
Hartini (left) with First Lady of Yugoslavia Jovanka Broz (right), c. 1959

By the late 1950s, Hartini had developed increased political acumen, despite her status as a second wife creating protocol problems at state functions. (Note: Speaking to Cindy Adams, Sukarno cited protocol issues as his reason for generally travelling internationally without his wives (Sukarno & Adams 1966, p. 284). Writing in 1970, Hartini (1970a, p. 57) attributed Sukarno's preference for solo travels to his desire to continue his extramarital affairs.) She met with numerous heads of state, including Akihito of Japan, Ho Chi Minh of Vietnam, Norodom Sihanouk of Cambodia, and Josip Broz Tito of Yugoslavia. She also represented Indonesia abroad on several occasions, including Yugoslavia in 1960 and China and Poland in 1962, and reaffirmed alliances with the Eastern Bloc. In Indonesia, Hartini delivered speeches and attended official functions, at times accompanying Sukarno. (Note: For example, Hartini accompanied Sukarno to the opening of the fifth National Sports Week in Bandung in 1961. She represented the president at several points during the Games of the New Emerging Forces in 1963 and during the National Book Exhibition in 1965 (Nugroho 2009, pp. 116–120).) Although during this period she took more of the roles expected of the first lady, while Fatmawati distanced herself from the role, Hartini never officially held the title; when a 1963 women's congress considered such a proposal, Sukarno interrupted his presidential duties to attend the congress, remove Hartini, and order her return to Bogor.

While still forbidden from attending the palace in Jakarta, where Sukarno lived with four of his children by Fatmawati, (Note: After leaving the palace, Fatmawati continued to live in Jakarta with Guntur (Sukarno & Adams 1966, p. 285).) Hartini established what Legge describes as "a court of her own" in Bogor. Access to Hartini meant easier access to the president. Government officials—including Communist Party of Indonesia (PKI) leaders such as DN Aidit and Njoto—attempted to curry her favour, while the wives of General Ahmad Yani and Minister of Foreign Affairs Subandrio were rumoured to maintain good relations with her for the sake of their husbands. This influence was also recognized by international dignitaries; when Cindy Adams was preparing her biography of the president, United States ambassador Howard P. Jones urged her to interview Hartini. Adams later described Hartini as "Sukarno's number two-wife, but ... number one in power and prestige."

Although Hartini exerted significant influence through and on Sukarno, she did not have a monopoly on her husband, who developed a reputation as a womanizer. He refused to divorce Fatmawati, stating that he still loved her. Likewise, although Sukarno promised Hartini that she would be his last wife, he later married Ratna Sari Dewi in 1961, Haryati in 1963, and Yurike Sanger in 1964. He spent his weekends with Hartini and weekdays with his other wives, but attempted to conceal these other marriages from Hartini. (Note: Hartini (1970b, pp. 40, 43) wrote that she had been aware of Dewi as early as 1960, but Sukarno refused to acknowledge their marriage to her until after his house arrest, when he urged Hartini to accept her as a sister.) He also conducted numerous affairs, which Hartini stopped inquiring about under threat of abandonment. In a 1999 interview, Hartini recalled, "He truly loved beauty, and the beauty found in women's graces." (Note: Original: "Dia sangat mencintai keindahan, dan juga keindahan dalam kecantikan wanita.") She explained that it had taken her three years to learn to accept Sukarno as he was, though even then it remained a burden.

== Fall from power ==
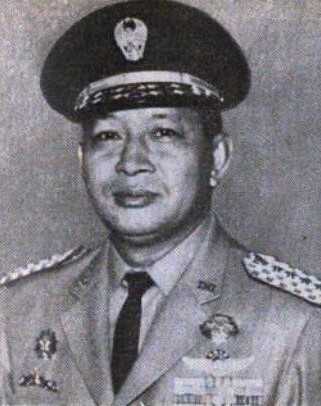
Suharto, who ousted Sukarno between 1966 and 1967

In September 1965, an unsuccessful coup was undertaken by a group identifying itself as the 30 September Movement (Gerakan 30 September, or G30S). Subsequently, student demonstrations called for the dissolution of the PKI, which had been blamed for the coup, as well as reduced inflation and the end of Sukarno's rule. Protests erupted in front of several presidential palaces. Among protestors' complaints were Sukarno's numerous wives. At Hartini's domicile in Bogor, students vandalized the walls with phrases such as "sarang sipilis" (lit. 'syphilis nest') and "lonte agung istana" ('grand palace whore'). This vandalism reportedly infuriated Sukarno, who called ten student representatives to his office and yelled at them.

Ultimately, Sukarno entrusted Suharto with ensuring security in Indonesia through the Order of Eleven March, which was signed in front of Hartini at the Bogor Palace in 1966. Suharto consolidated power and installed his allies in the government, undermining Sukarno's authority. When Hartini asked Sukarno if he remained president, he did not answer, stating only that he felt Suharto had manipulated the powers granted to him to take control of the government. On 12 March 1967 Sukarno was formally removed from the presidency by the People's Consultative Assembly, which cited his failure to fulfil his constitutionally mandated duties. Suharto was installed as his replacement, initially in an acting capacity.

During the transitionary period, Hartini faced accusations that she was aligned with leftist organizations, such as the now-banned Gerwani, and that she had channeled funds to the Communist Party. Based on such reports, she was interrogated by the new regime. In October 1968, the Associated Press reported that Hartini had been arrested and charged with supporting Sukarno's continued political activity; the report was refuted by Sutikno Lukitodisastro, the presidential secretary for Suharto. United Press International reported that several of Sukarno's wives blamed Hartini and her leftist politics for his downfall.

Removed from power, Sukarno divided his time between Hartini in Bogor and his other wives in Jakarta. Over time, these wives left him, with Hartini the only one to remain with the former president. Initially, she remained at the palace in Bogor, sometimes receiving visits from Sukarno's children, under the supervision of the state apparatus. On 1 July 1968, Hartini was removed from the palace and relocated to nearby Batu Tulis. (Note: This was part of a broader effort by the new government to remove Sukarno's family from the national palaces. Four of his children by Fatmawati—Megawati, Sukmawati, Rachmawati, and Guruh—had been removed from Merdeka Palace in August 1967 (Nugroho 2009, p. 168).) As Sukarno's health failed, Hartini petitioned for the government to provide him with healthcare. Later, when Sukarno began house arrest at Wisma Yaso in Jakarta, Hartini was often denied access to him.

In late 1969, Hartini began to see Sukarno with increasing frequency, with daily visits beginning in mid-1970. She later recalled that she had spent four months with Sukarno at his bedside, the only one he would allow to treat him, as her ailing husband sank into a depression. After Sukarno's death on 21 June 1970, Hartini petitioned Suharto to allow his burial at Batu Tulis, though this request was denied and Sukarno was ultimately buried in a tomb in Blitar. (Note: Hartini made this petition alongside Dewi, who had left Indonesia in 1966 but returned to Jakarta to visit Sukarno on his deathbed (Legge 1972, p. 409). When explaining his rationale for burying Sukarno in Blitar, Suharto argued that Sukarno should be buried near his mother (Nugroho 2009, p. 208). According to Legge (1972, p. 409), Suharto may have wished to avoid creating a place of pilgrimage near Jakarta.) Sukarno's daughter Rachmawati wrote in her memoirs that, although she had been angered by Hartini's role in Sukarno's separation from Fatmawati, these feelings gave way to a new respect as Hartini faithfully accompanied her father.

== Widowhood and death ==
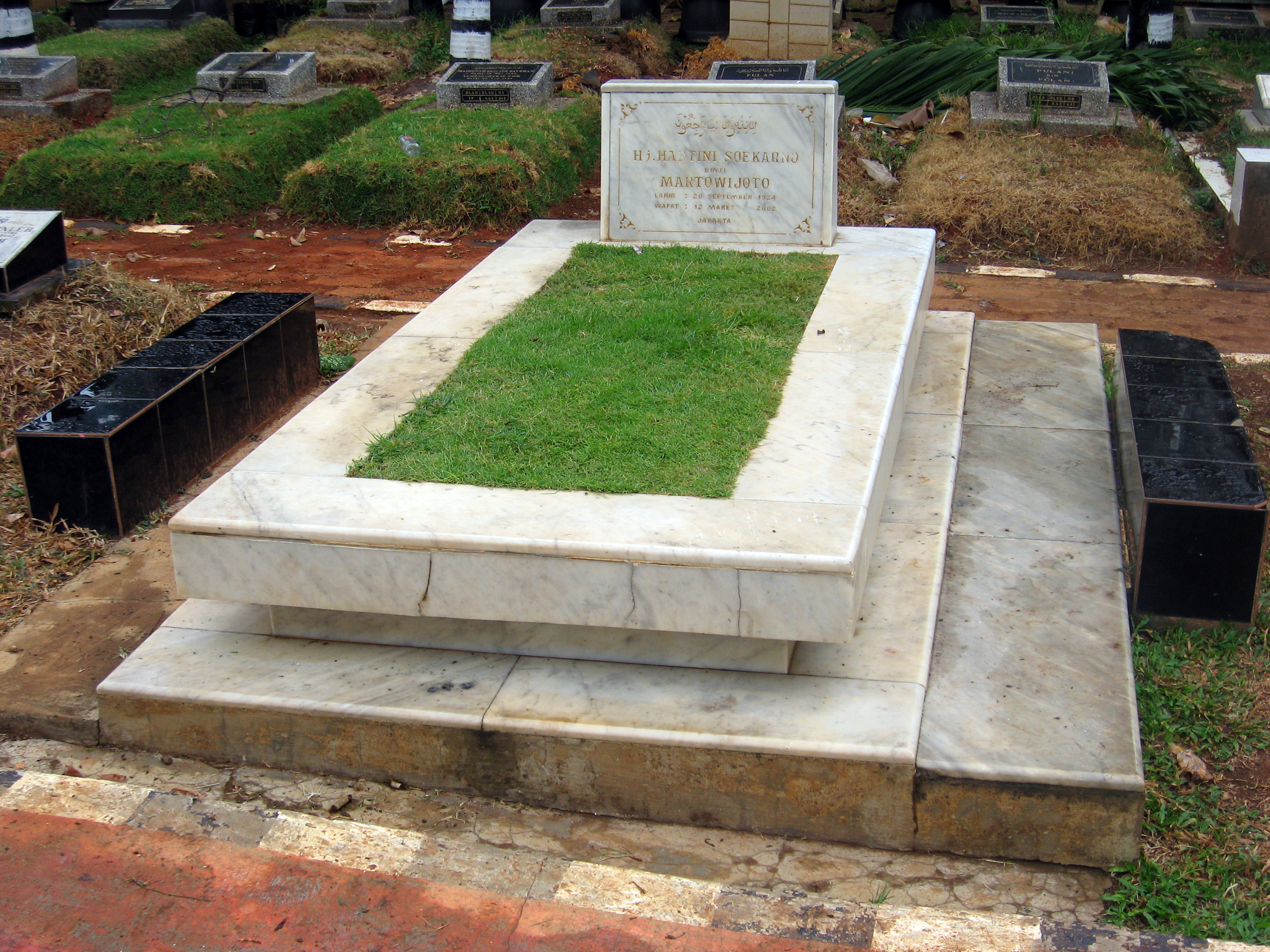
Hartini's grave at Karet Bivak Cemetery

Following Sukarno's death, Hartini had no income; only in 1983, after a lengthy period of de-Sukarnoization, did she begin to receive a portion of the pension allocated to Sukarno's wives. (Note: The law providing for this pension was passed in 1978. The other two shares were allocated to Fatmawati and Dewi (Tempo 1978, p. 6), though Fatmawati died before payments were made (Nugroho 2009, p. 221).) To support Taufan and Bayu, she operated a series of small businesses. These were generally unsuccessful, and thus Hartini sold many of the gifts she had received from Sukarno. These included a house in Bogor as well as paintings by Indonesian artists such as Affandi, S. Sudjojono, and Lee Man Fong. Hartini dedicated her spare time to charity, attended functions related to Sukarno's family, and represented Sukarno at state functions, including when he was declared a "Proclamator Hero" in 1986. She generally avoided politics.

By 1999, Hartini was living in Central Jakarta, filling her days with social activities and housework. In her old age, Hartini developed a heart condition, for which she received regular medical care and was hospitalized several times. In March 2002, she was admitted to the Metropolitan Medical Centre Hospital in Jakarta. She died on 11 March after three days in a coma. Hartini was buried at Karet Bivak Cemetery in a military funeral after a wake led by her stepdaughter, President Megawati Sukarnoputri. Attendees included her surviving children and step-children, (Note: Taufan had died in 1986 while undertaking his doctoral studies in the United States (Nugroho 2009, p. 224).) Vice-President Hamzah Haz, former vice-president Try Sutrisno, and former governor Ali Sadikin.

== Works cited ==
- Adams, Cindy (1967). My Friend the Dictator. Indianapolis: Bobbs-Merrill. OCLC 67027230.
- Alden, Robert (30 December 1955). "Sukarno Is Beset by Marital Woes: Wife No. 1 Reported Seeking to Divorce the President as Indonesians Differ". The New York Times. New York. p. 3. ProQuest 113304635.
- Beech, Keyes (27 September 1962). "Lovely Hartini Graces Diplomatic Love Match". The Minneapolis Star. Minneapolis. p. 12.
- Chairulia, Putri Atika (21 September 2025). "Pernah Nikah 9 Kali, Siapa Saja Istri Presiden Soekarno? Ini Profilnya" [Married 9 Times, Who Were the Wives of President Soekarno? Here Are Their Profiles] (in Indonesian). Antara. Archived from the original on 18 June 2026.
- Erdian (28 July 2003). "Hartini Soekarno Meninggal Dunia" [Hartini Soekarno Dies]. Tempo (in Indonesian). Jakarta. Archived from the original on 18 June 2026.
- Forshee, Jill (2006). Culture and Customs of Indonesia. New York: Bloomsbury Publishing US. ISBN 978-1-56750-998-4.
- Friend, Theodore (2003). Indonesian Destinies. Cambridge, Massachusetts: Belknap Press. ISBN 978-0-674-01137-3.
- Hartini (9 December 1970). "An Oriental Love Story". The Australian Women's Weekly. pp. 48–49, 51, 57, 59.
- Hartini (16 December 1970). "An Oriental Love Story: Second of Two Parts". The Australian Women's Weekly. pp. 40–41, 43.
- "Hartini: Not Arrested". The Age. Melbourne. 7 October 1968. p. 10.
- "Hartini Soekarno". Encyclopedia of Jakarta (in Indonesian). Jakarta City Government. Archived from the original on 4 August 2016.
- "Hartini Sukarno". The Ann Arbor News. Ann Arbor, Michigan. 12 March 2002. p. 20.
- Hughes, John (1968). The End of Sukarno: A Coup that Misfired, A Purge that Ran Wild. London: Angus & Robertson. ISBN 978-0-207-94971-5.
- Ichram, Yayi; Kleden, Hermien Y. (8 August 1999). "Hartini Sukarno: 'Saya Tidak Merebut Bung Karno'" [Hartini Sukarno: 'I Didn't Steal Bung Karno']. Tempo (in Indonesian). Vol. 28, no. 24. Jakarta. p. 32.
- "Indonesia Raya Beveelt Aftreden President" [Indonesia Raya Calls for President's Resignation]. De Vrije Pers (in Dutch). Surabaya. 5 October 1954. p. 1.
- "Interview Met Mevrouw Hartini Soekarno" [Interview with Mrs. Hartini Soekarno]. De Vrije Pers (in Dutch). Surabaya. 22 September 1954. p. 1.
- Kakiailatu, Toeti (17 March 2002). "Di Sana, Srihani Berjumpa dengan Srihana" [There, Srihani Met with Srihana]. Tempo (in Indonesian). Vol. 31, no. 3. Jakarta. p. 104.
- Legge, John D. (1972). Sukarno: A Political Biography. London: Penguin Books. ISBN 978-0-7139-0244-0.
- Matanasi, Petrik (11 March 2018). "Ketika Sukarno Kepincut Hartini" [When Sukarno Was Taken by Hartini]. Tirto.id. Archived from the original on 18 June 2026.
- McIntyre, Angus (2005). The Indonesian Presidency: The Shift from Personal Toward Constitutional Rule. Lanham: Rowman & Littlefield. ISBN 978-1-4616-0465-5.
- "Meninggal Dunia" [Died]. Tempo (in Indonesian). Vol. 10, no. 13. Jakarta. 24 May 1980. p. 22.
- "Menyorot Lagi Bung Karno" [Re-Examining Bung Karno]. Tempo (in Indonesian). Vol. 16, no. 38. Jakarta. 15 November 1986. p. 21.
- "Mevr. Hartini Soekarno Passeert Djakarta" [Mrs. Hartini Soekarno Passes through Jakarta]. De Nieuwsgier (in Dutch). Jakarta. 25 September 1954. p. 1.
- "Mevrouw F. Soekarno wil Scheiden" [Mrs. F. Soekarno Seeks a Divorce]. De Nieuwsgier (in Dutch). Jakarta. 30 December 1955. p. 1.
- "Mrs. Sukarno Guest". Tulsa Daily World. Tulsa, Oklahoma. 3 April 1960. p. 15.
- Nugroho, Arifin Suryo (2009). Srihana–Srihani: Biografi Hartini Sukarno [Srihana–Srihani: A Biography of Hartini Sukarno] (in Indonesian). Yogyakarta: Ombak. ISBN 978-602-8335-13-3.
- "P. Hartini Sukarno z Wizyta w Karolinie" [Mrs. Hartini Sukarno Visits Karolin]. Trybuna Ludu (in Polish). Warsaw. 1 June 1962. p. 2.
- "Presidential Crisis in Indonesia". The Guardian. London. 5 October 1954. p. 7.
- Sitompul, Martin (20 April 2018). "Hartini, First Lady yang Tak Diakui" [Hartini, the Unrecognized First Lady]. Historia (in Indonesian). Archived from the original on 16 November 2025.
- Sitompul, Martin (24 April 2018). "Ketika Srihani Jadi Ibu Negara" [When Srihani Was First Lady]. Historia (in Indonesian). Archived from the original on 18 June 2026.
- "Soewondo–Hartini voor de Rechter" [Soewondo–Hartini Before the Judge]. De Nieuwsgier (in Dutch). Jakarta. 18 November 1954. p. 1.
- Stone, Richard L. (9 July 1967). "Sukarno Today Beaten, Lonely". The Register-Guard. Eugene, Oregon. p. 6.
- Sukarno; Adams, Cindy (1966). Sukarno; An Autobiography. Hong Kong: Gunung Agung. OCLC 2159630.
- "Sukarno's Wife Arrested". The Sydney Morning Herald. Sydney. 5 October 1968. p. 3.
- Sullivan, Charles P. (2020). Years of Dressing Dangerously: Modern Women, National Identity and Moral Crisis in Sukarno's Indonesia, 1945–1966 (PhD. dissertation). University of Michigan. ProQuest 2479689097.
- "Tampaknya Sulit Akur" [Seems Hard to Reconcile]. Tempo (in Indonesian). Vol. 8, no. 41. Jakarta. 9 December 1978. p. 6.
- "The Fallout of the Duumvirate". Tempo. Jakarta. 19 August 2002. ProQuest 198892149.
- Tifada, Detha Arya (17 June 2021). "Soekarno Murka Istrinya Hartini Dicap 'Lonte Agung' oleh Mahasiswa Angkatan 66" [Sukarno Furious His Wife Hartini Branded 'Lonte Agung' by Class of '66]. Voice of Indonesia (in Indonesian). Archived from the original on 18 June 2026.
- "Tweede Huwelijk Wettig" [Second Marriage Legalized]. De Nieuwsgier (in Dutch). Jakarta. 22 December 1954. p. 2.
- "Ulang Tahun Guruh" [Guruh's Birthday]. Tempo (in Indonesian). Vol. 22, no. 47. Jakarta. 23 January 1993. p. 38.
- "Vrouwendelegatie Laakt Houding President" [Women Delegates Criticize President's Attitude]. Het Nieuwsblad voor Sumatra (in Dutch). Medan. 26 September 1955. p. 1.
