= Sukarnoputri =

Sukarnoputri is an Indonesian patronymic. Notable people with this patronymic include:

- Fatmawati Sukarnoputri (1923–1980), National Hero of Indonesia; mother of Megawati
- Megawati Sukarnoputri (born 1947), Indonesian politician
- Rachmawati Sukarnoputri (1950–2021), Indonesian politician
- Sukmawati Sukarnoputri (born 1951), daughter of Fatmawati
