= Guntur Soekarnoputra =

Eldest son of President Sukarno (born 1944)

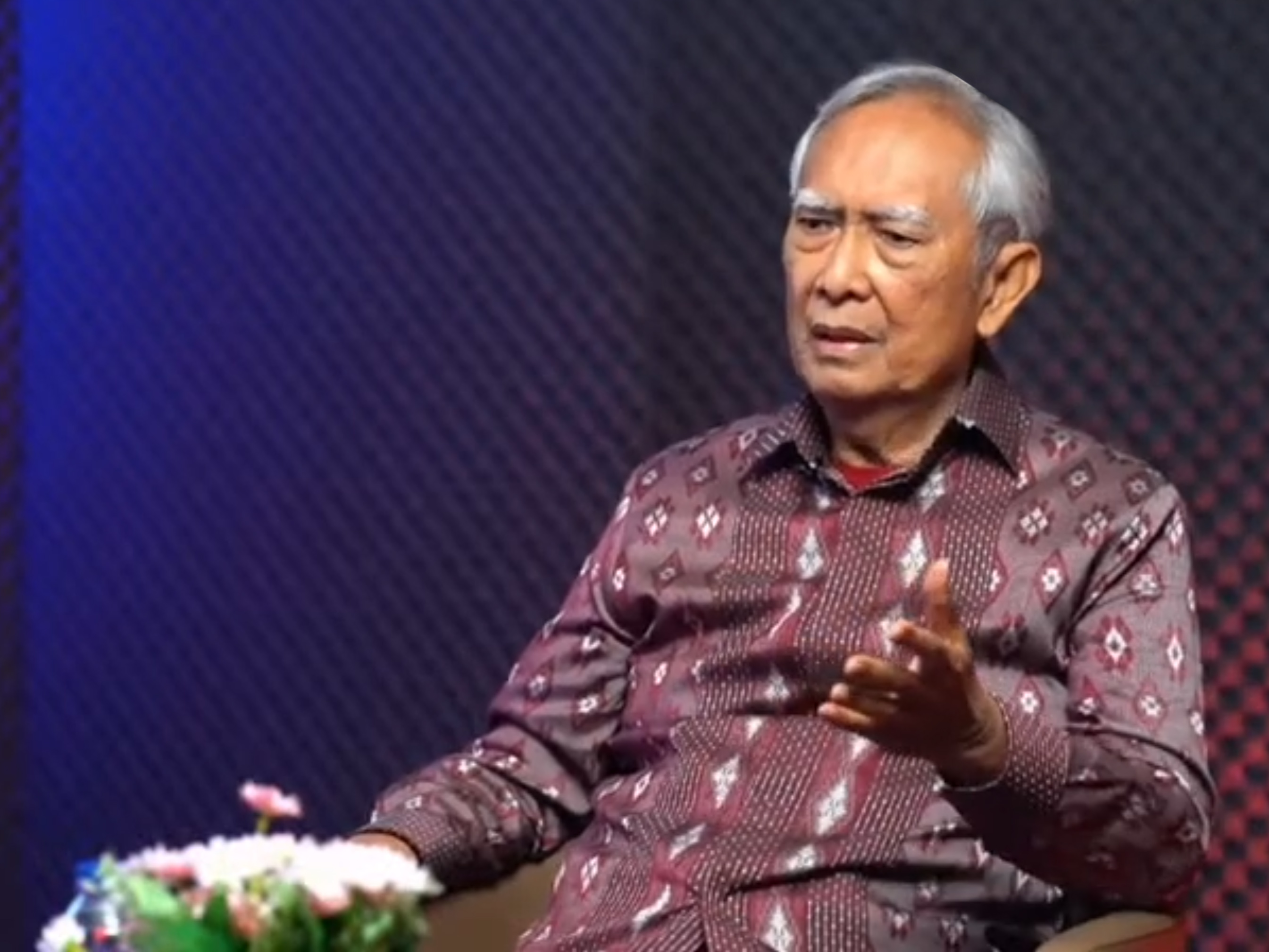
- Guntur speaking in 2022
- Born: Mohammad Guntur Soekarnoputra; 3 November 1944 (age 82); Jakarta, Dutch East Indies
- Occupation: Entrepreneur
- Known for: Son of Sukarno

Mohammad Guntur Soekarnoputra (born 3 November 1944), better known as Guntur Soekarnoputra or Guntur Soekarno, is an Indonesian entrepreneur best known as the eldest son of President Sukarno and Fatmawati. During his infancy, Guntur was abducted along with his parents during the Rengasdengklok Incident of 16 August 1945. In the national revolution that followed Sukarno's proclamation of Indonesian independence the following day, Guntur was entrusted to several friends of Sukarno while his father led the country. In 1949, following Dutch recognition of Indonesian independence, the family moved to Jakarta and settled at the Presidential Palace. After his parents separated in 1955, Guntur lived with Fatmawati. However, he remained involved with Sukarno, joining him on trips to the United States and Yugoslavia.

Sukarno was overthrown in 1967. After his father's death in 1970, Guntur was initially expected to continue Sukarno's political legacy. However, despite briefly campaigning for the Indonesian National Party ahead of the 1971 legislative election, he focused more on supporting his family through his construction business. Since then, Guntur has mostly avoided politics, the only one of his siblings to do so. He has written memoirs on his childhood, campaigned to rehabilitate his father's reputation, and held several photography exhibitions. His daughter Puti has served in the House of Representatives.

== Biography ==
=== Early years ===
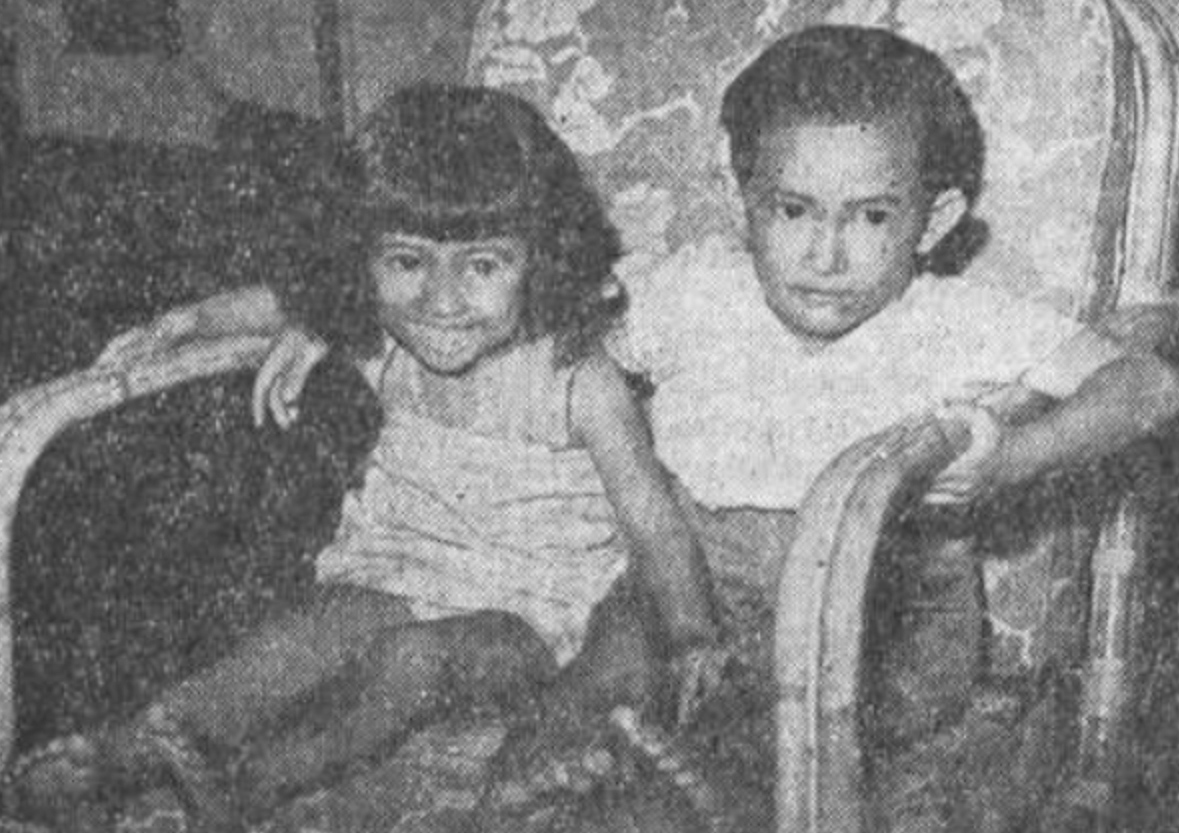
Megawati and Guntur sharing a chair, 1950

Guntur was born to Sukarno and Fatmawati on 3 November 1944 in Jakarta, Dutch East Indies. At the time, Sukarno was an established nationalist leader and the principal advisor to the Japanese occupation government. Previously, he had used the name "Guntur" (lit. 'thunder') as an alias when writing critically about the Dutch colonial government. The name Soekarnoputra, meanwhile, means 'son of Sukarno'.

Towards the end of the Second World War, Sukarno had made steps towards realizing Indonesian independence, as promised by the Japanese. To expedite this, on 16 August 1945 a group of pemuda (youths) abducted Sukarno alongside Fatmawati and Guntur in what became known as the Rengasdengklok Incident. The family were taken away in a black Fiat, which was forced to stop briefly near Bogor while Fatmawati breastfed Guntur. Upon reaching Rengasdengklok, as Sukarno and Mohammad Hatta were pressured to formally announce Indonesian independence, a crying Guntur—still not a year old—was passed between the adults.

The following day, Sukarno proclaimed Indonesian independence. Over the next four years, Sukarno led the country through the Indonesian National Revolution. The infant Guntur and his sister Megawati, born in 1947, were sheltered on several occasions. According to the curator Dullah, Sukarno entrusted Guntur to the artist Ernest Dezentjé after the Dutch began their First Police Action in 1947. In 1948, following the Second Police Action that resulted in the capture of Sukarno, Fatmawati and the children were entrusted to Bishop Albertus Soegijapranata at the Bintaran Church in Yogyakarta.

=== Childhood in Jakarta ===
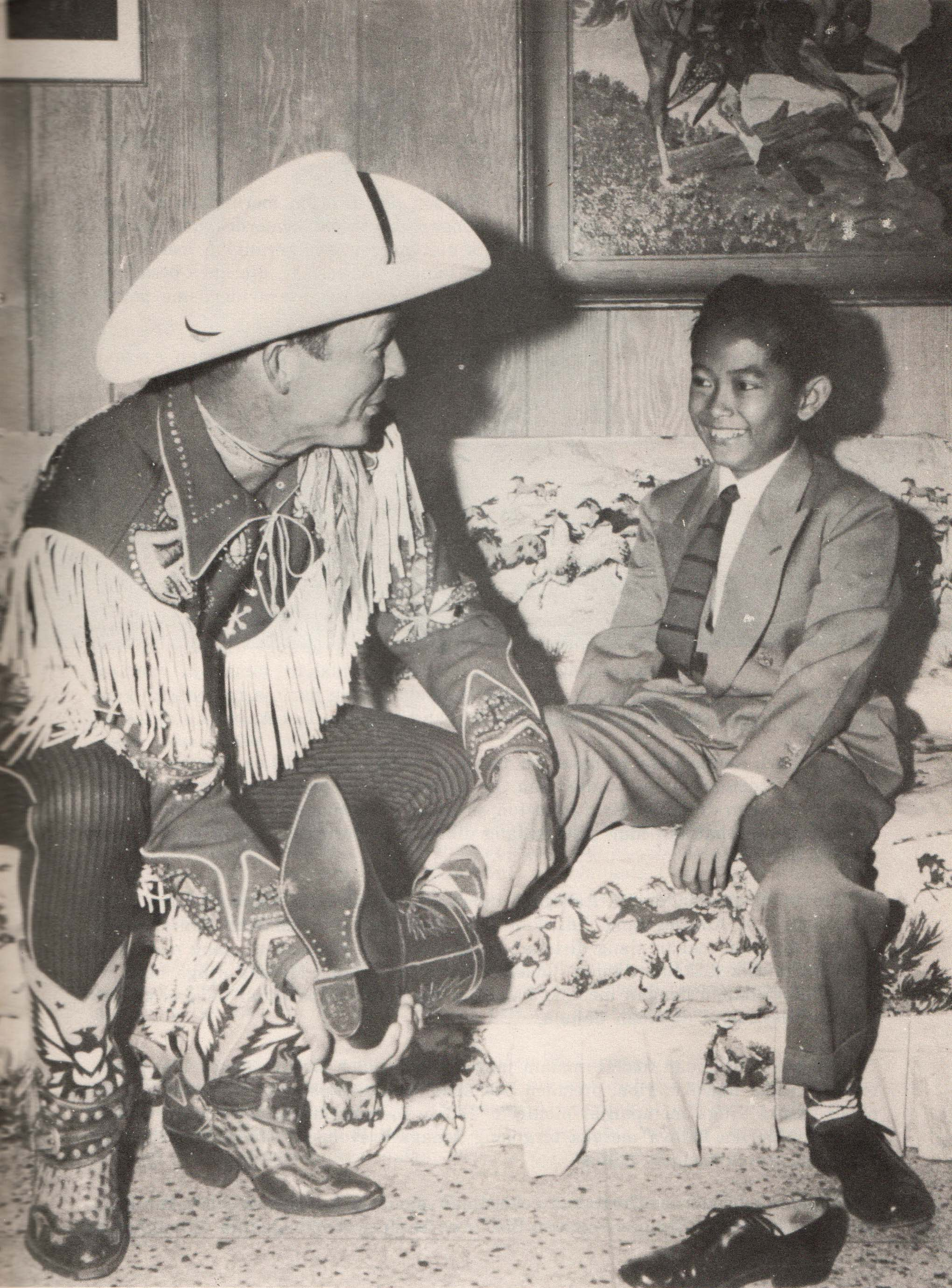
Guntur with Roy Rogers during a state visit to the United States, 1956

On 27 December 1949, the Dutch formally recognized Indonesian independence. Sukarno and Fatmawati returned to Jakarta, where they had three more children: Rachmawati (b. 1950), Sukmawati (b. 1951), and Guruh (b. 1953). Two days after Guruh's birth, Sukarno asked Fatmawati permission to take his mistress, Hartini, as a second wife under Islamic law. Though reluctant, Fatmawati agreed.

Ultimately, Fatmawati left the palace in Jakarta in December 1955. Guntur went with her, while the other children remained with Sukarno. Guntur was critical of Sukarno's decision to take a second wife, even after Sukarno promised that Hartini would never replace Fatmawati as First Lady of Indonesia. When Sukarno continued to take more wives, Guntur refused to deal with them. Speaking to Cindy Adams in the 1960s, Sukarno described Guntur as "a mother's child".

Nonetheless, Guntur retained a relationship with his father. He took up photography in 1956, when Sukarno gave him a camera as a reward for completing a year's schooling. He took to photography rapidly, capturing Sukarno's meetings with world leaders, family moments, and interactions with citizens. That year, he accompanied Sukarno during a state visit to the United States. During their tour, father and son attended Disneyland; their tour also included stops in Washington, D.C., and Detroit.

On 30 November 1957, Guntur and Megawati avoided an assassination attempt on Sukarno when he visited their school in Cikini. Having accompanied Sukarno during a school ceremony, they re-entered the building to watch a film while their father left through the front yard. Several hand grenades were thrown at Sukarno, and although he escaped without injury, the attack resulted in dozens of casualties. The children did not learn of Sukarno's escape until after his return home.

Guntur and Megawati attended a meeting of non-aligned states in Belgrade, Yugoslavia (now Serbia), in 1961, with Sukarno. In 1962, Guntur enrolled at the Bandung Institute of Technology (ITB), taking the engineering programme as his father had. He was a student activist with the Indonesian National Student Movement, and joined the band Aneka Nada (lit. 'Varied Tones').

=== Transition period ===
In 1965, a failed coup attempt was undertaken by a group calling itself the 30 September Movement (Gerakan 30 September, or G30S). This attempt was blamed on the Communist Party of Indonesia (PKI), and suspected communists and communist sympathizers were hunted during a multi-year purge. In the aftermath, as Sukarno was overthrown by Suharto, Guntur left his university studies. Contemporary reports indicated that he had been expelled as a communist sympathiser, and he was reported later that year to have been arrested, though the latter was denied by the Indonesian military. Still angered by Sukarno's decision to marry Hartini, he was initially reluctant to visit his father during his house arrest. Over time, they reconciled, and Guntur became more willing to deal with Hartini in the face of his father's declining health.

In February 1970, Guntur married Henny Emilia Handayani, whom he had met when they were both students at ITB. As Sukarno was unable to attend, both due to his failing health and because the Suharto regime prohibited it, Guntur reached out to former vice-president Mohammad Hatta and asked him to be his wali (representative) at the wedding. Initially expecting to be refused, as Hatta and Sukarno had fallen out, Guntur was surprised when Hatta accepted. Guntur and Henny had one daughter, Puti Guntur Soekarno, born in 1971.

=== Subsequent activities ===
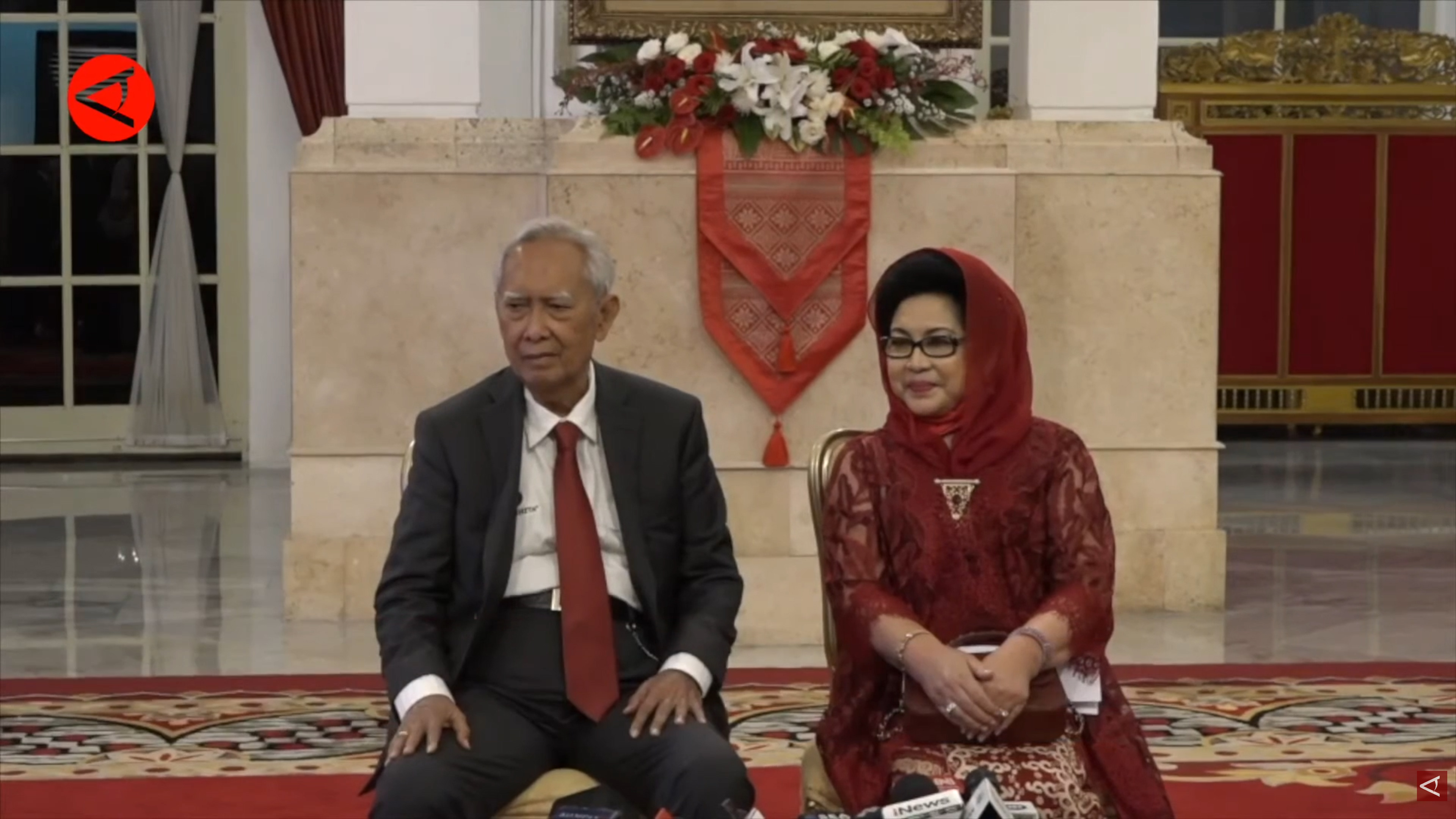
Guntur and Henny at the Merdeka Palace, 2022

After Sukarno's death in June 1970, Guntur was expected to continue his father's legacy in the political sphere. He physically resembled Sukarno and had expansive political knowledge, having regularly discussed contemporary political issues—including the Non-Aligned Movement and Indonesia's claims over West New Guinea—with Sukarno. In the 1971 legislative election, he was reported to be running as a candidate for his father's Indonesian National Party. Although the party desired Guntur as a candidate, and he delivered a speech supporting the party in May, he ultimately did not run.

Instead, Guntur focused on earning an income for his family. With two partners, he established the construction company PT Dela Rohita in 1973. By 1993, the company, headquartered in Kebayoran Baru, Jakarta, and with a branch in Bandung, had expanded into oil well drilling and geological surveys. In his spare time, he continued to play music, take photographs, and garden. In 1977, during a period of increased interest in Sukarno, Guntur published a memoir titled Bung Karno, Bapakku, Kawanku, Guruku (Bung Karno: My Father, My Friend, My Teacher). Guntur held his first photography exhibition in November 1994.

In March 1999, Tempo magazine reported that the Indonesian Democratic Party of Struggle was considering Guntur for the upcoming presidential election, though ultimately Megawati was nominated. In 2006, he told Koran Tempo that practical politics was too tiring. Later that decade, Guntur's daughter Puti entered politics with a successful campaign to represent the West Java X constituency in the House of Representatives. Although he was initially against her involvement in politics, he ultimately endorsed her decision to contest the East Javan gubernatorial election in 2022. Due to his general avoidance of politics, the magazine Tempo likened it to "coming down the mountain". He has remained the only one of Sukarno's children with Fatmawati to mostly avoid practical politics.

Guntur endorsed Ganjar Pranowo in the 2024 general election over his niece, Puan Maharani. In 2024, Guntur urged the Indonesian government to repeal MPRS Decree No. XXXIII/MPRS/1967, which had been issued in 1967 to formally remove Sukarno from the presidency citing charges of treason and support for the PKI. The decree was repealed that year, which Guntur considered to rehabilitate Sukarno's reputation. In June 2025, as part of a fundraiser at the National Gallery of Indonesia commemorating the anniversary of Sukarno's birth, Guntur exhibited 550 photographs he had taken. This exhibition featured portraits of former presidents Sukarno and Suharto, former vice-president Mohammad Hatta, former first lady Siti Hartinah, as well as individuals in their everyday activities.

== Works cited ==
- "Arrest of Sukarno's Son Denied by Army". The Florida Times-Union. Jacksonville, Florida. 28 August 1966. p. F18.
- ATG (18 December 1993). "Mereka Ahli Waris Nama Besar" [They Are Heirs to a Great Name]. Tempo. Vol. 23, no. 42. p. 25.
- "Diam Guntur Soekarnoputra" [Guntur Soekarnoputra's Silence]. Tempo. Vol. 27, no. 22. 8 March 1999. p. 88.
- Garjito, Dany; Opita, Elvariza (17 January 2023). "Geger Guntur Soekarnoputra Pilih Ganjar dan Capres Tak Harus Trah Soekarno, Ternyata Buat Tekan Megawati?" [Controversy over Guntur Soekarnoputra Endorsing Ganjar, Presidential Candidate Need Not Be Sukarno's Family, All to Pressure Megawati?]. Suara Merdeka. Archived from the original on 23 August 2026.
- Hanna, Willard A. (17 August 2026). "Sukarno". Encyclopedia Britannica. Archived from the original on 23 August 2026.
- Harahap, M. Hilal Eka Saputra (6 December 2024). "Profil Singkat Putra-putri Presiden Soekarno" [Brief Profiles of the Sons and Daughters of President Soekarno]. Antara. Archived from the original on 23 August 2026.
- "Indonesians Recall Disgraced Hero Sukarno". Laredo Morning Times. Laredo, Texas. 9 November 1978. p. 12A.
- Janti, Nur (9 November 2017). "Guntur Soekarnoputra Menikah Tanpa Ayah" [Guntur Soekarnoputra Married Without His Father]. Historia.id. Archived from the original on 22 August 2026.
- Kakiailatu, Toeti (17 March 2002). "Di Sana, Srihani Berjumpa dengan Srihana" [There, Srihani Met with Srihana]. Tempo (in Indonesian). Vol. 31, no. 3. Jakarta. p. 104.
- Kurnia, Amalia Nurhidayah (18 September 2025). "Ernest Dezentjé, Pelukis Bogor yang Jadi Sahabat Dekat Bung Karno" [Ernest Dezentjé, the Bogor Painter who Was a Close Friend of Bung Karno]. Viva News (in Indonesian). Archived from the original on 26 July 2026.
- Legge, John D. (1972). Sukarno: A Political Biography. London: Penguin Books. ISBN 978-0-7139-0244-0.
- McIntyre, Angus (2005). The Indonesian Presidency: The Shift from Personal Toward Constitutional Rule. Lanham: Rowman & Littlefield. ISBN 978-1-4616-0465-5.
- "Mereka Berseru 'Bravo Bimbo'" [They Call 'Bravo Bimbo']. Tempo. Vol. 2, no. 43. 6 January 1973. p. 26.
- Muhid, Hendrik Khoirul (25 October 2023). "Kiprah Anak-anak Presiden di Dunia Politik dari Sukarno Hingga Jokowi" [Political Contributions of Presidents' Children, from Sukarno to Jokowi]. Tempo (in Indonesian). Archived from the original on 22 August 2026.
- "Mevrouw F. Soekarno wil Scheiden" [Mrs. F. Soekarno Seeks a Divorce]. De Nieuwsgier (in Dutch). Jakarta. 30 December 1955. p. 1.
- Nugroho, Arifin Suryo (2009). Srihana–Srihani: Biografi Hartini Sukarno [Srihana–Srihani: A Biography of Hartini Sukarno] (in Indonesian). Yogyakarta: Ombak. ISBN 978-602-8335-13-3.
- Paat, Yustinus (9 September 2024). "Family Calls for Rehabilitation of Founding Father Soekarno's Legacy After Treason Allegations". The Jakarta Globe. Archived from the original on 23 August 2026.
- "People in the News". The Index-Journal. Greenwood, South Carolina. 21 May 1971. p. 7.
- "Puti Guntur Soekarno". Viva (in Indonesian). Archived from the original on 23 August 2026.
- Rimadi, Luqman (16 August 2017). "Pelarian Rengasdengklok dan Susu Guntur Sukarno yang Tertinggal" [The Rengasdengklok Incident and Guntur Sukarno's Forgotten Milk]. Liputan6 (in Indonesian). Archived from the original on 23 August 2026.
- Roosa, John (2006). Pretext for Mass Murder: The September 30th Movement and Suharto's Coup D'état in Indonesia. Madison: University of Wisconsin Press. ISBN 978-0-299-22030-3.
- "Saat Guntur Soekarnoputra Turun Gunung di Pilgub Jatim 2018" [When Guntur Soekarnoputra Came down the Mountain in the 2018 East Javan Gubernatorial Elections]. Tempo. 11 May 2018. Archived from the original on 22 August 2026.
- SDA, Eiben Heizier I (10 November 2022). "Profil Guntur Soekarnoputra, Putra Sulung Bung Karno yang Ucapkan Terima Kasih Kepada Jokowi" [Profile of Guntur Soekarnoputra, the Eldest Son of Bung Karno who Expressed Gratitude to Jokowi]. Tempo. Archived from the original on 22 August 2026.
- Sukarno; Adams, Cindy (1966). Sukarno; An Autobiography. Hong Kong: Gunung Agung. OCLC 2159630.
- "Sukarno's Son Expelled". Reading Evening Post. Reading, Berkshire. 24 September 1966. p. 5.
- Sulistianti, Rani (11 January 2026). "Mohammad Guntur Soekarnoputra". Inilah.com (in Indonesian). Archived from the original on 22 August 2026.
- Presiden Republik Indonesia [Presidents of the Republic of Indonesia] (in Indonesian). Jakarta: Ministry of Education and Culture. 2014. ISBN 978-602-282-733-7.
- Yolan (7 June 2021). "Momen Hari Lahir Bung Karno, Guntur Launching Edisi 3 Buku 'Bapakku, Kawanku, Guruku'" [Commemorating the Anniversary of Bung Karno, Guntur Launches 3rd Edition of His Book 'Bapakku, Kawanku, Guruku'] (in Indonesian). PDI-Perjuangan. Archived from the original on 23 August 2026.
- Yuliastuti, Dian (4 June 2025). "Guntur Soekarnoputra Pamerkan Foto Sukarno hingga Liem Sioe Liong" [Guntur Soekarnoputra Exhibits Photographs from Sukarno to Liem Sioe Liong]. Tempo (in Indonesian). Archived from the original on 22 August 2026.
- Zulkifli, Arif; Hidayat, Bagja; Maksum, Dwidjo U., eds. (2010). Sukarno: Paradoks Revolusi Indonesia [Sukarno: The Paradox of the Indonesian Revolution]. Seri Buku Tempo. Jakarta: Kepustakaan Populer Gramedia. ISBN 978-979-91-0266-9.
