= Saifullah Yusuf =

Indonesian politician

Gus Saifullah Yusuf
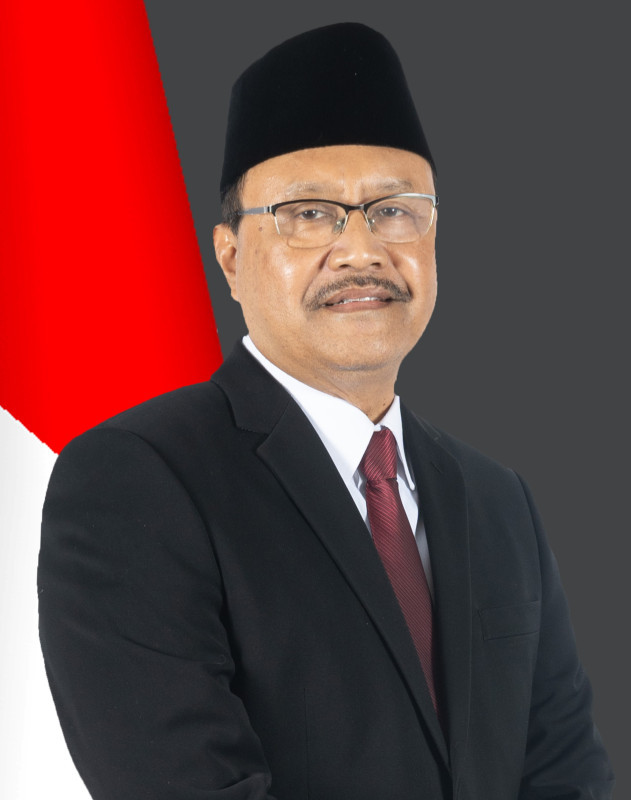

32nd Minister of Social Affairs
- Incumbent
- Assumed office 11 September 2024
- President: Joko Widodo; Prabowo Subianto
- Preceded by: Tri Rismaharini

19th Mayor of Pasuruan
- In office 26 February 2021 – 11 September 2024
- President: Joko Widodo
- Governor: Khofifah Indar Parawansa
- Preceded by: Raharto Teno Prasetyo
- Succeeded by: Adi Wibowo

Vice Governor of East Java
- In office 12 February 2009 – 12 February 2019
- President: Susilo Bambang Yudhoyono; Joko Widodo
- Governor: Soekarwo
- Preceded by: Soenarjo
- Succeeded by: Emil Dardak

State Minister for the Accelaration of Development of Disadvantaged Regions
- In office 21 October 2004 – 9 May 2007
- President: Susilo Bambang Yudhoyono
- Preceded by: Manuel Kaisiepo
- Succeeded by: Muhammad Lukman Edy

Personal details
- Born: 28 August 1964 (age 62) Pasuruan, East Java, Indonesia
- Party: PKB (since 2000)
- Other political affiliations: PDI-P (1999–2000)
- Spouse: Fatma Saifullah Yusuf
- Relations: Salahuddin Wahid (uncle)
- Children: Selma Halida; M. Rayhan Hibatullah; M. Falihuddin Daffa; M. Farelino Ramadhan

H. Saifullah Yusuf (born 28 August 1964), better known by his nickname Gus Ipul, is an Indonesian politician who currently serves as the Minister of Social Affairs under Joko Widodo administration, replacing Tri Rismaharini due to her resignation. He also previously held several government offices, such as the Mayor of Pasuruan, former Vice Governor of East Java, and former Minister of Villages, Development of Disadvantaged Regions, and Transmigration under Susilo Bambang Yudhoyono administration.

== Education ==
Gus Ipul holds a master's degree in Social and Politics Study Faculty from National University in Jakarta.

== Career ==
=== Early career ===
Gus Ipul started his political career through GP Ansor, the youth wing of Nahdlatul Ulama. He served as the chief of GP Ansor for two terms, from 2000–2005 and 2005–2010. Prior to this, he was acting chief of GP Ansor, replacing Iqbal Assegaf, who had died on 1999. After finishing his tenure as chief of GP Ansor, he was elected as one of Nahdlatul Ulama leaders under the leadership of KH. Said Aqil Siraj.

=== Member of Parliament ===
Gus Ipul was elected as member of House of Representatives during the 1999 Indonesian legislative election, running as a candidate for PDI-P. His time in PDI-P serves as a symbol of the political alliance between Abdurrahman Wahid and Megawati Sukarnoputri as Gus Ipul was considered as Wahid's closest aide and being placed in PDI-P. As relations between Gus Dur and Megawati worsen on 2001, Gus Ipul resigned from the House of Representatives and left PDI-P while subsequently joined PKB.

During the PKB party congress, he was elected as secretary general of the party, an optimal position since he had competed with Alwi Shihab for the position of party chairman.

=== Minister of Development of Disadvantaged Regions ===
He was appointed Minister of Villages and Development of Disadvantaged Regions in the First United Indonesia Cabinet from October 2004 to May 2007. As a minister, he actively visited many disadvantaged regions. However he had a short tenure, as PKB suffered internal strife that lead up of him being fired from his position as secretary general, indirectly resulting in the loss of his position. As he is no longer considered as representative of PKB in the government, both of his position as secretary general of PKB and his ministerial position was succeeded by Lukman Edy.

=== Vice Governor ===
Gus Ipul participated the 2008 East Java gubernatorial election as the running mate of Soekarwo with their candidacy being supported by Democratic Party, Prosperous Justice Party, and National Mandate Party. The election was held in 2 rounds (first round on 23 July 2008 and second round on 4 November 2008) with another recount on Bangkalan Regency and Sampang Regency on 21 January 2009. The pair won 50,2% of all votes against Khofifah Indar Parawansa who won 49,8%. He assumed the office of Vice Governor of East Java on 12 February 2009, inaugurated by Minister of Home Affairs Mardiyanto.

Soekarwo once again called Gus Ipul as his running mate in the 2013 East Java gubernatorial election with a much broader support with Golkar and People's Conscience Party joined in endorsing the pair. Gus Ipul was previously being rumored to run against Soekarwo but ultimately choose to remain as his running mate on moral and political grounds. In the rematch election against Khofifah, the pair once again won the election this time with just 47,25% of the vote despite the increase in number of votes compared to 2008. They were then inaugurated on 12 February 2014 by Minister of Home Affairs Gamawan Fauzi and was attended by all regents and mayors of East Java, ministers of the Second United Indonesia Cabinet, other governors and public figures of East Java.

=== Gubernatorial candidate ===
After serving for 10 years as Vice Governor, Gus Ipul advances his candidacy for Governor of East Java for the 2018 East Java gubernatorial election. His candidacy was endorsed by PKB on 11 October 2018 and was accompanied by granddaughter of Sukarno, Puti Guntur Sukarno from PDI-P as his running mate. His candidacy was also supported by national opposition parties Gerindra and PKS. The pair stated that they intend to continue Soekarwo's programs. However, the pair was defeated by Khofifah Indar Parawansa and Emil Dardak.

=== Mayor of Pasuruan ===
Gus Ipul ran for mayor of Pasuruan in 2020 with Adi Wibowo as his running mate. The pair ran against the incumbent candidate, Raharto Teno Prasetyo. He won the election and appointed mayor from 2021 to 2024 and was inaugurated by Governor of East Java Khofifah Indar Parawansa.

=== Minister of Social Affairs ===
Having almost completed his term as mayor of Pasuruan, President Joko Widodo appointed Gus Ipul to replace Tri Rismaharini as Minister of Social Affairs on September 11, 2024 as she participate in the 2024 East Java gubernatorial election. He serve in his ministerial position through the remainder of Jokowi's term until his presidency was up on October 20, 2024, making Gus Ipul's term having less than a month short. He retained his position under the presidency of Prabowo Subianto, with Agus Jabo Priyono serving as his deputy minister in the new Red White Cabinet.
