= Puti Guntur Soekarno =

Indonesian politician (born 1971)

- Puti in 2013

Member of the House of Representatives of Indonesia
- Incumbent
- Assumed office 1 October 2019
- Constituency: East Java I
- In office 2009–2018
- Constituency: West Java X

Personal details
- Born: 26 June 1971 (age 55) Jakarta, Indonesia
- Party: PDI-P
- Spouse: Joy Kameron
- Parents: Guntur Soekarnoputra; Henny Hendayani

Puti Pramathana Puspa Seruni Paundrianagari Guntur Soekarno Putri (born 26 June 1971) professionally known as Puti Guntur Soekarno, is an Indonesian politician currently serving as a representative of East Java I Constituency since 2019. She is the granddaughter of Indonesia's first president Sukarno through her father, Guntur.

She has served several terms in the House of Representatives, representing the West Java X Constituency from 2009 to 2018. She was also the running mate of Saifullah Yusuf during the 2018 East Java gubernatorial election.

== Biography ==
=== Early life ===
Puti Pramathana Puspa Seruni Paundrianagari Guntur Soekarno Putri was born in Jakarta, Indonesia, on 26 June 1971, the only child of Guntur Soekarnoputra and his wife Henny Hendayani. Her paternal grandparents are Sukarno, the first president of Indonesia, and his wife Fatmawati. As a child, Puti had a close relationship with her grandmother, to whom she attributes her religious values. She read extensively and was involved in the arts, including dance performances, painting, and piano recitals.

Puti attended the Cikini School for her elementary studies, as her father had before her. She continued her junior and senior secondary studies at Budi Utomo schools in Jakarta. For her tertiary studies, Puti enrolled at the University of Indonesia. In 1994, she graduated with a degree in state administration. After graduating, Puti became involved in various cultural activities. She worked with her uncle Guruh Sukarnoputra through his performance group Swara Mahardhika, and was the deputy chairwoman of the Fatmawati Foundation.

=== Political activities ===
In 2009, Puti contested the Indonesian legislative election to represent the West Java X constituency as a member of the Indonesian Democratic Party of Struggle (PDI-P). At the time, several of her cousins were already involved in politics, including Puan Maharani and Prananda Prabowo. She was elected to the House of Representatives and became a member of Commission X, responsible for matters of education, culture, youths, sports, tourism, creative economy, and libraries. She was re-elected during the 2014 Indonesian legislative election.

In 2017, Puti was announced to be running for governor of West Java in the upcoming local elections, and several banners supporting her were reported. At the time, she was expected to be the PDI-P's only female candidate after two other likely candidates, Susi Pudjiastuti and Netty Prasetiyani, failed to attend a preliminary meeting. However, on 9 January 2018 Puti was instead made the running mate to Saifullah Yusuf in the East Javan gubernatorial election. The PDI-P's initial pick, Abdullah Azwar Anas, returned his mandate, and Saifullah spoke with the party's chairwoman, Puti's aunt Megawati Sukarnoputri, to seek a running mate. Puti learned of this change only after returning from a trip to Japan. On the campaign trail, Puti advocated for greater involvement of East Javan youths in the province's development, including a technology-based approach to gotong royong (mutual collaboration). Ultimately, Khofifah Indar Parawansa was elected.

Puti returned to the House of Representatives following the 2019 Indonesian general election, when she was elected to represent the East Java I constituency. The seat had previously been held by her uncle, Guruh. Upon election, she again sat on Commission X. Puti ran for re-election in the 2024 Indonesian general election, securing her seat with 108,181 votes; this was the largest number of votes received by a PDI-P candidate in the election. As of 2026, she is also the member of PDI-P's board responsible for the education portfolio.

== Personal life ==
Puti is married to Joy Kameron. They have two children, Rakyan Ratri Syandriasari Kameron and Rakyan Daanu Syahandra Kameron. Puti published a new edition of Guntur's memoir Bung Karno, Bapakku, Kawanku, Guruku ('Bung Karno: My Father, My Friend, My Teacher', 1977) in 2021. Speaking to attendees at the book launch, she recalled that, as a child, she had wanted a copy for herself. Rather than provide her with a free copy, her father had required her to save enough money to buy one, calling it a lesson in responsibility.

== Works cited ==
- Dipa, Arya (26 October 2017). "Soekarno's Granddaughter to Run for West Java Governor". The Jakarta Post. Archived from the original on 20 September 2026.
- Farisa, Fitria Chusna (19 March 2024). "Persaingan Cucu-Cicit Soekarno di Pileg 2024: 3 Lolos Senayan, 2 Terancam Gagal" [Sukarno's Grandchildren and Great-Grandchildren Contest the 2024 Election: 3 On to Senayan, 2 Likely Unsuccessful]. Kompas. Archived from the original on 20 September 2026.
- Firman, Muhammad (12 June 2025). "Profil Puti Guntur Soekarno, Cucu Presiden Soekarno di Komisi X DPR RI" [Profile of Puti Guntur Soekarno, President Soekarno's Granddaughter on Commission X]. Berita Satu. Archived from the original on 20 September 2026.
- Mardani (21 July 2018). "Kalah di Pilgub Jatim, Puti Guntur Nyaleg DPR dari Dapil Jatim I" [After Losing East Javan Gubernatorial Election, Puti Guntur to Contest Parliamentary Seat from East Java I]. Merdeka.com. Archived from the original on 21 September 2026.
- Prireza, Adam (19 January 2018). "Saat Puti Guntur Ingin Membumikan Ide Soekarno di Zaman Now" [When Puti Guntur Chose to Manifest Soekarno's Ideas in a Modern Spirit]. Tempo. Archived from the original on 21 September 2026.
- McIntyre, Angus (2005). The Indonesian Presidency: The Shift from Personal Toward Constitutional Rule. Lanham: Rowman & Littlefield. ISBN 978-1-4616-0465-5.
- "Puti Guntur, Putra Mahkota Trah Soekarno yang Tersembunyi" [Puti Guntur, the Hidden Crown Prince of the Soekarno Family]. Detik.com (in Indonesian). 24 December 2014. Archived from the original on 21 September 2026.
- "Puti Guntur Soekarno". Viva (in Indonesian). Archived from the original on 23 August 2026.
- Rinanda, Hilda Meilisa (31 December 2018). "Pilgub Jatim 2018: Akhirnya, Khofifah Menang" [East Javan Election 2018: Finally, Khofifah Has Won]. Detik.com (in Indonesian). Archived from the original on 20 September 2026.
- "Struktur DPP PDI Perjuangan" [Structure of the Party Council, Indonesian Democratic Party–Struggle] (in Indonesian). Archived from the original on 21 September 2026.
- Suhartono (8 June 2021). "Puti Guntur Soekarno dan Cinta Eyang Karno" [Puti Guntur Soekarno and the Love of Grandfather Sukarno]. Kompas (in Indonesian). Archived from the original on 20 September 2026.
