= Inggit Garnasih =

Wife of president Sukarno (1888–1984)

- Inggit in 1958
- Born: 17 February 1888; Bandung Regency, West Java, Dutch East Indies
- Died: 13 April 1984 (aged 96); Bandung, West Java, Indonesia
- Known for: Wife of Sukarno

Inggit Garnasih (17 February 1888 – 13 April 1984) was the second wife of Sukarno, who later became President of Indonesia. They met in 1921, when she and her husband Sanusi took Sukarno and his wife Siti Oetari as boarders. The two began an extramarital affair that culminated in them divorcing their spouses and marrying on 24 March 1923. Inggit provided emotional and financial support to Sukarno through his university studies and during his involvement in the nationalist movement, including the establishment of the Indonesian National Party in 1927 and Sukarno's exiles to Flores (1934–1938) and Bengkulu (1938–1942). She and Sukarno were unable to conceive, and in 1943 Sukarno divorced Inggit to marry Fatmawati. After the divorce, Inggit remained in Bandung until her death.

Inggit and her relationship with Sukarno have been the subject of several literary works, including a novel by Ramadhan K.H. and a dramatic monologue by Happy Salma. Her former home has been made a museum, and the government of West Java has nominated her for the title of National Hero of Indonesia.

== Biography ==
=== Early life ===
Inggit was born in Kamasan village in the Banjaran District of Bandung Regency, West Java, Dutch East Indies (now Indonesia) on 17 February 1888. She was the daughter of Ardjipan and his wife Amsi. She received a religious education in her youth.

Circa 1908, at the age of twenty, Inggit married a civil servant named Nataatmadja. By the mid-1910s, their marriage had ended in divorce. Inggit then married Hadji Sanusi, several years her elder. Sanusi was a prominent Muslim merchant involved in the Sarekat Islam (SI) movement, and Inggit was involved in several SI events; for instance, during the organization's national congress in 1916, Inggit was responsible for ensuring sufficient food and drink were provided. Through SI, Inggit and Sanusi were acquainted with many of the movement's leaders, including Agus Salim and Oemar Said Tjokroaminoto.

=== Relationship with Sukarno ===
In June 1921, Inggit and Sanusi welcomed to their home Sukarno, a young student of Tjokroaminoto's who was moving to Bandung for university. At the time, Sukarno was married to Siti Oetari, Tjokroaminoto's daughter, and she later joined him. Theirs was a "hung" marriage (kawin gantung), i.e., left unconsummated, and according to the historian Mulyono Atmosiswartoputra Sukarno viewed Oetari as more of a sister. As such, according to the biographer John D. Legge, "it was inevitable" that Inggit's beauty resulted in Sukarno yearning for his landlord's wife, who was more than ten years his elder. Sukarno later narrated: "All the sparks that can shoot out from a callow inexperienced boy of 20 to a matured, experienced woman in her 30's did. The first moment I stepped through that doorway, I thought, 'Oh, what an exquisite woman.'"

As Sukarno and Oetari boarded at the home, Inggit served him meals and cleaned his room. Over time, their attraction became mutual; according to Sukarno, Inggit felt neglected by her husband, whom he characterized as a gambler addicted to billiards, and they sought comfort in an extramarital affair. Although Inggit counselled him to improve his relationship with Oetari, he refused. In 1922 Sukarno decided to divorce Siti Oetari through repudiation (talak tiga) and brought her back to her family in Surabaya. Sanusi similarly agreed to divorce Inggit. Inggit and Sukarno were married on 24 March 1923.

As his wife, Inggit accompanied Sukarno during numerous meetings and discussions, and provided emotional support. When he considered dropping out of university, she emphasized the importance of continuing his education, and she helped fund his continued studies. In a 1969 interview, she recalled that, although Sukarno had been a gifted public speaker, in small groups he was reticent to begin conversations; as such, she stimulated conversations that enabled him to socialize more easily. According to Reiza D. Dienaputra of Padjadjaran University, Inggit provided Sukarno with the positive energy he needed to complete his studies and, later, help establish the Indonesian National Party. Inggit provided financial support as Sukarno's political ambitions increased, making and selling jamu (traditional medicine and cosmetics) for supplemental income.

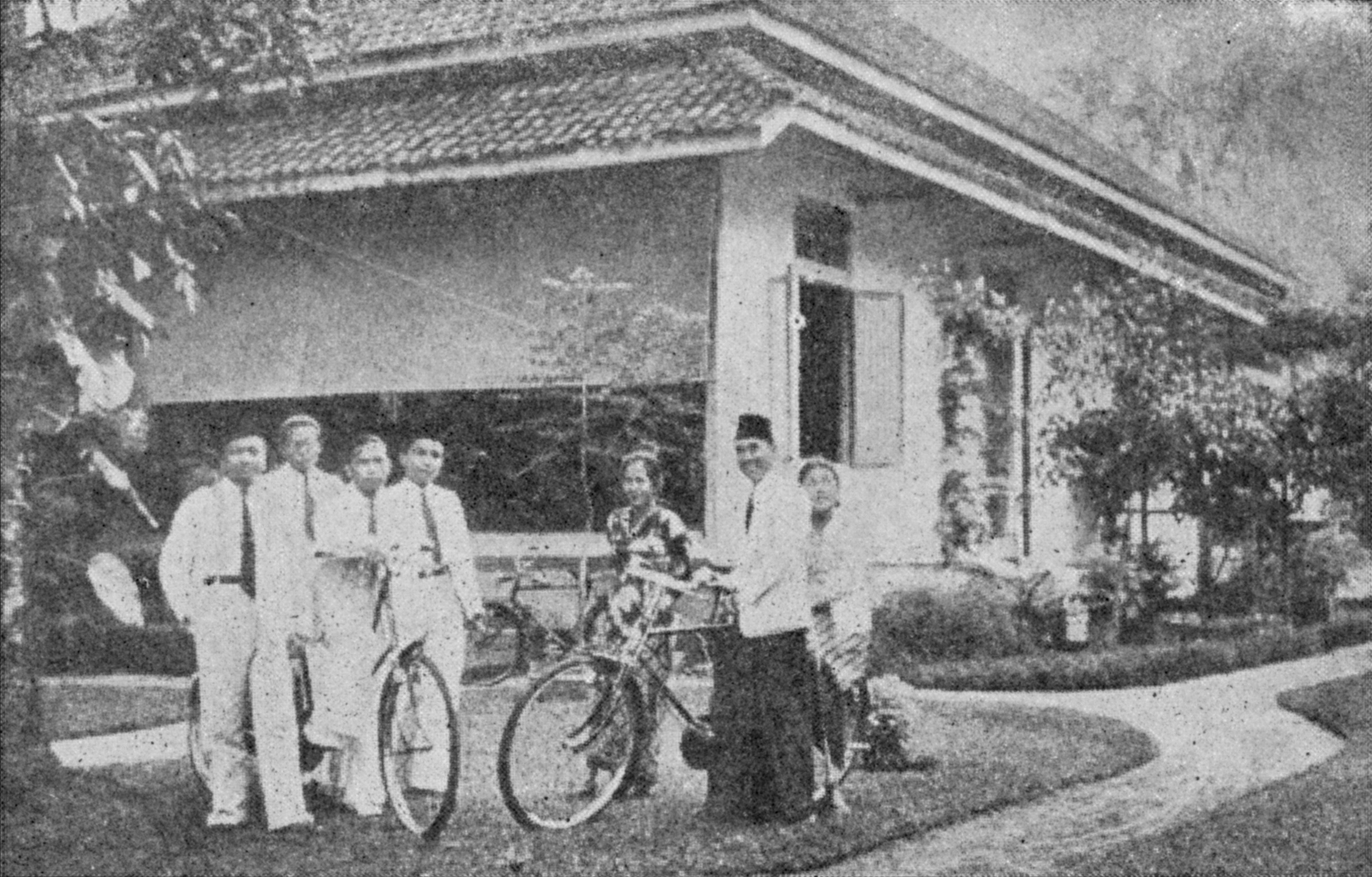
Sukarno (centre) in Bengkulu; Inggit is to his right

In 1929, Sukarno was arrested by the Dutch colonial regime and held at Banceuy Prison. Inggit did not have communication with her husband for forty days, and when he was moved to Sukamiskin Prison in June 1930 she was only allowed to visit him twice a month. Sukarno recalled that, to communicate messages about the state of the nationalist movement, Inggit would use egg shells. If the shell were pierced once, all was well; twice, an ally had been detained; thrice, all of the leaders had been arrested. More specific details would be encoded through a series of pricks in a Quran.

In 1934, Sukarno was exiled to the town of Ende on the island of Flores, accompanied by Inggit, her mother, and her niece Ratna Djuami, whom they had adopted. Inggit's mother died in Ende, and Inggit sold much of her family's belongings. In 1938, Sukarno was transferred to Bengkulu in Sumatra, again with Inggit by his side. In Bengkulu, Sukarno began a close relationship with Fatmawati, the daughter of a local Muhammadiyah leader. He asked Inggit for permission to take Fatmawati as a second wife under Islamic law, citing the fact that their marriage had yet to produce any children. Although Inggit refused, Sukarno continued his relationship with Fatmawati.

=== Later life ===
During the Japanese occupation of the Dutch East Indies, which began in 1942, Sukarno and Inggit were removed from Bengkulu and sent back to Java. Their relationship already stressed, on 29 January 1943 the couple divorced. Sukarno took Fatmawati as his third wife, marrying her by proxy before arranging for her to travel from Bengkulu to Jakarta. Inggit, meanwhile, remained in Bandung. During the razing of Bandung by Indonesian revolutionaries in March 1946, Inggit fled the city, though she returned later. She remained friendly with Sukarno until his death.

Inggit's tomb in Bandung

Inggit became sickly in late 1982, when she was diagnosed with organic brain syndrome at Hasan Sadikin Hospital. She died on 13 April 1984 at her home. Although she had been offered a spot at the Cikutra Heroes Cemetery before her death, Inggit refused, and these wishes were echoed by her family. She was buried at Babakan Ciparay Cemetery, South Bandung, with military honours. Attendees included Sukarno's children by Fatmawati Megawati, Rachmawati, and Guruh, and his widow Hartini.

== Legacy ==
Inggit's home on Cilentah Street was made into a museum; the road was also renamed after her. As of 2026, the government of West Java has unsuccessfully nominated Inggit as a National Hero of Indonesia four times, citing her contributions to the nationalist movement and continued support of Sukarno in exile. In 2023, Governor of West Java Ridwan Kamil inaugurated the Inggit Garnasih Clinic in Bandung, the first of a planned sixteen new facilities dedicated to elder care in the province.

The Indonesian novelist Ramadhan K.H. used the story of Inggit and Sukarno as the basis of his historical novel Kuantar ke Gerbang: Kisah Cinta Ibu Inggit dengan Bung Karno ('I'll Take You to the Gate: The Love Story of Inggit and Karno', 1988). The actress Happy Salma developed a dramatic monologue based on the novel, first performed in 2012. She also staged a musical performance based on Inggit's life in 2022, titled Inggit Garnasih, Tegak Setelah Ombak ('Inggit Garnasih, Firm Despite Waves'). In Hanung Bramantyo's 2013 biopic of Sukarno, Inggit was portrayed by the actress Maudy Koesnaedi; she reprised the role for a series of stage performances in 2021.

== Works cited ==
- Dienaputra, Reiza D. (22 June 2026). "Memperjuangkan Inggit Garnasih" [Fighting for Inggit Garnasih]. Pikiran Rakyat (in Indonesian). Archived from the original on 20 October 2026.
- "Inggit Garnasih, Sosok di Balik Suksesnya Bung Karno" [Inggit Garnasih, The Person Behind Bung Karno's Success]. Kompas (in Indonesian). 5 June 2012. Archived from the original on 20 October 2026.
- Legge, John D. (1972). Sukarno: A Political Biography. London: Penguin Books. ISBN 978-0-7139-0244-0.
- "Meninggal Dunia" [Died]. Tempo (in Indonesian). Vol. 14, no. 8. 21 April 1984. p. 17.
- Mulia, Prima (20 July 2023). "Ridwan Kamil Resmikan Klinik Ramah Lansia Inggit Garnasih" [Ridwan Kamil Inaugurates the Inggit Garnasih Elder Care Clinic]. Tempo (in Indonesian). Archived from the original on 20 October 2026.
- Nugraheni, Naomy A. (25 May 2022). "Mengenal Inggit Garnasih, 20 Tahun Bersama Soekarno dalam Suka dan Duka" [Introducing Inggit Garnasih, 20 Years with Sukarno in Joy and Sorrow]. Tempo (in Indonesian). Archived from the original on 20 October 2026.
- Suhendra, Ichsan (5 June 2021). "Cerita Maudy Koesnadi Kembali Perankan Istri Soekarno" [The Story of How Maudy Koesnadi Returned to Play Sukarno's Wife]. Viva (in Indonesian). Archived from the original on 20 October 2026.
- Sukarno; Adams, Cindy (1966). Sukarno; An Autobiography. Hong Kong: Gunung Agung. OCLC 2159630.
- Suwirta, Andi (2009). "Inggit Garnasih, Soekarno and the Age of Motion in Indonesia". Tawarikh: International Journal for Historical Studies. 1 (1): 71–82.
- Yasmin, Putri (25 September 2020). "Sosok Inggit Garnasih, Perempuan yang Surat Cerainya dengan Soekarno Viral" [On Inggit Garnaasih, the Woman Whose Divorce Certificate with Sukarno Went Viral]. Detik.com (in Indonesian). Archived from the original on 20 October 2026.
- "Sukarno's First [sic] Wife Buried". The Dispatch. Moline, Illinois. 15 April 1984. p. 3.
