= 2018 East Java gubernatorial election =

Local election in Indonesia

- 27 June 2018
- Turnout: 66.9%
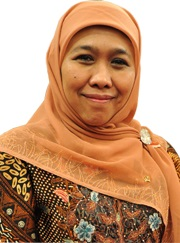

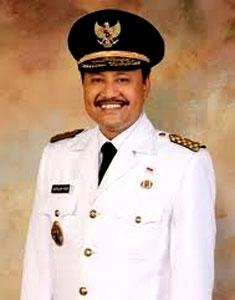
Nominee	Khofifah Indar Parawansa	Saifullah Yusuf
Party	PKB	PKB
Running mate	Emil Dardak	Puti Guntur Soekarno
Popular vote	10,465,218	9,076,014
Percentage	53.55%	46.45%
Nominators	Demokrat
- Results by city and regency
Governor before election
Soekarwo
Demokrat
Elected Governor
Khofifah Indar Parawansa
PKB

The 2018 East Java gubernatorial election took place on 27 June 2018 as part of the simultaneous local elections. It was held to elect the governor of East Java along with their deputy, whilst members of the provincial council (Dewan Perwakilan Rakyat Daerah) will be re-elected in 2019.

Incumbent Soekarwo was barred from participating in the re-elections after having served two full terms. Candidates were former cabinet minister Khofifah Indar Parawansa and sitting vice governor Saifullah Yusuf. The former won the election, securing over 53% of the votes.

== Timeline ==
On September 10, the General Elections Commission declared a voter count of 30,963,078 in the province who are to vote in 68,511 polling stations.

Registration for party-backed candidates were opened between 8 and 10 January 2018, while independent candidates were required to register between 22 and 26 November 2017. The campaigning period would commence between 15 February and 24 June, with a three-day election silence before voting on 27 June.

A televised debate between the two pairs was held on 10 April 2018.

== Candidates ==
Under regulations, candidates are required to secure the support of a political party or a coalition thereof comprising at least 20 seats in the regional house. Alternatively, independent candidates may run provided they are capable of securing support from 6.5 percent of the total voter population (2,012,601) in form of photocopied ID cards subject to verification by the local committee although no candidates expressing interest managed to do this.

#	Candidate	Most recent position	Running mate	Parties
1	Khofifah Indar Parawansa	Minister of Social Affairs (2014–18)	Emil Dardak	Demokrat (13 seats); Golkar (11 seats); PAN (7 seats); PPP (5 seats); Nasdem (4 seats); Hanura (2 seats) Total 42 seats
2	Saifullah Yusuf	Vice Governor of East Java (2009–now)	Puti Guntur Sukarno	PKB (20 seats); PDI-P (19 seats); Gerindra (13 seats); PKS (6 seats) Total 58 seats

The Khofifah–Emil pair was first endorsed by Demokrat on 21 November 2017, and Golkar followed suit on the 22nd. Hanura declared their support on December the same year, while the other parties joined the coalition in January 2018. Khofifah had been the Minister of Social Affairs in Joko Widodo's working cabinet, although she resigned from that post in order to run. Her running mate Emil Dardak is a Japan-educated doctoral graduate who serves as regent of Trenggalek Regency, although he has not resigned from the post. Minister of Home Affairs Tjahjo Kumolo had requested for him to step down for ethical reasons, but he admitted that there are no binding regulations requiring him to do so. The pair have stated that their program will involve women's empowerment, involving the reduction of maternal mortality in addition to skill trainings and economic aid for females.

Saifullah, popularly referred to as Gus Ipul, had served as the vice governor of the province since 2009. PKB, itself having enough seats to run a candidate with no coalition, put him forth as their gubernatorial candidate on 5 October 2017. PDI-P joined the coalition, initially putting forth Banyuwangi regent Abdullah Azwar Anas as running mate until he stepped back following a scandal. The party later appointed Sukarno's granddaughter and two-term member of the People's Representative Council Puti Guntur Sukarnoputri to replace him in the ticket. Despite initially planning to run a ticket alongside PAN, opposition parties Gerindra and PKS declared their support for Ipul-Puti on 10 January 2018. The pair have stated an intention to continue with Soekarwo's programs.

== Polling ==
=== After formal nominations ===
Pollster	Date	Sample size	Khofifah Indar Parawansa	Saifullah Yusuf
Poltracking	18–22 June 2018	1,200	51.8	43.5
Litbang Kompas	10–15 May 2018	800	48.6	45.6
Surabaya Survey Center	11–19 April 2018	1,220	22.3	22.0
Poltracking	6–11 March 2018	1,200	42.4	35.8
Charta Politika	3–8 March 2018	1,200	38.1	44.8
Litbang Kompas	19 February - 4 March 2018	800	44.5	44.0
Polmark	6–11 February 2018	1,200	27.2	42.7
KedaiKOPI	2–8 February 2018	600	46.3	53.7
Indo Barometer	29 January-4 February 2018	800	40.8	46.6

=== Before nominations ===
Pollster	Date	Sample size	Results
Surabaya Survey Center	25 November - 8 December 2017	940	SY (36.2%), KIP (33.9%)
LJSI	28 September - 8 October 2017	1,816	La Nyalla Matalitti (28.2%), SY (21.7%), TR (15.8%), KIP (14.1%)
Indo Barometer	18–29 September 2017	1,200	SY (41.0%), TR (18.4%), KIP (16.7%), AAA (3.4%)
Alvara Research Center	August 2017	1,200	SY (32.4%), KIP (27.7%), TR (16.1%), AAA (4.2%), Hasan Aminuddin (3.3%), Djarot Saiful Hidayat (2.3%)
The Initiative Institute	15–30 June 2017	1,140	SY (44.6%), KIP (37.3%), TR (18.1%)
Surabaya Survey Center	10–30 June 2017	800	SY (26.3%), TR (22.1%), KIR (13.9%), AAA (3.5%)
Poltracking	19–25 May 2017	800	SY (32.29%), TR (27.08%), KIP (19.11%), Abdullah Azwar Anas (8.47%)
The Initiative Institute	13–19 April 2017	956	Saifullah Yusuf (33.17%), Khofifah Indar Parawansa (28.31%), Tri Rismaharini (26.13%), Said Abdullah (3.85%), Agus Harimurti Yudhoyono (3.69%)

== Results ==
=== Quick count ===
Pollster	Khofifah-Emil	Saifulah-Puti
Indikator	53.63	46.37
Litbang Kompas	53.36	46.64
LSI	54.3	45.7
SMRC	52.28	47.72
