= Lukmanul Khakim =

Indonesian politician (born 1983)

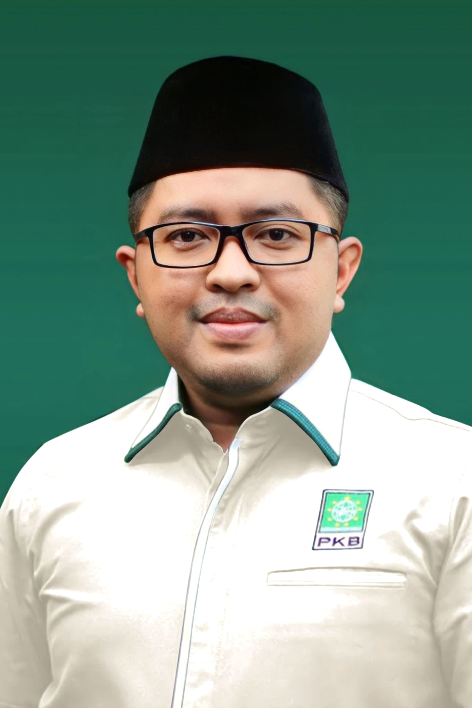
- Lukmanul Khakim in 2023

Member of the House of Representatives
- In office 1 October 2014 – 1 October 2019
- Constituency: East Java IX

Personal details
- Born: 8 January 1983 (age 43)
- Party: National Awakening Party

Lukmanul Khakim (born 8 January 1983) is an Indonesian politician. From 2014 to 2019, he was a member of the House of Representatives. In the 2024 East Java gubernatorial election, he was a candidate for vice governor of East Java.
