= Emil Dardak =

Indonesian politician (born 1984)

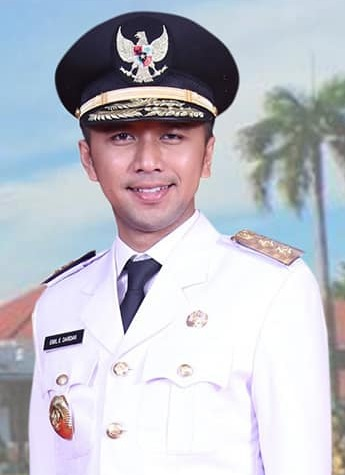
- Official portrait, 2019

5th Vice Governor of East Java
- Incumbent
- Assumed office 20 February 2025
- Governor: Khofifah Indar Parawansa
- Preceded by: Himself
- In office 13 February 2019 – 13 February 2024
- Governor: Khofifah Indar Parawansa
- Preceded by: Saifullah Yusuf
- Succeeded by: Himself

16th Regent of Trenggalek
- In office 17 February 2016 – 13 February 2019
- Preceded by: Mulyadi W.R.
- Succeeded by: Muhammad Nur Arifin

Personal details
- Born: 20 May 1984 (age 42) Jakarta, Indonesia
- Party: Democratic (2018–present)
- Other political affiliations: KIM Plus (2024–present); PDI-P (2015–2017); Independent (2017–2018)
- Spouse: Arumi Bachsin
- Education: Raffles Institution
- Alma mater: University of New South Wales (BBus); Ritsumeikan Asia Pacific University (MSc), (PhD); St Anne's College, Oxford (MSc)

Emil Elestianto Dardak (born 20 May 1984) is an Indonesian politician who is the Vice Governor of East Java. Before becoming Vice Governor, he was the regent of Trenggalek Regency from 2016 to 2019 and was a singer cum actor prior to his political career.

== Early life and education ==
Emil Dardak was born in Jakarta on 20 May 1984 as the eldest children of four siblings to an ethnic Javanese family hailing from Trenggalek, East Java province. Dardak studied at Singapore's Raffles Institution and later for his undergraduate degree at the University of New South Wales and he eventually completed his formal education after graduating with a doctorate from Ritsumeikan Asia Pacific University. In addition, Dardak participated in the 2018 class of the Bloomberg Harvard City Leadership Initiative, being the only Indonesian between the 40 mayors involved. In 2016, Dardak matriculated to St Anne's College, Oxford to read program management.

== Business career ==
From 2001 to 2003, Dardak was a World Bank Officer in Jakarta, and serving as a Media Analysis Consultant at Ogilvy. By 2012, Dardak had been appointed as executive vice president of the state-owned company PT Penjaminan Infrastruktur Indonesia.

== Political career ==
=== Regent of Trenggalek ===
Dardak registered in 2015 to run in Trenggalek's regency election with the 25-year old Muhammad Nur Arifin as running mate, with the support of PDI-P, Gerindra, Golkar, PAN, Demokrat, Hanura and PPP. The pair won 76 percent of the votes (282,487), winning in all of Trenggalek's subdistricts. The pair was sworn in on 17 February 2016.

=== Vice Governor of East Java ===
After being regent, Dardak attempted to diversify the economy of Trenggalek, promoting tourism and encouraging investment programs in the area - which typically sees less investors than regencies in northern Java. He later became running mate to Khofifah Indar Parawansa in the 2018 East Java gubernatorial election, and the pair won with 10,465,218 votes (53.55%). The pair was sworn in on 13 February 2019.

Dardak is a member of the Democratic Party, although he endorsed Joko Widodo in the 2019 Indonesian presidential election - against party lines.

== Personal life ==
Dardak's father, Hermanto Dardak (1957–2019), was deputy minister of public works under Susilo Bambang Yudhoyono's presidency and in 2015 served as head of regional development in the same ministry. Dardak is married to a fellow actress Arumi Bachsin, who was of mixed Indo Eurasian-Bengkulu descent from Palembang, South Sumatra.
