= Siti Oetari =

First wife of Sukarno

- Born: Siti Oetari Tjokroaminoto; 1905; Ponorogo, Dutch East Indies
- Died: 1986 (aged 80–81); Indonesia
- Spouses: Sukarno (m. 1921; div. 1923) Sigit Bachroensalam (m. 1924; died 1981)
- Children: 1
- Father: H.O.S. Tjokroaminoto

Siti Oetari Tjokroaminoto (EYD: Siti Utari Cokroaminoto; 1905–1986) was the daughter of H.O.S. Tjokroaminoto and was briefly married to Sukarno, first president of Indonesia as his first wife.

== Biography ==
=== Early life ===
Siti Oetari was born in 1905 in Ponorogo city, Ponorogo Regency, Dutch East Indies, the eldest child of Sarekat Islam leader H.O.S. Tjokroaminoto and his wife Raden Ajeng Soeharsikin. Tjokroaminoto was studying in Surabaya at the time of her birth, and although he did visit his wife and child when he could, it was only in 1907 that he was able to bring them to live with him. In 1912 her brother Harsono Tjokroaminoto was born, who would later be an independence activist, politician and ambassador.

=== Marriage to Sukarno ===
Sukarno, the future independence fighter and first president of Indonesia, was a student boarding in Tjokroaminoto's house in Surabaya during the late 1910s. He became quite close to Tjokroaminoto, and was treated as his foster son and protégé. It was in 1921 that Sukarno, then 20 years old, married Siti Oetari. That same year, he graduated from the Hogere Burgerschool in Surabaya and soon he and Oetari relocated to Bandung so he could enroll in the Technische Hoogeschool te Bandoeng. However, according to Sukarno's autobiography, their marriage was a so-called "hanging marriage" which was never consummated because of their young age. While they were living in Bandung, he became enamored of their landlady, Inggit Garnasih. Therefore, he asked Oetari for a divorce and returned to Surabaya to settle things with Tjokroaminoto. Shortly thereafter he remarried to Inggit.

=== Siti Oetari after Sukarno ===
Oetari eventually remarried in 1924 to Sigit Bachroensalam. They had a son, Ir Harjono Sigit Bachroensalam (b. 1939), the father of artist Maia Estianty. They remained married until Sigit died in 1981. Oetari died in 1986 at the age of 81.
