= Fatmawati =

1st First Lady of Indonesia

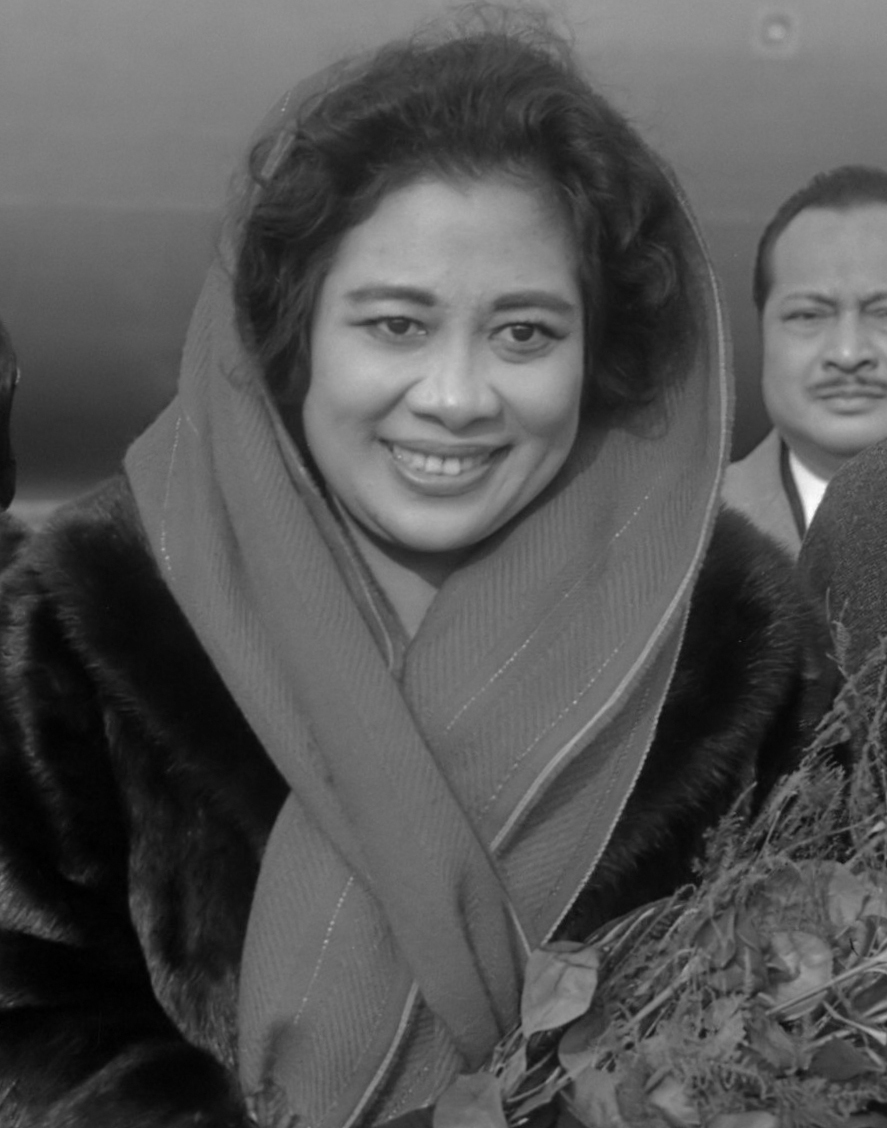
- Fatmawati in 1966

First Lady of Indonesia
- In role 18 August 1945 – 12 March 1967
- President: Sukarno
- Preceded by: Title created
- Succeeded by: Siti Hartinah

Personal details
- Born: 5 February 1923 Benkoelen, Dutch East Indies
- Died: 14 May 1980 (aged 57) Kuala Lumpur, Malaysia
- Resting place: Karet Bivak Cemetery
- Spouse: Sukarno (m. 1943; sep. 1953)
- Children: Guntur; Megawati; Rachmawati; Sukmawati; Guruh
- Parents: Hasan Din (father); Chadijah (mother)
- Relatives: Taufiq Kiemas (son-in-law); Puan Maharani (granddaughter)
- Awards: National Hero of Indonesia

Fatmawati (5 February 1923 – 14 May 1980) was the first lady of Indonesia from 1945 until 1967. She was the third wife of the first president of Indonesia, Sukarno, and the mother of Indonesia's first female president, Megawati Sukarnoputri. She also made the first flag flown by Indonesia.

== Life ==
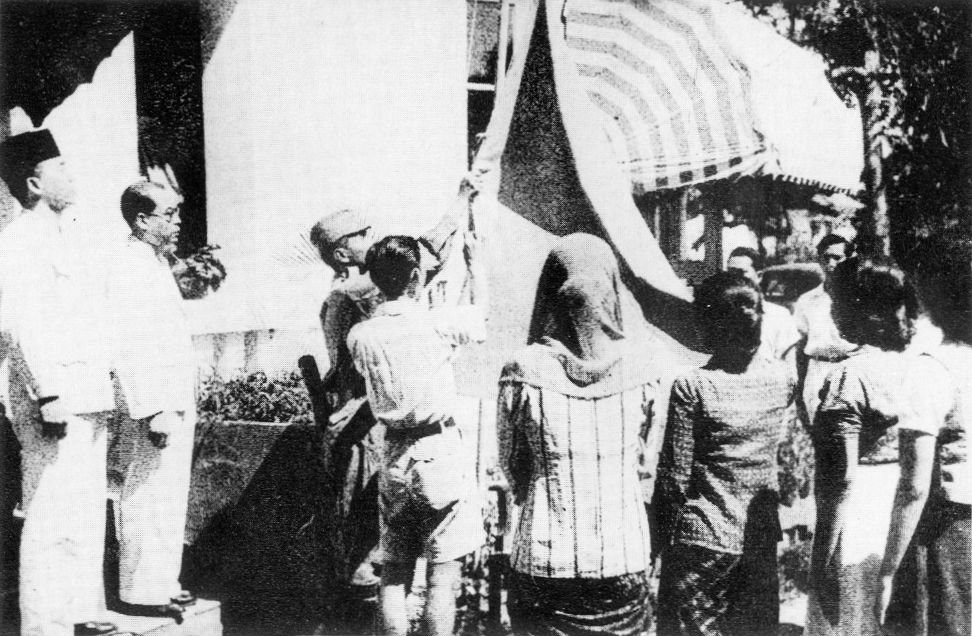
Fatmawati made the first flag of Indonesia. The picture shows the first time the Indonesian flag was raised

Fatmawati was born on 5 February 1923 in Bengkulu to Hasan Din and Chadijah. One of her ancestors was a princess of a Minangkabau kingdom, Sultanate of Inderapura. When she met Sukarno she was a teenager and he was married to a 53-year-old woman named Inggit Garnasih. Unsurprisingly, Sukarno's wife was unwilling to release her husband but, after two years, Inggit agreed to a divorce. Sukarno rationalised the need for his new wife by stating his desire to have a child to carry on his name.

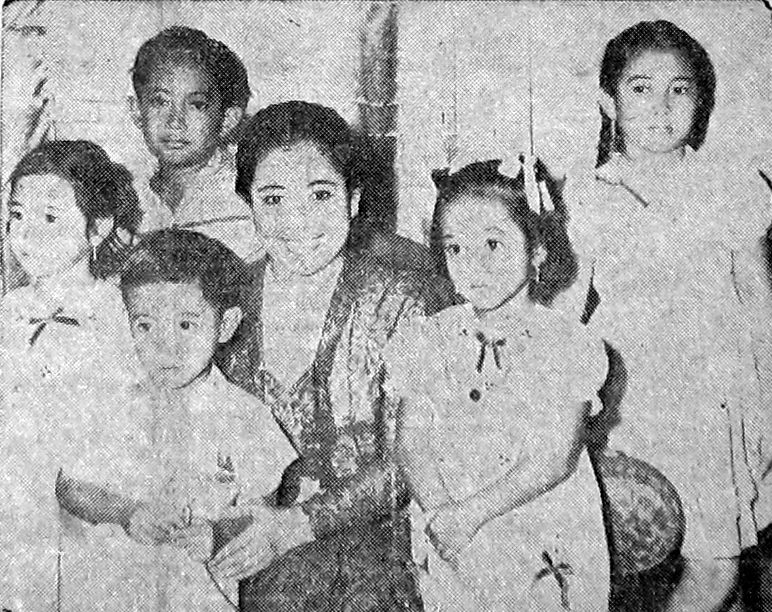
Fatmawati with her five children with Sukarno

In 1943, Fatmawati became the third wife of Sukarno. In 1945 she was his wife when Indonesia declared independence. The flag of the new country was sewn by Fatmawati, and the same flag was flown again every year until 1967. Although she was Sukarno's third wife, all his previous wives had been divorced in accordance with state law. Fatmawati was therefore his only wife at that time.

== Polygamy ==
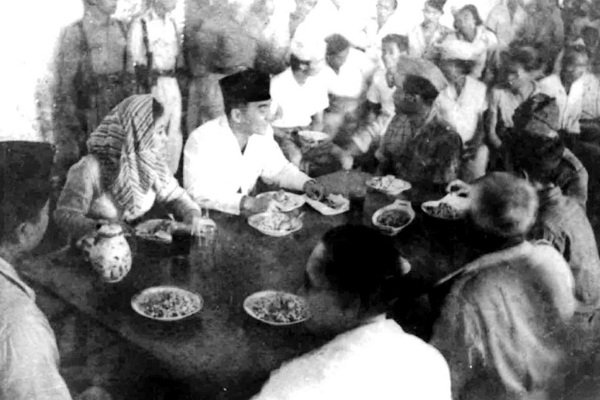
Fatmawati and Sukarno

There was a growing movement to reform women's rights in Indonesia and part of this was to reform the marriage laws. Fatmawati was not initially in favour of reforming these laws until she found out about her husband's intentions to marry again. Moreover, this time Sukarno had decided that he did not want to divorce Fatmawati but intended to have two wives.

Fatmawati objected when her husband took Hartini, his new wife, according to Muslim law. Sukarno married another woman from Java in 1953 and Fatmawati moved out of the presidential palace and lived separately in Jakarta. As part of the settlement, Fatmawati was allowed to keep the title of first lady. This development was a major blow to the growing women's movement. Fatmawati decided that she was going to divorce the president, but she could not find a religious leader who was willing to oppose the will of Sukarno. The women's organisation consoled and advised Fatmawati and they tried to encourage her to return to the palace and reestablish her rights. Sukarno himself was annoyed by this development, although his new wife understood Fatmawati's anger.

Sukarno's new wife bore him two additional children; however, Sukarno reacted badly when he heard that his latest wife had allowed a women's group to consider transferring the title of first lady to her. Sukarno returned and had her thrown out of the meeting and exiled to Bogor.

In 1953 Fatmawati became concerned about the plight of children with tuberculosis. She founded the Ibu Soekarno Foundation to fund a hospital. The following year a hospital was opened with the assistance of government funding. This was called the Madam Soekarno Hospital and Fatmawati laid the foundation stone in 1954. The establishment of the hospital took a long time. The construction of the new building was halted by financial problems and it was not until 1961 that the hospital opened. By that time the hospital was run by the Ministry of Health and did not specialise in either tuberculosis or children but was a general hospital. In 1967 the name was changed to the Fatmawati Central General Hospital.

Fatmawati's second child, Megawati Sukarnoputri, became president in 2001.

== Death ==
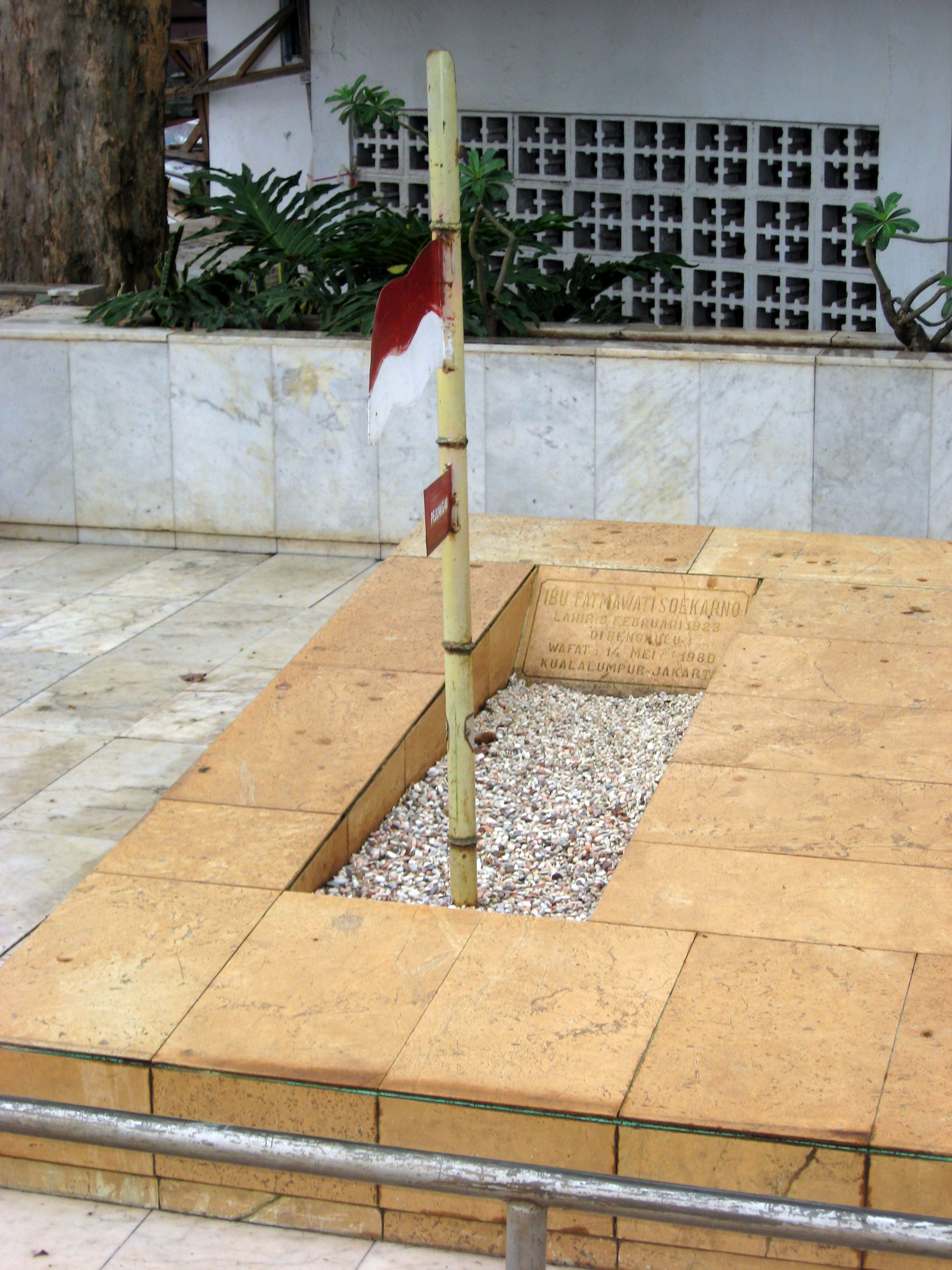
Fatmawati's grave in Karet Bivak Cemetery, Jakarta

Fatmawati died of a heart attack on 14 May 1980 in Kuala Lumpur, Malaysia, on her way back to Jakarta from an umra in Mecca. She is buried in Karet Bivak Cemetery, Central Jakarta.

== Legacy ==
Her childhood home in Bengkulu has become a tourist attraction, and lies on Jalan Fatmawati (Fatmawati Street). The city’s airport is named Fatmawati Soekarno Airport after her.

Fatmawati Central Public Hospital (RSUP Fatmawati) in South Jakarta is named after her, as well as a major artery to the hospital (Jalan RS Fatmawati) and a rapid transit station (Fatmawati MRT station) nearby.

Honorary titles
New title Indonesian independence	First Lady of Indonesia; 18 August 1945 – 12 March 1967	Succeeded by Siti Hartinah
