= Khofifah Indar Parawansa =

Indonesian politician (born 1965)

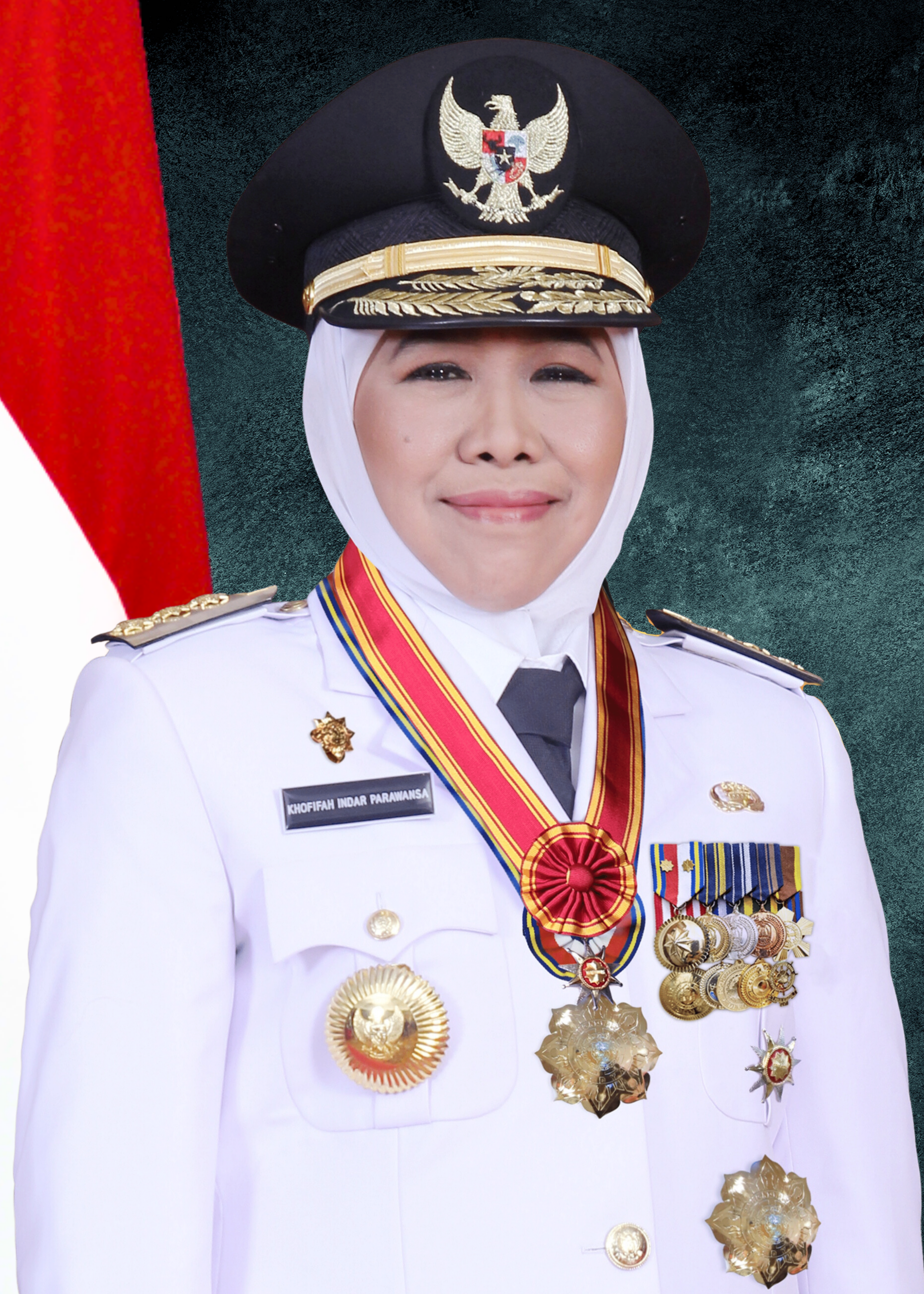
- Official portrait, 2019

14th Governor of East Java
- Incumbent
- Assumed office 20 February 2025
- Vice Governor: Emil Dardak
- Preceded by: Adhy Karyono (acting)
- In office 13 February 2019 – 13 February 2024
- Vice Governor: Emil Dardak
- Preceded by: Soekarwo
- Succeeded by: Adhy Karyono (acting)

Minister of Social Affairs
- In office 27 October 2014 – 17 January 2018
- President: Joko Widodo
- Preceded by: Salim Segaf Al-Jufri
- Succeeded by: Idrus Marham

State Minister of Female Empowerment
- In office 29 October 1999 – 23 July 2001
- President: Abdurrahman Wahid
- Preceded by: Tutty Alawiyah
- Succeeded by: Sri Redjeki Sumarjoto

Head of Population and Family Development
- In office 28 August 2000 – 23 July 2001
- Preceded by: Ida Bagus Oka
- Succeeded by: Yaumil Agoes Achir

Deputy Speaker of the House of Representatives
- In office 6 October 1999 – 28 October 1999 Serving with 3 other people
- Speaker: Akbar Tandjung
- Succeeded by: Muhaimin Iskandar

Member of the House of Representatives
- In office 1 October 2004 – 30 September 2009
- Constituency: East Java I
- In office 30 September 1992 – 28 October 1999
- Succeeded by: Amru Al Mu'tasyim
- Constituency: East Java

Personal details
- Born: Khofifah Tegistha; 19 May 1965 (age 61) Surabaya, East Java, Indonesia
- Party: PKB (since 1998)
- Other political affiliations: PPP (1991–1998); KIM Plus (2024–present)
- Spouse: Indar Parawansa (m. 1992; died 2014)
- Children: 4
- Education: Airlangga University (dra.); University of Indonesia (M.I.P.)
- Cabinet: National Unity Cabinet (1999–2001) Working Cabinet (2014–2018)
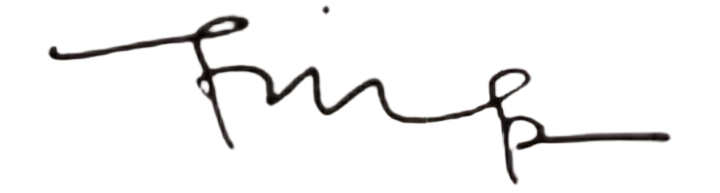
- Signature

Khofifah Indar Parawansa (born 19 May 1965) is an Indonesian politician who served as the 14th governor of East Java, serving in 2019–2024 and since February 2025. She had previously been the 27th Minister of Social Affairs from 2014 to 2018.

== Early life ==
Khofifah was born on 19 May 1965 in Surabaya, East Java.

== Political career ==
In 1999, she served as Deputy Speaker of the Indonesian House of Representatives. She was the first member of parliament who gave a formal critical speech toward Soeharto regime, highlighting 1997 General Election fraud during the 1998 General Session of People's Consultative Assembly.

Afterwards, from 1999 –2001, she served as the fifth State Minister for Female Empowerment, as well as the chairwoman of the Family Planning Board in the National Unity Cabinet.

She was elected chairwoman of the Muslimat, an Islamic women's group affiliated to Nahdlatul Ulama (NU), for the 2000–2005 term, and re-elected three times, most recently in 2016 until 2021.

In October 2014, she became the 27th Minister of Social Affairs, but resigned from the position in January 2018 in order to run in the East Java gubernatorial election.

In August 2015, she launched the "2015 Prostitution-Free National Movement" during a working visit to Jayapura, Papua. The Tanjung Elmo red-light district located in Sentani in nearby Jayapura Regency was to be closed down. Commercial sex workers were to be sent back to their hometowns and given Rp 5 million (about US$500) from the Social Affairs Ministry in addition to another Rp 5 million given by the Jayapura provincial government, in order to find "decent jobs". In early 2016, she announced the government aimed to shut down 100 red-light districts by 2019 in a bid to eradicate prostitution. As of February 2016, 68 red-light districts had been closed down.

In response to homophobic rhetoric from some officials and religious preachers, Khofifah on 16 January 2016 told the House of Representatives that the Social Affairs Ministry does not acknowledge the categorisation or term "LGBT" (lesbian, gay, bisexual and transgender) but only recognises "people living with HIV/AIDS and minorities". She said the ministry's task is "to restore the respective social behaviors of men and women", an effort which "needs to be maximized in order to go back to the way it was before".

Responding to the Jakarta November 2016 protests by Muslim groups and extremists against the city's Christian and ethnic Chinese governor Basuki Tjahaja Purnama, Khofifah as well as Indonesian National Armed Forces Commander Gatot Nurmantyo, Indonesian National Police Tito Karnavian and Islamic activist Yenny Wahid marched in support of interfaith unity.

== Personal life ==
She was married to Indar Parawansa (also rendered as Parawangsa), also known as Daeng Beta (born on 26 July 1960 in Palu, Sulawesi). Khofifah has four children, a daughter and three sons: Fatimahsang Mannagalli Parawansa, Jalaluddin Mannagalli Parawansa, Yusuf Mannagalli Parawansa and Ali Mannagalli Parawansa.

== Honours ==
=== National ===
- 3rd Class of the Star of Mahaputera (6 November 2020)
- Lencana Melati Gerakan Pramuka (14 August 2024)
- Lencana Darma Bakti
- Medal for Providing an Example of Meritorious Personality (23 December 2023)
- Medal for Improving Regional Governance (25 April 2024)
- Lencana Pembina Keselamatan dan Kesehatan Kerja (K3) (2022)
- Kartika Pamong Praja Madya (2021)

== See also ==
- List of governors of East Java
