= Rachmawati Sukarnoputri =

Indonesian lawyer and politician (1949–2021)

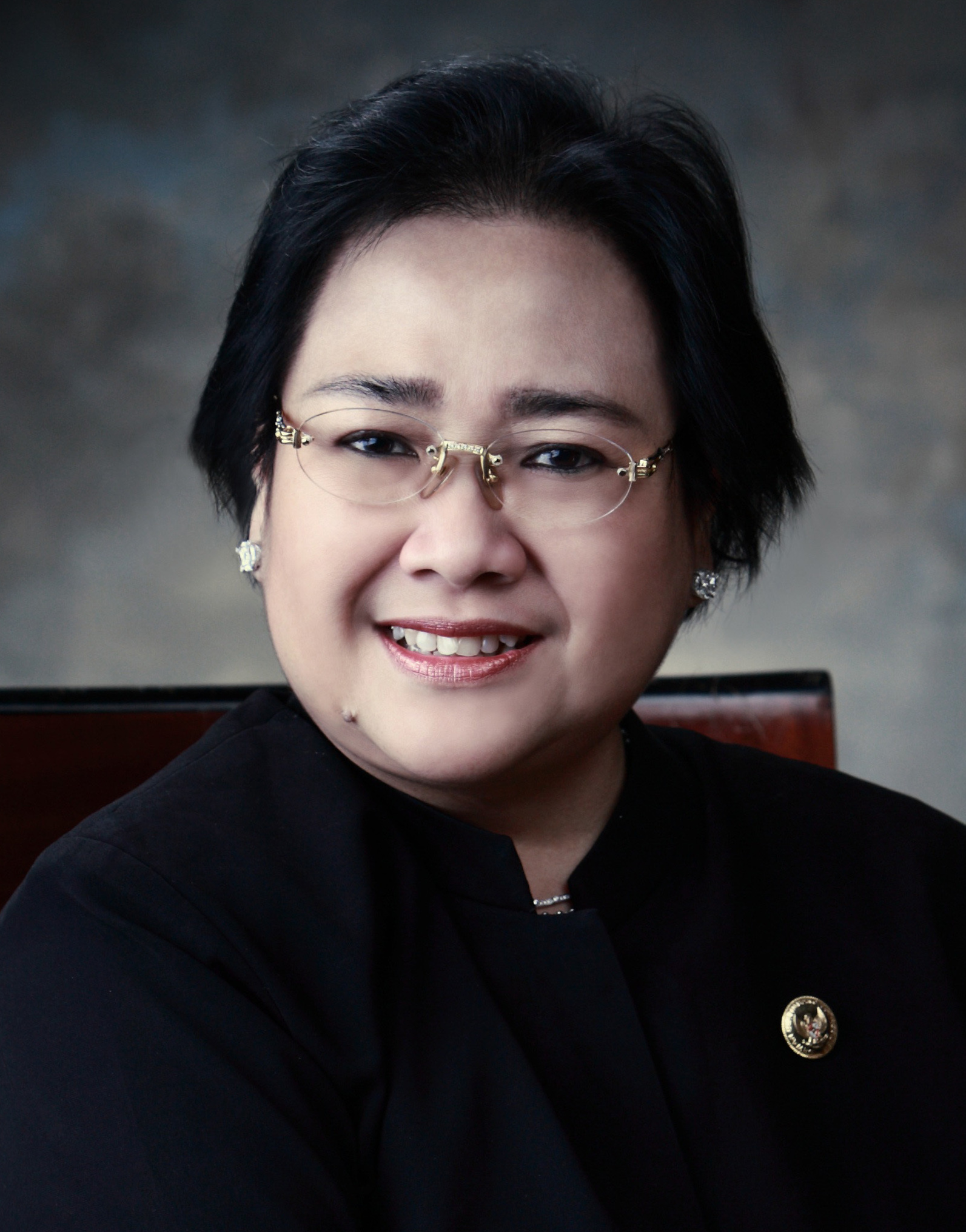
- Rachmawati in 2009

Member of Presidential Advisory Council
- In office 10 April 2007 – 20 October 2009
- President: Susilo Bambang Yudhoyono
- Chairman: Ali Alatas
- Succeeded by: Ryaas Rasyid

Personal details
- Born: Diah Permana Rachmawati Sukarno; 27 September 1949 Jakarta, Indonesia
- Died: 3 July 2021 (aged 71) Jakarta, Indonesia
- Party: Pioneers' Party (2002–12) NasDem Party (2012–14) Gerindra Party (2015–2021)
- Spouse: Martomo Pariatman (divorced) Dicky Suprapto (divorced) Benny Sumarno
- Children: Hendra Rahtomo M. Marhaendra Putra M. Mahardhika Putra
- Parent(s): Sukarno; Fatmawati

Diah Permana Rachmawati Sukarnoputri (27 September 1949 – 3 July 2021) was an Indonesian politician. Her father was Indonesia's founding president Sukarno and her elder sister is Megawati Sukarnoputri, who was Indonesia's fifth president.

== Early life and education ==
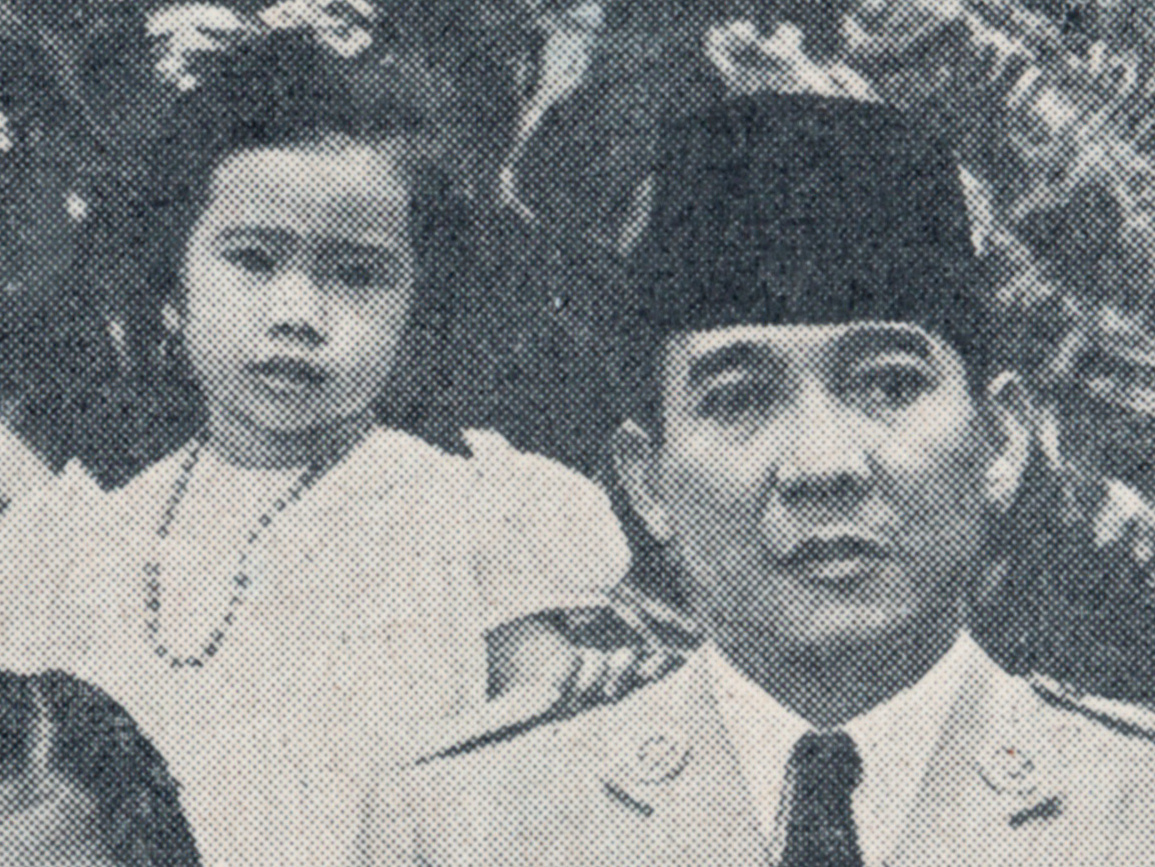
Rachmawati and her father in 1952.

Rachmawati was born in Jakarta on 27 September 1949 to President Sukarno and his third wife Fatmawati and was the third child of this marriage. When she was around three to four years old, her mother left Sukarno in protest of his plans to take multiple wives. She was largely raised by a foster mother from Surakarta. She initially studied at Cikini, and completed her secondary education at St. Ursula Catholic School. She had intended to become a doctor but when she enrolled at the University of Indonesia in 1969 she opted to study law, and did not complete her degree.

== Career ==
Rachmawati founded Universitas Bung Karno in 1983, as a follow-up to an initiative by the Sukarno Education Foundation she had founded in 1981. After the fall of Suharto, Rachmawati directly entered politics, and was a supporter of Abdurrahman Wahid against her sister Megawati Sukarnoputri during Wahid's impeachment. She founded the Pioneers' Party in 2002, and the party contested the 2004 Indonesian legislative election, winning just 1 percent of votes and gaining three seats in the People's Representative Council. It did not win any seats in the 2009 Indonesian legislative election with just 0.3 percent of votes. During this time, Rachmawati served on the Presidential Advisory Council between 2007 and 2009.

She joined the NasDem Party in 2012 and led its advisory board between 2013 and 2014, when she was removed due to her endorsement of Prabowo Subianto in the 2014 Indonesian presidential election.

After she left Nasdem, she joined the Great Indonesia Movement Party, and was made the party's deputy chairman. Rachmawati became a noted and aggressive critic of Joko Widodo's government. She was arrested on 2 December 2016 for alleged treason, being accused of "intending to incite people to overthrow the legitimate government" during the December 2016 Jakarta protests. She was released a day later.

== Family ==
Rachmawati Sukarnoputri was married three times, and twice divorced. She married her first husband, Martomo Pariaman Marzuki, her senior at Cikini, in 1969; they later divorced. Rachmawati then married Dicky Suprapto. After her second divorce, she married Benny Sumarno. Benny, who was also the father of actor Anjasmara, died in 2018. At the time of her death, she had three children. One of her children, Mahardika Suprapto, was elected to the People's Representative Council as a Nasdem Party member in 2014.

== Death ==
Rachmawati died on 3 July 2021 at Jakarta's Gatot Soebroto Army Hospital, where she had been receiving treatment for COVID-19. She was buried following COVID-19 protocols at Karet Bivak Cemetery.
