= Wilangan railway station =

Railway station in Indonesia

Wilangan Station Stasiun Wilangan
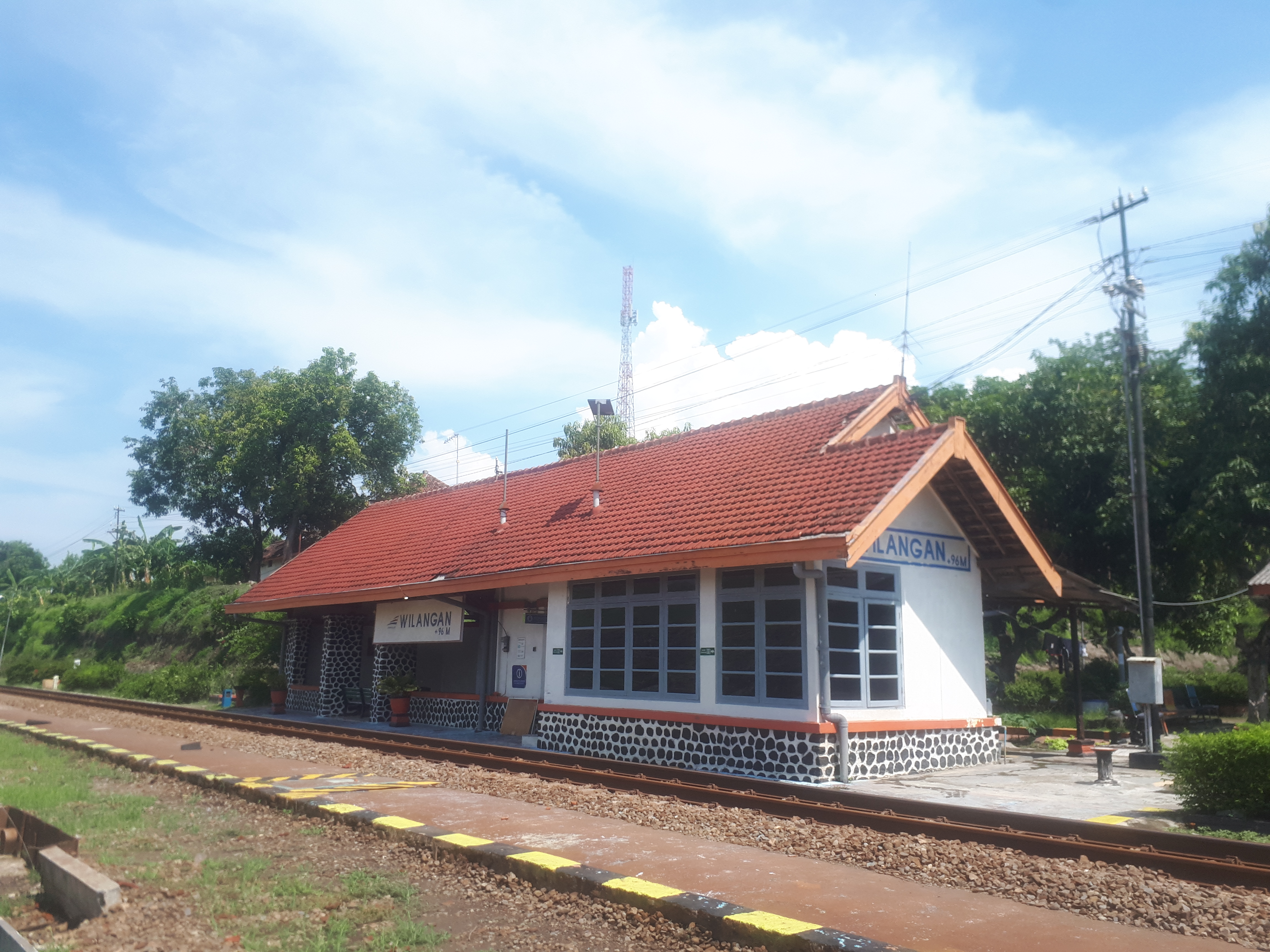
- The exterior of the now defunct station building of Wilangan, 2019

General information
- Location: Wilangan, Wilangan, Nganjuk Regency; East Java; Indonesia
- Coordinates: 7°33′40″S 111°48′13″E
- Elevation: +96 m (315 ft)
- Operator: Kereta Api Indonesia
- Line: Solo Balapan–Kertosono
- Tracks: 2

Construction
- Structure type: Ground
- Parking: Available

Other information
- Status: Inactive
- Station code: WLG
- Classification: Third-class station

History
- Closed: 30 April 2019
Location
- Location within Java

Wilangan Station (Indonesian: Stasiun Wilangan, station code: WLG) is a defunct third-class railway station in Wilangan, Wilangan, Nganjuk Regency, East Java, Indonesia, operated by Kereta Api Indonesia. This railway station is at the most western railway station in Nganjuk Regency. This railway station is located near Nganjuk Regency and Madiun Regency border.

This railway station has been deactivated since Nganjuk–Babadan double-track segment activation on 30 April 2019.

== Gallery ==
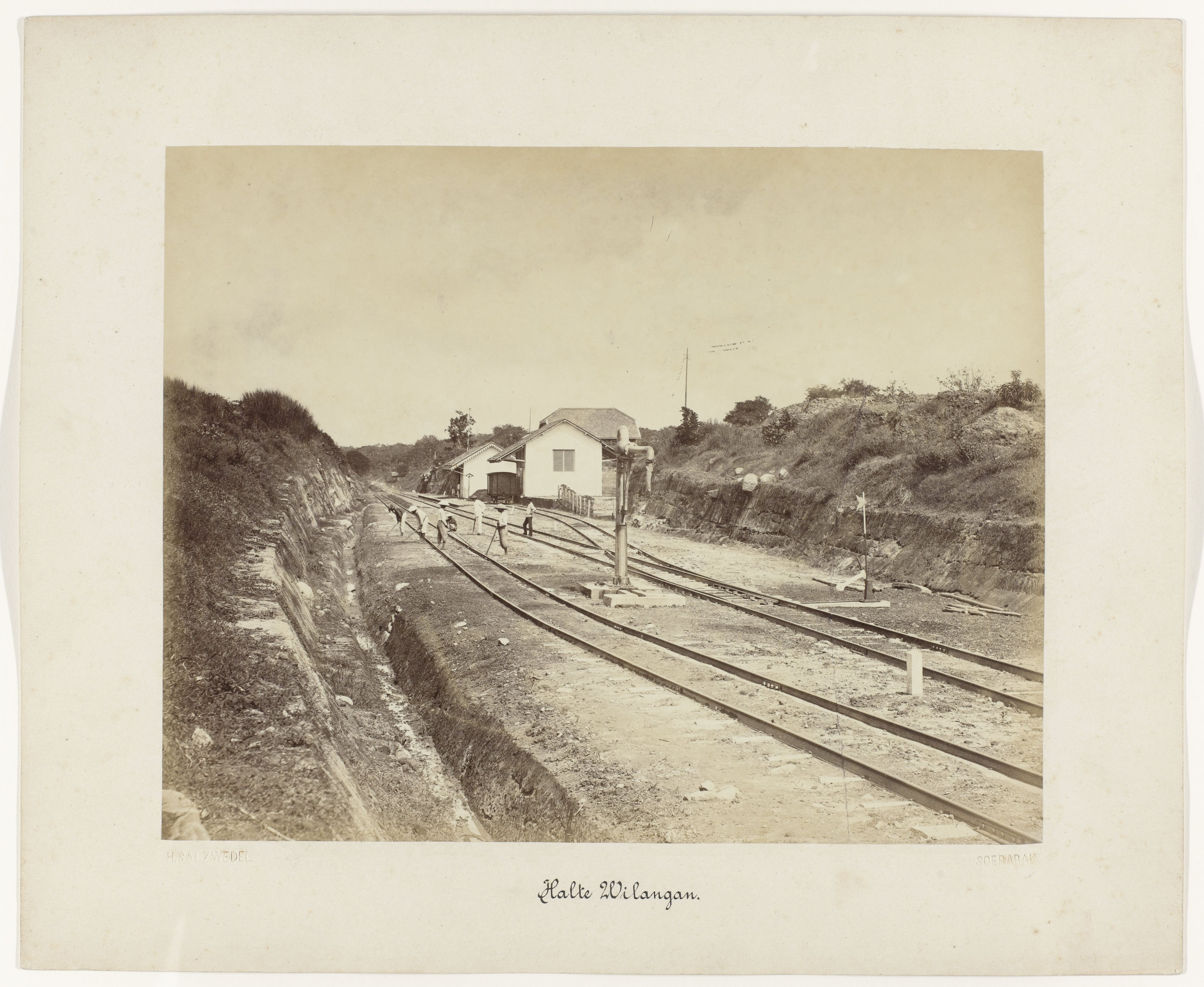
Wilangan railway station photo by H. Salzwedel, circa 1890's

Preceding station	Kereta Api Indonesia	Following station
Saradan towards Solo Balapan	Solo Balapan–Kertosono	Bagor towards Kertosono
