= Masjchun Sofwan =

Indonesian politician

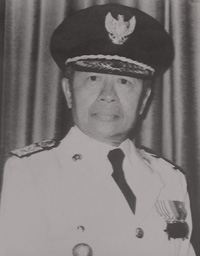

Governor of Jambi
- In office 1979–1989
- Preceded by: Eddy Sabara
- Succeeded by: Abdurrahman Sayoeti

Personal details
- Born: 7 September 1927; Blitar, East Java, Indonesia
- Died: 3 October 2015 (aged 88); Jakarta, Indonesia
- Profession: Governor and Mayor.

Masjchun Sofwan was born on 7 September 1927 in Blitar, East Java, Indonesia. Sofwan became the governor of Jambi from 1979 to 1989. After graduating from Gadjah Mada University, Sofwan served as the mayor of the Temanggung Regency from 1964 until 1978. He replaced Eddy Sabara as the governor of the province.

He died on 3 October 2015 in Jakarta due to complications with an undisclosed disease.
