= Eddy Djadjang Djajaatmadja =

Indonesian army officer

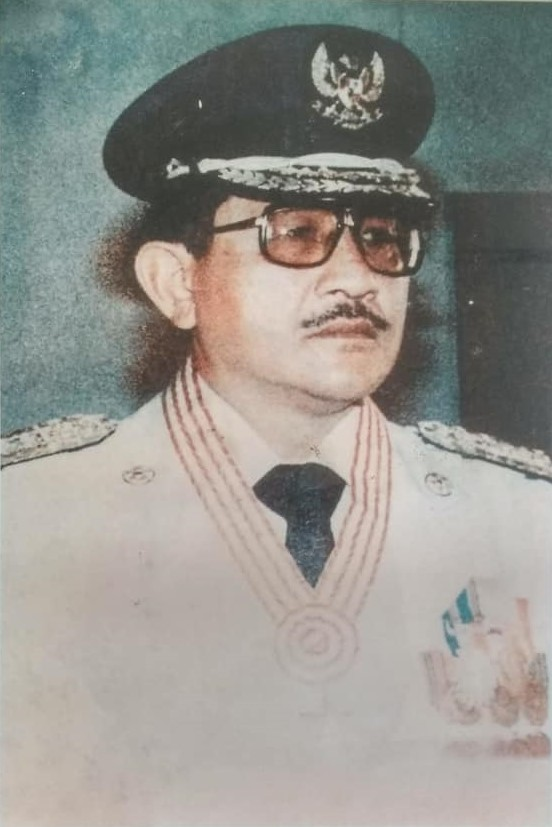

Governor of Central Sulawesi (acting)
- In office 22 October 1979 – 25 November 1980
- President: Suharto
- Preceded by: Moenafri
- Succeeded by: Eddy Sabara (acting); Ghalib Lasahido

Mayor of Central Jakarta
- In office 26 August 1966 – 22 October 1979
- Governor: Ali Sadikin; Tjokropranolo
- Preceded by: office created
- Succeeded by: Soeminto Hadisiswoyo

Personal details
- Born: 1928 or 1929 (age 97 or 98)
- Died: April 1990 Jakarta
- Resting place: Sukabumi
- Party: Golkar

Military service
- Allegiance: Indonesia
- Branch/service: Army
- Rank: Colonel
- Unit: Infantry
- Commands: Tangerang Military District

Eddy Djadjang Djajaatmadja (born 1928 or 1929) is an Indonesian army officer and bureaucrat who served as the mayor of Central Jakarta from 1966 until 1979 and as the acting governor of Central Sulawesi from 1979 to 1980.

== Military career ==
Djajaatmadja was appointed as the spokesperson to the Commander of the Jakarta Military Region at that time, Umar Wirahadikusumah. During his tenure as spokesperson, Djajaatmadja was involved in a controversy with the Communist Party of Indonesia when he accused several members of the party's politburo of wrongdoings in a statement announced on 22 July 1959. The party's politburo sent a letter to the Jakarta's military court three days later, stating that Djajaatmadja has defamed the party and demanded him to be tried in the military court.

At the National Awakening Day celebrations held on 20 May 1959, Djajaatmadja announced that Jakarta residents who did not hoist the Indonesian flag during the day were given warning. He stated that actions would be taken against the residents if they failed to hoist the flag for the second time.

Djajaatmadja was transferred to command the Tangerang Military District, a position he retained after the reorganization of military districts in Jakarta in 1966. He left the role a month later when appointed as the Mayor of Jakarta.

== Mayor of Jakarta ==
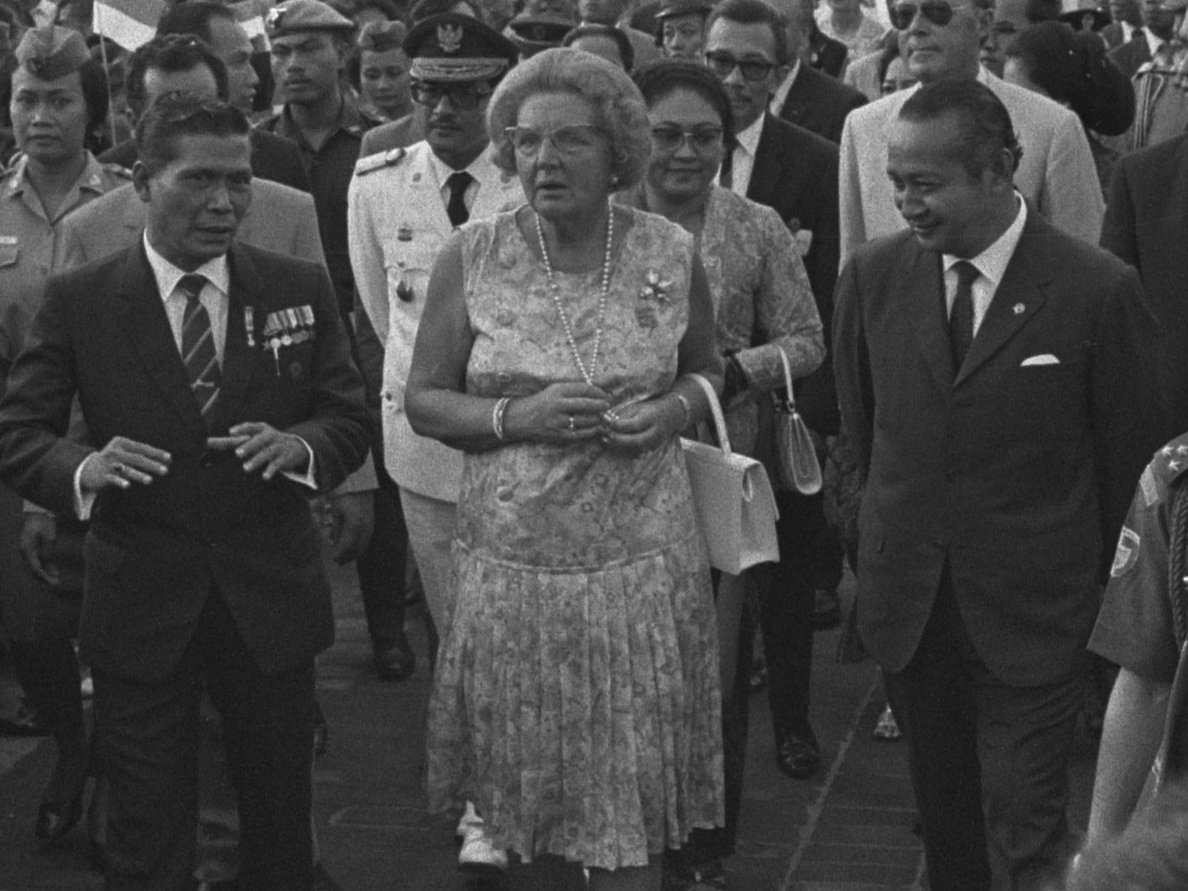
Djajaatmadja, wearing a white suit, at Queen Juliana's state visit to Indonesia in 1971.

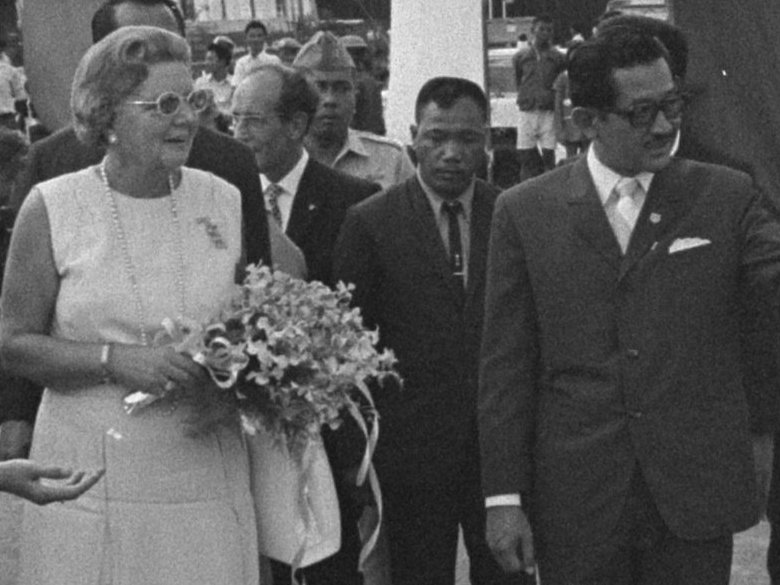
Djajaatmadja (right) with Queen Juliana on the same occasion.

Djajaatmadja became the Mayor of Central Jakarta on 26 August 1966 and continued to held office for another thirteen years. During his tenure, Djajaatmadja was involved in the development of pencak silat martial arts organization. He was initially elected as the chairman of the Jakarta's pencak silat organization in 1978 before becoming the daily chairman of the central pencak silat organization. He was later replaced as daily chairman by Eddie Marzuki Nalaparya after ending his mayoral term and due to frequent health complications.

== Governor of Central Sulawesi ==
Djajatmadja was sworn in as the acting governor of Central Sulawesi on 22 October 1979 after his predecessor, Moenafri, was ousted due to alleged disloyalty to the central government. He refused to live in the official governor's residence and lived in the guest house as a governor. During his governorship, the province's annual budget increased sharply from twenty-five billion rupiahs to fifty-four billion rupiahs.

Several riots occurred in Central Sulawesi as an aftermath of Moenafri's removal. A group of students clashed and damaged the house of several Central Sulawesi bureaucrats. The students later demanded the removal of regional secretary B. L. Sallata from his office. Djajaatmadja refused to fulfill the demands, stating that he had been instructed by the Minister of Home Affairs not to remove any of the Central Sulawesi bureaucrats from their offices for the time being.

Djajaatmadja's acting term ended after he handed over his office to acting governor Eddy Sabara. The newspaper Tempo rumored that Djajaatmadja was removed due to his inability in organizing an election for a definitive governor. Djajaatmadja denied the allegations, stating that the matter was handled by the province's parliament and not by him.
