= Wiweko Soepono =

Indonesian aviator

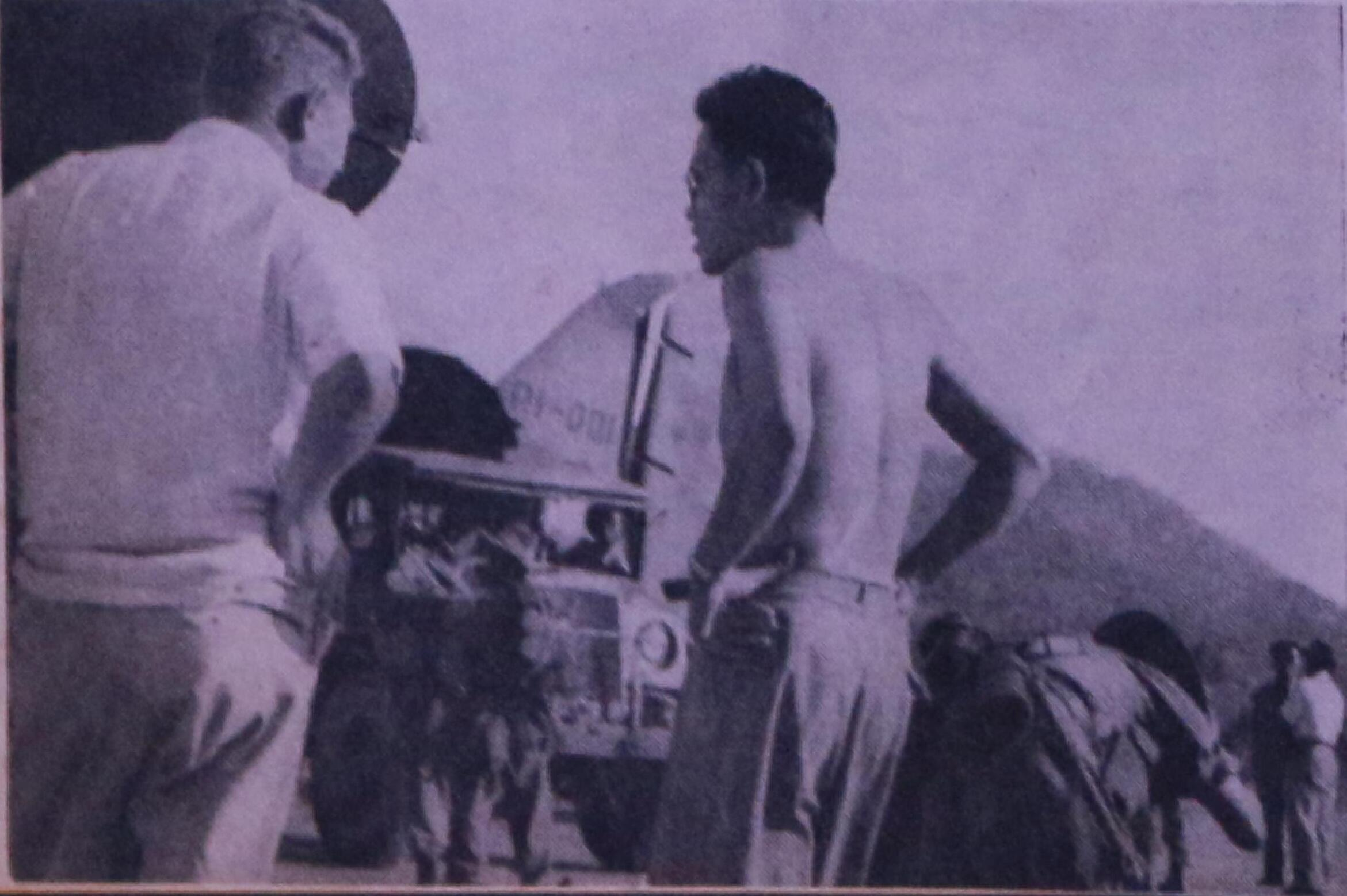
- Wiweko Soepono (middle) in Burma with the DC-3 RI-001, c. 1948–1949

CEO of Garuda Indonesia
- In office 1968–1984
- Preceded by: Soedarmo
- Succeeded by: Reyn Altin Johannes Lumenta

Personal details
- Born: 18 January 1923 Blitar, Dutch East Indies
- Died: 8 September 2000 (aged 77) Jakarta, Indonesia

Military service
- Allegiance: Indonesia
- Branch/service: Indonesian Air Force
- Battles/wars: Indonesian National Revolution

Wiweko Soepono (18 January 1923 – 8 September 2000) was an Indonesian aviator who served as the CEO of Garuda Indonesia, the flag carrier airline of Indonesia from 1968 to 1984.

An avid aviator, Wiweko was well known for his role in shaping Indonesia's aviation industry, from his early career as an Air Force officer until his role as Garuda Indonesia CEO. Wiweko was well known as a pioneer in the Indonesian aviation industry along with R.J. Salatun and Nurtanio Pringgoadisuryo, as well as Yum Soemarsono, who was a pioneer in the Indonesian helicopter industry and a pioneer in the Indonesian disabled pilots training program.

One of his notable roles in shaping the aviation industry was his idea to modify the early three-man crew cockpit of the Airbus A300 into a two-man crew cockpit, which no longer required a flight engineer as its cockpit crew. Airbus co-founder Roger Béteille once regarded Wiweko as one of the greatest visionaries of the aviation industry who was one step ahead in anticipating the future of modern technology.

== Early life ==
Wiweko was born on 18 January 1923, in Blitar, East Java during the period of Dutch colonization of Indonesia. The province of East Java, where the birthplace of Wiweko, Blitar, was located, was also the province of Dutch Aviation Pioneer and founder of Fokker Aircraft, Anthony Fokker, birthplace located in Kediri. Since his early youth, Wiweko has developed an interest in science and technology. One of his hobbies during his youth was reading a Dutch version of Science and Technology magazine and aircraft aeromodelling. Wiweko later-on played a major role in Indonesian aeromodelling and was also regarded as the pioneer of Indonesian aeromodelling.

== Military career ==
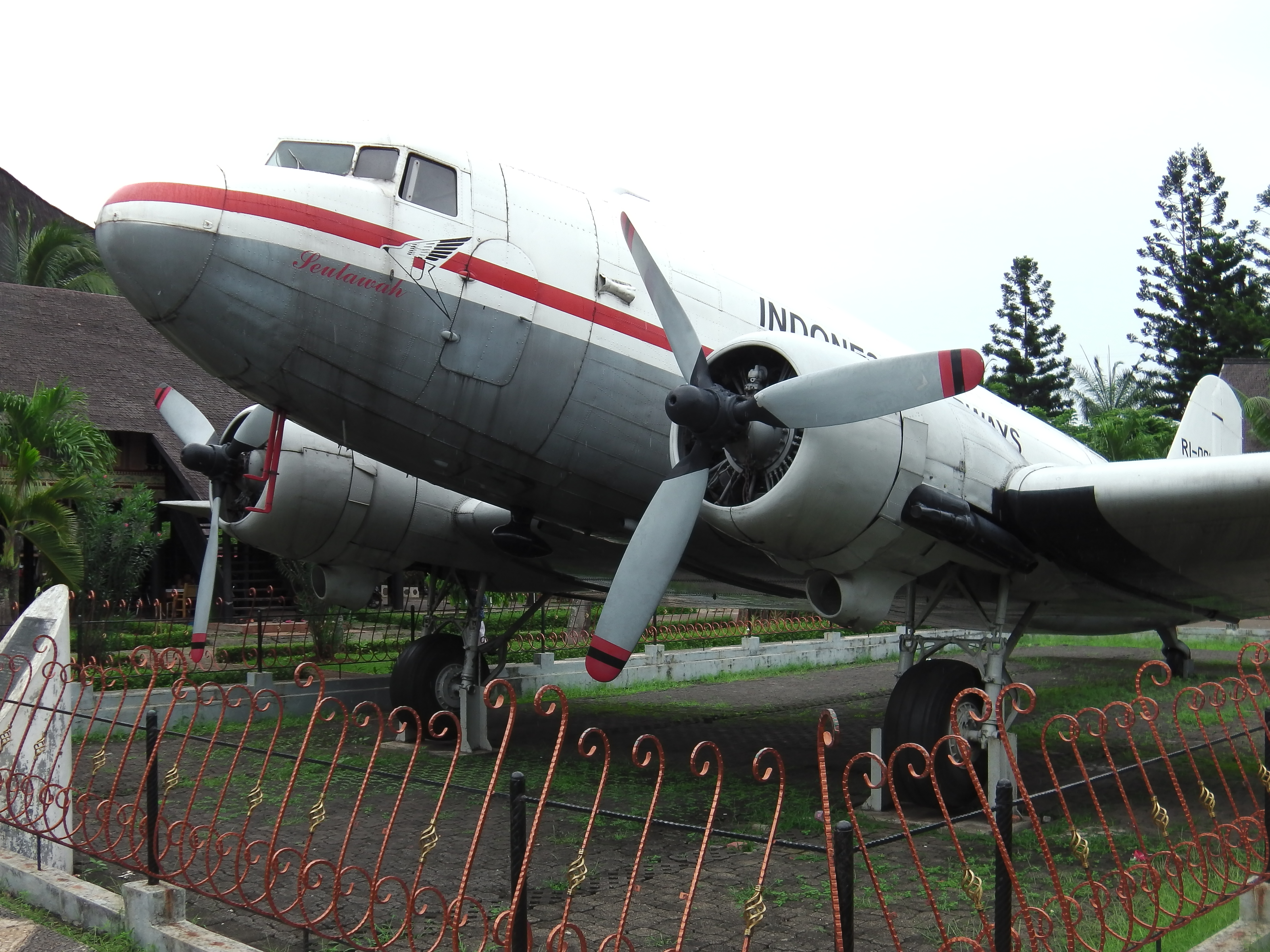
The Douglas DC-3 Seulawah RI-001, now a static display in one of Taman Mini Indonesia Indah Museum.

During the Indonesian war for Independence, Wiweko was part of the team that was tasked by President Sukarno for a procurement program to buy a Douglas DC-3 aircraft for the airlift purpose in order to support the Indonesian War for Independence. The team managed to secure funds from people of Aceh, and later on the fund was used to buy a DC-3 aircraft that was later renamed as "Seulawah," taken from the name of a mountain in Aceh, in honor of Aceh people who already gave much of the fund to buy the aircraft. The aircraft was later given a registration code of RI-001.

Following the Indonesian War for Independence, Wiweko served within the newly formed Indonesian Air Force. During his tenure in the Indonesian Air Force, Wiweko oversaw the procurement of several fleets of helicopters for the Indonesian Air Force, such as the Hiller OH-23 Raven Helicopter, where he managed to gain the qualification to fly the Hiller OH-23 Raven Helicopter.

== Private Sector Career ==
Following his retirement from the Air Force, Wiweko worked in several private sector industries, such as flying a crop-dusting aircraft for agricultural purposes. In the 1960s, Wiweko was recruited by the Bank of Indonesia and was in charge of light aircraft procurement for banking purposes, such as distributing logistics and banknotes to several commuter areas.

=== Trans-Pacific Solo Flight ===
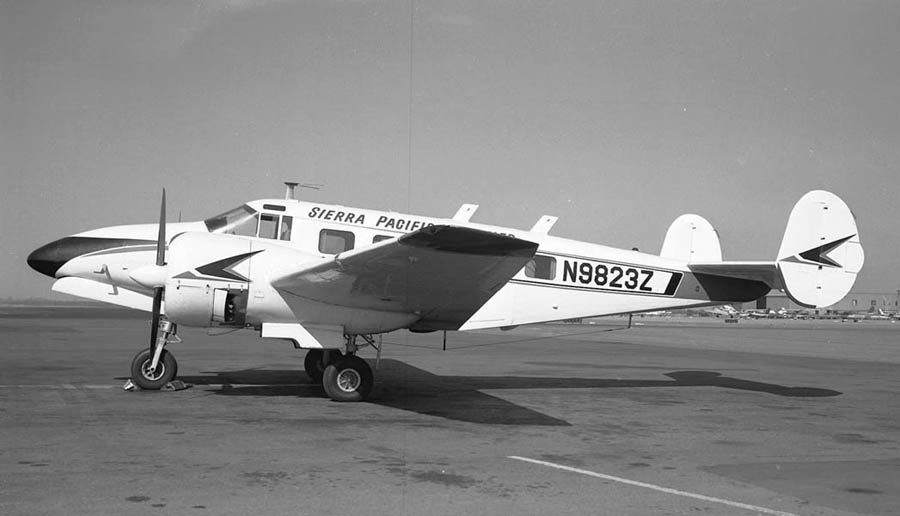
A Beechcraft Super H-18 which was used by Wiweko Soepono on his solo trans-pacific flight from Wichita, Kansas to Jakarta, Indonesia in December 1965.

During his tenure at the Bank of Indonesia, while given the task to oversee the twin-engine propeller Beechcraft Super H-18 aircraft that was ordered by the Bank, Wiweko somehow volunteered to fly the aircraft by himself from the Beechcraft manufacturing installation in Wichita, Kansas to Jakarta, Indonesia, in a solo flight on 18 December 1965. Wiweko also requested the aircraft to be modified with several pieces of equipment, which allowed the aircraft to be operated by a single pilot.

Wiweko flew the Beechcraft Super H-18 aircraft himself alone in a two-day-plus, 12-hour solo flight from Wichita, Kansas, to Jakarta, Indonesia, with several stops for refuel in Honolulu, Guam, Wake Island, and Manila, becoming the first Indonesian to fly solo across the Pacific Ocean.

Wiweko's career in Bank Indonesia lasted until 1968, when he was appointed by Indonesian President Soeharto to lead Indonesia's flag-carrier airline, Garuda Indonesia, as its CEO. This occurred while Wiweko was flying a Bank Indonesia Beechcraft Super H-18 aircraft en route from Denpasar to Jakarta, and when entering Surabaya airspace, he suddenly received an urgent message through his communication radio that told him that he was summoned by the president the next day for an important task.

== Garuda Indonesia ==
In 1968, Indonesian dictator Soeharto appointed Wiweko Soepono to serve as the CEO of Garuda Indonesia. Wiweko became CEO of Garuda Indonesia in 1968 and was leading the company during the era when the aviation industry was at its down peak, due to several crises that had a significant impact on the aviation industry, such as the oil crisis and the rise in oil prices. The economic crisis in Indonesia that occurred in the 1960s during the last few years of Sukarno's presidency also brought significant impact on Garuda Indonesia. This was the primary reason why President Soeharto appointed Wiweko as Garuda Indonesia CEO due to the president's acknowledgement of Wiweko's major contribution to the Indonesian aviation industry.

During his tenure as Garuda Indonesia's CEO, Wiweko oversaw several revitalizations of the company, which included the restructuring of the company and its aircraft fleet, which emphasizes modernizing from propeller-type engine aircraft to a modern technology jet-engine-type aircraft. One of Wiweko's first steps to modernize the fleet is to repurchase again the fleet of McDonnell-Douglas DC-8 aircraft, which previously was a cooperation with KLM.

Over time, as more advanced and sophisticated aircraft occurred by the end of the 1960s, Wiweko managed to secure the delivery of several more new sophisticated and advanced wide-body jet aircraft to Garuda Indonesia's Aircraft Fleet, including the jumbo-jet Boeing 747-200 and a McDonnell-Douglas DC-10-30 and Airbus A300 in the early 1970s.

This led to Garuda's modernization of the aircraft fleet that allowed the airline to expand its international route network and gain more time slots for its domestic flight schedule, which allowed it to fly more passengers on the domestic flight schedule by including several narrow-body jet-engine aircraft such as the Fokker F-28 and McDonnell-Douglas DC-9. By the time Wiweko retired from his position as Garuda Indonesia's CEO in November 1984, Garuda had 79 fleets of aircraft in total, which included four Jumbo-Jet Boeing 747-200, six McDonnell-Douglas DC-10, nine Airbus A300-B4-FFCC, 24 McDonnell-Douglas DC-9, and 36 Fokker F-28, and at that time Garuda was the largest Fokker F-28 operator in the world.

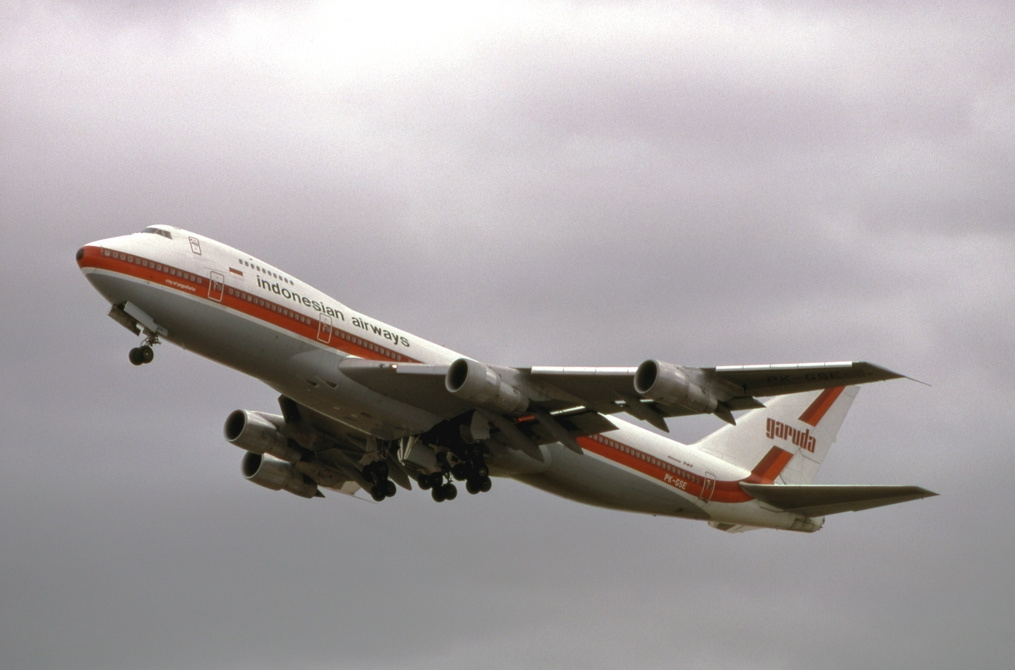
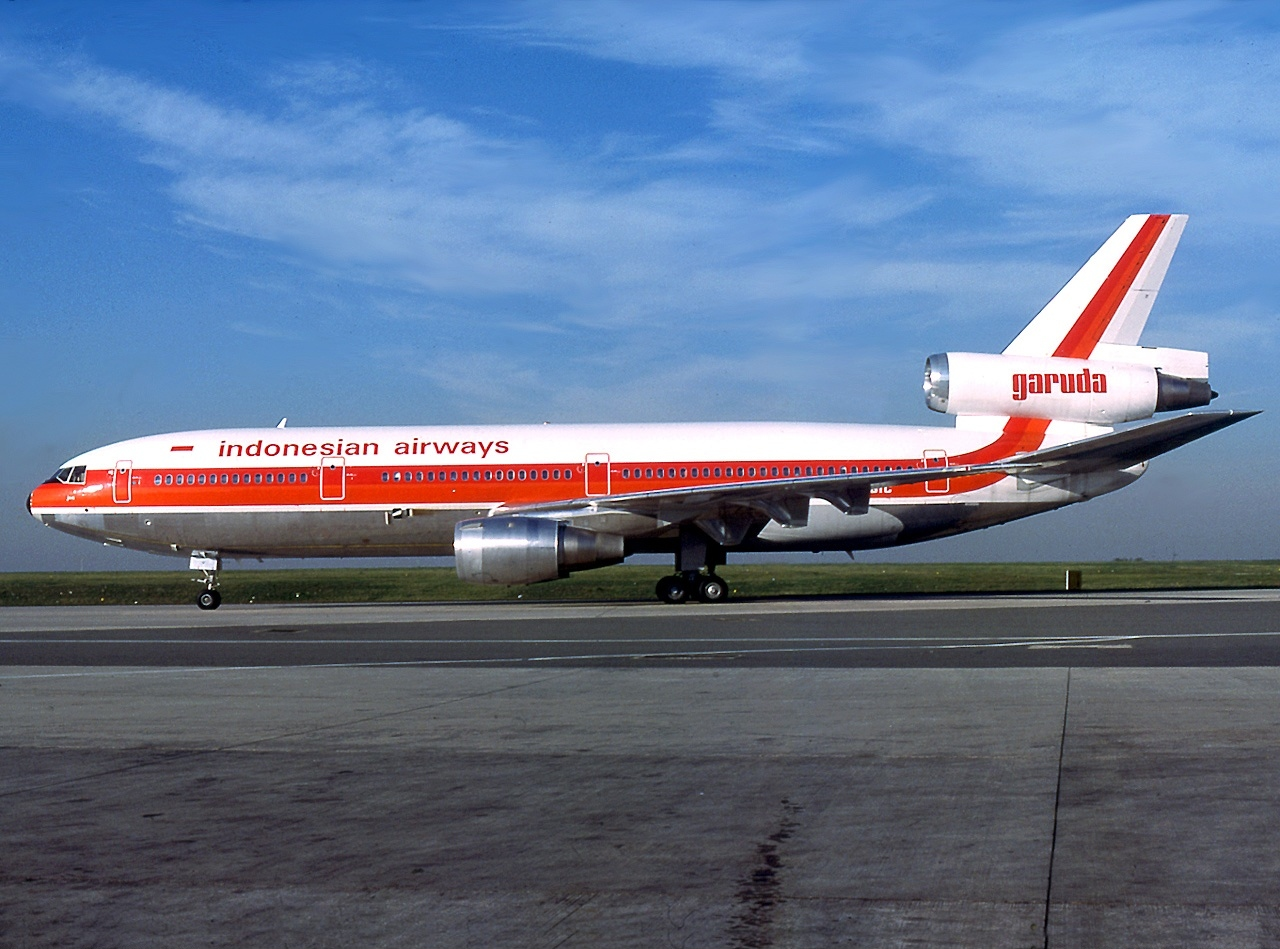
Garuda Indonesia Boeing 747-200 and McDonnell Douglas DC-10. During Wiweko's tenure as Garuda CEO, Wiweko managed to modernize Garuda Indonesia Aircraft fleet which include several wide-body jet-engine aircraft including the jumbo-jet Boeing 747, an Airbus A300 and McDonnell-Douglas DC-10.

As a result, under Wiweko's leadership as Garuda Indonesia CEO, Garuda Indonesia became the second largest airline in Asia, with Japan Airlines as the largest airline in Asia at that time.

With the expansion of Garuda Indonesia's progress going on, Wiweko also emphasized the need to invest more in human resources, such as recruiting almost 500 new pilots for Garuda Indonesia. Most of these are sent to study at flying school abroad. The expansion not only focused on its pilots but also on the expansion for technical staff, ticketing selling staff, and also administration staff.

During Wiweko's leadership, Garuda Indonesia's livery was also being re-branded from the one with the Garuda's bird logo, which first appeared in 1949, to the new one that has the "Garuda" red-colored letter written at its rudder tail and "Indonesian Airways" along with the Indonesian flag in the fuselage. The livery lasted until 1985 and was re-branded again with the new livery that has the green-colored Garuda bird logo on its rudder tail with the "Garuda Indonesia" letter written at its fuselage.

Several major events also occurred during Wiweko's tenure as Garuda Indonesia's CEO, such as during the crisis in East Timor that occurred at the end of 1975. At that time Garuda Indonesia participated in what was known as the "Airlift Mission" from Indonesia through East Timor, which was flying Indonesian troops and their supplies from Indonesia to East Timor. Most of them are flown by Garuda Indonesia's Fokker F-27 and Fokker F-28 aircraft from Madiun, East Java, through Denpasar and through Kupang, East Nusa Tenggara, before being deployed to East Timor. Another major event that occurred during Wiweko's tenure as Garuda Indonesia's CEO was the hijacking of Garuda Indonesia's Douglas DC-9 aircraft "Woyla" by a radical jihadist terrorist group on 28 March 1981, which ended by the raid by Indonesian special forces military commando to take over the plane and rescue its passengers.

Wiweko also initiates the creation of a new aircraft maintenance facility whose purpose is to specialize in aircraft maintenance service. Later on, the aircraft maintenance facility that Wiweko initiated was known as Garuda Maintenance Facility, which was located in the newly built Soekarno-Hatta International Airport.

An avid aviator, Wiweko, who was also a qualified commercial pilot for several commercial aircraft, including the Fokker F-28 and Airbus A300, frequently served as a pilot on scheduled flights while serving as Garuda's CEO in order to maintain his pilot qualifications. Wiweko, who did not disclose his identity as the airline CEO and served solely as the flight captain, sometimes caused many passengers to be unaware that it was the airline's CEO himself that flew the aircraft.

=== Airbus A300 Forward Facing Crew Cockpit ===
In 1977, while overseeing the delivery of the Garuda Indonesia Airbus A300, Wiweko, who was given the chance to fly the Airbus A300 on a test flight, finds out that the aircraft has been equipped with most of modern-day technology that enables the aircraft to be operated easily but is still designed with a three-man cockpit crew that requires a flight engineer in the cockpit. He then suggested to Roger Béteille, who was an Airbus co-founder and who was also in charge of the Airbus A300 project, to design the newly "two-man crew" cockpit that doesn't require a flight engineer anymore and modify it with more sophisticated technological equipment, which allowed the plane to have a two-man cockpit crew and no longer needed a flight engineer as its cockpit crew.

The idea was approved, and Airbus subsequently modified the cockpit of the Airbus A300 aircraft that would be delivered to Garuda Indonesia, configuring it to be operated by a two-person flight crew and removing the flight engineer position from the cockpit. The concept later became known as the "Forward Facing Crew Cockpit" and was believed to be the world's first wide-body aircraft to be crewed only by a two-person flight crew. The Forward Facing Crew Cockpit concept was later developed further and became the primary concept for the modern glass cockpit technology.

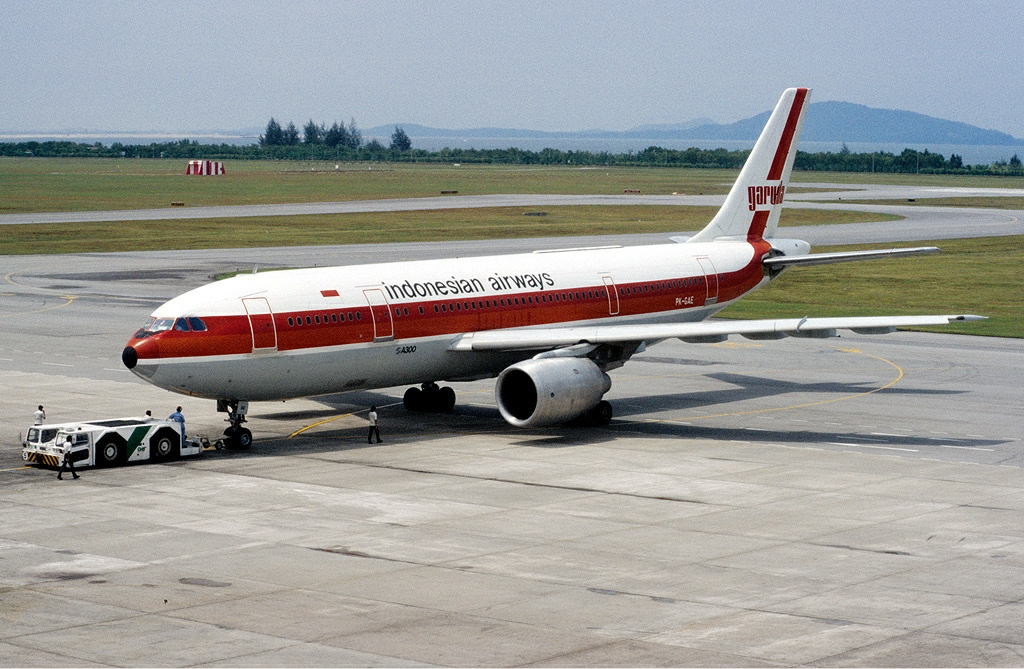
Garuda Indonesia Airbus A300B4-220 with the newly design Forward Facing Crew Cockpit or FFCC Concept.

The Airbus A300 featuring the newly modified Forward Facing Crew Cockpit concept was later designated the Airbus A300B4-220FFCC and was delivered to Garuda Indonesia in 1982. Wiweko who was himself type-rated on the Airbus A300B4-220FFC, personally piloted the first aircraft of this configuration delivered to Garuda Indonesia from Airbus Headquarters in Toulouse, France to Jakarta, Indonesia. During its inaugural delivery, Fritz Winkelmann, Airbus's Far East Area Sales Manager, made the following remark regarding the introduction of a "two-man cockpit crew" configuration on a wide-body aircraft, pioneered by Wiweko Soepono:

"It was Mr. Wiweko who gave birth to the two-man Forward Facing Crew Cockpit. We are proud that this type of aircraft has come to make use of an idea originating from the mind of a son of Indonesia, combined with the new and modern technology, which employs 'push button illuminated switches' and 'digital' system. The two-man cockpit has become a reality, and I believe that this Airbus A300B4-220 with the new 'Forward Facing Crew Cockpit' concept could become the choice of many airlines around the world."

For his achievements in modernizing the Airbus A300 cockpit which enabled wide-body aircraft to be operated only by a two-person flight crew, Wiweko was often credited as the father of "Two-Men Cockpit Crew" for wide-body aircraft.

== Later life ==
Wiweko retired from his position as CEO of Garuda Indonesia in 1984 and was succeeded by Reyn Altin Johannes Lumenta. Following his retirement, Wiweko remained active in the Indonesian aircraft industry and aeromodelling.

Wiweko died in St. Carolus Hospital on 8 September 2000, following a prolonged illness. He was buried at Jeruk Purut cemetery, alongside his wife, Mieke, who died two years earlier, in 1998.
