= Reyn Altin Johannes Lumenta =

Indonesian CEO (1933–2003)

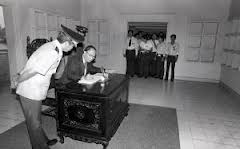

CEO of Garuda Indonesia
- In office 1984–1988
- President: Soeharto
- Preceded by: Wiweko Soepono
- Succeeded by: Moehamad Soeparno

Personal details
- Born: February 26, 1933 Surabaya, Dutch East Indies
- Died: September 28, 2003 (aged 70) Jakarta, Indonesia

Reyn (Rhein) Altin Johannes Lumenta or R.A.J. Lumenta (February 26, 1933 in Surabaya – September 28, 2003 in Jakarta) was the President and CEO of Garuda Indonesia, the Indonesian National Airline, in the period of 1984–1988, replacing Wiweko Soepono. Born in Surabaya, East Java, from a Manado ethnic family of Sulawesi, Lumenta grew up in Indonesia before continuing his education in the Netherlands. He graduated in “Vliegtuigbouw” from Hogere Technische School “Technicum” in Rotterdam in 1956. Having strong relation with Wagey and Saroinsong family clans.

== Career ==
Lumenta started his career in Garuda Indonesia as an Airframe and System Engineer (1957-1958). A year later he was promoted to be Head of Maintenance for Garuda's aircraft and held various Director Positions afterwards until 1975 when he became Company Secretary.

Lumenta was CEO of Merpati Nusantara Airlines, a subsidiary of Garuda Indonesia, in the period of 1979–1983. He managed to convince the government to finance a major modernisation of Merpati, saving the company from debts and possible bankruptcy. Lumenta then returned to Garuda to become president and CEO in November 1984.

== President of Garuda Indonesia ==
As President of the airline, Lumenta led a number of bold reforms in the organisation. On his arrival Garuda Indonesian Airways was in debts of around US$914 million. Under his leadership the company experienced increased popularity and profits.

In 1985 he created a controversy by hiring foreign brand consultants Landor Associates to create a new logo and colour scheme for Garuda Indonesian Airways, a project that cost the company millions of US dollars. The airline was renamed into Garuda Indonesia. This move was later on applauded as vital for the reputation and corporate identity of Garuda Indonesia as the national airline.

Lumenta also increased flights frequency and destinations, reduced ticket prices and collaborated with Merpati, introducing flexible tickets valid for both Indonesian airlines.

Lumenta was also known for his solidarity and generosity to committed employees; he increased staff basic salaries by almost ten folds and improved staff reward and welfare systems.

== Other achievements ==
Lumenta received “Bunga Seroja” award (1976) (see Indonesian invasion of East Timor) from HANKAM, the Indonesian Ministry of Security and Defense for his contribution in the mass transportation of aids and volunteers to East Timor.

Lumenta was a BMW motorcycle enthusiast, having toured Europe, South East Asia and Indonesia with his blue BMW touring motorcycle. Lumenta established Ikatan Motor Besar Indonesia (IMBI), an Association of Big Motorcycles in Indonesia in 1976.

Together with 15 other individuals, in July 1968 Lumenta participated in the establishment of Organisation of Amateur Radio Indonesia (ORARI), a local member of the International Amateur Radio Union (IARU). His code name was YB0BY.

== Personal ==
His other hobbies included black-and-white photography, painting and writing, both in English and Indonesian language. Several of his books and journal articles were published, including Aerodinamika (Aerodynamics) (1985), Mixtures (1982-1984); an 11-series mini book on Radio Amateur, Bermotor (Motorcycling) (1988); about his motorcycle journey across Sumatra, Malaysia and Thailand. His final book Medan – Padang 1.450 (1992) was about his motorcycle trips around North Sumatra and West Sumatra in the same year.

He was married twice and had eight children.

== Death ==
He died on 28 September 2003 and was buried on 29 September 2003 in Joglo cemetery, West Jakarta.
