= Saradan railway station =

Railway station in Indonesia

Saradan Station Stasiun Saradan
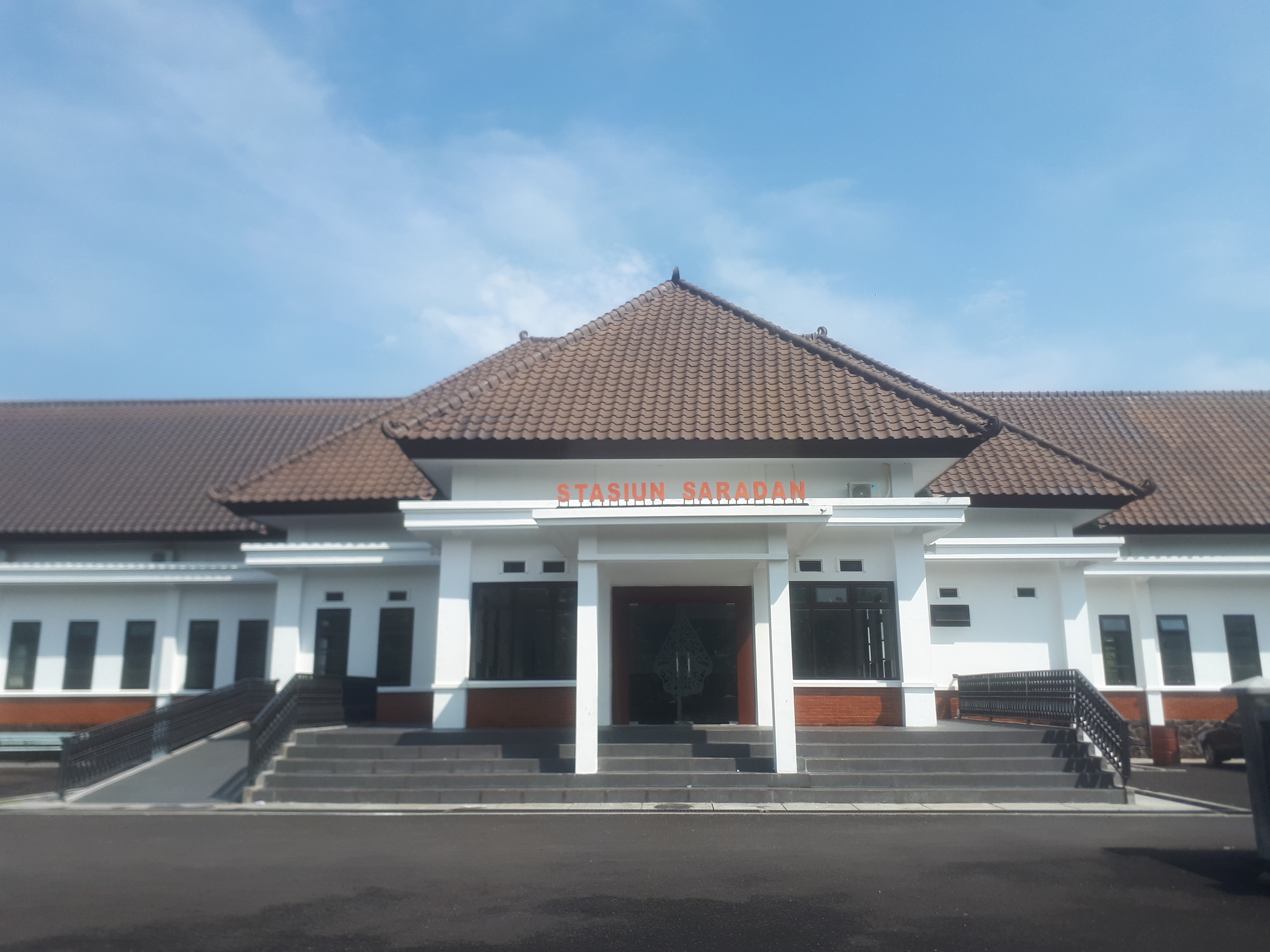
- The front view of Saradan railway station's new building, 2019

General information
- Location: Sugihwaras, Saradan, Madiun Regency; East Java; Indonesia
- Coordinates: 7°32′51″S 111°43′56″E
- Elevation: +107 m (351 ft)
- Operator: Kereta Api Indonesia
- Line: Solo Balapan–Kertosono
- Platforms: 1 side platform 2 island platforms
- Tracks: 4

Construction
- Structure type: Ground
- Parking: Available
- Accessible: Available

Other information
- Station code: SRD
- Classification: Third-class station

History
- Rebuilt: 30 April 2019
Location
- Location within Java

Saradan Station (station code: SRD) is a third-class railway station in Sugihwaras, Saradan, Madiun Regency, East Java, Indonesia, operated by Kereta Api Indonesia. This railway station is at the most eastern railway station in Madiun Regency. This station's new building is operated—which has four tracks (two main lines and two passing tracks)—since Nganjuk–Babadan double track segment activation on 30 April 2019.

Before Bagor railway station, there is Wilangan railway station that has been deactivated since the double-track activation.

== Services ==
This railway station has no train services except for train overtaking.

== Gallery ==
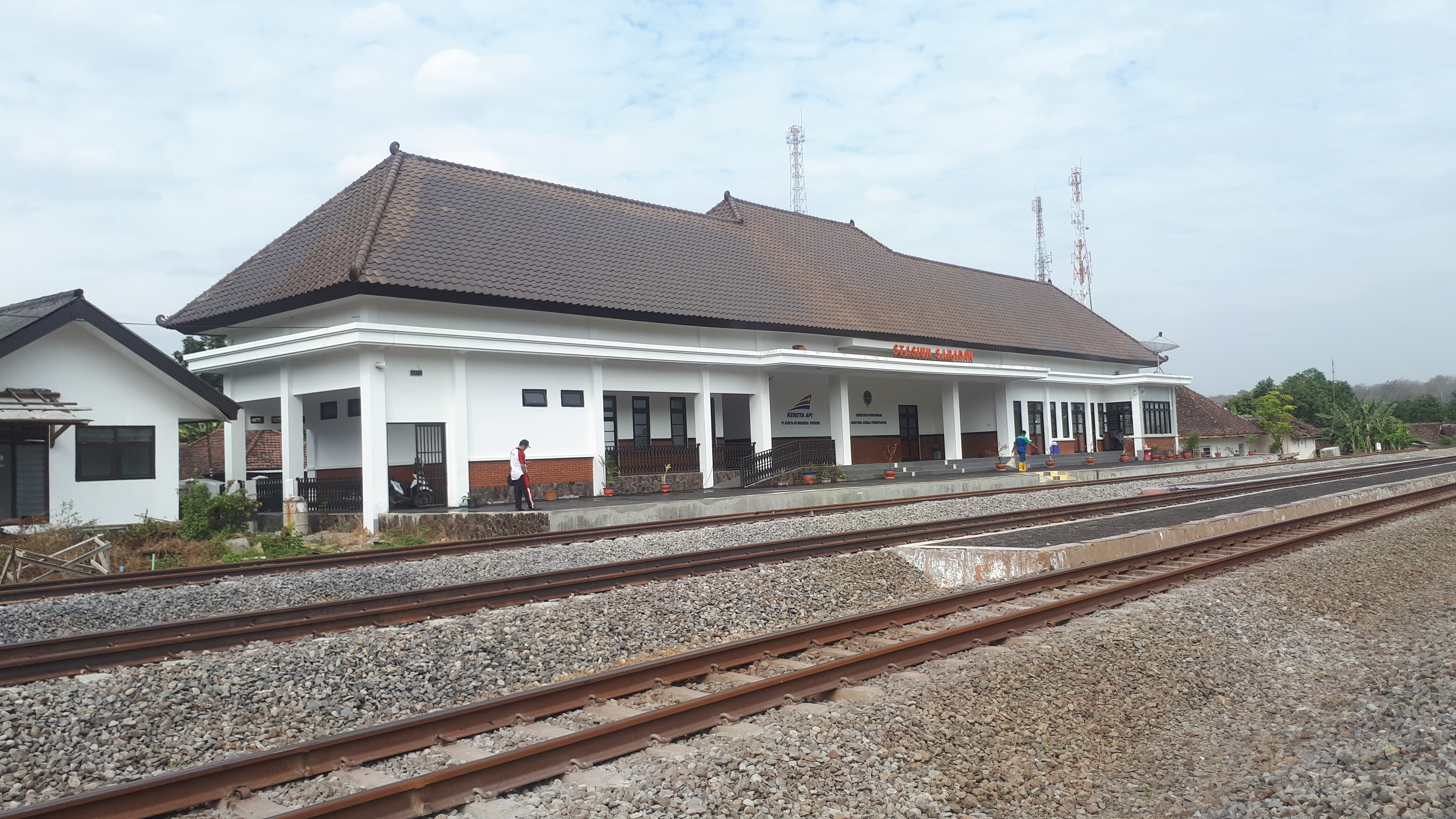
Saradan railway station's rail yard, 2019

Preceding station	Kereta Api Indonesia	Following station
Caruban towards Solo Balapan	Solo Balapan–Kertosono	~~Wilangan~~ towards Kertosono
