= Bagor railway station =

Railway station in Indonesia

Bagor Station Stasiun Bagor
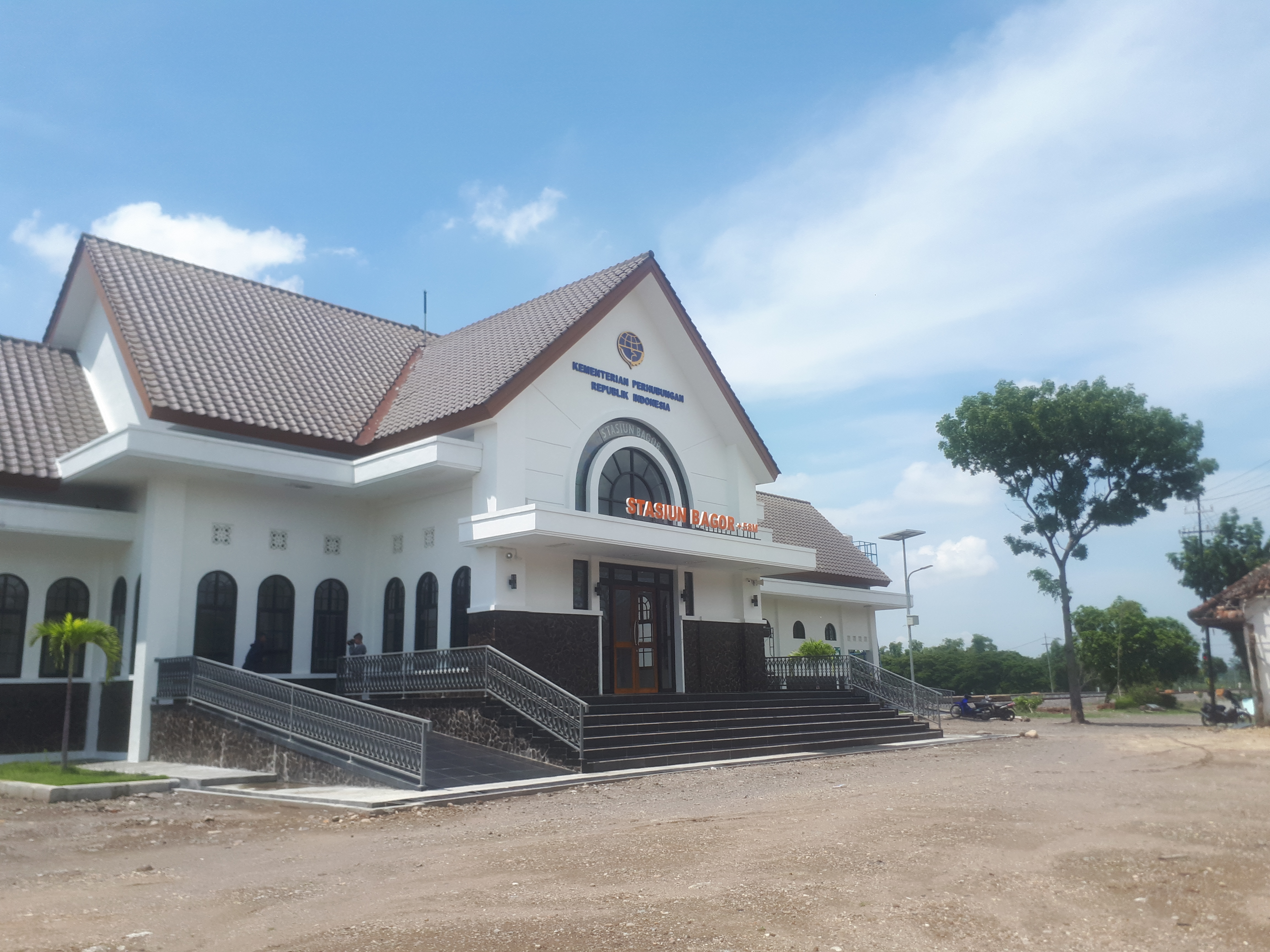
- Bagor railway station's new building, 2019

General information
- Location: Nganjuk–Caruban Road; Paron, Bagor, Nganjuk Regency; East Java; Indonesia
- Coordinates: 7°34′18″S 111°51′10″E
- Elevation: +58 m (190 ft)
- Operator: Kereta Api Indonesia
- Line: Solo Balapan–Kertosono
- Platforms: 1 side platform 2 island platforms
- Tracks: 4

Construction
- Structure type: Ground
- Parking: Available
- Accessible: Available

Other information
- Station code: BGR • 4025
- Classification: Third-class station

History
- Rebuilt: 30 April 2019; 7 years ago
Location
- Location within Java

Bagor Station (station code: BGR) is a third-class railway station in Paron, Bagor, Nganjuk Regency, East Java, Indonesia, operated by Kereta Api Indonesia. 120 m (390 ft) south of Nganjuk–Caruban Road, it is the westernmost railway station in Nganjuk Regency. It has four tracks (two main lines and two passing tracks), and its new building has been in operation since the Nganjuk–Babadan double track segment was activated on 30 April 2019.

Before Saradan railway station, there is Wilangan railway station that has been deactivated since the double-track activation.

== Services ==
This railway station has no train services except for train overtaking.

== Gallery ==
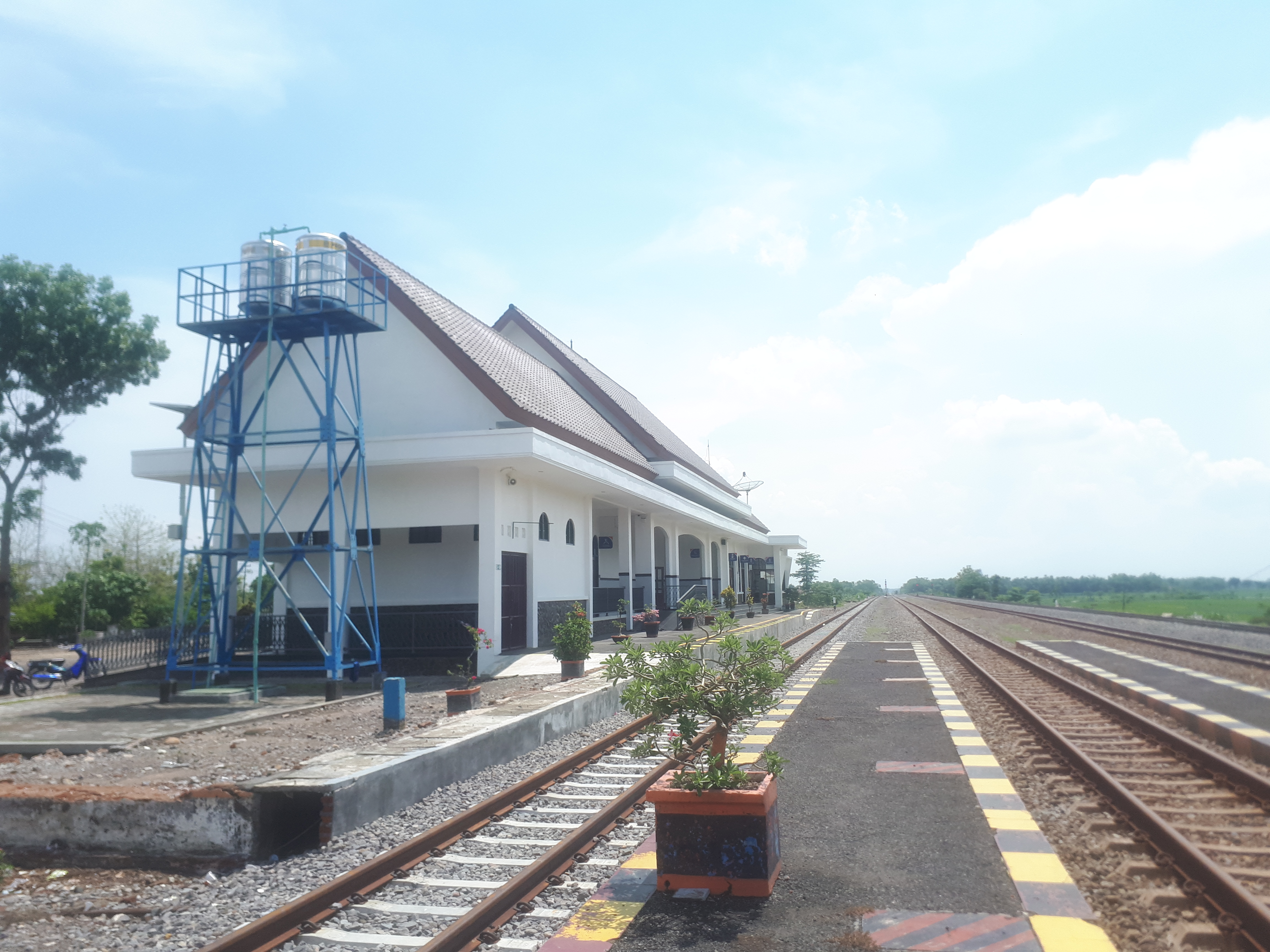
Bagor railway station's platform, 2019

Preceding station	Kereta Api Indonesia	Following station
~~Wilangan~~ towards Solo Balapan	Solo Balapan–Kertosono	Nganjuk towards Kertosono
