= Balitar Islamic University =

University in Blitar, East Java, Indonesia

- Universitas Islam Balitar (Indonesian) جامعة باليتار الإسلامية (Arabic)
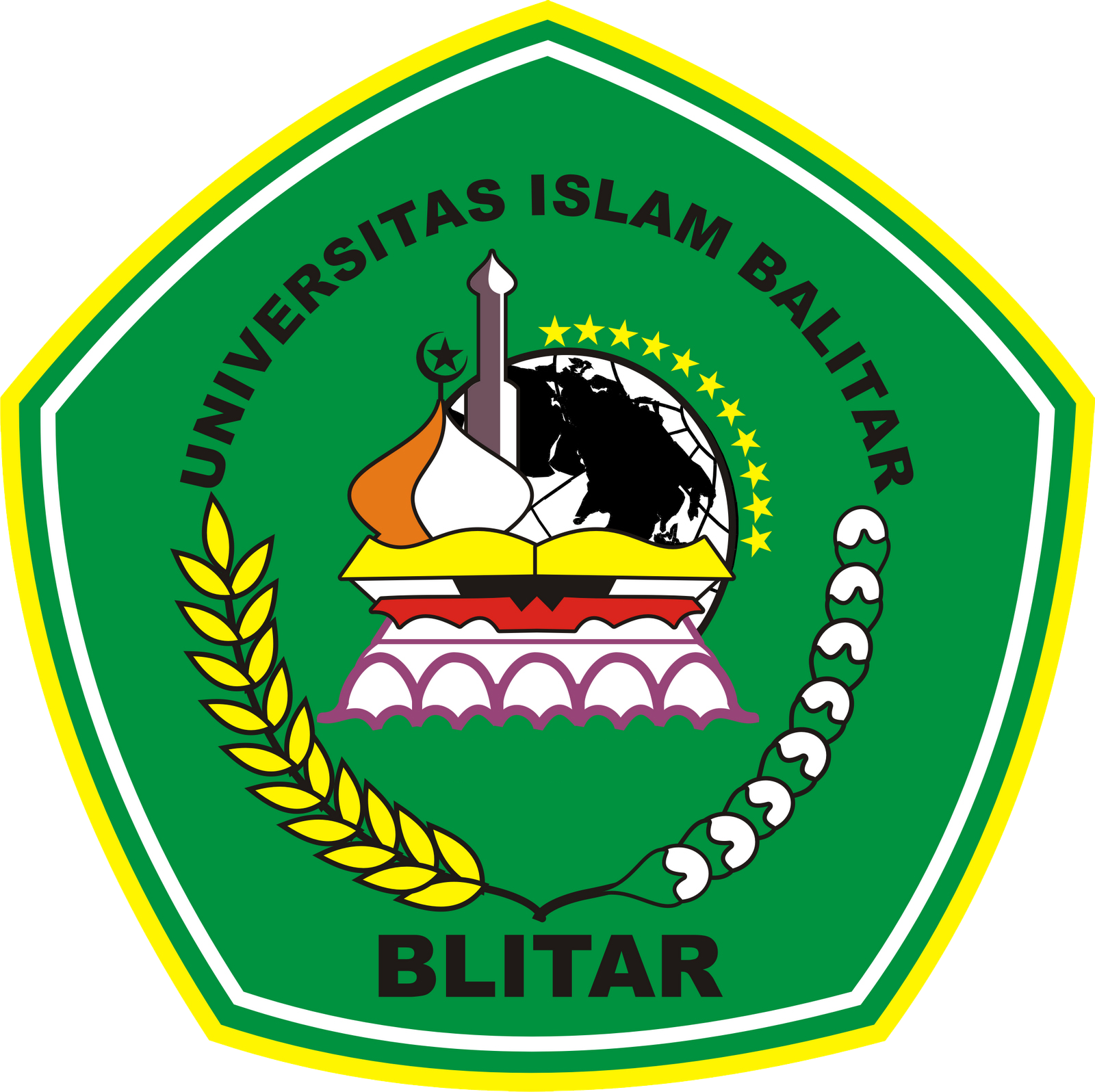
- Seal of Balitar Islamic University
- Motto: The Real Entrepreneurial University
- Type: Private University
- Established: September 5th, 2003
- Religious affiliation: Islam
- Location: Office St. Imam Bonjol 16, Sananwetan, Blitar, East Java, Indonesia Campus I: St. Majapahit 2-4, Sananwetan, Blitar, East Java, Indonesia; 8°5′54.61″S 112°11′1.78″E
Colors
- Website: www.unisbablitar.ac.id
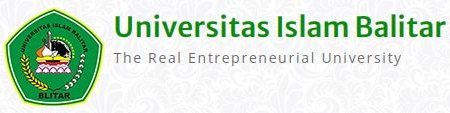

Balitar Islamic University is one of the popular universities in Blitar City, East Java, Indonesia. This private university was founded at September 5, 2003 under the auspices of the Bina Citra Anak Bangsa foundation. Campus which based on Islamic boarding educational this have a purpose to be entrepreneurial university. Entrepreneurial university is a university that has an entrepreneurial spirit and mindset where the activities carried out are oriented towards innovation, value creation and beneficial impacts for the entire community. Higher education institutions have a responsibility to contribute to the economic and social well-being of their communities.

== Background ==
The establishment inisiators of the Balitar Islamic University are Muslim scholars whom were born and raised in Blitar City and want to participate in making the lives of the people of Blitar City and its surroundings more intelligent and prosperous. They argue that it is necessary to have a first university in Blitar City that is based on Islamic values and in harmony with local wisdom. The word "Balitar" was agreed to be part of the name of the university that would be founded because Balitar is acronym of Bali Tartar (the return of the Tartar army) which is a pangenget (sign) given by Nilasurwana or Gusti Sudomo in the 15th century for successfully defeating the Tartar army while hiding in the southern forest (Blitar and its surroundings) who rebelled against the Majapahit Kingdom.

== History ==
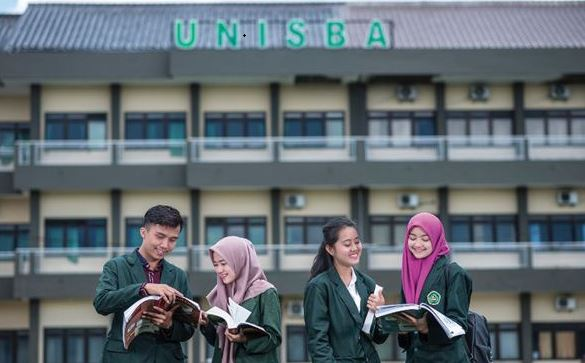
First Appearance of Balitar Islamic University

Balitar Islamic University was founded in 2001, while its official establishment was on September 5, 2003. This university was founded with the hope that a religious, cultured and independent generation would emerge. The development of infrastructure and human resources is pursued on an ongoing basis. The history of the management of Balitar Islamic University can be explained as follows:

=== 2001–2005: Pioneering University ===
Balitar Islamic University was officially established on September 5, 2003. 2001 was the first step in the establishment of Balitar Islamic University and has four faculties, including: Faculty of Engineering, Faculty of Animal Husbandry, Faculty of Agriculture, Faculty of Social and Political Sciences with 9 Study Programs, including: Electrical Engineering, Civil Engineering, Animal Science, Agronomy, Agribusiness, State Administration Science, Business Administration Science, Communication Science and Sociology.

=== 2005–2012: Faculty and Study Program Development ===
In 2005, Balitar Islamic University developed to have 8 faculties. The new faculties that were formed included: Faculty of Economics, Faculty of Law, Faculty of Information Technology, and Faculty of Teacher Training and Education with 8 Study Programs, includes: Management, Accounting, Legal Studies, Information Technology, Computer Systems, English Language Education, Pancasila and Citizenship Education and Biology Education. On During this period, to be precise in 2009, the university experienced difficult times due to problems with EBSBED (Self-Evaluation Based Study Program Evaluation) which resulted in the end of permits for all study programs. After undergoing a series of improvements, Balitar Islamic University was revived in 2012 with all study programs having been accredited and this was the beginning of entrepreneurship learning in all study programs.

=== 2012–2018: Governance Reform ===
Reforms in all fields continue to be carried out including infrastructure modifications, this development was necessary because the previous building could no longer accommodate all students. In this period, the institution has received accreditation and can strengthen its identity as an Islamic campus with the religious curriculum of Islam. This period resulted in various other developments, namely the formation of Student Enterprise, an institution that is able to create student business groups and is able to collaborate with Micro, Small and Medium Enterprises (SMEs) both on a local and regional scale.

=== 2018–present: Towards Entrepreneurial University ===
Balitar Islamic University is currently developing the character of an entrepreneurial university, the university is trying to build good relations and relationships with government, industry and other private sectors with an orientation towards developing entrepreneurship. Good relations and cooperation are also sought with farmers and breeders. This aims to realize the return of self-sufficiency of farmers and breeders in food security so that products are produced by the farmers themselves, determine their own prices and have their own markets. In 2022, Balitar Islamic University has officially established a Faculty of Islamic Religion with three study programs namely: Shariah Banking, Islamic Education Management, and Islamic Counseling Guidance. This faculty has the concept of "Santripreneur" combining the principles of Islamic boarding school, nationalism, entrepreneurship.

== Rector ==
The following is a list of chancellors who have led Balitar Islamic University:

Balitar Islamic University Rectors List
| No. | Rector | Took of Office | End of Office | Explanation |
|---|---|---|---|---|
| 1 | Prof. Eng. Zaenal Fanani; M.S., P.E. Ph.D. | 2003 | 2009 | |
| 2 | Eng. Hadi Siswanto; M.M. Ph.D. | 2010 | 2017 | |
| 3 | Drs. Soebiantoro; M.Sc. Ph.D. | 2018 | (Still in Office) | |

== Coat of arms ==
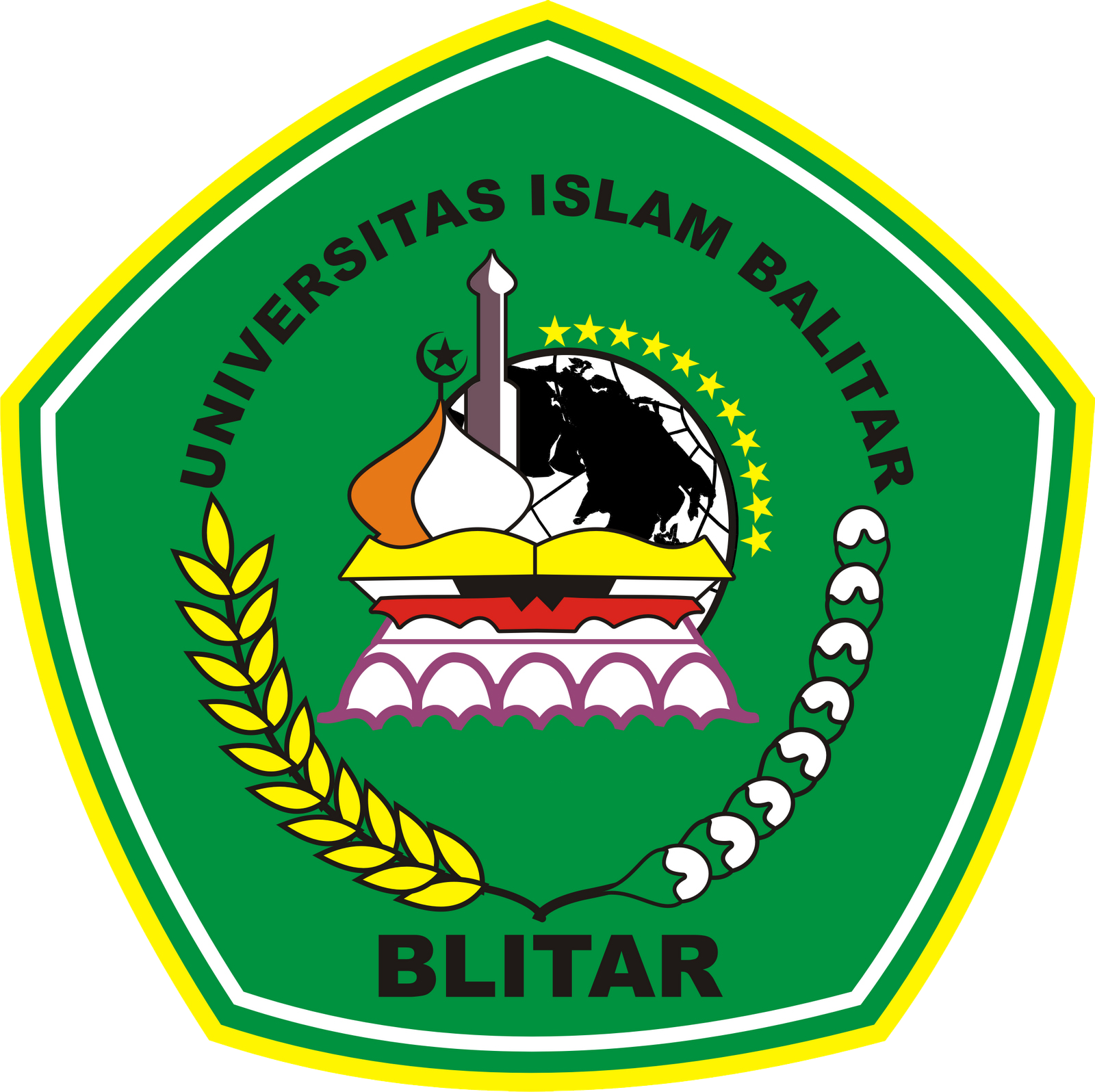
Balitar Islamic University Emblem

The meanings in the coat of arm are:

1. The 5 sided frame in yellow, green and white and the 5 foundations of the mosque in white symbolize Pancasila.
2. The basic color of the logo is green symbolizes growth, prosperity and health.
3. The words UNIVERSITAS ISLAM BALITAR in a semi-circle at the top black indicate the name of the university and symbolize a university with a dynamic leadership spirit.
4. Yellow colored rice, green and white colored cotton symbolize justice, protection and nationality. The number of cotton strands 8 symbolizes infinity (strength, abundance and success) and the number of rice seeds 21 symbolizes unity and oneness.
5. The mosque floor is white and brown symbolizes academic freedom and security. The mosque dome is white and light brow with the moon and stars are black, and one mosque towe to the right of the mosque dome symbolizes a vehicle for self-approach to God.
6. Yellow colored book and white colored pen symbolize learning and knowledge.
7. The globe and black toga symbolize a competent scholar and intellectual.
8. Golden stars numbering 11 symbolizes light and insight into the spirituality of Islamic values.
9. The text below BLITAR states the place of residence of the university.

== Faculty and Study programs ==
The following is a list of faculties and study programs at Balitar Islamic University:

=== Undergraduate Program ===
- Faculty of Agriculture & Animal Husbandry
  - Agribusiness
  - Agrotechnology
  - Animal Science
- Faculty of Economic
  - Management
  - Accountancy
- Faculty of Engineering
  - Civil Engineering
  - Electronics Engineering
- Faculty of Information Technology
  - Informatics Engineering
  - Computer System
- Faculty of Law
  - Law Science
- Faculty of Social and Political Science
  - State Administration Science
  - Business Administration Science
  - Sociology
  - Communication Science
- Faculty of Teacher and Education
  - English Education
  - Primary Teacher Education
  - Pancasila and Civic Education
  - Biology Education
- Faculty of Islamic Religion
  - Islamic Education Management
  - Islamic Counceling Guidance
  - Shariah Banking

=== Postgraduate Program ===
- Faculty of Islamic Religion
  - Islamic Education Management

== Facility ==
Balitar Islamic University has facilities to develop student intellectual, namely:

- Sport Arena
- Digital Library
- Academic Counseling
- Career Services
- Tax Center
- Study Abroad Program
- International Student Admissions
- Halal Center

== Reputation ==
- The Most Trusted Education Award 2016
- CSR Award Blitar Regency Government 2021
- Accreditation "Very Well" from Republic of Indonesia National Accreditation Board for Higher Education (BAN-PT)
