= Grave of Sukarno =

Grave of Sukarno in East Java, Indonesia

Grave of Bung Sukarno
- Makam Bung Karno
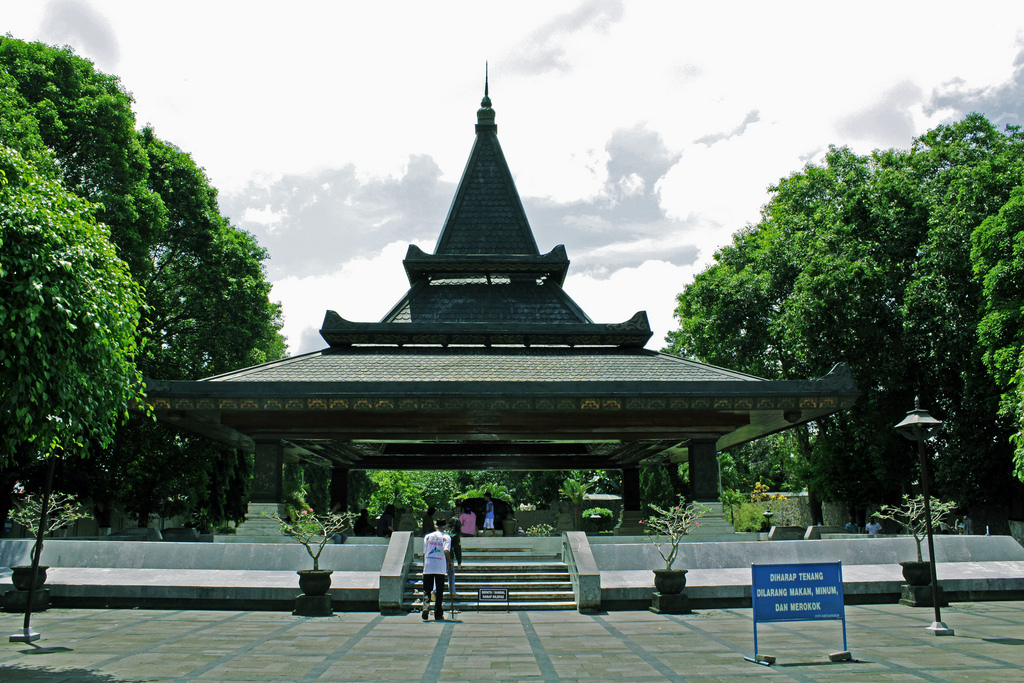
- Grave of Sukarno in 2008
- Interactive map of Grave of Bung Sukarno
- Location: Bendogerit, Sananwetan, Blitar, East Java
- Coordinates: 8.0846°S 112.1761°E
- Type: Mausoleum
- Dedicated to: Sukarno

The Grave of Sukarno (or Bung Karno's Grave), Indonesia's first president, is located in Blitar, East Java. Initially, he had an ordinary grave where he was buried shortly after his death. Later, a mausoleum was constructed in the late 1970s and the site evolved into a political and religious pilgrimage site, receiving hundreds of thousands of visitors annually.

== History ==
During the transition to the New Order, deposed first president of Indonesia Sukarno was placed under house arrest, and he requested that he be buried in a simple grave close to the Bogor Palace. Following Sukarno's death on 21 June 1970, then-incumbent Suharto decided to bury the former president in a public cemetery at Blitar, (Note: Sukarno was born in Surabaya, but a common misconception is that he was born in Blitar due to a mistranslation.) East Java, next to Sukarno's mother's grave. Sukarno's family protested his burial in Blitar, and the anti-Suharto newspaper Merdeka published an editorial stating that Sukarno had wished to be buried near Bandung. In his later autobiography, Suharto claimed that Sukarno's large family had differing views on the burial site, and argued that Sukarno had been very close to his mother during her life. A historian later claimed that Suharto's decision to bury Sukarno in Blitar was to avoid pilgrimages to Sukarno's grave too close to the political center of power in Jakarta.

In the first years after Sukarno's burial, pilgrims would visit his grave and often took some of the soil, at some point causing concern that all the soil on his grave would be gone and forcing the government to regulate access to his grave. By 1977, dissatisfaction with Suharto's rule resulted in the loosening of the De-Sukarnoization policy and a rehabilitation of Sukarno's legacy, including his grave, and the following year the government decided to construct a mausoleum over the grave. In 1979, on the ninth anniversary of Sukarno's death, Suharto dedicated the new mausoleum, in a ceremony attended by approximately one million people. Again, members of Sukarno's family criticized the decision to build the mausoleum, with Sukarno's son Guntur saying that Sukarno's family was not involved in the mausoleum's construction. Regardless, high-ranking officials of Suharto's government would make publicized pilgrimages to the tomb, and in 1980 1.4 million people visited the site.

Each year, on the anniversary of Sukarno's death, his family (in particular his daughter Megawati Sukarnoputri, chairman of the Indonesian Democratic Party) would utilize the crowds visiting the mausoleum as a representation of dissent against Suharto's government in the national media. In 1995, there were around 10,000 visitors to the annual commemoration. There were initially fences surrounding the grave preventing it from becoming a pilgrimage site and keeping the grave itself sterile of visitors, but after the fall of Suharto, Megawati became president in 2001, and the site began attracting a large number of pilgrims from across Indonesia. In June 2001, it was estimated that 25,000 people visited the grave daily.

While it was not feasible during Suharto's era, after Suharto's fall Blitar's city administration under Djarot Saiful Hidayat chose to utilize the grave in order to improve the city's allure as a tourist destination, and many statues of Sukarno were built across the city while old sites associated with Sukarno were restored.

=== Current status ===
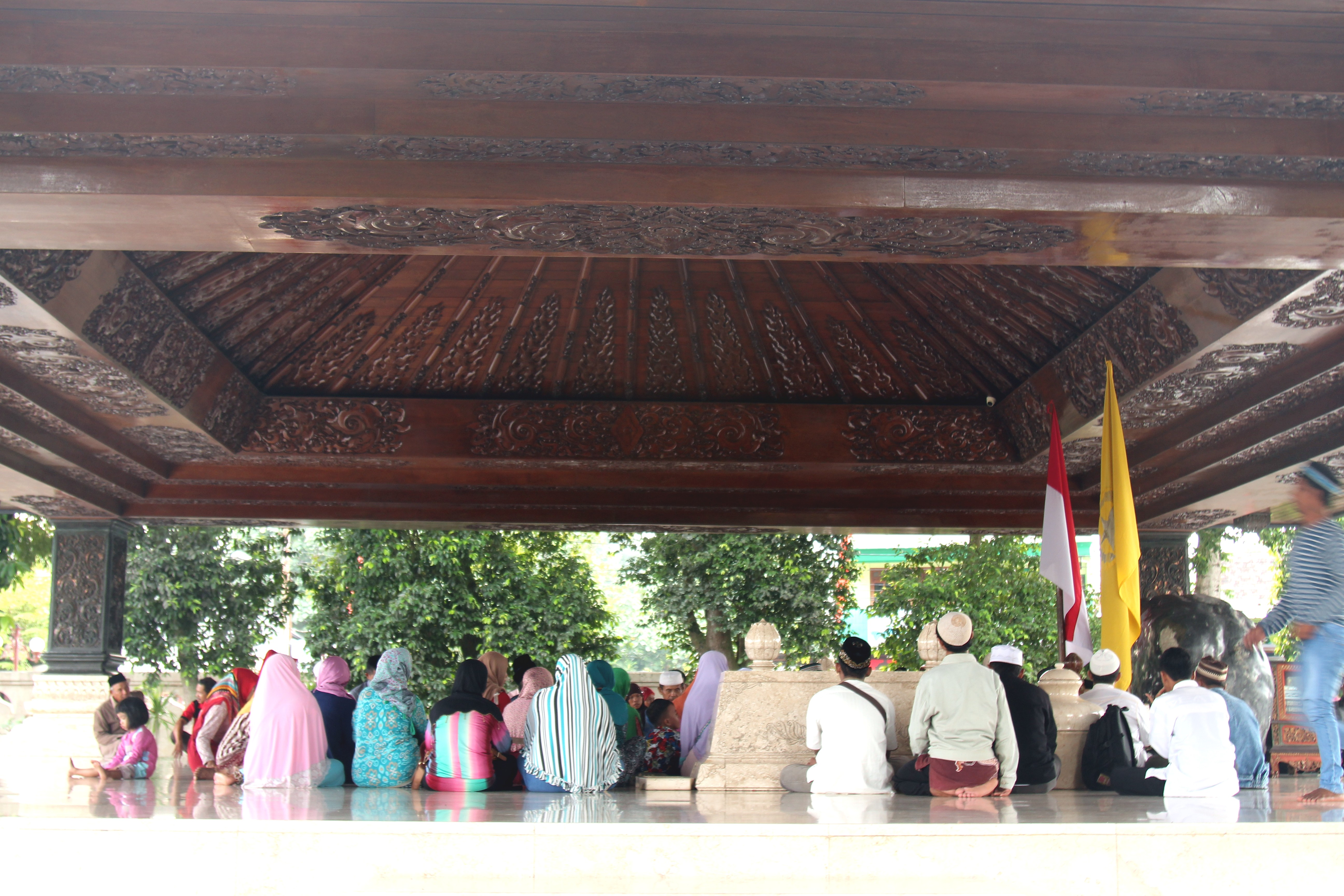
Pilgrims around the grave in 2016

Sukarno's grave presently is a common site for political pilgrimages - many politicians visit the grave prior to announcing their runs for office, including Joko Widodo, Prabowo Subianto and Megawati Sukarnoputri prior to their presidential campaigns in 2014, 2019 and 2004, respectively. It was estimated in 2015 that the number of "political pilgrims" to Sukarno's grave numbered between 400 and 500 thousand every year.

The second type of visitors to the grave are spiritual pilgrims, primarily Muslims. Although veneration of the dead is often considered blasphemy within Islam, there is strong Javanese tradition of visiting "holy men" graves (such as the Wali Sanga), and tens of thousands of Javanese Muslims visit Sukarno's grave each year in order to obtain his spiritual blessing. It is also a popular tourism destination. There is also an annual tradition for the Commander of the Indonesian National Armed Forces to visit the grave annually on each 18 September, the anniversary date for the TNI.

As of 2019, Blitar's tourism agency recorded around 1,500 visits to the grave on average each day, reaching up to 5,000 daily visitors on school holidays. The site has been a significant driver for the local economy due to the number of tourists it generates. Since 2017, the municipal government has been charging Rp 3,000 (~US$0.2) in entry fees per visitor, their vehicles excluded. Following a drop due to the COVID-19 pandemic, the city's tourism agency recorded 250 thousand visits to the grave complex in 2022.

== Design ==
The entire burial complex is located on 1.8 hectares of land and is divided into three areas: the courtyard, terrace and the mausoleum, symbolizing Javanese beliefs in stages of life (prenatal, life and death). Sukarno's grave itself is located next to his parents', and a black epitaph (Note: Written on the epitaph: "Disini dimakamkan Bung Karno, Proklamator Kemerdekaan Dan Presiden Pertama Republik Indonesia. Penyambung Lidah Rakyat Indonesia". In English: "Here lies Bung Karno, independence proclamator and the first President of Indonesia, Mouthpiece of the Indonesian People".) commemorating his career is placed behind his gravestone. The complex also has a library and a museum which were built in 2004, in addition to statues and reliefs depicting Sukarno's life. The mausoleum itself was 51 feet (16 m) tall, and had a three-tiered copper roof of Javanese design. At the time of its construction, the mausoleum had cost US$395,000 to build.

== See also ==
- Astana Giribangun
