= Herman Salzwedel =

Dutch East Indian photographer

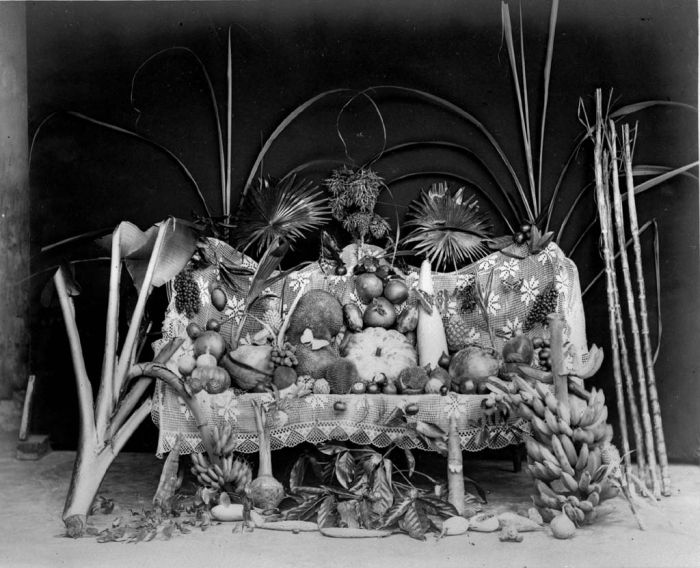
Tropical produce still life photograph

Carl Julius Herman Salzwedel (fl. 1877–1904) was a photographer in Java, Dutch East Indies during the late 19th century. He photographed people and architectural subjects. In the 1870s he partnered with Isidore van Kinsbergen at a portrait studio in Surabaya. Salzwedel then established his own successful studio in the city in 1879. Along with Charls & Van Es & Co (1884–1912) and O. Kurkdjian & Co (1888–1936), it was one of the best known photography studios in the city.

== Career ==
In May 1877, Salzwedel arrived in Batavia, Dutch East Indies, via Singapore. He founded the firm Salzwedel and from March 1878 worked for a year with the more experienced Van Kinsbergen in the photographic studio Kinsbergen & Salzwedel in Batavia.

On May 8, 1879, Salzwedel opened his own studio in the central Boeboetan district of Surabaya. The following year he moved to Pasar Besar street. By the mid-1880s Salzwedel sold the studio and his negatives to Wilhelm H.C. Schmedes. The business remained under his name as he departed the Dutch East Indies. Schmedes had been employed by the Batavian studio of Woodbury & Page as a traveling photographer. Schmedes opened additional Salzwedel studio branches on Sulawesi (1885; led by E. Schlüter), in Medan on Sumatra in 1886, and in Makassar, Sulawesi (1887; led by Adolph Helm). Helm took charge of the studio in Surabaya when Schmedes was on a trip to Europe from 1888 to late 1889.

Salzwedel returned to Java in 1893 and worked as an itinerant photographer. In October 1899 he married Marianne Tinawy in Blitar, East Java. Meanwhile, Schmedes had sold the Salzwedel studio on May 31, 1894, to Henrich Wilhelm Adrian Versnel (1869, Surabaya – 1906), who had been an assistant photographer. He gave a collection of photographs to departing Pasuruan Resident André Salmon. He expanded and modernized the studio in 1900, registering it as a limited company, before going bankrupt in 1901. Versnel started a new studio in Surabaya in June 1903, this time calling it Zalswedel as Herman Salzwedel himself had opened a new studio of his own in Toendjoengan. Salzwedel appears in the Dutch Indies address book of 1904 as a photographer living in Blitar.

Upon Versnel's death in April 1906, Carl F.G.J. Ahrenhold (c.1877, Hanover – 1933, Surabaya) and W.C. Bekuik (Bekink?) acquired the business. In September 1909 they opened the new Zalswedel studio in Toendjoengan. It closed in 1913. Ahrenhold started another studio called "Pasar Besar Photo American Automatic" for cheap portraits.

== Gallery ==
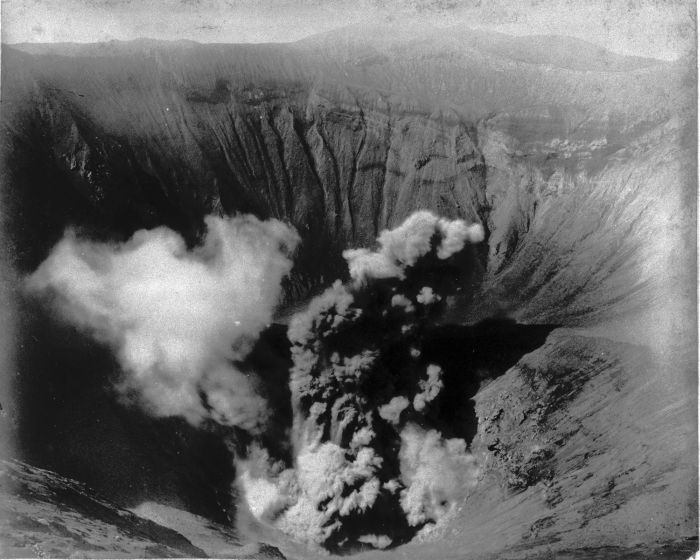
Mount Bromo crater

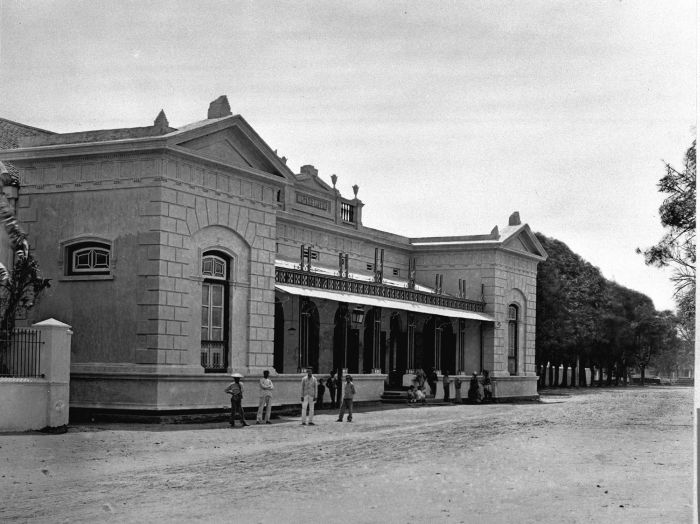
Military canteen in Surabaya

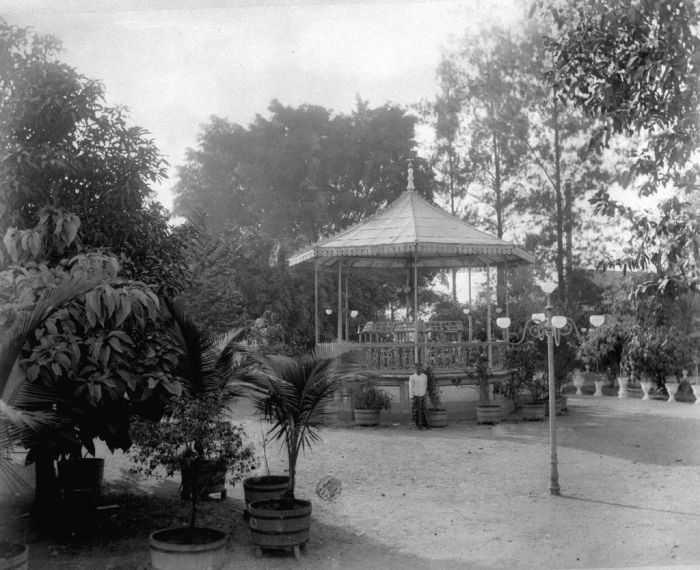
Bandstand in "Stadstuin", Surabaya

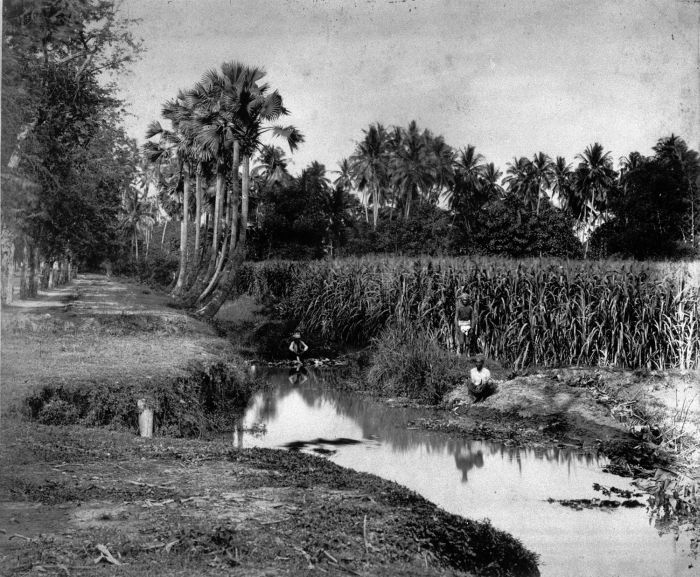
Javanese men in a sugarcane field

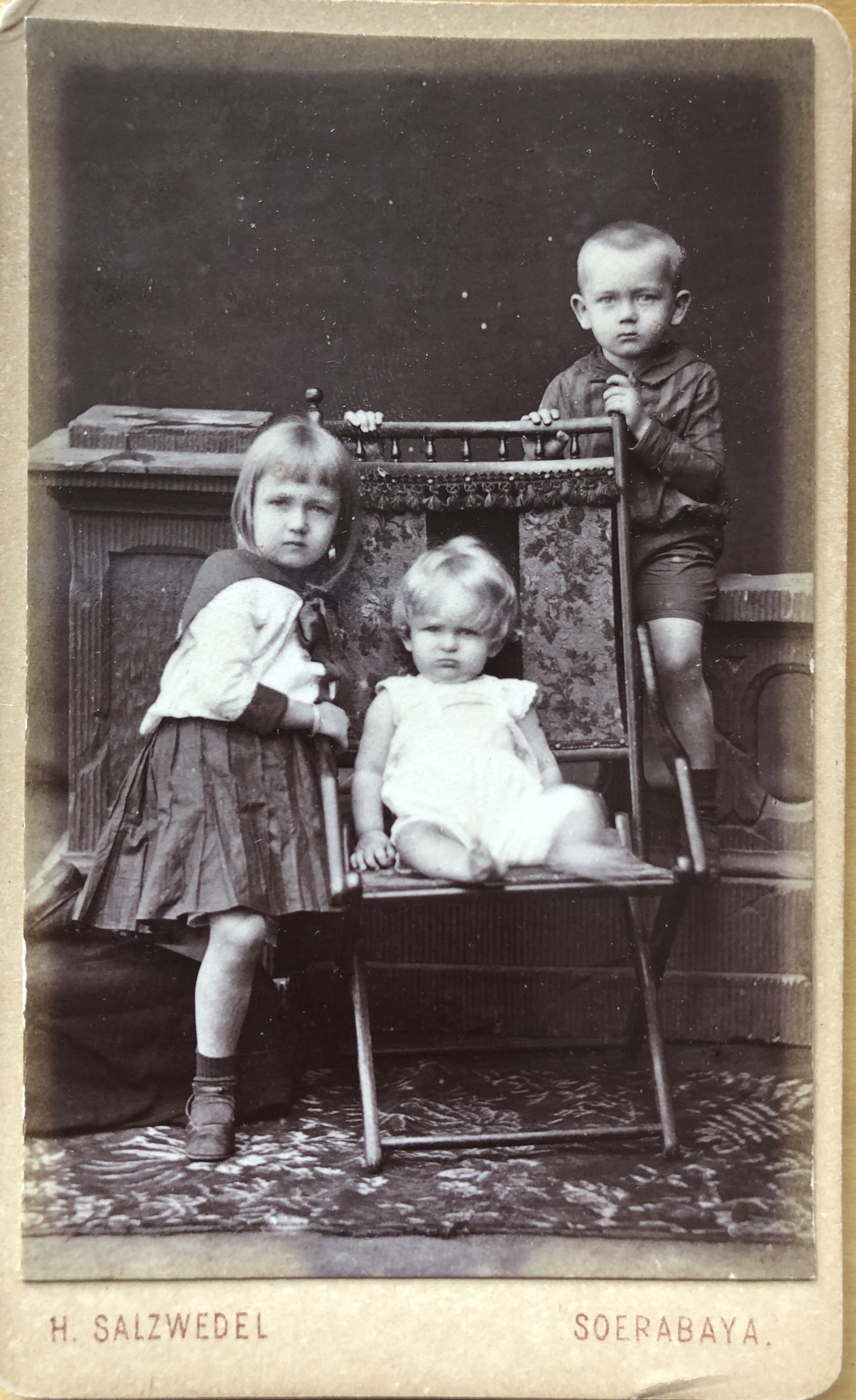
Chilrdren's portrait in Surabaya studio
