= Blitar =

City in East Java, Indonesia

- City
- City of Blitar; Kota Blitar

Other transcription(s)
  - Javanese: Kutha Blitar (Gêdrig) كوڟا بليتار (Pégon) ꦏꦸꦛꦧ꧀ꦭꦶꦠꦂ (Hånåcåråkå)
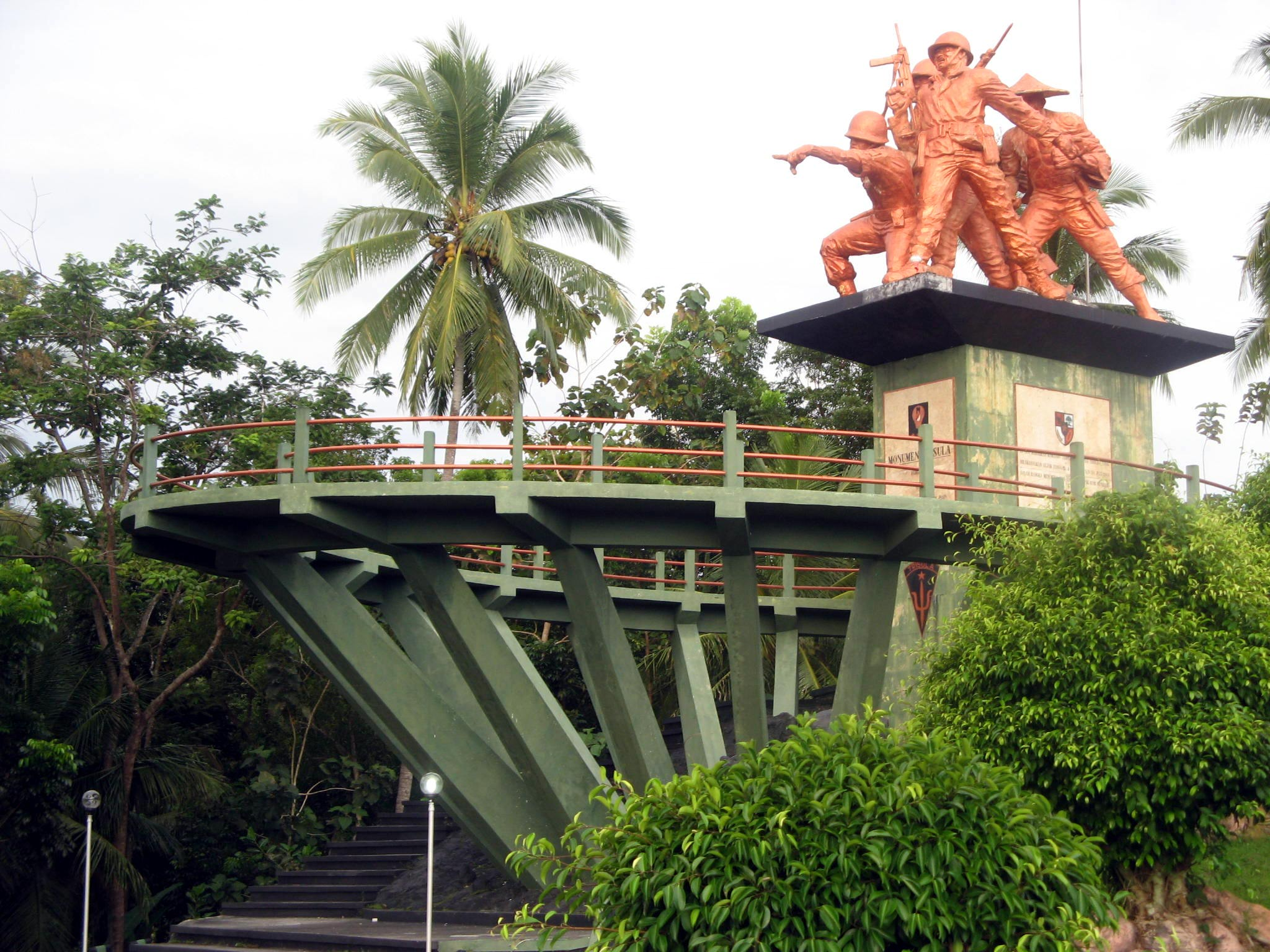
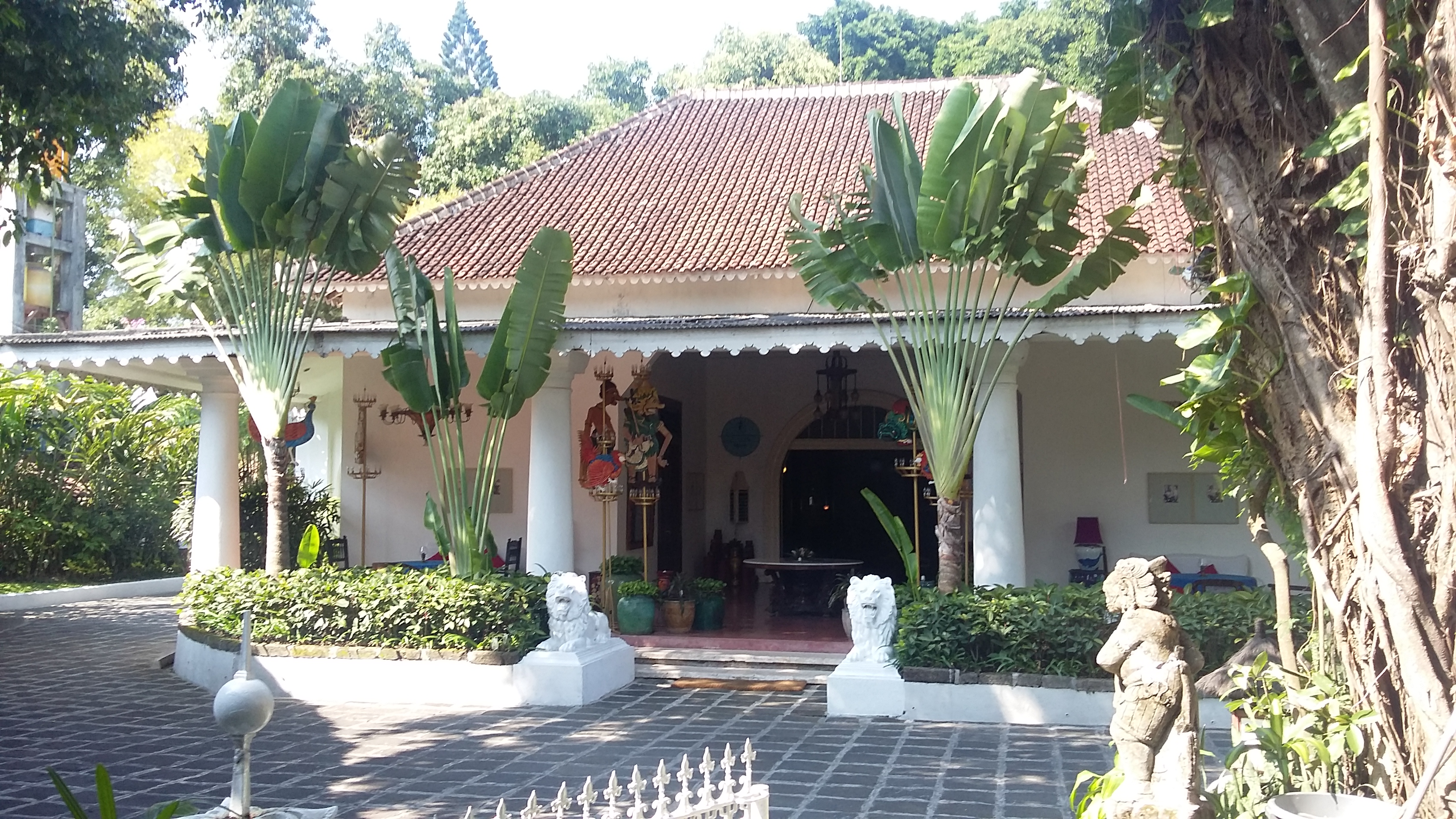
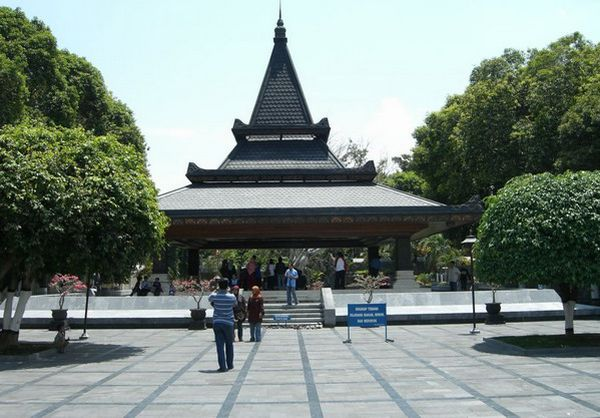
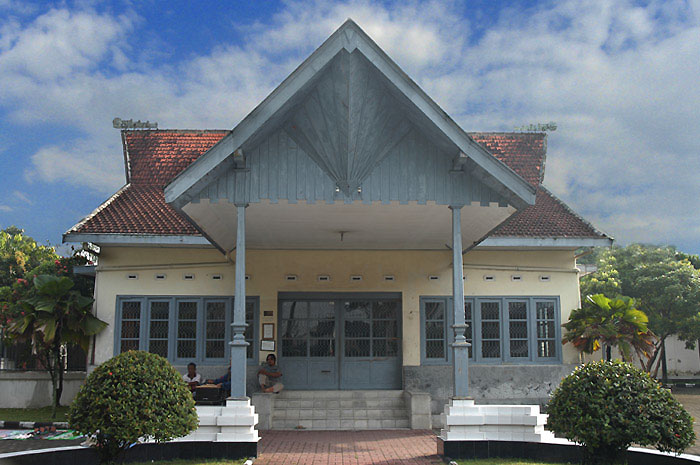
- Clockwise from top left: Trisula Monument, Hotel Tugu, Sukarno Mausoleum, Istana Gebang

- Coat of arms
- Motto: Kridha Hangudi Jaya (Old Javanese) ꦏꦿꦶꦝꦲꦔꦸꦢꦶꦗꦪ (Working hard to build success)
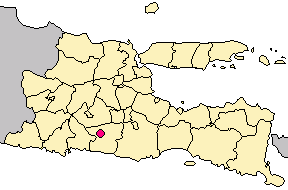
- Location within East Java

- Location in Java and Indonesia Blitar (Indonesia)
- Coordinates: 8°06′S 112°09′E
- Country: Indonesia
- Province: East Java
- City: April 1, 1906 (age 120)

Government
  - Mayor: Syauqul Muhibbin
  - Vice Mayor: Elim Tyu Samba

Area
  - Total: 33.20 km^{2} (12.82 sq mi)
- Elevation: 167 m (548 ft)

Population (mid 2025 estimate)
  - Total: 161,906
  - Density: 4,877/km^{2} (12,630/sq mi)
- Time zone: UTC+7 (Indonesia Western Time)
- Postcode: 66100
- Area code: (+62) 342
- Vehicle registration: AG
- Website: blitarkota.go.id

Blitar is a city in East Java, Indonesia, about 73 km from Malang and 167 km from Surabaya. The area lies within longitude 111° 40' – 112° 09' East and its latitude is 8° 06' South. The city of Blitar lies at an altitude on average 167 metres above sea level, and is an enclave within Blitar Regency which surrounds the city on all sides. It covers an area of 33.20 km^{2}, and had a population of 131,968 at the 2010 Census and 149,149 at the 2020 Census; the official estimate as of mid 2025 was 161,906 (comprising 80,660 males and 81,246 females).

The city is notable as the location of the Grave of Sukarno the first president of Indonesia and one of the nation's founding fathers, five kilometers from the city plaza. The Istana Gebang (Gebang Palace), where Sukarno lived as a child, is nearby and has been converted into a museum containing numerous items commemorating Sukarno's place in Indonesian history.

Blitar city is surrounded by four of the districts (kecamatan) of Blitar Regency - Kademangan, Garum, Nglegok and Sanankulon; added to the population of the city, this combined area of seven kecamatan had a total population in mid 2025 of 438,696 within its area of 318.93 km^{2}.> The very active Kelud volcano is located just over 20 kilometers north of Blitar.

== Administrative districts ==
Blitar city is divided into three districts (kecamatan), tabulated below with their areas and their population totals from the 2010 census and the 2020 census, together with the official estimates as of mid 2025. The table also includes the locations of the district administrative centres, the number of villages (urban kelurahan) in each district, and its postal codes.

Kode Wilayah	Name of District (kecamatan)	Area in km^{2}	Pop'n census 2010	Pop'n census 2020	Pop'n estimate mid 2025	Admin centre	No. of villages	Post codes
35.72.02	Sukorejo	10.13	44,043	51,998	55,270	Sukorejo	7	66121 - 66126
35.72.01	Kepanjenkidul	10.43	38,715	41,679	46,147	Bendo	7	66113 - 66117
35.72.03	Sawanwetan	12.65	49,210	55,472	60,489	Sawanwetan	7	66133 - 66137
	Totals	33.20	131,968	149,149	161,906	Kepanjenkidul	21	

The names of the kelurahan in each district are:

- Sukorejo: Blitar, Karangsari, Sukorejo, Pakunden, Tanjungsari, Turi, Tlumpu
- Kepanjenkidul: Bendo, Kauman, Kepanjenkidul, Kepanjenlor, Ngadirejo, Sentul, Tanggung
- Sawanwetan: Bendogerit, Gedog, Karangtengah, Klampok, Plosokerep, Rembang, Sananwetan

== Local economic governance ==
Based on the survey conducted between August 2010 and January 2011, Blitar was rated number one in Indonesia for local economic governance, being considered particularly good in infrastructure, the interaction between local administrations and businesses, business licensing, and regional head capacity and integrity.

== Sukarno's Mausoleum ==
It is located at Bendogerit village, in Sunanwetan district, about 2 kilometres from Blitar city.

The tomb is built in East Javanese "Joglo" architectural pattern, and combined with Gateway of Bentar. The mausoleum is 51 feet high, with a copper roof of a three-tier building. Underneath, Sukarno's plot is flanked by that of his mother and father. A stone of black andesite bears the inscription, "Here lies Bung Karno, proclaimer of independence, first president of Indonesia." Beside the main building of the tomb, the graveyard complex has Gapura Agung (The Great Gate), Mosque, halls, parks, a rest-area, and a parking place.

The tomb is opened to the public, attracts a large number of visitors, both domestic and international. About 1.5 million people visit the tomb annually.

== University in Blitar ==
- Nahdlatul Ulama University of Blitar
- Balitar Islamic University
- Kesuma Negara College of Economics (STIEKEN)
- PGRI Blitar Teacher Training and Education College (STKIP PGRI Blitar)
- Patria Husada College of Health Sciences (STIKES Patria Husada)
- Indonesian Tax Management Academy (AMPINDO)
- Putra Sang Fajar Blitar State Community Academy (AKN Putra Sang Fajar)

== People from Blitar ==
Bathing place near Temple Panataran, near Blitar

- Boediono, former vice president of Indonesia.
- Admiral Agus Suhartono, former commander-in-chief of the Indonesian military.
- Livi Zheng, film producer and director
- Charis Yulianto, footballer
- Nitya Krishinda Maheswari, badminton athlete
- Wiweko Soepono, inventor and director/pilot of Garuda Indonesia
- Anjasmara, actor
- Anthony Fokker, aviation pioneer
- Sukadji Ranuwihardjo, academic
- Anas Urbaningrum, politician
- Imam Munandar, politician
- Masjchun Sofwan, politician
- Sukarni, politician
- Agus Suhartono, military leader
- Putri Raemawasti, beauty queen, Puteri Indonesia 2007
- Hardi, painter

== Climate ==
Blitar has a tropical monsoon climate (Köppen Am) with moderate to little rainfall from June to October and heavy rainfall from November to May.

Climate data for Blitar
Month	Jan	Feb	Mar	Apr	May	Jun	Jul	Aug	Sep	Oct	Nov	Dec	Year
Mean daily maximum °C (°F)	28.8 (83.8)	28.9 (84.0)	29.2 (84.6)	29.5 (85.1)	29.6 (85.3)	29.8 (85.6)	29.6 (85.3)	30.0 (86.0)	30.7 (87.3)	30.9 (87.6)	30.0 (86.0)	29.3 (84.7)	29.7 (85.4)
Daily mean °C (°F)	24.6 (76.3)	24.7 (76.5)	24.9 (76.8)	24.9 (76.8)	24.6 (76.3)	24.3 (75.7)	23.7 (74.7)	23.9 (75.0)	24.6 (76.3)	25.1 (77.2)	25.0 (77.0)	24.8 (76.6)	24.6 (76.3)
Mean daily minimum °C (°F)	20.5 (68.9)	20.6 (69.1)	20.6 (69.1)	20.4 (68.7)	19.7 (67.5)	18.8 (65.8)	17.9 (64.2)	17.9 (64.2)	18.6 (65.5)	19.4 (66.9)	20.0 (68.0)	20.3 (68.5)	19.6 (67.2)
Average rainfall mm (inches)	296 (11.7)	271 (10.7)	265 (10.4)	191 (7.5)	131 (5.2)	81 (3.2)	45 (1.8)	24 (0.9)	32 (1.3)	102 (4.0)	191 (7.5)	283 (11.1)	1,912 (75.3)
Source: Climate-Data.org

== See also ==
- 1945 PETA Revolt in Blitar
- Blitar railway station
