= Eddy Sabara =

Indonesian civil servant and military officer (1927–1995)

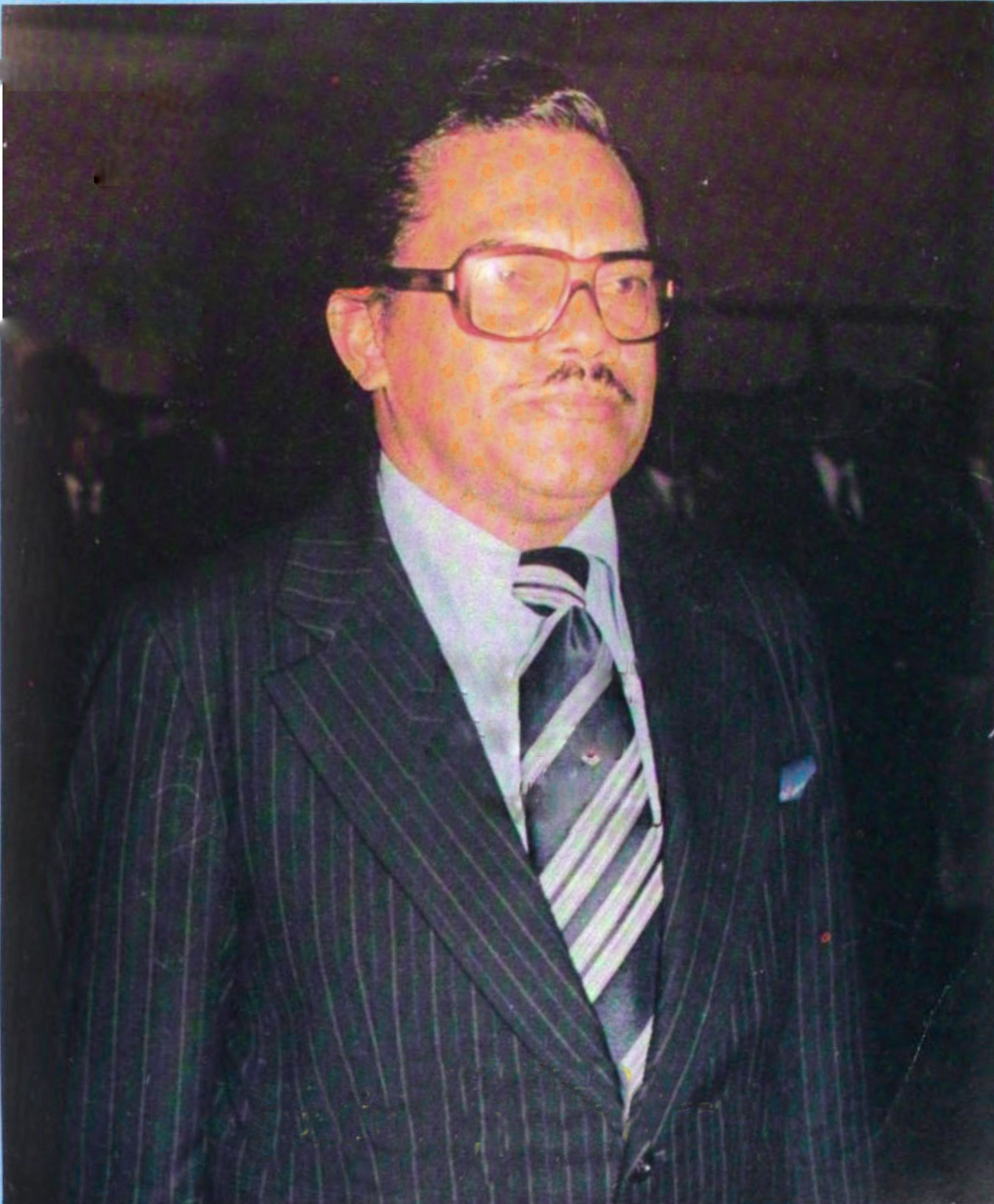
- Sabara, 1979

Governor of Southeast Sulawesi
- In office 14 October 1966 – 23 June 1978
- Preceded by: Laode Hadi
- Succeeded by: Abdullah Silondae

Personal details
- Born: 17 February 1927 Kendari, Southeast Sulawesi
- Died: 30 September 1995 (aged 68)
- Spouse: Emmyria Sabara

Military service
- Allegiance: Indonesia
- Branch/service: Indonesian Army
- Rank: Major general
- Battles/wars: Indonesian National Revolution: Madiun Affair

Eddy Sabara (17 February 1927 – 30 September 1995) was an Indonesian civil servant and military officer. He was the Governor of Southeast Sulawesi for twelve years between 1966 and 1978, and held acting governor positions in four other provinces due to his position in the Ministry of Home Affairs.

== Early life ==
Sabara was born in Kendari, then part of Dutch East Indies, on 17 February 1927. His father was a municipal police officer. Sabara was the last of seven siblings, and he began his education in Kendari before moving to Makassar for further education until 1946, where he attended school with future Indonesian nationalist figure Robert Wolter Monginsidi.

== Career ==
=== Military service ===
After completing his education in Makassar, Sabara joined a group of youths from Sulawesi who left for Java to fight in the Indonesian National Revolution, as the South Sulawesi campaign of Raymond Westerling was raging in Makassar and its vicinity. Once in Java, Sabara joined a battalion in the nationalist government, having been before grown an interest in the military due to watching KNIL drills as a child. In 1948, he was a first lieutenant in command of a reserve company which was about to be deployed to Sulawesi when his unit was attacked and disarmed by Communist militias during the Madiun Affair. Sabara was imprisoned and was apparently about to be executed before Army units from the Siliwangi Division defeated the Communists and freed Sabara's unit. During his time in Java, he also enrolled in the Magelang Military Academy.

After the revolution, he commanded units within the Hasanuddin Military Region, eventually becoming commander of its Regional Training Regiment by 1965. During his time at Hasanuddin, he participated in the campaign against Andi Aziz's rebellion. He had also commanded a reserve brigade during Operation Trikora in 1962.

=== Governor and civil servant ===
On 14 October 1966, he was appointed acting governor of Southeast Sulawesi, before being made full governor for two terms starting in 1967. The previous civilian governor and the first elected governor of the province, La Ode Hadi, was forced to leave his position in 1966 before he had held it for two years following a wave of demonstrations during the transition to the New Order, allowing the popular Sabara (at that time a lieutenant colonel) to take over.

Southeast Sulawesi was very sparsely populated at the start of his tenure, with little to no government budget, and Sabara opted to relocate locals (mostly nomadic farmers) alongside resettlement areas where roads were planned. According to Sabara in a 1983 interview with Tempo, his wife initially believed that his appointment to Southeast Sulawesi was an exile of sorts. He also drew in migrants from densely populated Java and Bali. Despite a lack of existing traffic at the time, he lobbied for the central government to fund key roads, especially between Kendari and Kolaka, believing that the road would attract agricultural settlers. During his governorship, he also served in the People's Consultative Assembly as a regional representative.

He was initially intended to serve just one term, and after its expiry in 1973 a lack of replacement candidates resulted in his term initially being extended by several months, and later a second term. After the conclusion of his governorship in 1978, he was assigned in 1979 to the Ministry of Home Affairs as inspector general, and later became the director general of the ministry's regional autonomy directorate. During his time there, he became acting governors for Jambi (1979), Central Sulawesi (25 November 1980 – 1981), and Aceh (15 March – 27 August 1981), During his temporary governorships of Aceh and Central Sulawesi, he had encountered political gridlocks in the provincial legislatures during their attempt to appoint a definitive governor.

On 27 October 1981, he was also again appointed acting governor of Southeast Sulawesi, the eighth time he was sworn in as Governor. Afterwards, he was once more appointed acting governor of Central Kalimantan (7 October 1983 – 23 January 1984). Due to this track record, he was known by journalists as being the "acting governor specialist" in the early 1980s. During his time in the ministry, he also revived the deputy governor position, based on his own experience as governor where a lack of a deputy often caused issues especially with the provincial legislature. He was awarded the Star of Mahaputera, 3rd class (Bintang Mahaputera Utama) on 14 August 1982. In 1984, he was also appointed into the Supreme Advisory Council.

He died on 30 September 1995, due to his heart disease and kidney-related complications. He was buried at the Kalibata Heroes' Cemetery. At the time of his death, he held the rank of major general.
