= Mayor of Pasuruan =

- Wali Kota Pasuruan
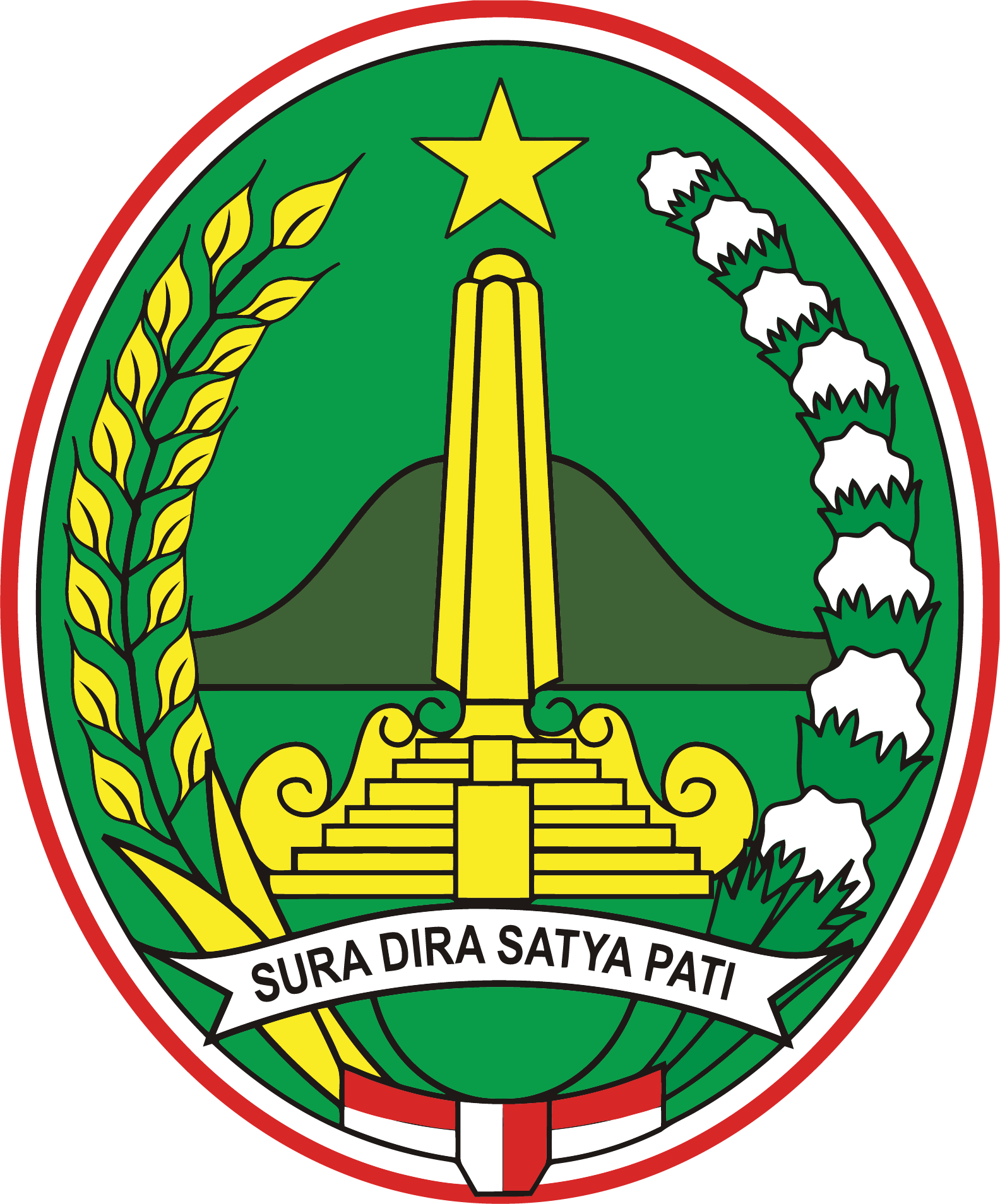
- Coat of arms of Pasuruan

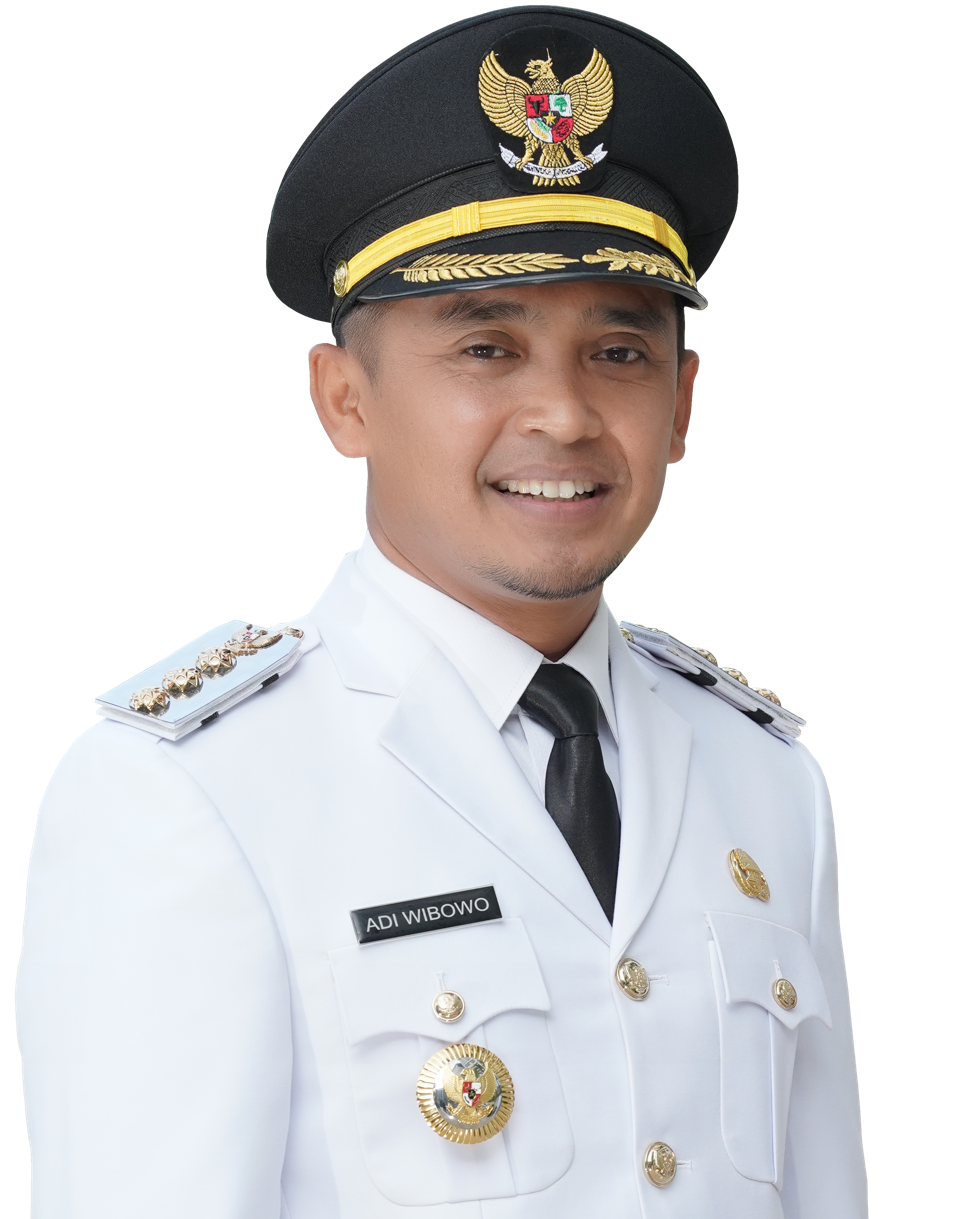
- Incumbent; Adi Wibowo since 24 December 2024
- Term length: 5 years
- Inaugural holder: Henri Edmund Boissevain
- Formation: 1928
- Website: pasuruankota.go.id

Mayor of Pasuruan is the head of the second-level region who holds the government in Pasuruan together with the vice mayor and 30 members of the Pasuruan City Regional House of Representatives. The mayor and vice mayor of Pasuruan are elected through general elections held every 5 years. The first mayor of Pasuruan was Mr. Henri Edmund Boissevain, who governed the city during the Dutch colonisation period from 1928 to 1934.

== List ==
The following is a definitive list of Mayors of Pasuruan since 1928 during the Dutch East Indies era until now under the Government of the Republic of Indonesia.

Dutch East Indies Period
Num.	Portrait	Mayor	Beginning of office	End of Term	Political Party / Faction	Period	Note.	Vice mayor
1		Henri Edmund Boissevain	1928	1934	Independent	1	Burgemeester	N/A
2		W. C. Krijgsman	1934	1936	Independent	2	Assistant Resident of Pasuruan/Burgemeester	N/A
3		Dr. C. G. E. de Jong	1936	1939	Independent	3	Assistant Resident of Pasuruan/Burgemeester	N/A
4		L. A. Busselaar	1939	1941	Independent	4	Assistant Resident of Pasuruan/Burgemeester	N/A
5		F. van Mourik	1941	1942	Independent	5	Assistant Resident of Pasuruan/Burgemeester	N/A
Japanese Occupation Period
Num.	Portrait	Mayor	Beginning of office	End of Term	Political Party / Faction	Period	Note.	Vice mayor
1		R. Tumenggung Ario Hoepodio	1 May 1942	1945	Independent	6		N/A
Mayor of Pasuruan
Num.	Portrait	Mayor	Beginning of office	End of Term	Political Party / Faction	Period	Note.	Vice mayor
1		R. Soedjono	6 November 1945	1950	Independent	7		N/A
2		Astamoen	13 March 1950	22 August 1950	Independent	8		N/A
3		Wijono	1950	1950	Independent	9		N/A
4		Badroes Sapari	1950	1955	Independent	10		N/A
5		Soetimboel K.	1955	1958	Independent	11		N/A
6		R.I. Abdurachim	1958	1961	Independent	12		N/A
7		Achadoen	1961	1965	Independent	13		N/A
8		R.M. Soekiswo	1965	1967	Independent	14		N/A
9		Soejono	1967	1969	Independent	15		N/A
10		A. Hudan Dardiri	1969	1975	Independent	16		N/A
11		Drs. Harjono	1975	1985	Independent	17		N/A
12		Drs. Suhartono	1985	1990	Independent	18		N/A
13		Drs. H. Irwan Masrur	1990	1995	Independent	19		N/A
14		H. Ambjah; SH. M.Si	1995	2000	Independent	20		N/A
15		H. Aminurokhman; S.E., M.M.	2000	2005	PKB	21		Pudjo Basuki
15		H. Aminurokhman; S.E., M.M.	2005	2010	PKB	22 (2005)		Pudjo Basuki
16		H. Hasani; S.H.	18 October 2010	18 October 2015	PKB	23 (2010)		Setiyono
—		Bahrul Ulum (Daily executive)	18 October 2015	22 October 2015	Independent	—		N/A
—		Wibowo Ekoputro (Acting)	22 October 2015	17 February 2016	Independent	—		N/A
17		Drs. H. Setiyono; M.Si.	17 February 2016	8 October 2018	Golkar	24 (2015)		Raharto Teno Prasetyo
—		Raharto Teno Prasetyo; S.T. (Acting Officer)	8 October 2018	21 September 2020	PDI-P	24 (2015)		N/A
18		Raharto Teno Prasetyo; S.T.	21 September 2020	26 September 2020	PDI-P	24 (2015)		N/A
—		Ardo Sahak (Acting)	26 September 2020	5 December 2020	Independent	24 (2015)	(Note: Replacing Raharto Teno Prasetyo who is on campaign leave to participate in the 2020 Pasuruan mayoral election.)	N/A
(18)		Raharto Teno Prasetyo; S.T.	5 December 2020	17 February 2021	PDI-P	24 (2015)		N/A
—		Anom Surahno (Daily executive)	17 February 2021	26 February 2021	Independent	—	(Note: Filling the vacant position of mayor after Raharto Teno Prasetyo's term of office ended on 17 February 2021.)	N/A
19		Drs. K.H. Saifullah Yusuf; S.I.P.	26 February 2021	11 September 2024	PKB	25 (2020)		Adi Wibowo
20		H. Adi Wibowo; S.T.P., M.Si. (Acting Officer)	12 September 2024	24 September 2024	Golkar	25 (2020)	(Note: As acting officer mayor of Pasuruan, he replaces Saifullah Yusuf who was appointed as Minister of Social Affairs of the Onward Indonesia Cabinet.)	N/A
—		Lilik Pudjiastuti (Acting)	24 September 2024	23 November 2024	Independent	25 (2020)		N/A
(20)		H. Adi Wibowo; S.T.P., M.Si. (Acting Officer)	23 November 2024	24 December 2024	Golkar	25 (2020)		N/A
(20)		Adi Wibowo	24 December 2024	19 February 2025	Golkar	25 (2020)		N/A
(20)		Adi Wibowo	20 February 2025	Incumbent	Golkar	26 (2024)		Mokhamad Nawawi

== See also ==
- Pasuruan
- List of incumbent regional heads and deputy regional heads in East Java
