= Lady Aria =

Indonesia-bred racehorse

- Breed: KP5 (PORDASI classification)
- Sire: Long War
- Grandsire: Lord At War
- Dam: Mahkota Putri Aria
- Damsire: Putra Blandford Park
- Sex: Mare
- Foaled: 30 September 2014
- Country: Indonesia
- Colour: Bay (Jragem)
- Breeder: King Halim Stable
- Owner: Kusnadi Halim
- Jockey: Jemmy Runtu

Major wins
- Tiga Mahkota Seri I (2018); Indonesia Derby (2018)
- Last updated on November 22, 2025

Lady Aria (foaled September 30, 2014 in Pasuruan, East Java) is an Indonesian racehorse. Her major victories include the Tiga Mahkota Seri I (Triple Crown Series I) and Indonesia Derby 2018. However, she finished second in the Tiga Mahkota Seri II, denying her a Triple Crown title.

== Background ==
Lady Aria is a bay mare foaled on September 30, 2014, at King Halim Stable in Pasuruan, East Java. Her sire is Long War, a son of Lord At War, and her dam is Mahkota Putri Aria, a daughter of Putra Blandford Park. Lady Aria's sire, Long War, is known to have a pedigree from the world-famous horse, Secretariat.

Lady Aria's owner is Kusnadi Halim, and she is usually ridden by Jemmy Runtu.

== Racing career ==
Lady Aria is one of Indonesia's most accomplished racehorses, known for her victories in prestigious events. In the 2018 Indonesian Triple Crown series, she won the Tiga Mahkota Seri I (1200 m). However, she finished second in the Tiga Mahkota Seri II (1600 m), beaten by Gagak Lumayung, thus preventing Lady Aria from winning the Indonesian Triple Crown title.

After failing in the Tiga Mahkota Seri II, Lady Aria won the Indonesia Derby (part of the 52nd Kejurnas Pordasi Seri I) in Tegalwaton over a distance of 2000 meters, the final race in the Indonesian Triple Crown series.

In 2020, Lady Aria managed to finish in first place in the Open A class (2000 m) Tiga Mahkota Seri I at Sultan Agung Racecourse, defeating Gagak Lumayung.

== Retirement ==
After her racing career, Lady Aria became a broodmare. She has 2 descendants, a chestnut filly Lady Arion and a bay colt named Clover The King.

== Pedigree ==
Pedigree of Lady Aria (IDN), bay mare, 2014
| Sire Long War (USA) | Lord At War (ARG) | General (FR) | Brigadier Gerard (GB) |
| Sire Long War (USA) | Lord At War (ARG) | General (FR) | Merculiale (FR) |
| Sire Long War (USA) | Lord At War (ARG) | Luna De Miel (ARG) | Con Brio (GB) |
| Sire Long War (USA) | Lord At War (ARG) | Luna De Miel (ARG) | Good Will (ARG) |
| Sire Long War (USA) | Lady Windborne (USA) | Secretariat (USA) | Bold Ruler (USA) |
| Sire Long War (USA) | Lady Windborne (USA) | Secretariat (USA) | Somethingroyal (USA) |
| Sire Long War (USA) | Lady Windborne (USA) | Priceless Gem (USA) | Hail To Reason (USA) |
| Sire Long War (USA) | Lady Windborne (USA) | Priceless Gem (USA) | Searching (USA) |
| Dam Mahkota Putri Aria (IDN) | Putra Blandford Park (IDN) | Blandford Park (USA) | Little Current (USA) |
| Dam Mahkota Putri Aria (IDN) | Putra Blandford Park (IDN) | Blandford Park (USA) | Green Finger (USA |
| Dam Mahkota Putri Aria (IDN) | Putra Blandford Park (IDN) | Isle Of Enz (AUS) | Islero (NZ) |
| Dam Mahkota Putri Aria (IDN) | Putra Blandford Park (IDN) | Isle Of Enz (AUS) | Enz (AUS) |
| Dam Mahkota Putri Aria (IDN) | Aria Missoni (IDN) | Juragan Tanjungsari (AUS) | — |
| Dam Mahkota Putri Aria (IDN) | Aria Missoni (IDN) | Juragan Tanjungsari (AUS) | — |
| Dam Mahkota Putri Aria (IDN) | Aria Missoni (IDN) | Nona Joice (IDN) | Frence Deal (IDN) |
| Dam Mahkota Putri Aria (IDN) | Aria Missoni (IDN) | Nona Joice (IDN) | Happy Day (IDN) |
