= Lady Arion =

Indonesia-bred racehorse

- Breed: KP6 (Pordasi classification)
- Sire: Maksimilian
- Grandsire: Almuinjjid
- Dam: Lady Aria
- Damsire: Long War
- Sex: Filly
- Foaled: October 15, 2022
- Country: Indonesia
- Colour: Chestnut (Napas)
- Breeder: King Halim Stable
- Owner: Kusnadi Halim
- Trainer: Karlan
- Jockey: Hanny Suoth
- Record: 1: 1-0-0
- Earnings: Rp. 15.000.000

Major wins
- Kejurnas Pacuan Kuda Pordasi Ke-59 Seri II (2025)

Lady Arion (foaled October 15, 2022 in Pasuruan, East Java) is a racehorse from Indonesia. She is the offspring of 2018 Indonesia Derby winner Lady Aria.

== Background ==
Lady Arion is a chestnut filly foaled on October 15 at King Halim Stable in Pasuruan, East Java. Sired by Maksimilian, a son of Almuinjjid, and her dam is Lady Aria, winner of the 2018 Indonesia Derby and the Piala Tiga Mahkota 1 (Triple Crown Series 1) 2020 in the Open A class.

Lady Arion is currently trained by Karlan and is ridden by Hanny Suoth.

== Racing career ==
=== 2025: three-year-old season ===
Lady Arion made her debut on 19 October 2025 at Sultan Agung Racecourse in Bantul, Special Region of Yogyakarta, competing in the 1200m 3-Year-Old Maiden Class. She won the first place in 1.200-meter race under jockey Hanny Suoth.

==== Racing form ====
The data below are mostly based on information available on livestreams from the YouTube channel and website of Sarga. Co, the main company that organizes and manages professional horseracing tournaments in Indonesia.

Date	Racecourse	Race	Class	Distance	Entry	HN	Finished	Time	Jockey	Winner (2nd place)
Oct 19, 2025	Sultan Agung	Kejurnas Series II	3YO Debut	1200 M		1	1st		Hanny Suoth	(Melody Hosana)

== Pedigree ==
Pedigree of Lady Arion (IDN), chestnut filly, 2022
Sire Maksimilian (IDN)	Almuinjjid (USA)	Blushing Groom (FR)	Red God (USA)
Sire Maksimilian (IDN)	Almuinjjid (USA)	Blushing Groom (FR)	Runaway Bride (GB)
Sire Maksimilian (IDN)	Almuinjjid (USA)	Herb Wine (USA)	Full Pocket (USA)
Sire Maksimilian (IDN)	Almuinjjid (USA)	Herb Wine (USA)	Harbor Wine (USA)
Sire Maksimilian (IDN)	Honestly (USA)	Meadowlake (USA)	Hold Your Peace (USA)
Sire Maksimilian (IDN)	Honestly (USA)	Meadowlake (USA)	Suspicious Native (USA)
Sire Maksimilian (IDN)	Honestly (USA)	Blunt (USA)	Rounders (GB)
Sire Maksimilian (IDN)	Honestly (USA)	Blunt (USA)	No Tip (USA)
Dam Lady Aria (IDN)	Long War (USA)	Lord At War (ARG)	General (FR)
Dam Lady Aria (IDN)	Long War (USA)	Lord At War (ARG)	Luna del Miel (ARG)
Dam Lady Aria (IDN)	Long War (USA)	Lady Winborne (USA)	Secretariat (USA)
Dam Lady Aria (IDN)	Long War (USA)	Lady Winborne (USA)	Priceless Gem (USA)
Dam Lady Aria (IDN)	Mahkota Putri Aria (IDN)	Putra Blandford Park (USA)	Blandford Park (USA)
Dam Lady Aria (IDN)	Mahkota Putri Aria (IDN)	Putra Blandford Park (USA)	Isle Of Enz (AUS)
Dam Lady Aria (IDN)	Mahkota Putri Aria (IDN)	Aria Missoni (IDN)	Juragan Tanjungsari (AUS)
Dam Lady Aria (IDN)	Mahkota Putri Aria (IDN)	Aria Missoni (IDN)	Nona Joice (IDN)
