= Pasuruan City Regional House of Representatives =

Pasuruan City Regional House of Representatives Dewan Perwakilan Rakyat Daerah Kota Pasuruan
- 2024–2029 period

Type
- Type: Unicameral
- Term limits: 5 years

History
- New session started: 30 August 2024

Leadership
- Speaker: M. Toyib, S.H., Golkar since 9 October 2024
- 1st Vice Speaker: H. Ismail Marzuki Hasan, S.E., PKB since 9 October 2024
- 2nd Vice Speaker: Muhammad Gatot Adidoyo, PDI-P since 9 October 2024

Structure
- Seats: 30
- Political groups: PDI-P (3) NasDem (1) PKB (8) Hanura (2) PAN (1) Golkar (9) PPP (2) Gerindra (1) PKS (3)

Elections
- Voting system: Open list
- Last election: 14 February 2024

Meeting place
- Pasuruan City Regional House of Representatives Building; Balai Kota Street Number 11; Kandangsapi, Panggungrejo, Pasuruan; East Java, Indonesia

Website
- pasuruankota.go.id/dprd-kota-pasuruan/

The Pasuruan City Regional House of Representatives (Indonesian: Dewan Perwakilan Rakyat Daerah Kota Pasuruan, DPRD Kota Pasuruan) is the unicameral municipal legislature of Pasuruan, East Java, Indonesia. It has 30 members, who are elected every five years, simultaneously with the national legislative election.

== Legal basis ==
The legislature for Pasuruan was formed along with those of other cities in East Java under Law Number 17 of 1950, which organized city governments within the province.

== General election results ==
=== 2024 Indonesian legislative election ===
The official valid votes received by political parties contesting the 2024 Indonesian legislative election in each electoral district (constituency) for members of the Pasuruan City Regional House of Representatives are as follows.

2024 Indonesian legislative election results

Electoral district	PKB	Gerindra	PDI-P	Golkar	NasDem	Labour	Gelora	PKS	PKN	Hanura	Garuda	PAN	PBB	Democratic	PSI	Perindo	PPP	Ummat	Valid votes
Pasuruan City 1	11,667	601	4,256	8,964	1,521	204	1,115	2,953	88	2,007	0	1,161	60	1,055	100	37	3,701	41	39,531
Pasuruan City 2	7,021	409	867	3,629	1,191	101	275	2,058	106	2,484	0	787	25	328	54	18	281	45	19,679
Pasuruan City 3	8,558	2,675	5,654	7,971	2,178	219	118	4,269	44	1,582	0	2,042	117	382	82	34	1,135	101	37,161
Pasuruan City 4	4,848	1,693	3,572	11,879	438	129	105	2,486	7	1,715	0	162	10	166	106	25	2,352	16	29,709
Total	32,094	5,378	14,349	32,443	5,328	653	1,613	11,766	245	7,788	0	4,152	212	1,931	342	114	7,469	203	126,080
Source: General Elections Commission of Indonesia

== Composition ==
The following is the composition of members of the Pasuruan City Regional House of Representatives in the last four periods.

Party	Total seats			
Party	2009–2014	2014–2019	2019–2024	2024–2029
PKB seats	7	▲10	▼8	8
Gerindra seats	0	▲2	▲3	▼1
PDI-P seats	4	▼3	▼2	▲3
Golkar seats	3	▲5	▲7	▲9
NasDem seats		2	▼1	1
PKS seats	2	▲3	3	3
Hanura seats	2	2	▲3	▼2
PAN seats	1	▲2	2	▼1
Demokrat seats	3	▼0	0	0
PPP seats	3	▼1	1	▲2
Total Seats	25	▲30	30	30
Total Party	8	▲9	9	9

== Electoral District ==
In the 2019 Legislative Election and the 2024 Legislative Election, the Pasuruan City Regional House of Representatives election was divided into 4 electoral districts as follows:

Electoral District Name	Electoral District Area	Number of Seats
PASURUAN CITY 1	Panggungrejo	10
PASURUAN CITY 2	Bugul Kidul	4
PASURUAN CITY 3	Purworejo	9
PASURUAN CITY 4	Gadingrejo	7
TOTAL		30

== See also ==
- East Java Regional House of Representatives
- Pasuruan
- East Java
