= Pasoeroean Stoomtram Maatschappij =

Pasoeroean Stoomtram Maatschappij, N.V.
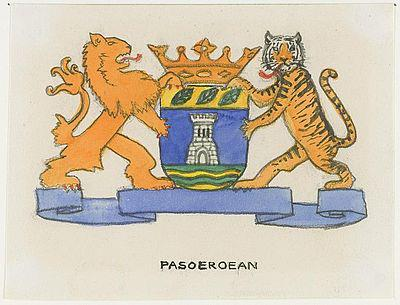

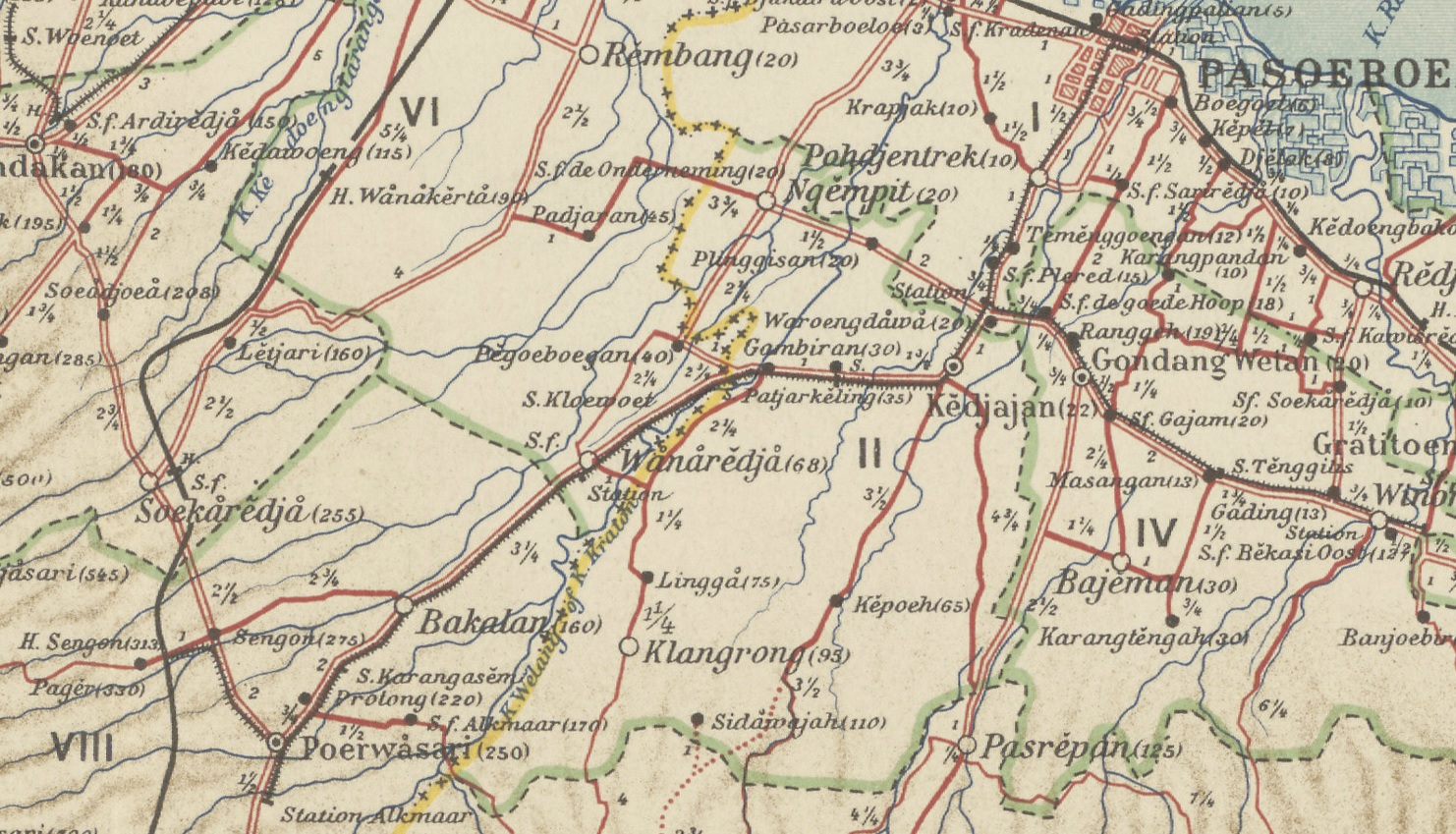

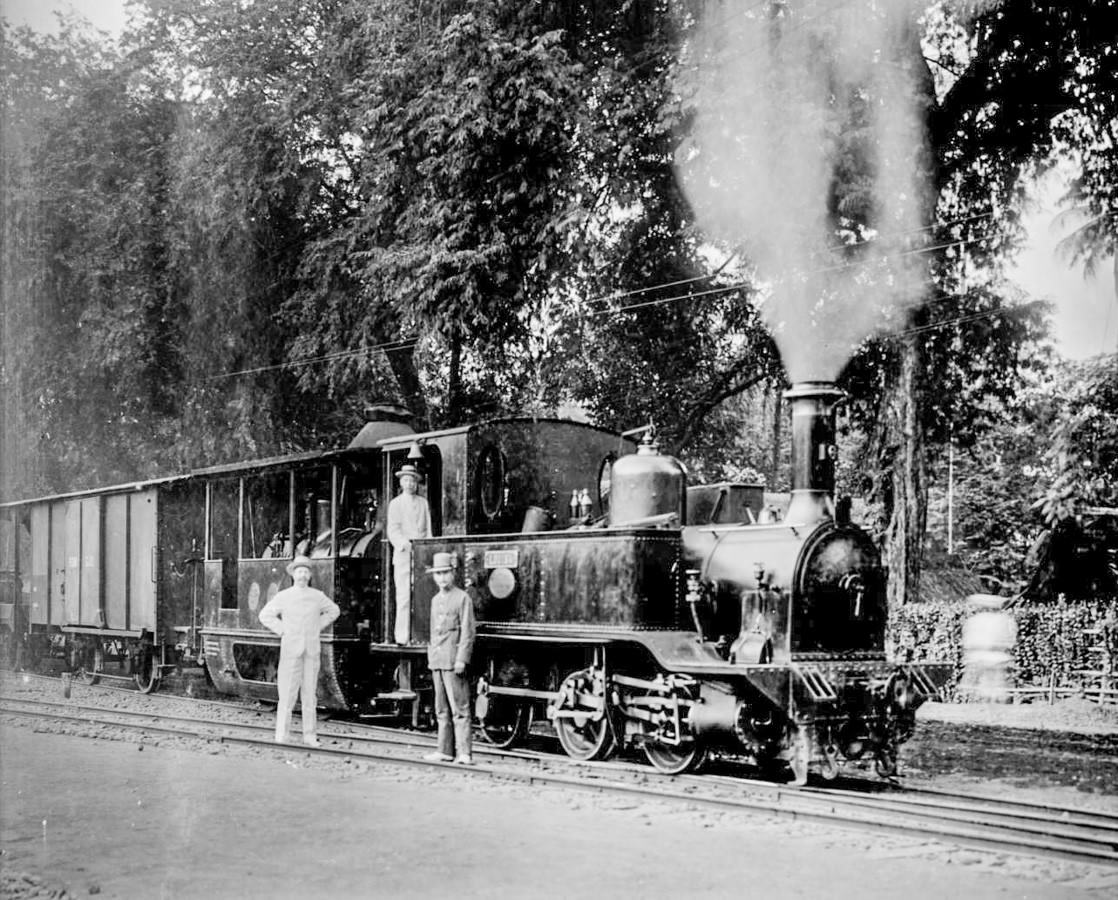
- PsSM's freight train with coupled Hohenzollern PsSM (?) B16 tram engine-Cockerill PsSM 6/ C2201 Louisa, ca 1910

Overview
- Headquarters: Pasuruan, East Java, Dutch East Indies
- Locale: Pasuruan
- Dates of operation: 1896–1988
- Successor: Kereta Api Indonesia

Technical
- Track gauge: 1,067 mm (3 ft 6 in)
- Length: 48.5 kilometres (30.1 mi)

The Pasoeroean Stoomtram Maatschappij, N.V. (PsSM, Dutch for Pasuruan Steam Tram Company) was a private tramway in Pasuruan on the Dutch East Indies (now East Java, Indonesia). It served passenger transport as well as goods transport of agricultural products such as sugarcane, tea and tobacco.

== History ==
After Surabaya−Bangil−Pasuruan had been connected by Staatsspoorwegen railway line on May 16, 1878. There was a private investor who was interested in building a rail lineto connect the rural part of Pasuruan to the port area. The Pasoeroean Stoomtram Maatschappij (PsSM) was founded officially in 1895 based on Notarial Deed of H. W. F. Ligtenberg at 's Gravenhage (The Hague) on March, 14th also Koninklijk Besluit No.19 on March 5, 1895, operating as a tram company, proposed to the Government of the Dutch East Indies the construction of a rail network to solved the transport problems of the sugar mills and crops in the Pasuruan area, which hindered the export of agricultural products. The sugar mills (suikerfabrieken) which faced the problems were Sf. Kedawoeng, Sf. Bekassi Oost (Winongan), Sf. Gajam (Gayam), Sf. de Goede Hoop (Pengkol), Sf. Pleret (now ex textile factory Nebritex/Inbritex), Sf. Wonoredjo (Wonorejo) and Sf. Alkmaar (Purwosari).

After the necessary negotiations, PsSM received the concession from the Dutch East Indies Government. Started in 1893, as follows, to open a tram rail network:

- Based on Government Resolution No. 2 of March 18, 1893:
  - Pasuruan - Warung Dowo, 6 km (3.7 miles), was inaugurated on May 21, 1896.
  - Pasuruan - Boom (Pelabuhan) which connected to Pier for port activities. 2 km (1.2 miles), was opened on December 27, 1896.
- Based on Government Resolution No. 37 of August 29, 1895:
  - Warung Dowo - Bekasi ( →) which connected to Sf.Bekassie-Oost 10 km (6.2 miles) was opened on March 26, 1897.
  - Warung Dowo - Wonorejo, 11 km (6.8 miles), was opened on March 17, 1899.
  - Wonorejo - Bakalan, 4 km (2.5 miles) was opened in April 1899.
  - Bakalan - Alkmaar (Purwosari) near market, which connected to Sf.Alkmaar, 6 km (3.7 miles), was opened on May 8, 1900.
- Based on Government Resolution No. 19 of June 17, 1911:
  - Pasuruan - Gembong River, 3 km (1.9 miles), which connected to De Bromo, NV. machine shops opened on March 27, 1912.
  - Warung Dowo - Ngempit, 3 km (1.9 miles) was opened on 1 December 1912.
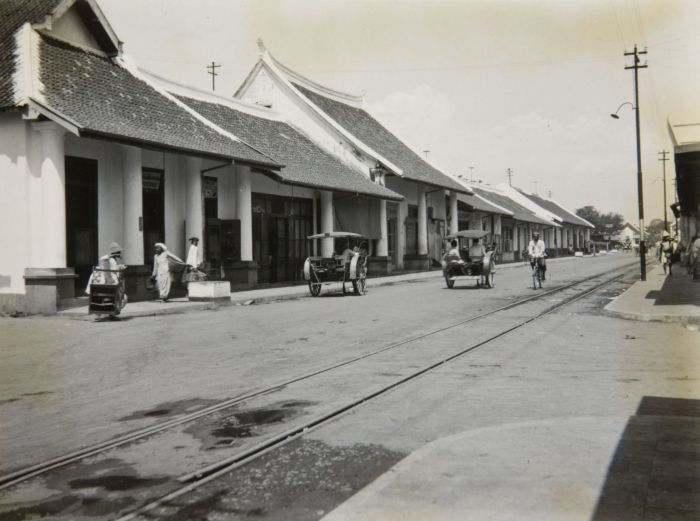
Chinatown of Broodbakkerstraat (now Jalan Niaga) in Pasuruan from Hoofdstraat (now Jalan Soekarno Hatta)

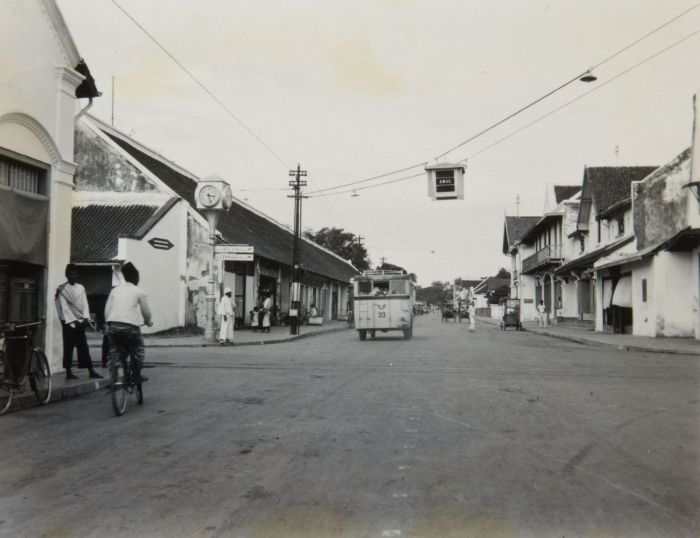
Traffic light over the intersection in the Hoofdstraat of Pasuruan

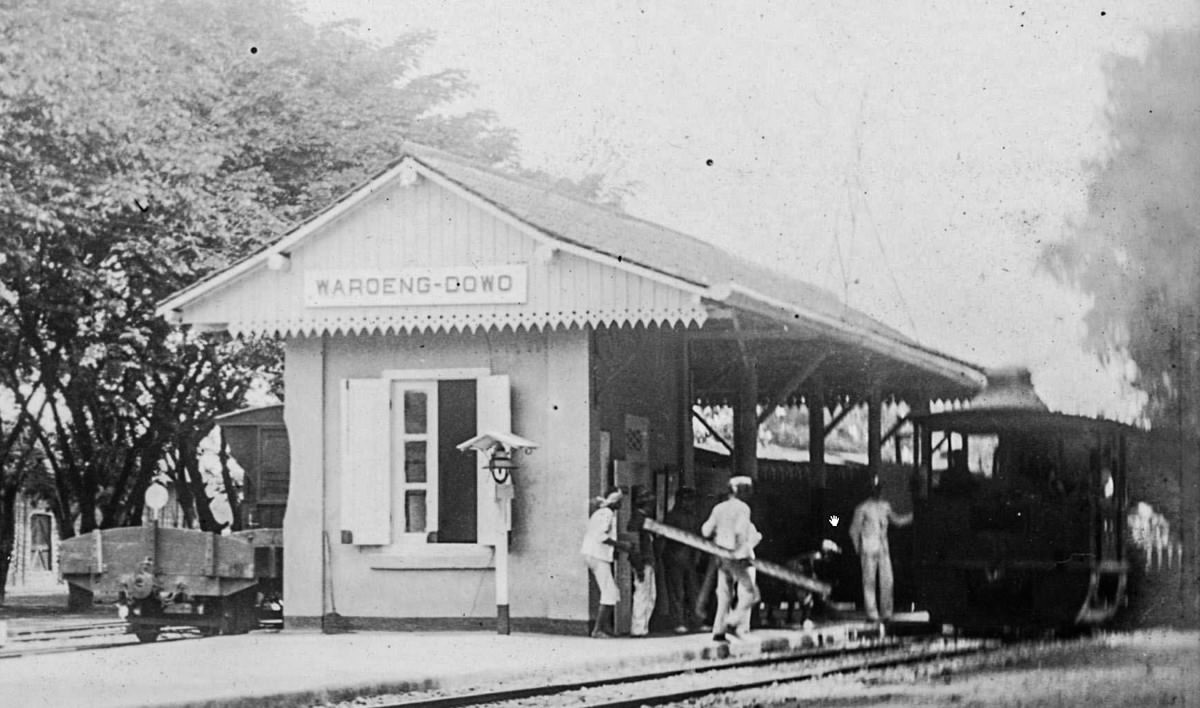
Warungdowo as the main operational station of PsSM with Hohenzollern B16 tram engine (right side).

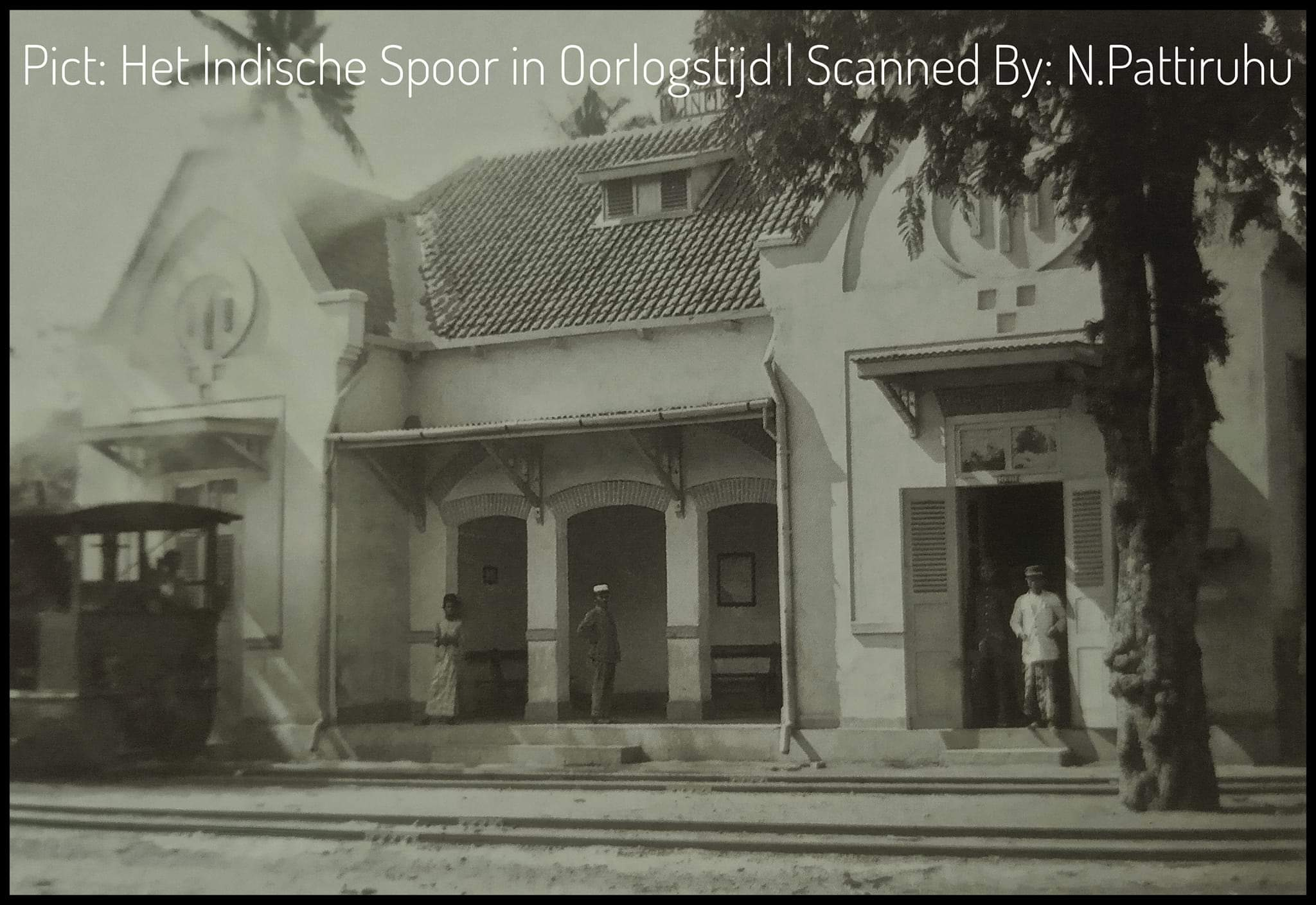
Winongan tram station around 1910-1920s

== Track construction ==
Name of the line	Line	Name of stations and halts	Opening date	Track length (km)	Remarks
Tram Line Pasuruan–Warungdowo	Pasuruan-Warung Dowo	Pasuruan railway station Pasuruan Ch.Kamp stop Alun-Alun tram stop Pasuruan Bui tram stop Kebonagung tram stop Rogoitan tram stop Pohjentrek tram stop Pleret tram stop Warungdowo tram station	21 May 1896	6	Closed on 1 February 1988
Tram Line Warungdowo-Winongan	Warung Dowo-Bekasi Oost (Winongan)	Warungdowo tram station Pengkol tram stop-Keboncandi tram stop Gayam tram stop(Pasuruan); Wonosalam tram stop Tenggilis tram stop Kletek tram stop Penataan tram stop Winongan tram station	26 March 1898	10,5	Closed on 1 February 1988
Tram Line Warungdowo–Alkmaar	Warung Dowo-Sengon	Warungdowo tram station Wangkal tram stop Klojen tram stop Gambiran stop Kurung tram stop Pacarkeling tram stop Areng-Areng tram stop Kluwut tram stop-Wonorejo Tram Station (Pasuruan); Blimbing tram stop (Pasuruan); Bakalan Stop; Procong tram stop Alkmaar tram station	8 May 1901	23,5	
Jalur kereta api Warungdowo–Sengon–Alkmaar	Sengon-Alkmaar	Sengon railway station Procong tram stop Alkmaar tram station	September 1901	3,5	
Tram Line Warungdowo-Ngempit	Warungdowo-Ngempit	Warungdowo tram station Susukan tram stop Plinggisan tram stop Sedodol tram stop Mojoloro tram stop Ngempit tram stop	1 December 1912	5	Closed in 1932

== Locomotives ==
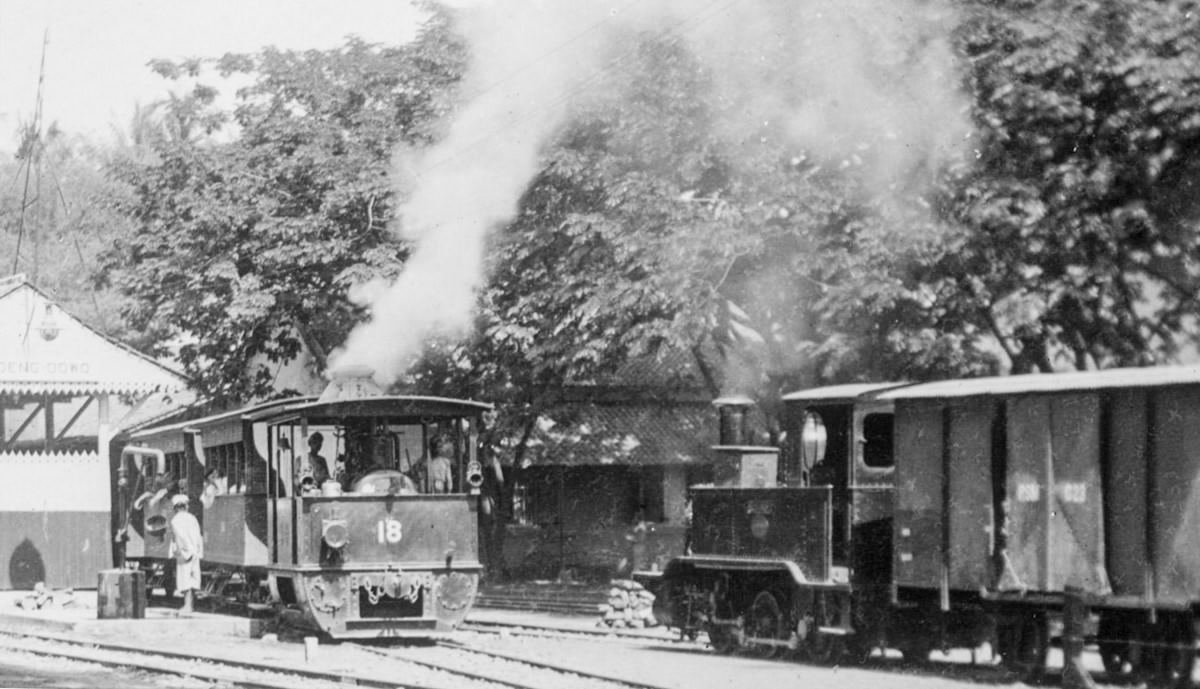
Hohenzollern 0-4-0Tr (B16) met Cockerill 0-6-0T (C22) 01 Louisa at Waroeng-Dowo tram station

In the beginning of the company's operation (around 1896), the PsSM imported 3 units of 0-4-0Tr (tram engine) (Type B) which were also used by Probolinggo Stoomtram Maatschappij (PbSM) (3 units) from Backer & Rueb (Machinefabriek Breda, Netherlands). However, when they were used for tough duty pulling a series of heavy sugarcane wagons, these locomotives often faced losing power (underpowered). Due to the poor performance of the engines, PsSM withdrew it from active service in 1897. After a while, PsSM imported 10 0-4-0Trs (tram engines) manufactured by Hohenzollern Locomotive Works, Germany (later became B16 during Japanese occupation and DKA/PNKA era), the first batch consisting of 5 units (08-12 series) came in 1897, also all Hohenzollern locomotives were ordered through Probolinggo from Holland with the numbers listed but some interchange of locomotives took place between the Probolinggo and Pasoeroean sister systems in the early days. Then, they acquired three John Cockerill & Cie. 0-6-0T locomotives of the 1894 manufactured year from Belgium, PsSM 6 Louisa (later became C2201 during Japanese occupation) came in 1905 and PsSM 7 Marie (later became C2202) in 1908. They also purchased a brand new of the same type later named PsSM 8 Nella (later became C2203) in 1911. The PsSM 6 and PsSM 7 were purchased from Staatsspoorwegen (SS) light rail locomotive (ex-SS 506 and SS 516). In addition, this private tram company also acquired a 0-6-0Tr (tram engine) PsSM 9 (later became type C25 No.06) from Hanomag, Germany in 1921. While the rest of five were used by Probolinggo Stoomtram as its sister company, to supported their tough duty hauling heavy sugarcane wagons, as they found that their B16s weren't so powerful enough to hauling heavy sugarcane trains. The Cockerill locomotives (Type C22s) were unusual, because they had an inside frame for the first two axles and an outside frame for the third axle. This provided more space for the firebox between the wheels but required very long crank pins on the inside framed wheels of the first two axles.

The steam trams facilitated the daily commute for the working people. Therefore, the tram quickly received a good response from the population, which used at that time otherwise traditional means of transport such as horses or carts. Despite the cheap prices, the tram was considered faster than other means of transport at the time. The locomotives were used not only for passenger cars, but also for freight cars that transported sugarcane and other export products to the port and also loaded factory machinery products from De Bromo, NV. machine shop (later became PT.Bromo Steel Indonesia (PT.Bosto)) to support the operational activities of several sugar mills in and around Pasuruan Regency and another factories. De Bromo also provided steal beam manufacturing as operational support for PsSM infrastructure like rail lines.

Because it had the same track gauge as state railway Staatsspoorwegen or SS, the PsSM trains could be integrated with SS main line and crops were could be transported through the Port of Pasuruan or transported directly to other cities without the need for unloading. For another option, the crops which were transported could be stored in advance to the government warehouses located just north of Pasuruan Station (Pasoeroean SS) (now located at Maluku street and Martadinata street via google maps).

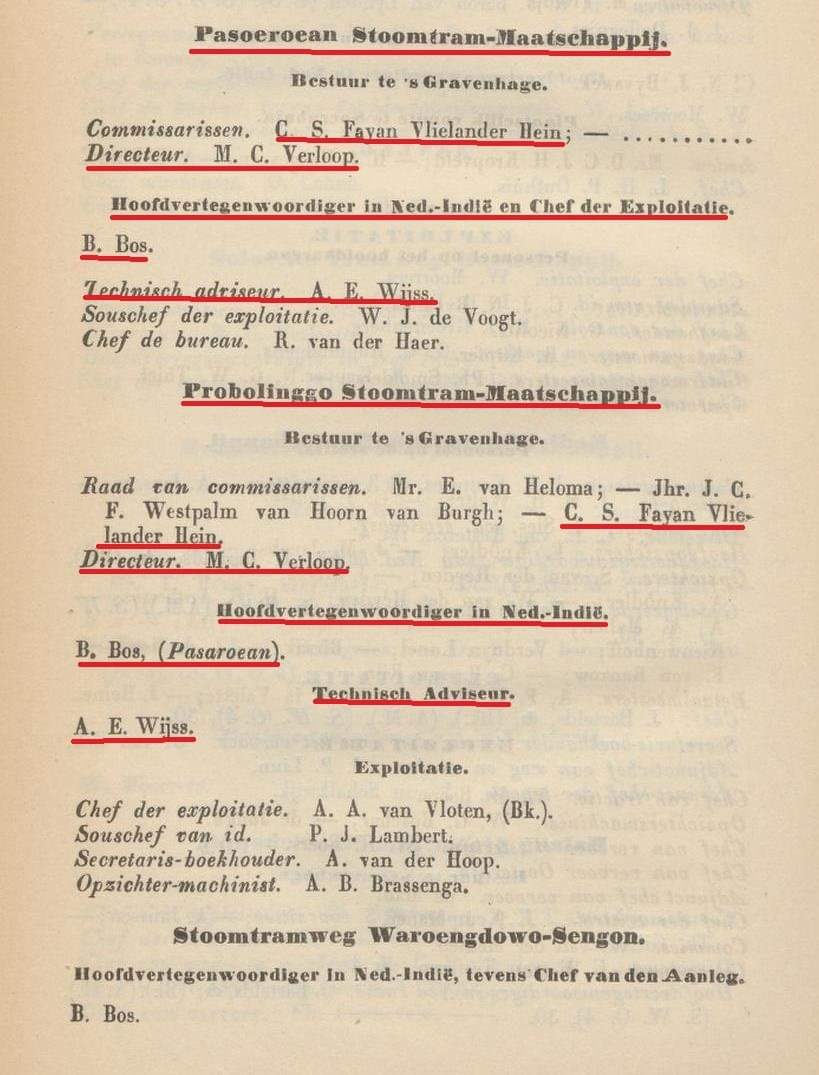
Pasoeroean Stoomtram Maatschappij (PsSM) and Probolinggo Stoomtram Maatschappij (PbSM) as the same group of steam tram company or so-called 'Sister Company' or 'Zuster Maatschappij' in Dutch phonetical. As looked at this photo, they had the same company's shareholders, commissioners, and CEO.

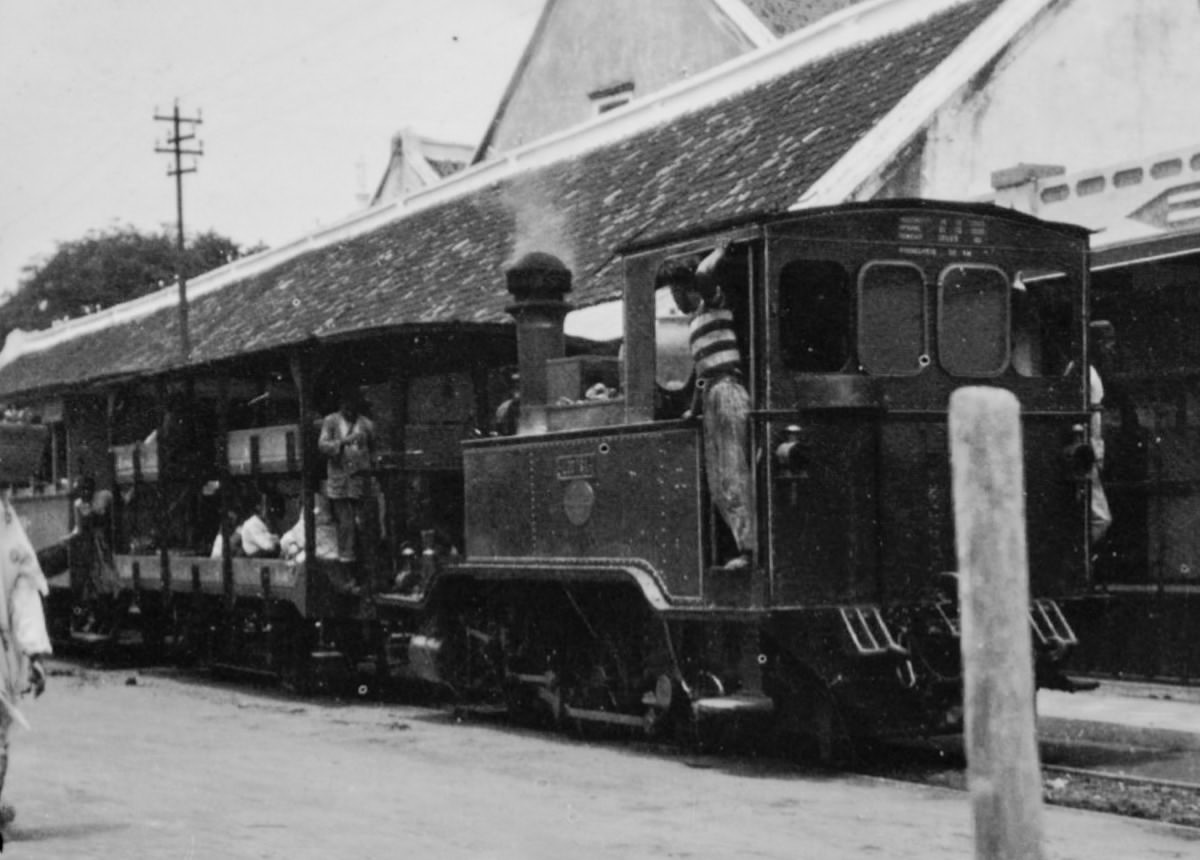
0-6-0T Cockerill steam locomotive (C22) in Chinatown (Jalan Niaga) of Pasuruan, 1929

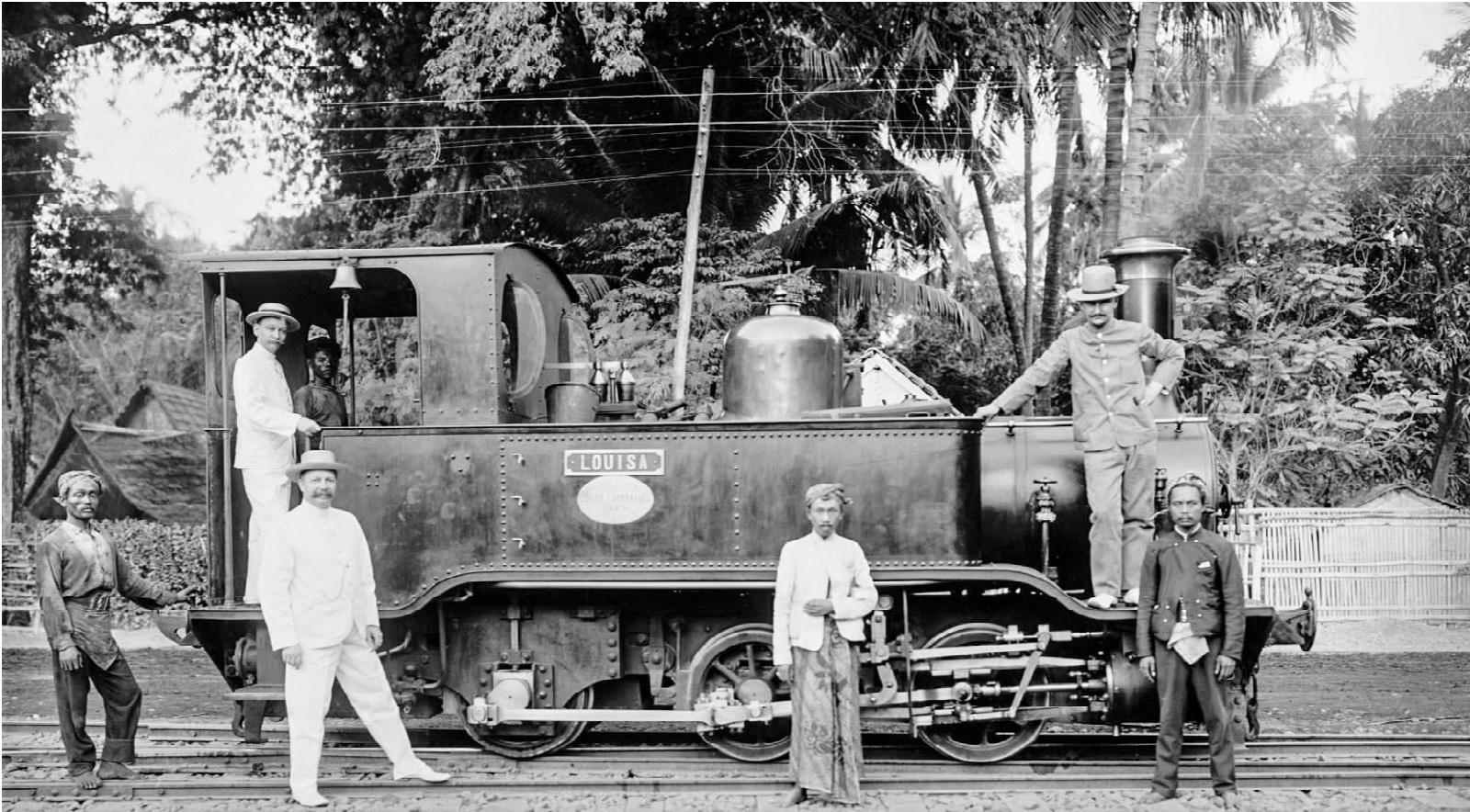
Cockerill locomotive PsSM 6 Louisa (later C2201), ca 1910

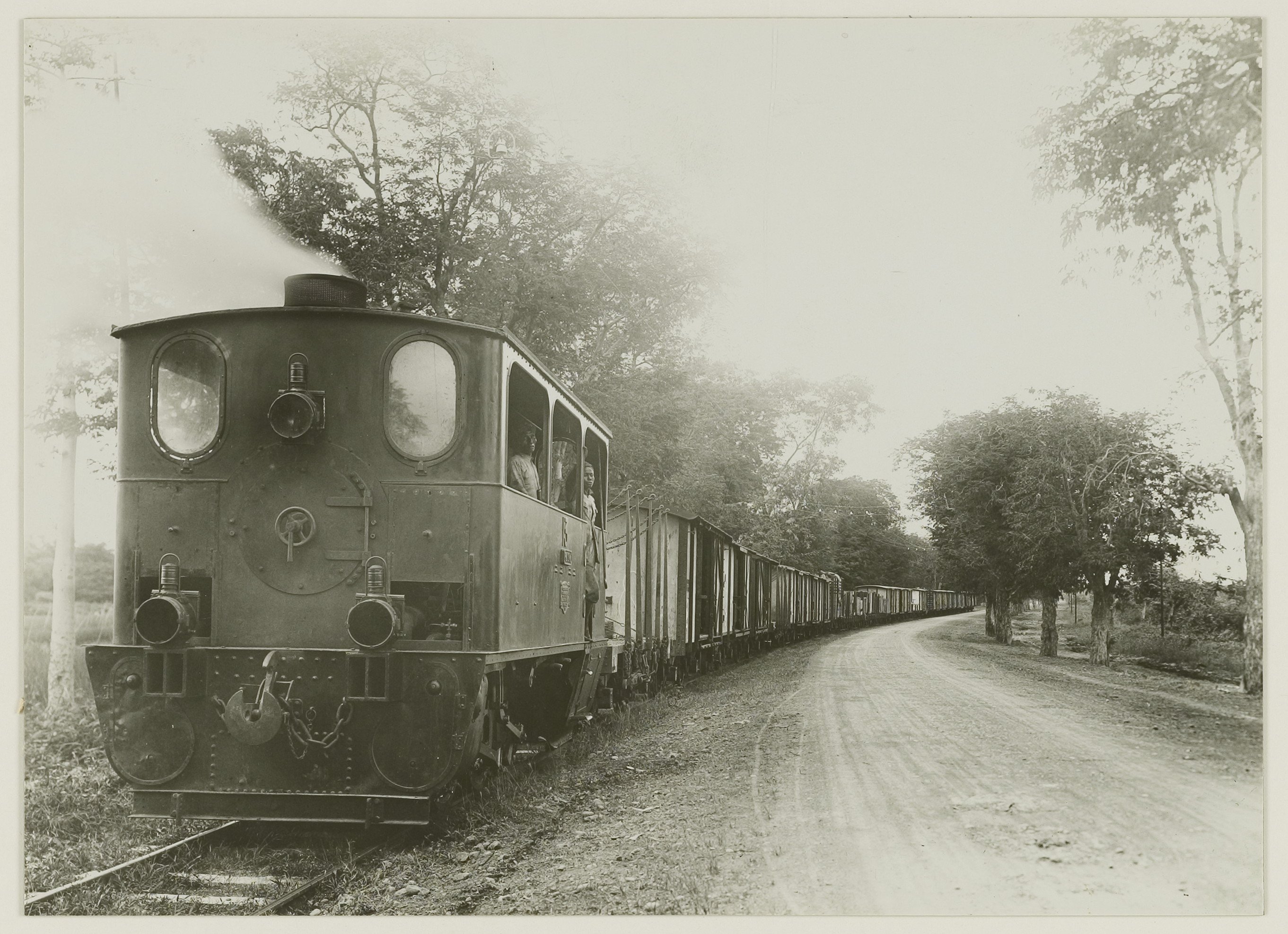
a sample of sugarcane train that hauled by Hanomag 0-6-0Tr (later C25) belonged to PbSM, Source: KITLV 19581

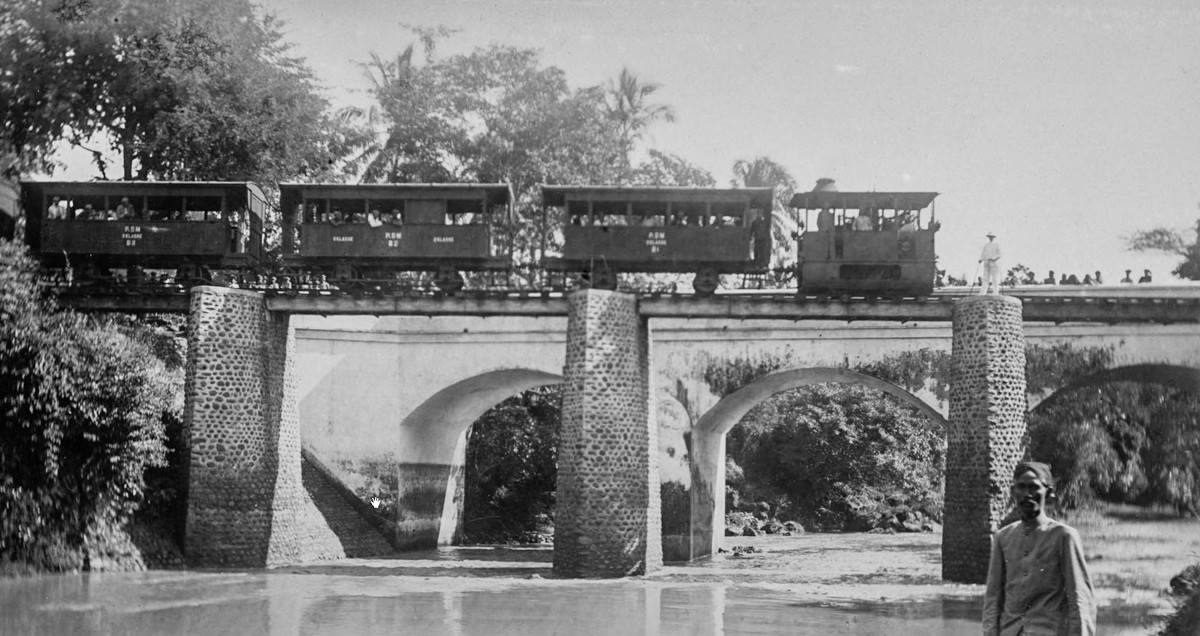
B16 with passenger cars crossed a bridge above Tumpang river beside Warungdowo-Wonorejo main road

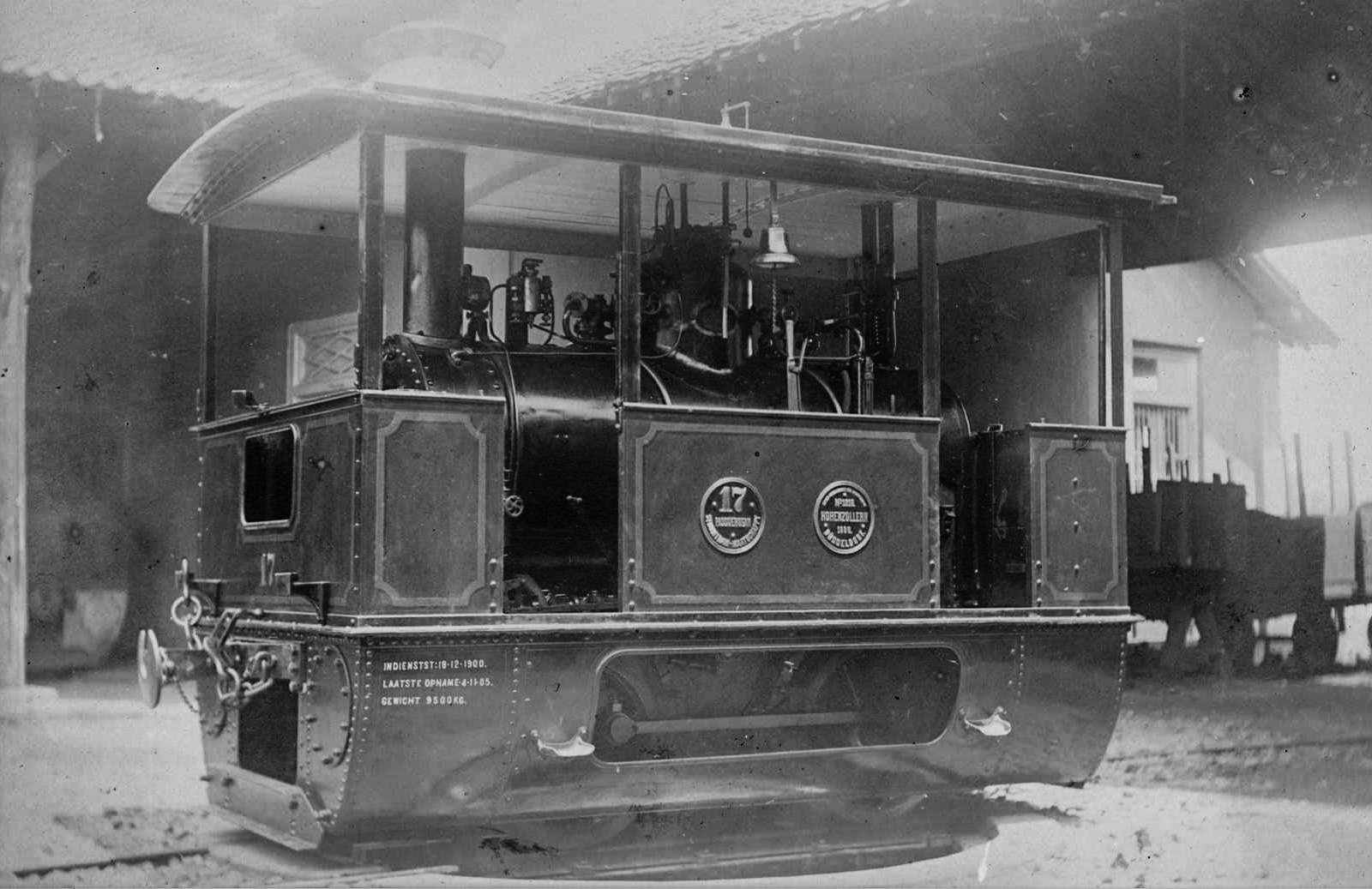
Hohenzollern PsSM 17 or B1611

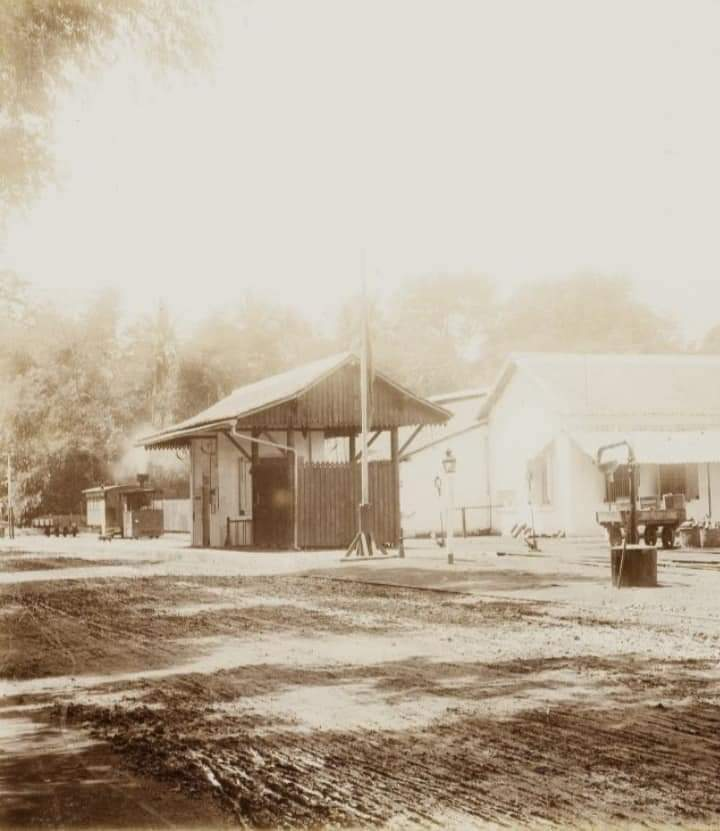
This was first layout of Warungdowo railway station before the platform was enlarged, also there was a PsSM train hauled by an early Backer & Rueb 0-4-0Tr loco in a distance.

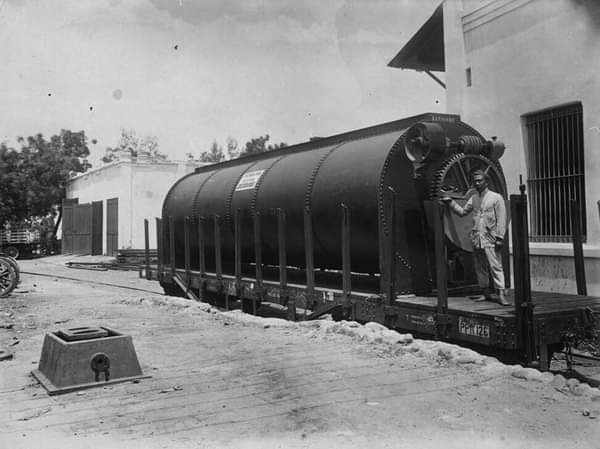
Freight wagons with large boilers for storage or transportation of liquids from De Bromo machine shops (now PT.Bosto)

== Closure ==
Over time, the tram was partially shut down by the PsSM, because it was not able to compete with the increasing road transport due to the ageing of rail vehicles and infrastructure. Some sections were closed during the Japanese occupation. In the decade of 1970-1980, the construction of roads was carried out on a large scale along with the increase of road traffic. The decommissioning took place as follows:

- Pasuruan-Boom (Pier) was shut down 1943/1944 by the Japanese
- Warungdowo - Ngempit was decommissioned in 1943/1944 by the Japanese
- Warungdowo - Wonorejo was shut down in 1976
- Pasuruan - Winongan was shut down by the Japanese, but later put back into service, because many sugar factories were still in operation. However, on February 1, 1988, this route was finally shut down.
