= Adi Wibowo =

Indonesian politician (born 1980)

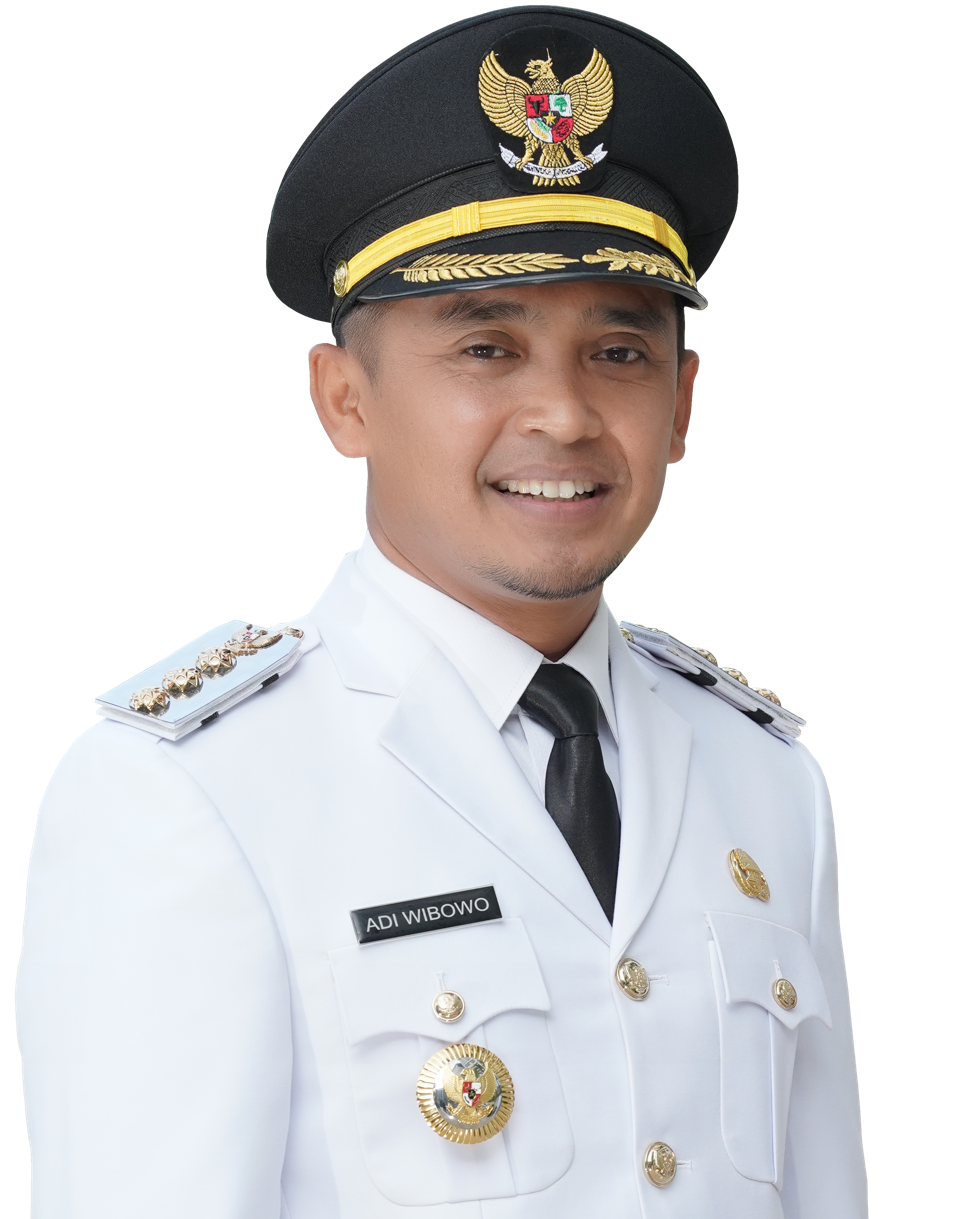
- Official portrait

20th Mayor of Pasuruan
- Incumbent
- Assumed office 24 December 2024 (Action Officer: 11 September 2024 – 24 December 2024)
- President: Prabowo Subianto
- Governor: Adhy Karyono (Pj.); Khofifah Indar Parawansa
- Deputy: Mokhamad Nawawi (2025–now)
- Preceded by: Saifullah Yusuf

4th Vice mayor of Pasuruan
- In office 26 February 2021 – 11 September 2024
- President: Joko Widodo
- Governor: Khofifah Indar Parawansa; Adhy Karyono (Pj.)
- Mayor: Saifullah Yusuf
- Preceded by: Raharto Teno Prasetyo
- Succeeded by: Mokhamad Nawawi

Personal details
- Born: 26 May 1980 (age 46) Temanggung Regency, Central Java
- Party: Golkar
- Spouse: Suryani Firdaus
- Children: 3
- Education: University of Jember (S.TP.); University of Indonesia (M.Si.); Brawijaya University (Dr.)
- Profession: Politician

Adi Wibowo (born 26 May 1980) is an Indonesian politician from the Golkar Party who served as Mayor of Pasuruan for the 2024–2025 and 2025–2030 term. He served for a second term since 20 February 2025 after being inaugurated by President Prabowo Subianto at the Istana Negara, Jakarta. Previously, he served as Vice mayor of Pasuruan for the 2021–2024 term, accompanying Saifullah Yusuf.

In the 2024 Pasuruan mayoral election, Adi ran for Mayor of Pasuruan for the 2025–2030 term, partnering with Mokhamad Nawawi, a National Awakening Party politician. This pair of candidates successfully defeated the empty ticket, winning 79.814 votes or 80,59% of the total valid votes.

Political offices
Preceded by Saifullah Yusuf	Mayor of Pasuruan; 2024–2025, 2025–2030	Succeeded by Incumbent
Preceded by Raharto Teno Prasetyo	Vice mayor of Pasuruan; 2021–2024	Succeeded by Mokhamad Nawawi
