= Pasuruan =

City in East Java, Indonesia

- City
- City of Pasuruan; Kota Pasuruan

Regional transcription(s)
  - Javanese: Kuthå Pasuruhan (Gêdrig) كوڟا ڤاسوروهن (Pégon) ꦏꦸꦛꦥꦱꦸꦫꦸꦃꦲꦤ꧀ (Hånåcåråkå)
  - Madurese: Kottha Pasuruwân (Latèn) كَوڟّا ڤاسورووۤان (Pèghu) ꦏꦺꦴꦛ꧀ꦛꦦꦱꦸꦫꦸꦮꦤ꧀ (Carakan)
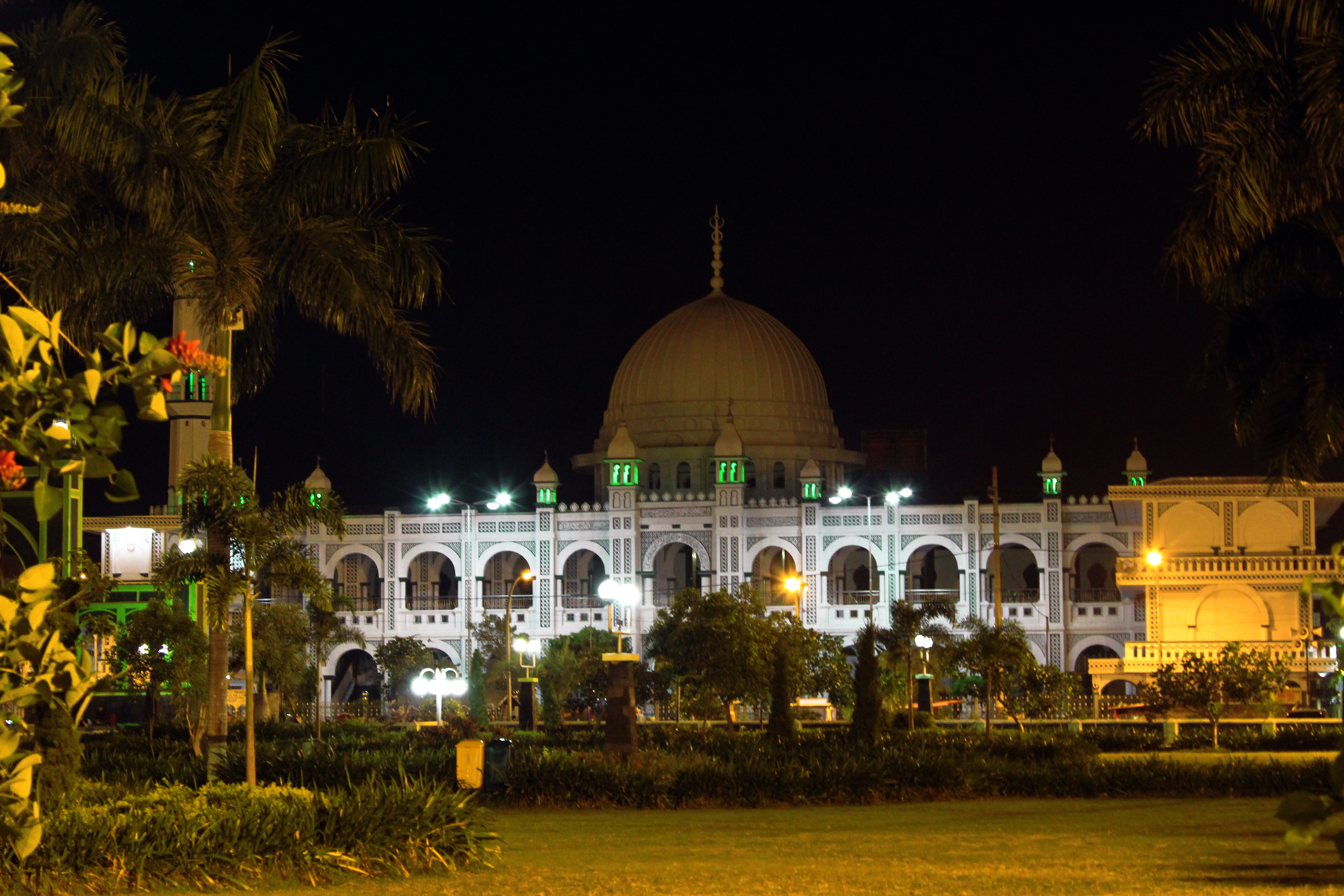
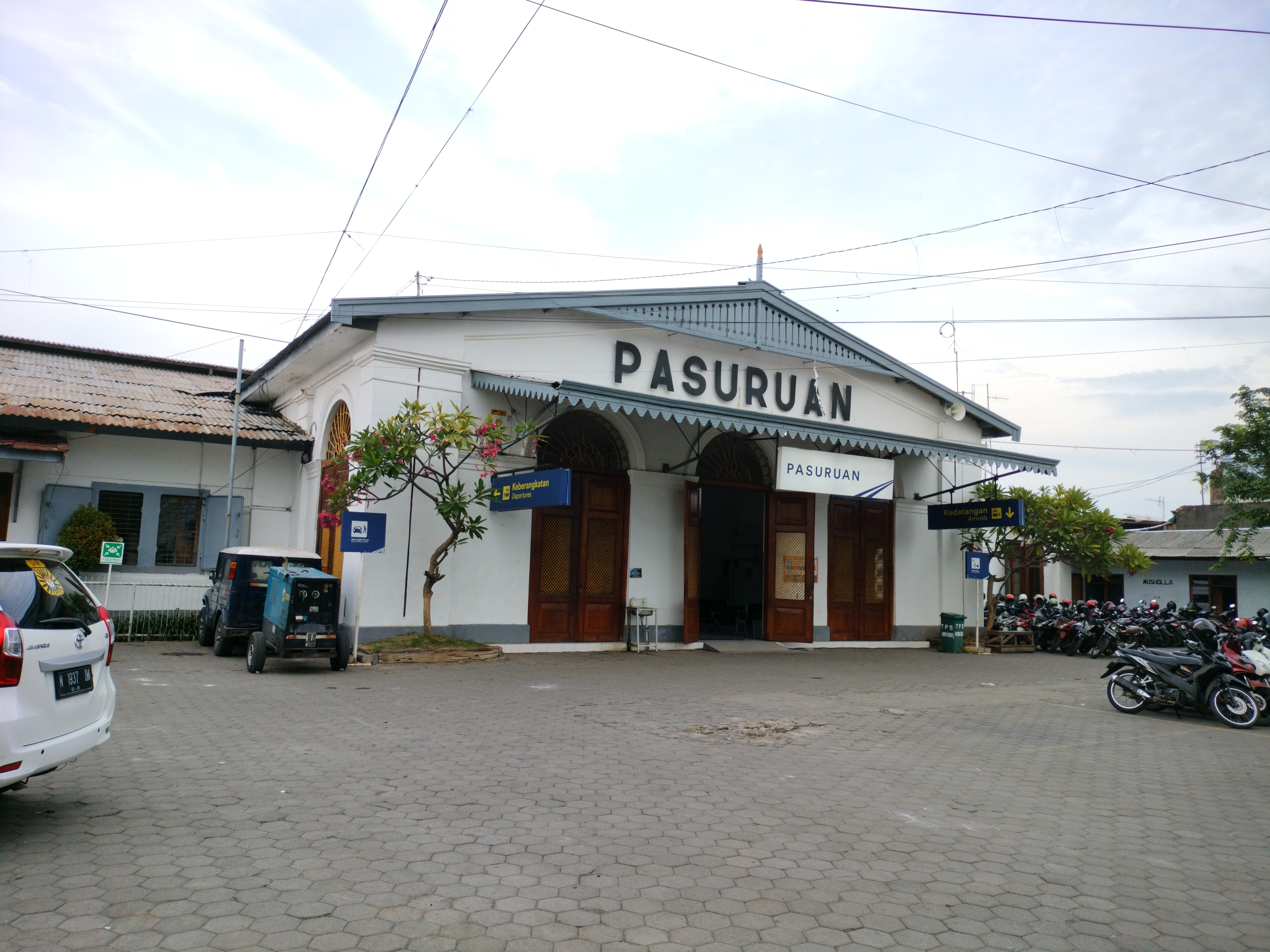
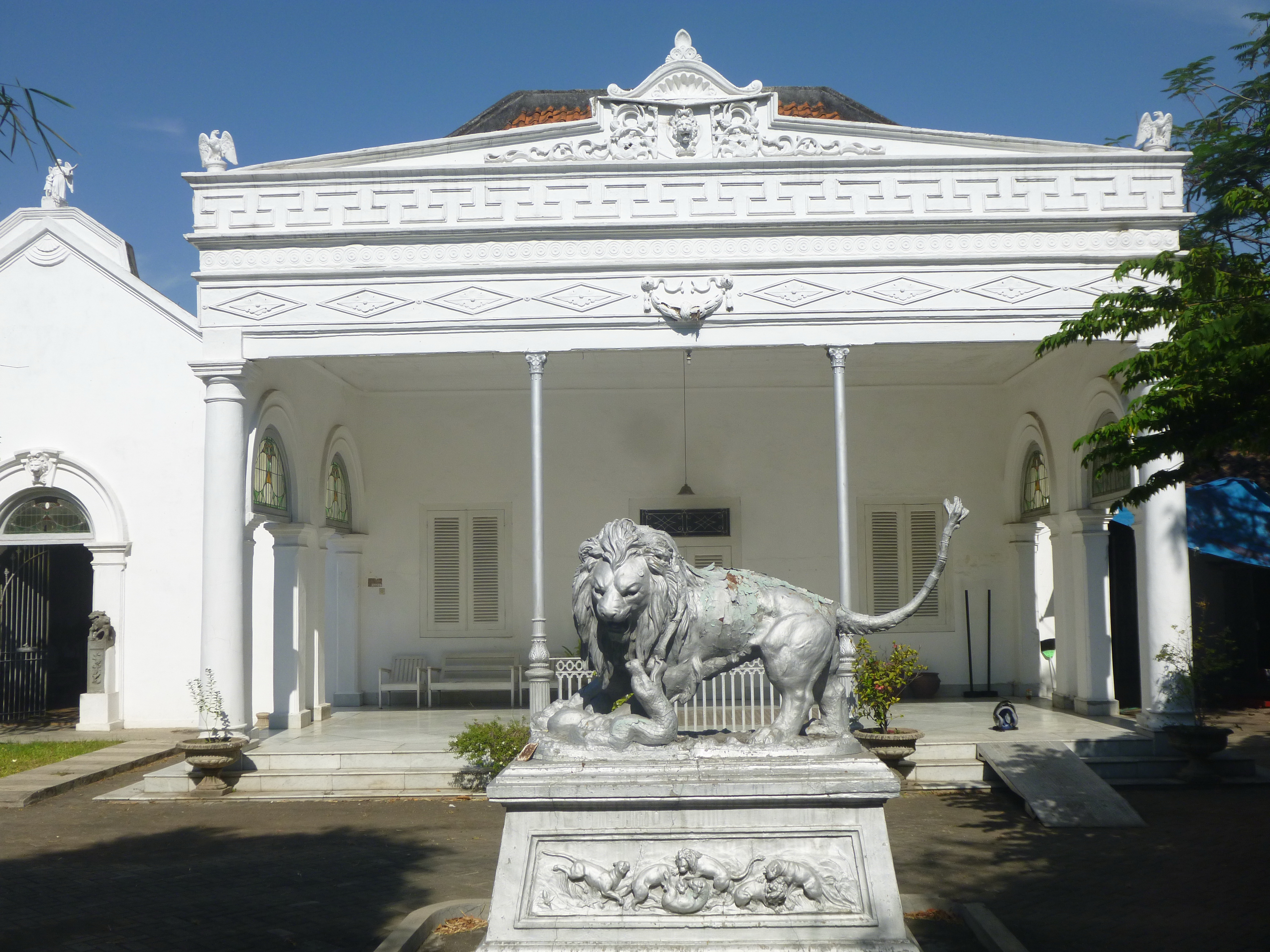
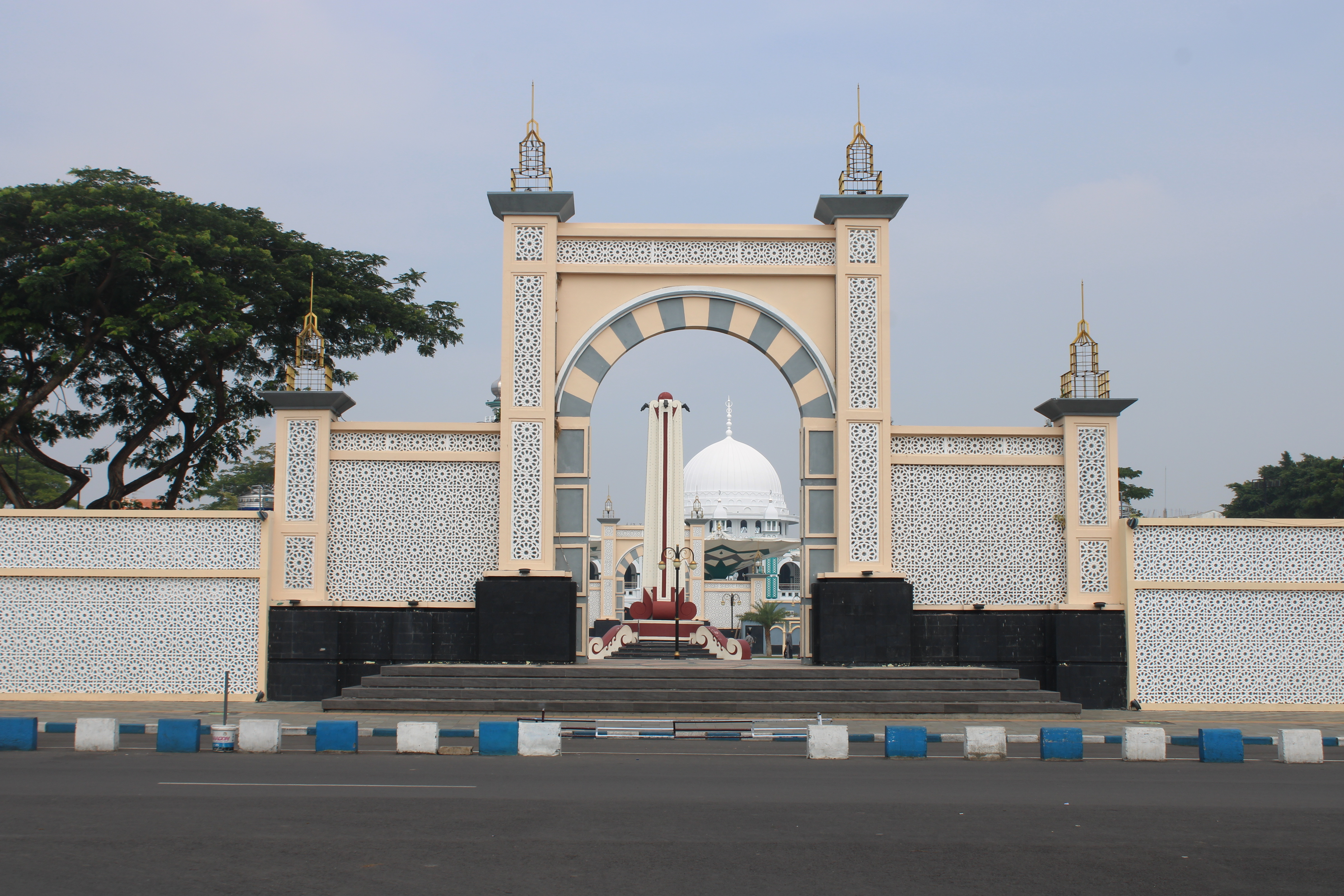
- From clockwise top: Jami Al-Anwar Mosque at night, Pasuruan railway station, Omah Singa, Alun-alun of Pasuruan

- Coat of arms
- Motto: Sura Dira Satya Pati (Javanese) ꦱꦸꦫꦣꦶꦫꦱꦠꦾꦥꦠꦶ (Courageous and loyal to the chief)
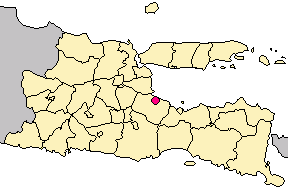
- Location within East Java

- Location in Java and Indonesia Pasuruan (Indonesia)
- Coordinates: 7°38′26.24″S 112°54′23.32″E
- Country: Indonesia
- Province: East Java

Government
  - Mayor: Adi Wibowo
  - Vice Mayor: Mokhamad Nawawi

Area
  - Total: 39.00 km^{2} (15.06 sq mi)

Population (mid 2025 estimate)
  - Total: 213,838
  - Density: 5,483/km^{2} (14,200/sq mi)
- Time zone: UTC+7 (IWST)
- Area code: (+62) 343
- Website: pasuruankota.go.id

Pasuruan (Dutch: Pasoeroean) is a city in East Java Province of Java, Indonesia. It had a population of 186,262 at the 2010 Census and 208,006 at the 2020 Census; the official estimate as of mid 2025 was 213,838 (comprising 107,013 males and 106,825 females).

It is surrounded on the landward side by, but is administratively separate from, Pasuruan Regency. On the north side it faces onto the Madura Strait. It is located around 65 kilometres southeast of Surabaya, the provincial capital.

== Administrative districts ==
Pasuruan is divided into four districts (kecamatan), tabulated below with their areas and their populations at the 2010 and 2020 Censuses, together with the official estimates as of mid 2025. The table also includes the locations of the district administrative centres, the number of administrative villages in each district (urban kelurahan) and their names, and the postal codes.

Kode Wilayah	Name of District (kecamatan)	Area in km^{2}	Pop'n Census 2010	Pop'n Census 2020	Pop'n Estimate mid 2025	Admin centre	No. of villages	Names of urban villages (kelurahan) with their Post codes
35.75.01	Gadingrejo	8.69	62,401	49,442	51,603	Gadingrejo	8	Bukir (67138), Gadingrejo (67145), Gentong (67139), Karangketug (67135), Krapyakrejo (67137), Petahunan (67136), Randusari (67136), Sebani (67139)
35.75.02	Purworejo	8.34	66,647	62,007	62,855	Kebonagung	7	Kebonagung (67116), Pohjentrek (67171), Purutrejo (67117), Purworejo (67115), Sekargadung (67127), Tembokrejo (67118), Wirogunan (67118)
35.75.03	Bugulkidul	14.97	57,214	31,687	32,407	Bugulkidul	6	Kepel (67129), Blandongan (67128), Tapaan (67129), Bakalan (67128), Krampyangan (67127), Bugul Kidul (67129)
35.75.04	Panggungrejo	7.00	^{(a)}	64,870	66,973	Ngemplakrejo	13	Bangilan (67111), Bugul Lor (67129), Kandangsapi (67125), Karanganyar (67131), Kebonsari (67114), Mandaranrejo (67123), Mayangan (67112), Ngemplakrejo (67113), Panggungrejo (67124), Pekuncen (67126), Petamanan (67126), Tambaan (67133), Trajeng (67132)
	Totals	39.00	186,262	208,006	213,838	Panggungrejo	34	

Note: (a) Panggungrejo District created since 2010 from parts of neighbouring districts; its population in 2010 is included with that of the districts from which it was formed.

== Government ==
=== Mayor ===
The Mayor of Pasuruan is the highest-ranking official within the Pasuruan City government. He reports to the Governor of East Java. The current mayor or regional head of Pasuruan City is Adi Wibowo, with Mokhamad Nawawi as vice mayor. They took office on 20 February 2025.

== Climate ==
Pasuruan has a tropical savanna climate (Köppen Aw) with little to no rainfall from May to November and heavy rainfall from December to April.

Climate data for Pasuruan
Month	Jan	Feb	Mar	Apr	May	Jun	Jul	Aug	Sep	Oct	Nov	Dec	Year
Mean daily maximum °C (°F)	32.3 (90.1)	32.0 (89.6)	32.0 (89.6)	32.0 (89.6)	31.9 (89.4)	31.9 (89.4)	31.8 (89.2)	32.4 (90.3)	32.8 (91.0)	33.5 (92.3)	33.3 (91.9)	32.6 (90.7)	32.4 (90.3)
Daily mean °C (°F)	27.4 (81.3)	27.3 (81.1)	27.1 (80.8)	27.0 (80.6)	26.5 (79.7)	25.9 (78.6)	25.3 (77.5)	25.8 (78.4)	26.4 (79.5)	27.2 (81.0)	27.7 (81.9)	27.3 (81.1)	26.7 (80.1)
Mean daily minimum °C (°F)	22.5 (72.5)	22.6 (72.7)	22.3 (72.1)	22.0 (71.6)	21.1 (70.0)	19.9 (67.8)	18.9 (66.0)	19.3 (66.7)	20.0 (68.0)	21.0 (69.8)	22.1 (71.8)	22.1 (71.8)	21.2 (70.1)
Average rainfall mm (inches)	239 (9.4)	259 (10.2)	202 (8.0)	139 (5.5)	92 (3.6)	61 (2.4)	19 (0.7)	2 (0.1)	9 (0.4)	20 (0.8)	81 (3.2)	188 (7.4)	1,311 (51.7)
Source: Climate-Data.org

== Public transport ==
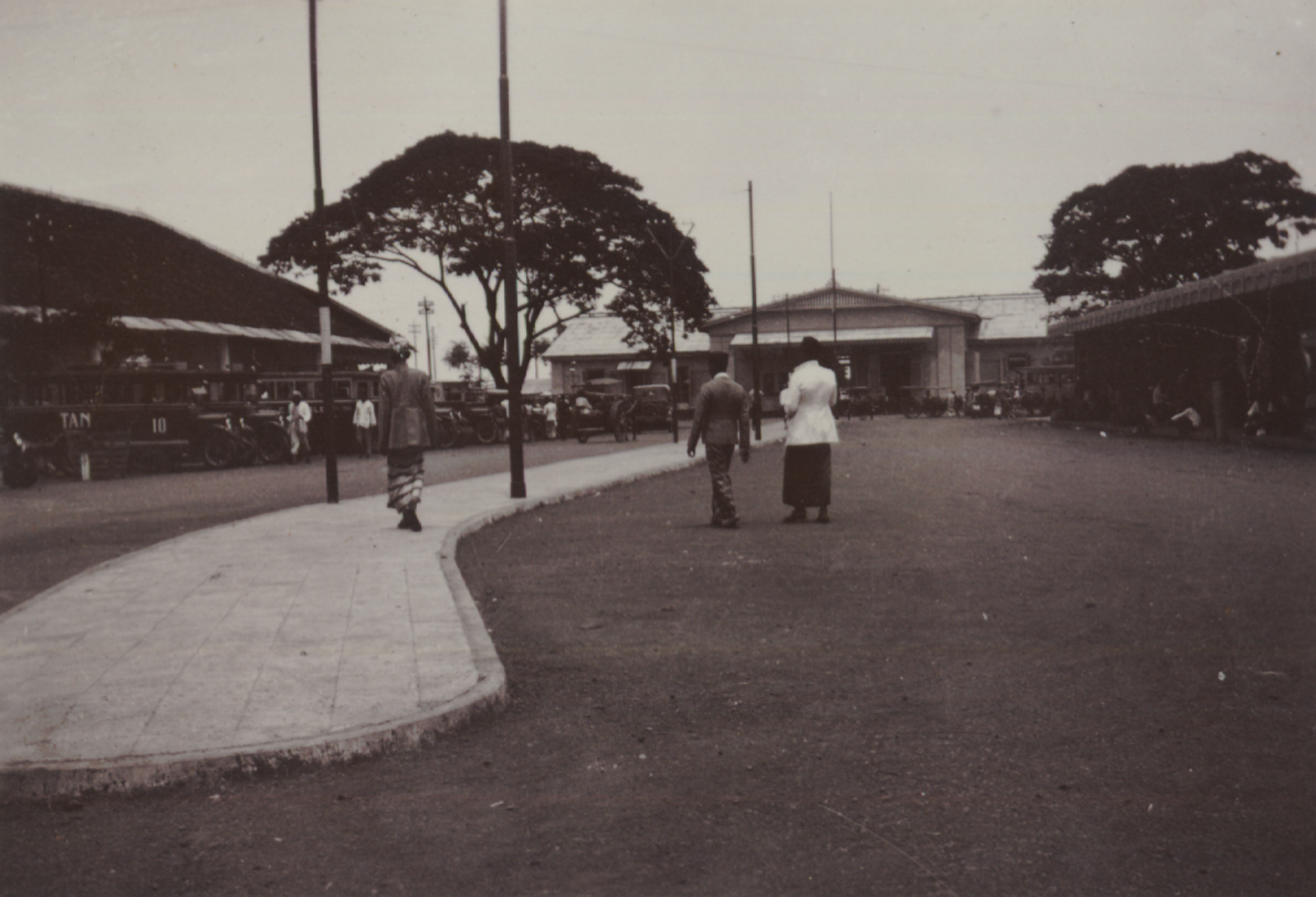
Pasuruan railway station from Hoofdstraat or de Groote Postweg (now Soekarno Hatta rd.) (1929)

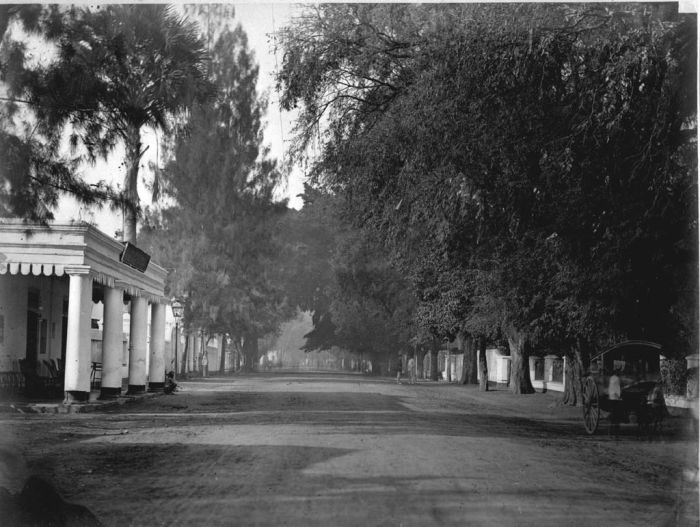
The Hotel Morbeck (left side) on Heerenstraat (now Balaikota str.) in Pasuruan, circa 1870-1891

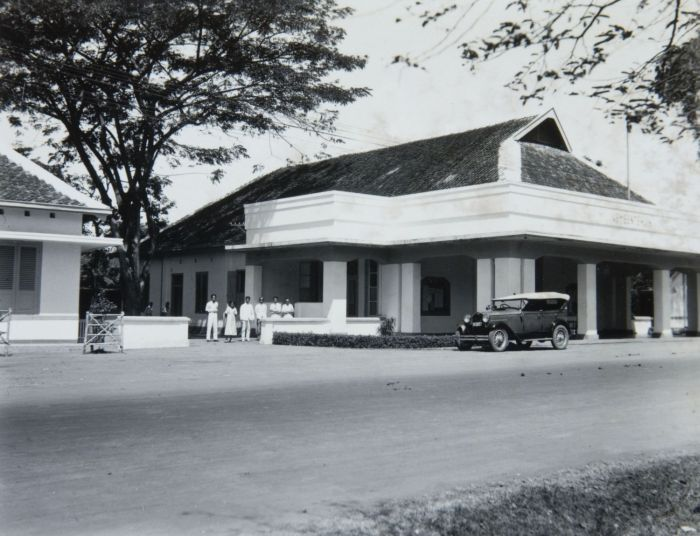
Pasuruan City Hall (1934)

Pasuruan located and connected by provincial main road between Surabaya―Banyuwangi. Pasuruan can be reached from Surabaya by bus or local commuter train, which took at least 2 hours. It also can be reached from Malang by bus or car that took at least 1.3 hours. This town linked with other cities by Trans Java Freeway.

The city has an active railway station as a stop for intercity trains and local commuter from Surabaya Kota. To the west before Bangil railway station there's Kraton railway station which is inactive today due to close range from Pasuruan station. In the past, this city had the local steam tram company named Pasoeroean Stoomtram Maatschappij served from 1896 to 1969. This train served as passenger transport as well as freight transport of agricultural products such as sugarcane, tea and tobacco.

== Sport ==
The town has two football clubs, which both play at the 5,000 capacity Untung Suropati Stadium: Pasuruan United and Persekap Pasuruan.

=== Pasuruan United ===
This club was founded with the name Persema 1953 in 2013 by the PSSI Malang City Regional Executive Board. At that time, Persema 1953 was a new club that was planned to be formed for the Third Division competition. They chose to form a new club because they were hesitant to accept the offer to transfer the club Persema Malang. Because, at that time, Persema Malang status was uncertain because it was no longer a member of PSSI since being removed in 2011.

In 2021, Persema 1953 finally changed its name to AFA Syailendra. A year later, in 2022, PSSI approved the name change of the AFA Syailendra, which changed its name to Pasuruan United.

In the 2025–26 Liga 4 season, Pasuruan United were promoted to Liga Nusantara after beating Persigar 1–0 in the second matchday of the fourth round of the national phase, later they became champions after beating Pesik 1–0 in the final.
