= List of incumbent regional heads and deputy regional heads in East Java =

The following is an article about the list of Regional Heads and Deputy Regional Heads in 38 regencies/cities in East Java who are currently still serving.

== List ==
| Regency or city | Regent/Mayor | | Vice Regent/Mayor | | Taking Office | End of Office (planned) | Ref. |
|---|---|---|---|---|---|---|---|
| Bangkalan; Regency List of Regents/Deputy Regents | | Lukman Hakim | | Fauzan Ja'far | 20 February 2025 | 20 February 2030 | |
| Banyuwangi; Regency List of Regents/Deputy Regents | | Ipuk Fiestiandani | | Mujiono | 20 February 2025 | 20 February 2030 | |
| Blitar; Regency List of Regents/Deputy Regents | | Rijanto | | Beky Herdihansah | 20 February 2025 | 20 February 2030 | |
| Bojonegoro; Regency List of Regents/Deputy Regents | | Setyo Wahono | | Nurul Azizah | 20 February 2025 | 20 February 2030 | |
| Bondowoso; Regency List of Regents/Deputy Regents | pus | Abdul Hamid Wahid | pus | As'ad Yahya Syafi'i | 20 February 2025 | 20 February 2030 | |
| Gresik; Regency List of Regents/Deputy Regents | | Fandi Akhmad Yani | pus | Asluchul Alif | 20 February 2025 | 20 February 2030 | |
| Jember; Regency List of Regents/Deputy Regents | pus | Muhammad Fawait | pus | Djoko Susanto | 20 February 2025 | 20 February 2030 | |
| Jombang; Regency List of Regents/Deputy Regents | pus | Warsubi | pus | Salmanudin Yazid | 20 February 2025 | 20 February 2030 | |
| Kediri; Regency List of Regents/Deputy Regents | | Hanindhito Himawan Pramana | pus | Dewi Mariya Ulfa | 26 February 2021 | 20 February 2030 | |
| Lamongan; Regency List of Regents/Deputy Regents | pus | Yuhronur Efendi | | Dirham Akbar Aksara | 20 February 2025 | 20 February 2030 | |
| Lumajang; Regency List of Regents/Deputy Regents | pus | Indah Amperawati Masdar | pus | Yudha Adji Kusuma | 20 February 2025 | 20 February 2030 | |
| Madiun; Regency List of Regents/Deputy Regents | pus | Hari Wuryanto | pus | Purnomo Hadi | 20 February 2025 | 20 February 2030 | |
| Magetan; Regency List of Regents/Deputy Regents | pus | Nanik Endang Rusminarti | pus | Suyatni Priasmoro | 23 May 2025 | 23 May 2030 | |
| Malang; Regency List of Regents/Vice Regents | | Sanusi | | Lathifah Shohib | 20 February 2025 | 20 February 2030 | |
| Mojokerto; Regency List of Regents/Deputy Regents | pus | Muhammad Al Barra | pus | Muhammad Rizal Octavian | 20 February 2025 | 20 February 2030 | |
| Nganjuk; Regency List of Regents/Deputy Regents | pus | Marhaen Djumadi | pus | Trihandy Cahyo Saputro | 20 February 2025 | 20 February 2030 | |
| Ngawi; Regency List of Regents/Deputy Regents | pus | Ony Anwar Harsono | pus | Dwi Rianto Jatmiko | 26 February 2021 | 20 February 2030 | |
| Pacitan; Regency List of Regents/Deputy Regents | | Indrata Nur Bayuaji | pus | Gagarin Sumrambah | 26 April 2021 | 20 February 2030 | |
| Pamekasan; Regency List of Regents/Deputy Regents | pus | Kholilurrahman | pus | Sukriyanto | 19 March 2025 | 19 March 2030 | |
| Pasuruan; Regency List of Regents/Deputy Regents | pus | Mochamad Rusdi Sutejo | pus | M. Shobih Asrori | 20 February 2025 | 20 February 2030 | |
| Ponorogo; Regency List of Regents/Deputy Regents | pus | Lisdyarita (Acting Officer) | | | 8 November 2025 | 20 February 2030 | |
| Probolinggo; Regency List of Regents/Deputy Regents | pus | Muhammad Haris DR | pus | Fahmi AHZ | 20 February 2025 | 20 February 2030 | |
| Sampang; Regency List of Regents/Deputy Regents | | Slamet Junaidi | | Ahmad Mahfudz | 20 February 2025 | 20 February 2030 | |
| Sidoarjo; Regency List of Regents/Deputy Regents | | Subandi | pus | Mimik Idayana | 20 February 2025 | 20 February 2030 | |
| Situbondo; Regency List of Regents/Deputy Regents | | Yusuf Rio Wahyu Prayogo | | Ulfiyah | 20 February 2025 | 20 February 2030 | |
| Sumenep; Regency List of Regents/Deputy Regents | pus | Achmad Fauzi | pus | Imam Hasyim | 20 February 2021 | 20 February 2030 | |
| Trenggalek; Regency List of Regents/Deputy Regents | pus | Mochamad Nur Arifin | pus | Syah Muhamad Nata Negara | 26 February 2021 | 20 February 2030 | |
| Tuban; Regency List of Regents/Deputy Regents | | Aditya Halindra Faridzky | | Joko Sarwono | 20 February 2025 | 20 February 2030 | |
| Tulungagung; Regency List of Regents/Deputy Regents | pus | Ahmad Baharudin (Acting Officer) | | | 13 April 2026 | 20 February 2030 | |
| Batu; City List of Mayors/Vice mayors | pus | Nurochman | pus | Heli Suyanto | 20 February 2025 | 20 February 2030 | |
| Blitar; City List of Mayors/Deputy mayors | | Syauqul Muhibbin | | Elim Tyu Samba | 20 February 2025 | 20 February 2030 | |
| Kediri; City List of Mayors/Deputy mayors | pus | Vinanda Prameswati | pus | Qowimuddin Thoha | 20 February 2025 | 20 February 2030 | |
| Madiun; City List of Mayors/Deputy mayors | | F. Bagus Panuntun (Acting Officer) | | | 21 January 2026 | 20 February 2030 | |
| Malang; City List of Mayors/Vice mayors | | Wahyu Hidayat | | Ali Muthohirin | 20 February 2025 | 20 February 2030 | |
| Mojokerto; City List of Mayors/Deputy mayors | pus | Ika Puspitasari | pus | Rachman Sidharta Arisandi | 20 February 2025 | 20 February 2030 | |
| Pasuruan; City List of Mayors/Deputy mayors | pus | Adi Wibowo | pus | Mokhamad Nawawi | 20 February 2025 | 20 February 2030 | |
| Probolinggo; City List of Mayors/Deputy mayors | | Aminuddin | | Ina Dwi Lestari | 20 February 2025 | 20 February 2030 | |
| Surabaya; City List of Mayors/Vice mayors | | Eri Cahyadi | | Armuji | 26 February 2021 | 20 February 2030 | |

Notes

- "Commencement of office" is the inauguration date at the beginning or during the current term of office. For acting regents/mayors, it is the date of appointment or extension as acting regent/mayor.
- Based on the Constitutional Court decision Number 27/PUU-XXII/2024, the Governor and Deputy Governor, Regent and Deputy Regent, and Mayor and Deputy Mayor elected in 2020 shall serve until the inauguration of the Governor and Deputy Governor, Regent and Deputy Regent, and Mayor and Deputy Mayor elected in the 2024 national simultaneous elections as long as the term of office does not exceed 5 (five) years.

== See also ==
- East Java
