= Mayor of Mojokerto =

Head of government of Mojokerto, Indonesia

- Wali Kota Mojokerto
- Coat of arms of Mojokerto

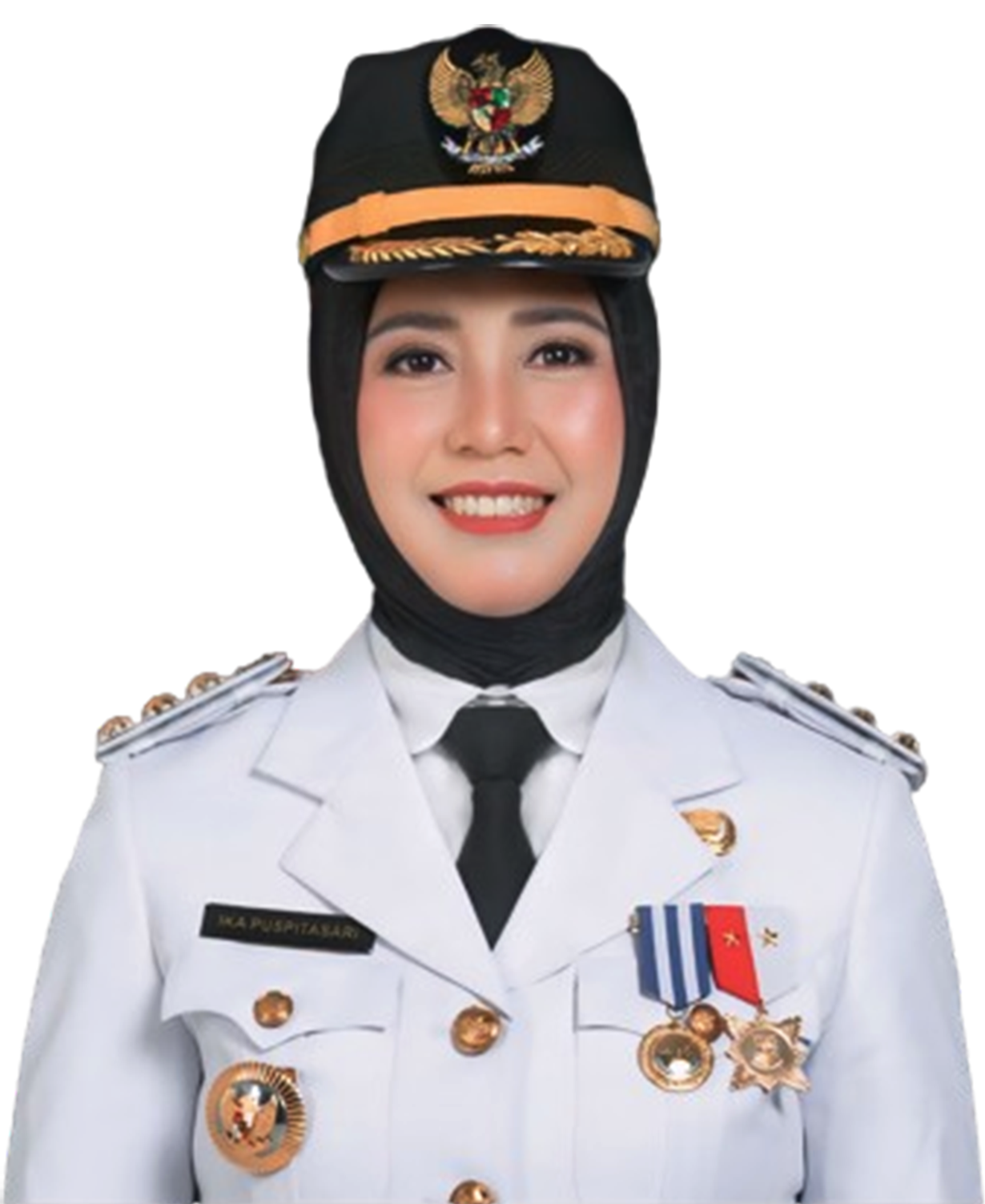
- Incumbent; Ika Puspitasari since 20 February 2025
- Term length: 5 years
- Inaugural holder: L. Van Dijk
- Formation: 30 January 1929
- Website: www.mojokertokota.go.id

The Mayor of Mojokerto is the head of the second-level region who holds the government in Mojokerto together with the vice mayor and 25 members of the Mojokerto City Regional House of Representatives. The mayor and vice mayor of Mojokerto are elected through general elections held every 5 years. The first mayor of Mojokerto was L. Van Dijk, who governed the city from 1929 to 1936.

== Under Dutch colonial rule (1929-1941) ==
Burgemeester van Mojokerto
Num.	Portrait	Mayor	Beginning of office	End of Term	Political Party / Faction	Period	Note.	Vice mayor
1		L. Van Dijk	30 January 1929	22 July 1936	Independent	1		N/A
2		H.J. Van Harften	22 July 1936	13 March 1940	Independent	2		N/A
3		H.D. Van Werkum	25 September 1940	10 October 1941	Independent	3		N/A

== Under Japanese occupation (1942-1945) ==
モジョケルト市長
Num.	Portrait	Mayor	Beginning of office	End of Term	Political Party / Faction	Period	Note.	Vice mayor
1		Kiroda	8 May 1942	15 August 1945	Independent	4		N/A

== Republic of Indonesia (since 1945) ==
Mayor of Mojokerto
Num.	Portrait	Mayor	Beginning of office	End of Term	Political Party / Faction	Period	Note.	Vice mayor
1		Dr. Soekandar	1945	1947	Independent	5		N/A
2		M. Pamoedji	20 October 1947	29 December 1949	Independent	6		N/A
3		R. Soedarsono Poespowardojo	1950	1954	Independent	7		N/A
4		M. Soetimbul Kromohadisoerjo	1954	1954	Independent	8		N/A
5		M. Ng. Arsid Kromohadisoerjo	1954	1961	Independent	9		N/A
6		R. Soedibjo	1961	1968	Independent	10		N/A
7		Chabib Sjarbini; S.H.	1968	1974	Independent	11		N/A
8		R. Sochartono; BA.	1974	1979	Independent	12		N/A
9		H. R. Moch. Samioedin	1979	1984	Independent	13		N/A
9		H. R. Moch. Samioedin	1984	1989	Independent	14		N/A
10		Wadijono; S.H.	1989	1994	Independent	15		N/A
11		H. Tegoeh Soejono; SH, BA	1994	1999	Independent	16		N/A
11		H. Tegoeh Soejono; SH, BA	1999	2003	Independent	17		
12		H. Abdul Gani Suhartono; M.M.	2003	2008	PDI-P	18		Hendro Suwono
12		H. Abdul Gani Suhartono; M.M.	2008	2013	PDI-P	19 (2008)		Masud Yunus
13		Drs. K. H. Mas’ud Yunus	8 December 2013	16 May 2018	PDI-P	20 (2013)	(Note: Detained by the KPK since 9 May 2018 because he was named a suspect for alleged bribery case regarding the discussion of changes to the Regional Budget at the Department of Public Works and Spatial Planning of Mojokerto City in 2017.)	Suyitno
–		Suyitno (Acting Officer)	16 May 2018	8 December 2018	Independent	20 (2013)		N/A
–		Harlistyati (Daily executive)	8 December 2018	10 December 2018	Independent	–		N/A
14		Ika Puspitasari	10 December 2018	10 December 2023	Independent	21 (2018)		Achmad Rizal Zakaria (2018–2021)
–		Mohammad Ali Kuncoro (Acting)	10 December 2023	20 February 2025	Independent	–		N/A
(14)		Ika Puspitasari	20 February 2025	Incumbent	Independent	22 (2024)		Rachman Sidharta Arisandi

== See also ==
- Mojokerto
- List of incumbent regional heads and deputy regional heads in East Java
