= 2024 Batu mayoral election =

- 27 November 2024
- Turnout: 81.71%
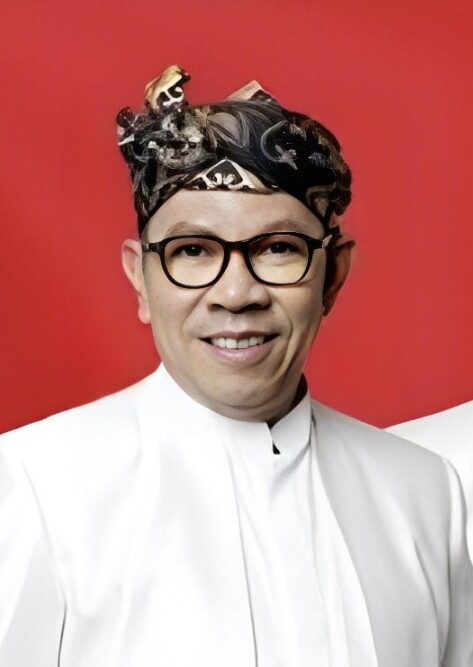

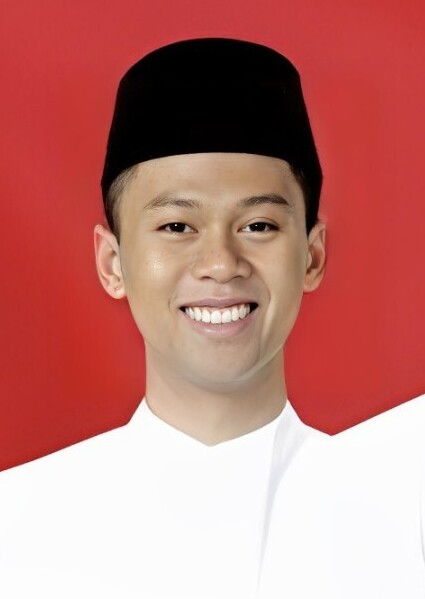

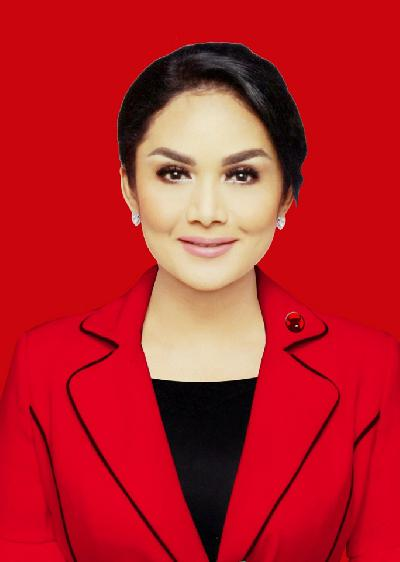
Candidate	Nurochman	Firhando Gumelar	Krisdayanti
Party	PKB	Golkar	PDI-P
Running mate	Heli Suyanto	Rudi	Kresna Dewanata Phrosakh
Popular vote	65,684	38,610	26,234
Percentage	50.32%	29.58%	20.10%
Mayor before election
Aries Agung Paweai (acting)
Independent
Elected mayor
Nurochman
PKB

The 2024 Batu mayoral election was held on 27 November 2024 as part of nationwide local elections to elect the mayor and vice mayor of Batu City for a five-year term. The previous election was held in 2017. Nurochman of the National Awakening Party (PKB) won the election, receiving 50% of the vote. Golkar's Firhando Gumelar placed second with 29%, followed by singer and House of Representatives member, Krisdayanti of the Indonesian Democratic Party of Struggle (PDI-P), who received 20% of the vote.

== Electoral system ==
The election, like other local elections in 2024, follow the first-past-the-post system where the candidate with the most votes wins the election, even if they do not win a majority. It is possible for a candidate to run uncontested, in which case the candidate is still required to win a majority of votes "against" an "empty box" option. Should the candidate fail to do so, the election will be repeated on a later date.

== Candidates ==
According to electoral regulations, in order to qualify for the election, candidates were required to secure support from a political party or a coalition of parties controlling 10% percent of the valid votes during the last mayoral election.

The previously-elected mayor, Dewanti Rumpoko, is eligible to run for a re-election.

=== Declared ===
On 30 July 2024, the Indonesian Democratic Party of Struggle instructed Krisdayanti, one of Indonesia's most successful singers, to become a candidate for the Batu mayoral election. Krisdayanti's nomination was officially confirmed by the party on 22 August 2024. In the same evening, she suddenly announced through Instagram story that she would drop out from the race. However, a few days after, she rescinded her resignation and decided to proceed with her candidacy.

Candidate from PDIP
Krisdayanti	Kresna Dewanata Phrosakh
for Mayor	for Vice Mayor
Singer, Member of the House of Representatives for East Java V (2019–2024)	Member of the House of Representatives for East Java V (2014–2024)
Parties
9 / 30 (30%) PDIP (6 seats); NasDem (3 seats)

=== Potential ===
The following are individuals who have either been publicly mentioned as a potential candidate by a political party in the DPRD, publicly declared their candidacy with press coverage, or considered as a potential candidate by media outlets:

- Dewanti Rumpoko, previously-elected mayor and wife of the third Mayor of Batu, Eddy Rumpoko.
- Ganis Rumpoko, daughter of Dewanti and Eddy Rumpoko.

== Results ==
Candidate	Running mate	Party	Votes	%
Nurochman	Heli Suyanto	National Awakening Party	65,684	50.32
Firhando Gumelar	Rudi	Golkar	38,610	29.58
Krisdayanti	Kresna Dewanata Phrosakh	Indonesian Democratic Party of Struggle	26,234	20.10
Total			130,528	100.00
Valid votes			130,528	95.69
Invalid/blank votes			5,878	4.31
Total votes			136,406	100.00
Registered voters/turnout			166,942	81.71
Source: KPU
