= Mayor of Batu =

- Wali Kota Batu
- Coat of arms of Batu

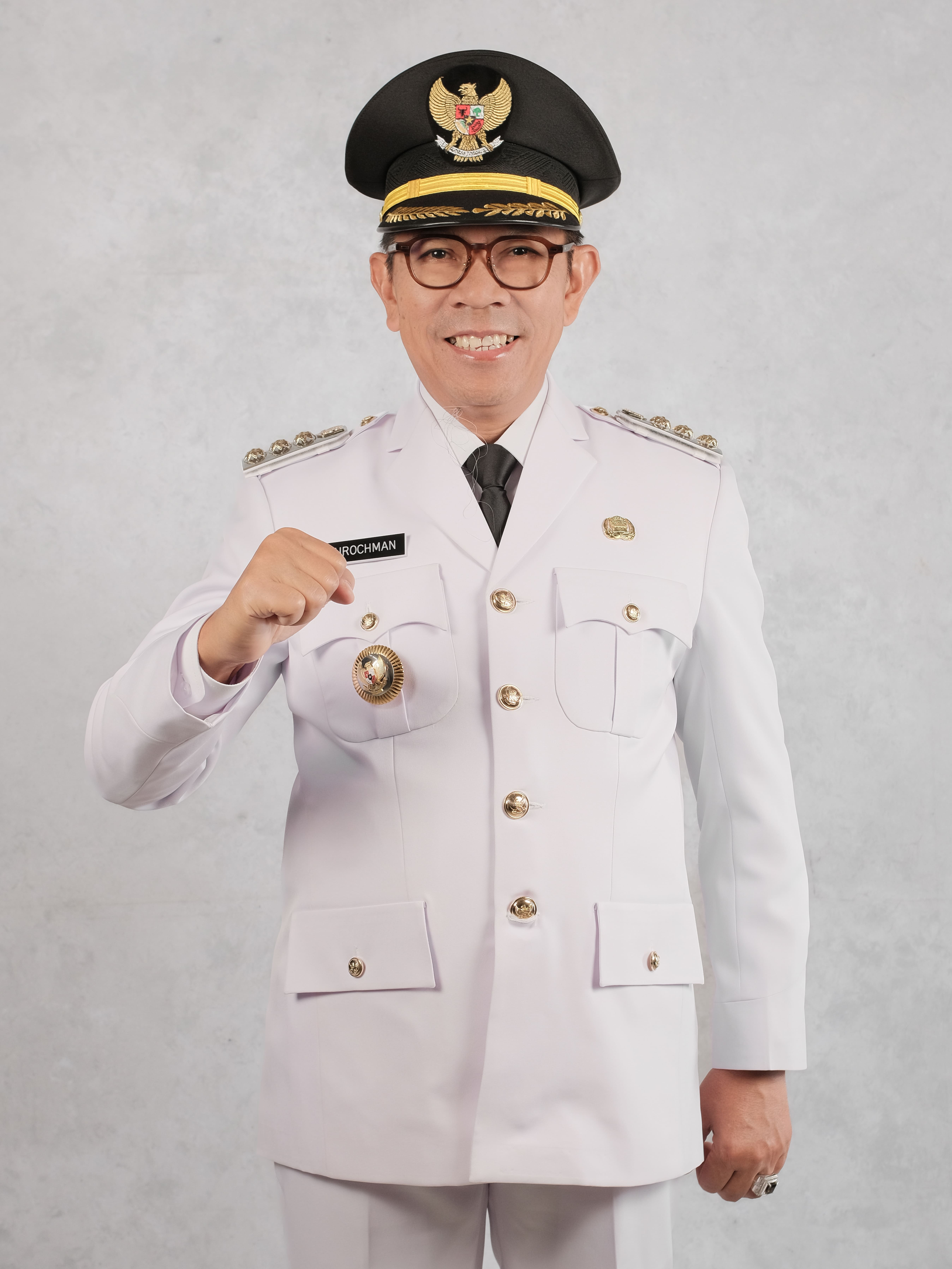
- Incumbent; Nurochman since 20 February 2025
- Term length: 5 years
- Inaugural holder: Imam Kabul
- Formation: 2001
- Website: www.batukota.go.id

Mayor of Batu is the head of the second-level region who holds the government in Batu together with the Deputy Mayor and 30 members of the Batu City Regional House of Representatives. The mayor and deputy mayor of Batu are elected through general elections held every 5 years. The first mayor of Batu was Imam Kabul, who governed the city period from 2001 to 2002.

== List ==
The following is a list of Mayors of Batu, Indonesia from time to time.

Num.	Portrait	Mayor	Beginning of office	End of term	Period	Vice	Note:
—		Dr. H.M. Imam Kabul; M.Si. M.Hum.	22 October 2001	25 November 2002	—	—	(Note: As Acting Mayor)
1		Dr. H.M. Imam Kabul; M.Si. M.Hum.	25 November 2002	26 August 2007	1	Muhammad Khudlori	(Note: Died in office)
—		Drs. Muhammad Khudlori	26 August 2007	20 September 2007	1	—	(Note: As Acting Mayor)
2		Drs. Muhammad Khudlori	20 September 2007	26 November 2007	1	—	
—		Drs. Soerjanto Soebandi; M.M.	26 November 2007	24 December 2007	—	—	(Note: As Acting Mayor)
3		H. Eddy Rumpoko	24 December 2007	24 December 2012	2	Budiono	
3		H. Eddy Rumpoko	26 December 2012	27 December 2017	3	Punjul Santoso	
4		Dra. Hj. Dewanti Rumpoko; M.Si	27 December 2017	27 December 2022	3	Punjul Santoso	
—		Drs. Zadim Efisiensi (Daily executive)	28 December 2022	19 January 2023	—	—	
—		Dr. Aries Agung Paewai; S.STP., M.M. (Acting)	19 January 2023	20 February 2025	—	—	
5		Nurochman S.H., M.H.	20 February 2025	Incumbent	4	Heli Suyanto S.H., M.H.	

Note

Non-Partisan/Government Assignment
Indonesian Democratic Party of Struggle
National Awakening Party

== See also ==
- Batu City
- List of incumbent regional heads and deputy regional heads in East Java
