= Mayor of Probolinggo =

- Wali Kota Probolinggo
- Coat of arms of Probolinggo

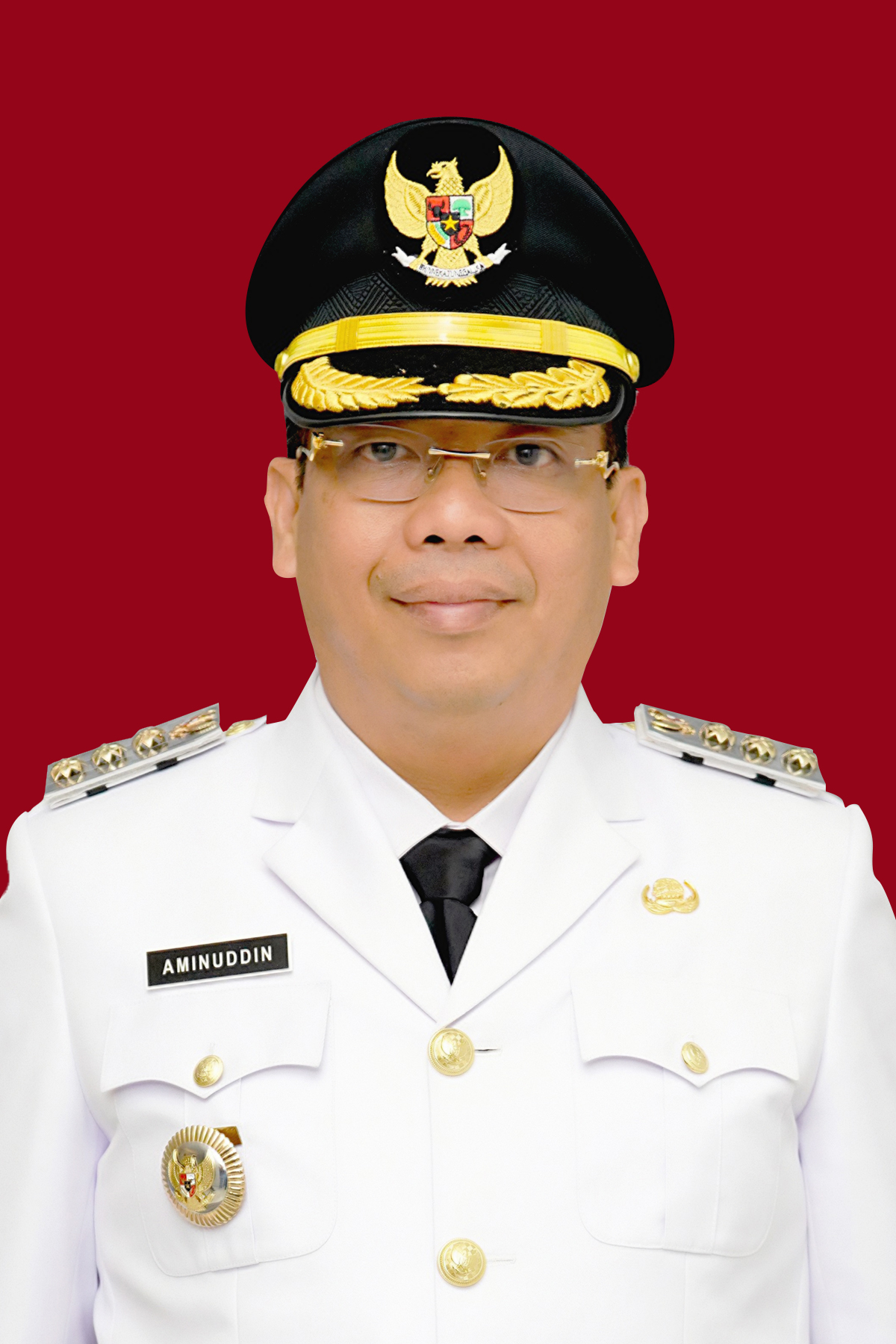
- Incumbent; Aminuddin since 20 February 2025
- Term length: 5 years
- Inaugural holder: Ferdinand Edmond Meijer
- Formation: 1929
- Website: Official website

Mayor of Probolinggo is the head of the second-level region who holds the government in Probolinggo together with the Vice Mayor and 30 members of the Probolinggo City Regional House of Representatives. The mayor and vice mayor of Probolinggo are elected through general elections held every 5 years. The first mayor of Probolinggo was Ferdinand Edmond Meijer, who governed the city period from 1929 to 1937.

== List ==
The following is a list of the names of the Mayors of Probolinggo from time to time.

Dutch East Indies Period
| Num. | Portrait | Mayor | Beginning of office | End of Term | Political Party / Faction | Period | Note. | Vice mayor |
|---|---|---|---|---|---|---|---|---|
| 1 | | Ferdinand Edmond Meijer | 1929 | 1937 | Independent | 1 | | N/A |
| 2 | | L.A. de Graaff | 1937 | 1940 | Independent | 2 | | N/A |
| 3 | | L. Noë | 1940 | 1942 | Independent | 3 | | N/A |
Japanese Occupation Period
| Num. | Portrait | Mayor | Beginning of office | End of Term | Political Party / Faction | Period | Note. | Vice mayor |
| 1 | | R. Soedono | 1943 | 1945 | Independent | 4 | | N/A |
Mayor of Probolinggo
| Num. | Portrait | Mayor | Beginning of office | End of Term | Political Party / Faction | Period | Note. | Vice mayor |
| 1 | | Gatot | 1950 | 1959 | Independent | 5 | | N/A |
| 2 | | Nurudin Madhar Iljas | 1959 | 1961 | Independent | 6 | | N/A |
| 3 | | Soendaroe Prawiro Adiredjo | 1961 | 1965 | Independent | 7 | | N/A |
| 4 | | Sawal Sastrosoemarto | 1965 | 1966 | Independent | 8 | | N/A |
| 5 | | M. Soeparto | 1966 | 1967 | Independent | 9 | | N/A |
| 6 | | Asdiroen Wirjokoesoemo | 1967 | 1968 | Independent | 10 | | N/A |
| 7 | | Soenarto S. | 1968 | 1970 | Independent | 11 | | N/A |
| 8 | | Harto Harjono | 1970 | 1975 | Independent | 12 | | N/A |
| 8 | | Harto Harjono | 1975 | 1980 | Independent | 13 | | N/A |
| 9 | | Soesanto Hariasmoro | 1980 | 1981 | Independent | 14 | | N/A |
| 10 | | R. Djoewito Moeljodisastro | 1981 | 1985 | Independent | 14 | | N/A |
| 11 | | Latief Anwar | 1985 | 1990 | Independent | 15 | | N/A |
| 12 | | Sarwanto | 1990 | 1992 | Independent | 16 | | N/A |
| 13 | | Soeprapto | 1993 | 1998 | Independent | 17 | | N/A |
| 14 | | Banadi Eko | 1998 | 2004 | Independent | 18 | | N/A |
| 15 | | M. Buchori | 2004 | 2009 | PDI-P | 19 | | Bandyk Sutrisno |
| 15 | | M. Buchori | 2009 | 2014 | PDI-P | 20 (2008) | | Bandyk Sutrisno |
| 16 | | Rukmini Buchori | 28 January 2014 | 28 January 2019 | PDI-P | 21 (2013) | | M. Suhadak |
| 17 | | Hadi Zainal Abidin | 30 January 2019 | 30 January 2024 | PKB | 22 (2018) | | Moch. Soufis Subri (2019–2020) |
| 18 | | Aminuddin | 20 February 2025 | Incumbent | Gerindra | 23 (2024) | | Ina Dwi Lestari |

== Temporary replacement ==
In the government stack, a regional head who submits himself to leave or temporarily resigns from his position to the central government, then the Minister of Home Affairs prepares a replacement who is a bureaucrat in the regional government or even a vice mayor, including when the mayor's position is in a transition period.

| Portrait | Mayor | Party | Beginning | End | Duration | Period | Definitive | Ref. |
|---|---|---|---|---|---|---|---|---|
| | Bambang Agus Suwignyo (Daily executive) | Independent | 28 January 2019 | 30 January 2019 | 2 days | – | Transition (2019) | |
| | Nurkholis (Acting) | Independent | 30 January 2024 | 24 September 2024 | 238 days | – | Transition (2024–2025) | |
| | Mochamad Taufik Kurniawan (Acting) | Independent | 24 September 2024 | 20 February 2025 | 149 days | – | Transition (2024–2025) | |

== See also ==
- Probolinggo
- List of incumbent regional heads and deputy regional heads in East Java
