= Museum Angkut =

Museum Angkut Transportation Museum

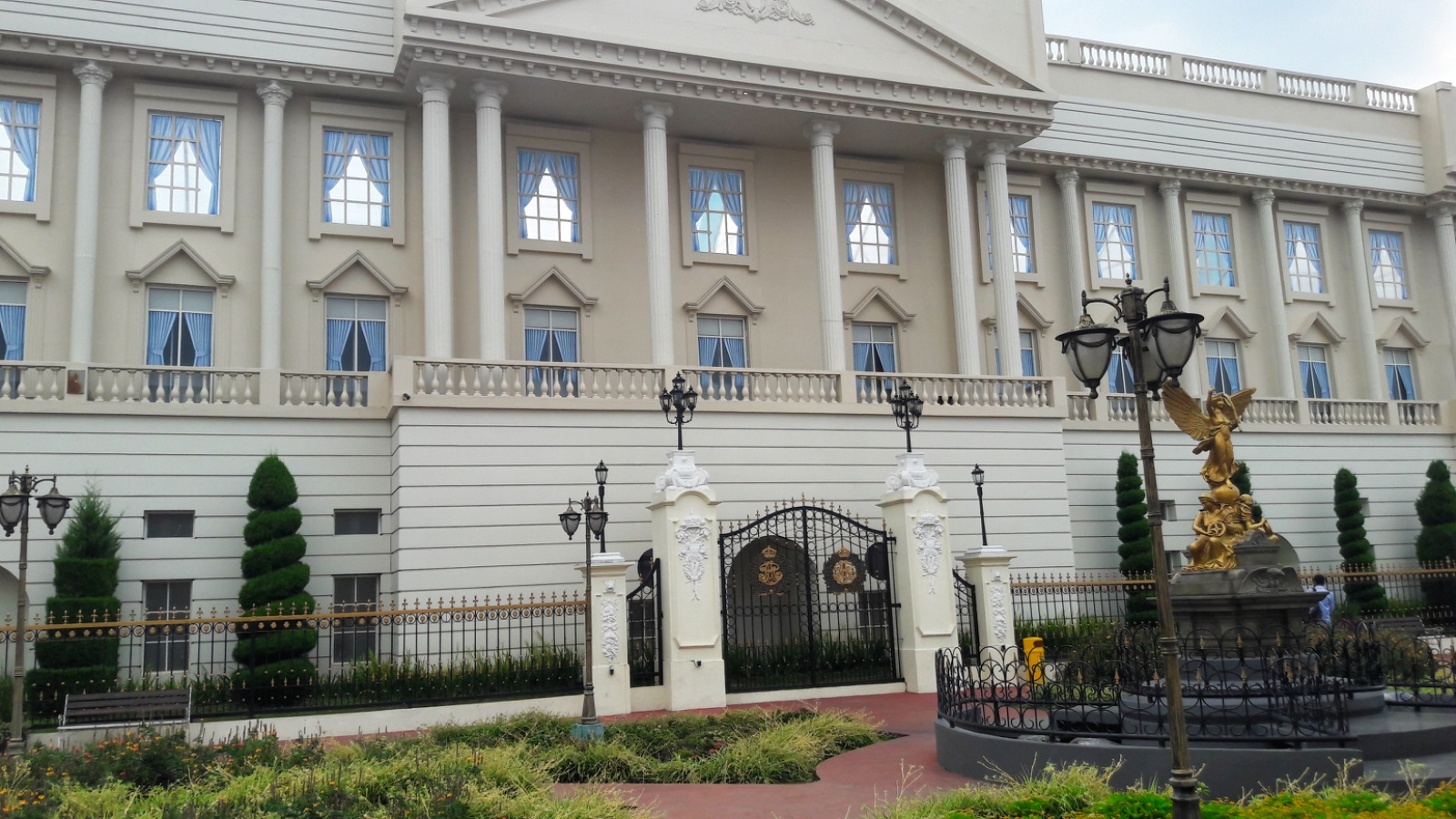
- Established: 9 March 2014; 12 years ago
- Location: Batu, East Java, Indonesia
- Coordinates: 7.87906°S 112.51986°E
- Type: Transport museum
- Visitors: 230,467 (2016)
- Owner: Jawa Timur Park Group
- Website: Official website of Museum Angkut

Museum Angkut (English: Transportation Museum) is a transport museum located in Batu, East Java, Indonesia, and located on the hillside of Mount Panderman, part of Mount Kawi-Butak. The museum has more than 300 collections of types of traditional to modern transportation. The museum is divided into several zones decorated with the background of building models from the continents of Asia, Europe to America. Especially in the European Zone, it's set by 1800-1900s French-style with various vintage European cars. Museum Angkut is the first all-type mode of transportation museum in Indonesia and Southeast Asia.

In addition to vintage cars, one of the newest transport collections is the Tucuxi electric car owned by former Indonesian minister of BUMN and owner of Jawa Pos Group, Dahlan Iskan who had previously had an accident on a road located on the slopes of Mount Lawu in Magetan when tested. In the museum, there is also a Flight Simulator vehicle located on the third floor of the main museum building.

Museum Angkut is owned and operated by Jawa Timur Park Group which also has Batu Secret Zoo, Batu Night Spectacular (BNS), Eco Green Park and Wildlife Museum. The museum was opened on 9 March 2014.

== Gallery ==
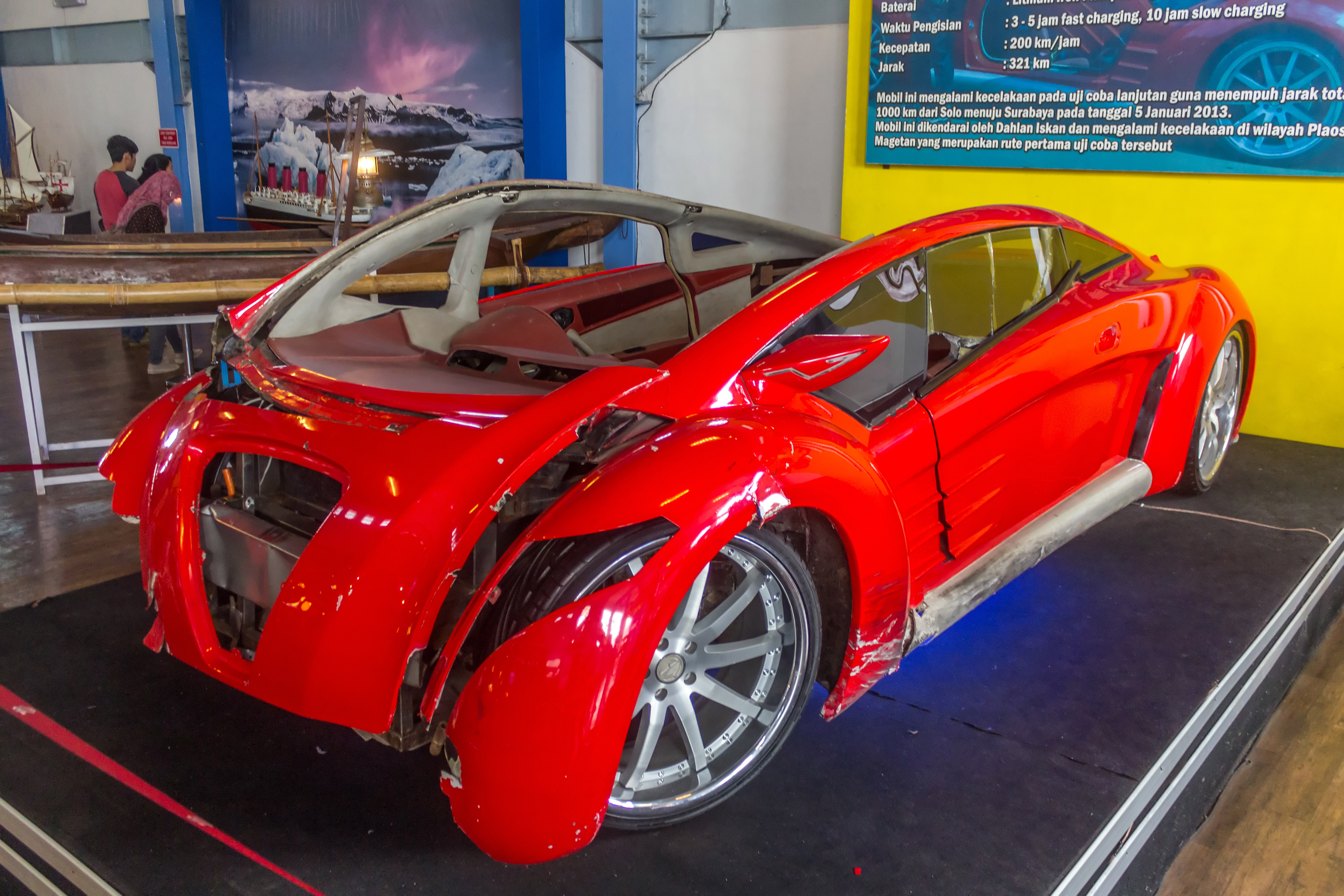
Damaged Tucuxi ('the Dolphin') prototype at Museum Angkut

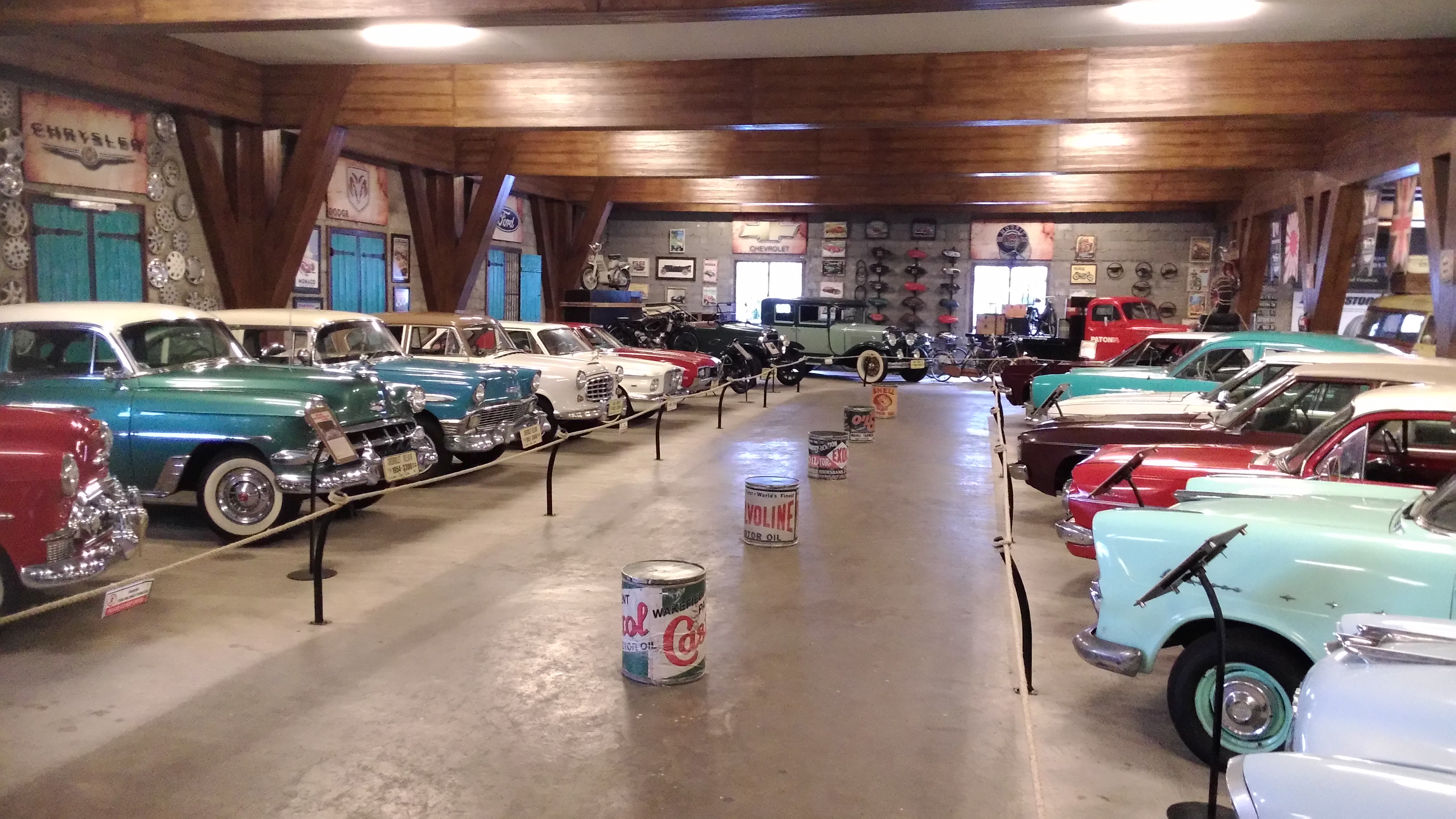
Interior of Museum Angkut

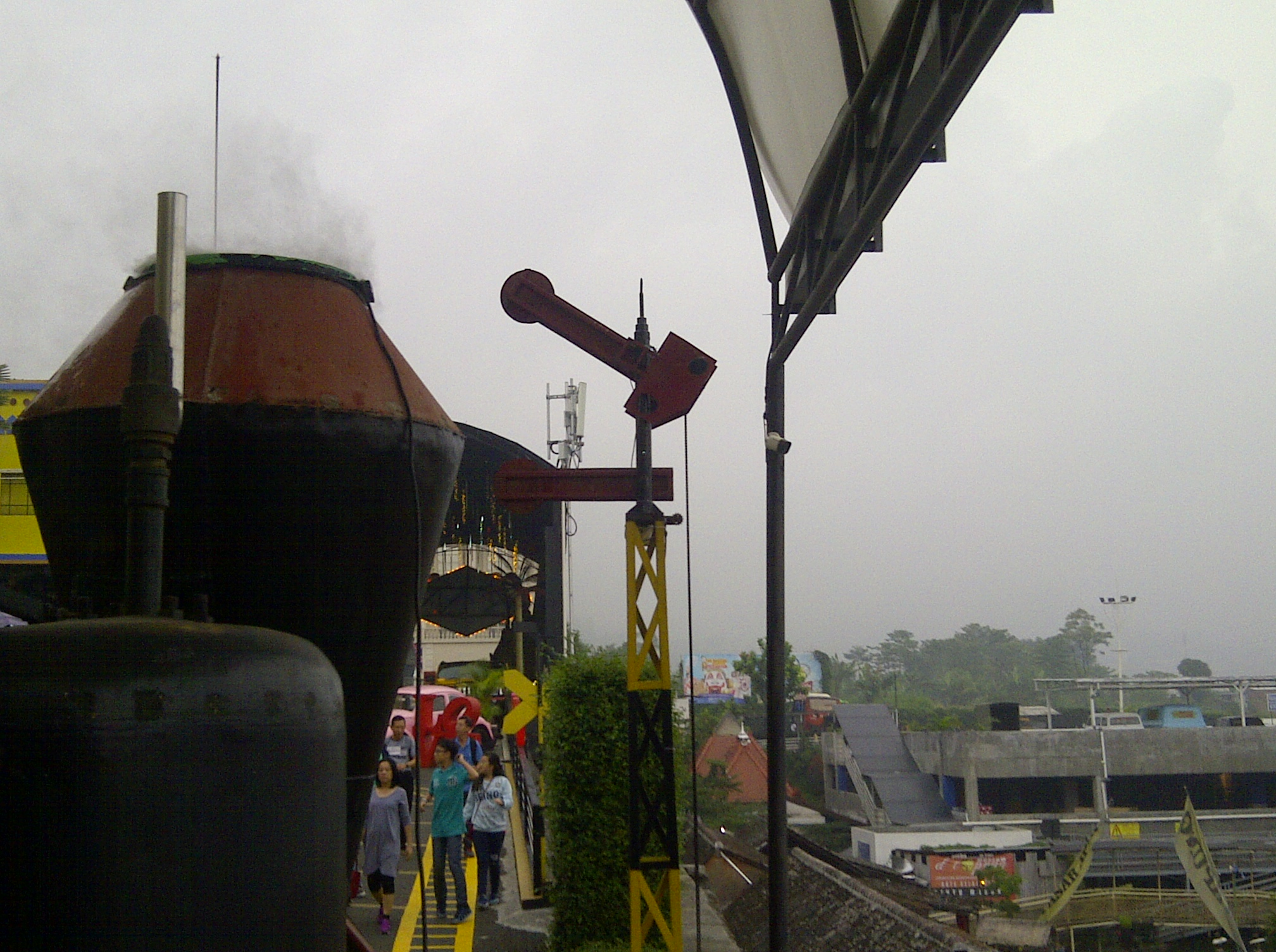
Replica of Indonesia's semaphore signalling in Museum Angkut

== See also ==
- Jawa Timur Park
- List of transport museums
