= Jawa Timur Park =

Amusement park in Batu, East Java, Indonesia

Jatim Park

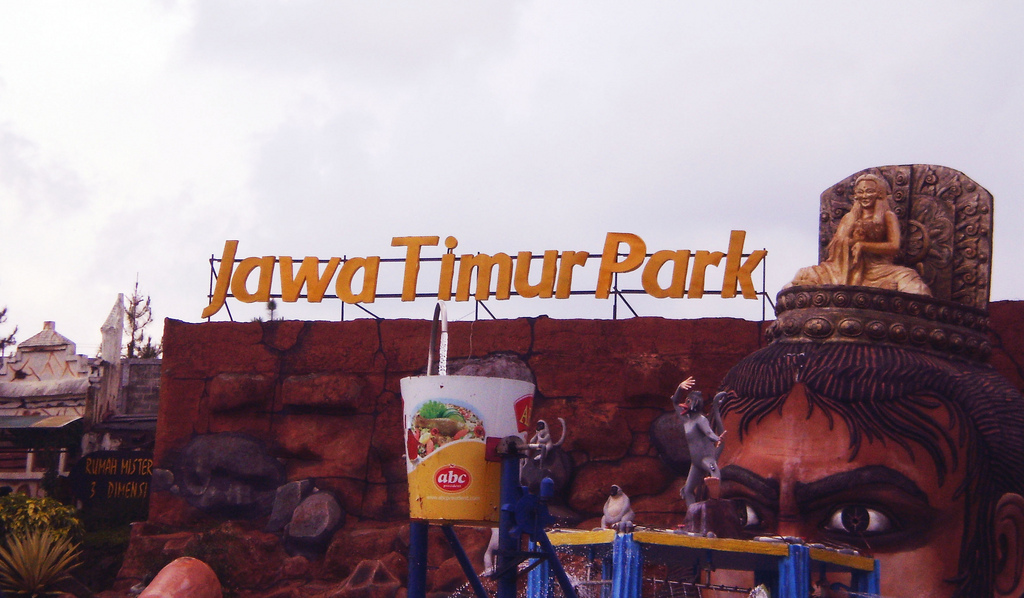
- Interactive map of Jatim Park
- Location: Batu, East Java, Indonesia
- Coordinates: 7.88412°S 112.52491°E
- Opened: 9 December 2001; 24 years ago
- Owner: Jawa Timur Park Group
- Operated by: Jawa Timur Park
- Theme: Amusement parks, education parks, and resorts
- Operating season: Year-round
- Website: jtp.id

Jawa Timur Park, commonly known as Jatim Park, East Java Park, Eastern Java Park, or JTP, is a complex of recreational and learning parks located in Batu, East Java, Indonesia. The complex has 3 parks, Jatim Park 1, Jatim Park 2, and Jatim Park 3. Jatim Park is one of the tourism icons of East Java and one of the most famous amusement parks in Indonesia.

== History ==
Jatim Park was founded in 2001 by Paul Sendjojo. Jawa Timur Park Group has been working with the Department of Education and Culture, Municipality of Batu to ensure that every educational collection displayed is guaranteed quality. In addition, Jatim Park Group is also working with the Ministry of Environment and Forestry in developing Jawa Timur Park 2 content. This park also has the most extensive area, which is 22 hectares.

In 2016, a human body museum with the name "The Bagong Adventure" was inaugurated. This 1.4-hectare museum is the only human body museum in Indonesia. The museum is not only from the museum's content about the human body, but also from a collection of cadavers, or preserved human organs. The Human Body Museum is the largest and rarest human body museum with cadaver collections in Southeast Asia. In addition to the Human Body Museum, Jawa Timur Park Group recorded another record with the existence of Museum Angkut as the first and largest transportation museum in Asia. The automotive collection of more than 300 species spread over an area of 3.8 hectares.

In April 2017, Jawa Timur Park Group also officially cooperated with the Indonesian Institute of Sciences (LIPI) to make adjustments to the data collection and management system of flora and fauna in each of the agreed-upon parks.

== Jatim Park 1 ==
Jatim Park 1 has 36 amusement lands, including a giant swimming pool (with a background of the statue of Ken Dedes, Ken Arok, and Mpu Gandring), a spinning coaster, and a drop zone. Educational lands that are the centre of attention include the Volcano and the Nusantara Gallery which also has agro plants, dioramas of endangered animals, and miniatures of temples. Jatim Park 1 is located at Jalan Kartika No. 2, which is adjacent to the Flower Club Resort Hotel.

== Jatim Park 2 ==
Slightly different from Jatim Park 1 which is more intended as a playground and entertainment, Jatim Park 2 is more showing a learning park than a playground. Jatim Park 2 carries the concept of learning natural sciences, biology, and animals that are presented with a background according to their habitat. Jatim Park 2 consists of wildlife museum, Batu Secret Zoo, and Pohon Inn Hotel. Jatim Park 2 is located at Jalan Oro-oro Ombo No. 9, which is adjacent to the Batu Night Spectacular.

== Jatim Park 3 ==
The location of Jatim Park 3 is in Beji, District Junrejo. Jatim Park 3 carries the concept of a playground as well as education about ancient animals including dinosaurs. Visitors will be shown life from the dinosaurs and geologic period, from the beginning of civilization until the time after the extinction of the dinosaurs. The geologic era parks is Permian, Triassic, Jurassic, Cretaceous and Ice Age epochs which became the age of dinosaur extinction because temperatures at this time were so extreme and frozen. East Java Park also has tours of the cultures of various worlds in each house that has architecture according to the culture of the country, known as the 5 periods culture park (Wisata Budaya 5 zaman). Jatim Park also has a World Music Gallery (Museum Musik Dunia), Fun Tech Plaza, The Legend Star and Millennial Glow Garden.

== See also ==
- Museum Angkut
- List of amusement parks in Asia
