= Nurochman =

Indonesian politician (born 1969)

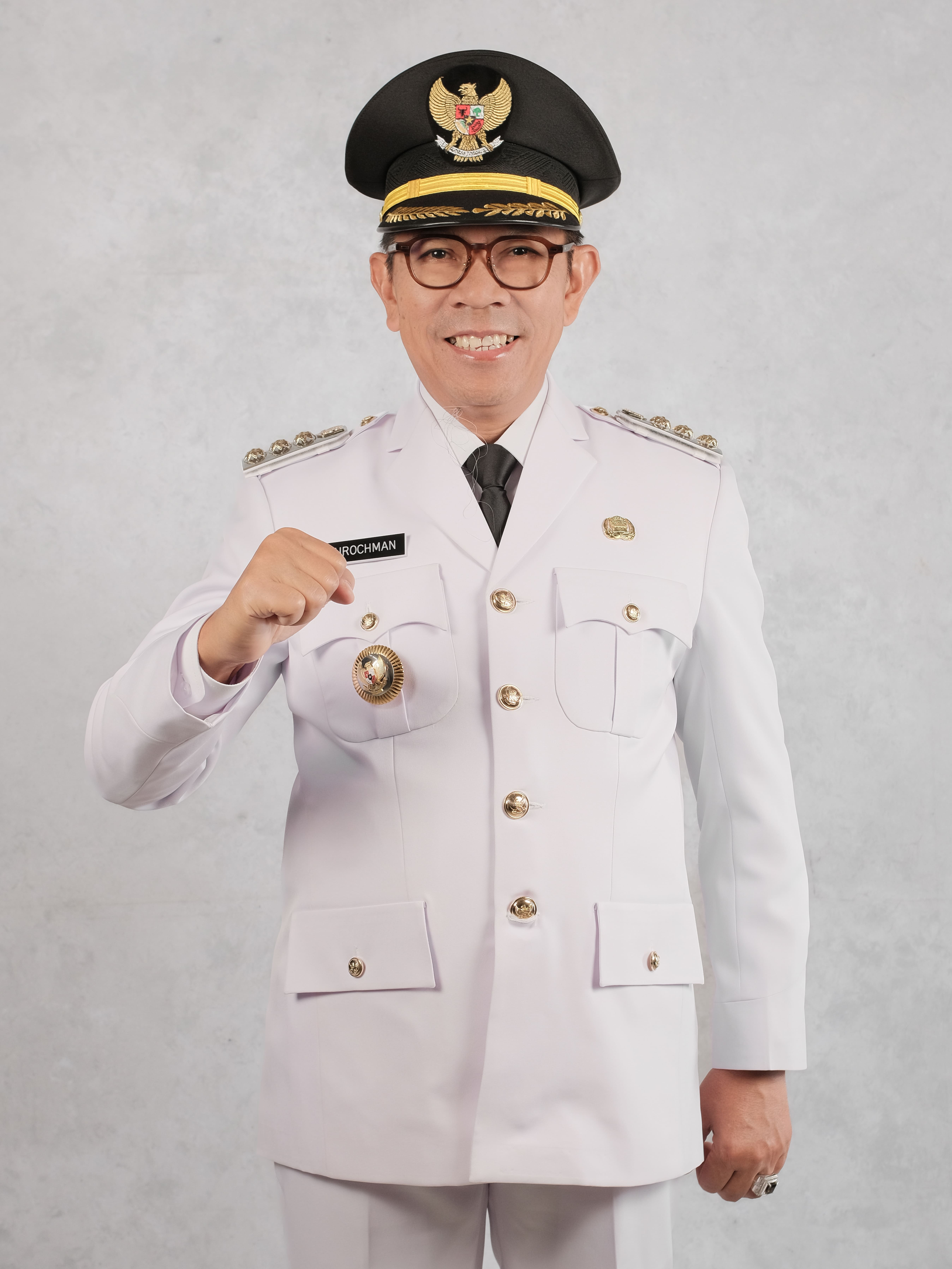

5th Mayor of Batu
- Incumbent
- Assumed office 20 February 2025
- President: Prabowo Subianto
- Governor: Khofifah Indar Parawansa
- Deputy: Heli Suyanto
- Preceded by: Dewanti Rumpoko; Aries Agung Paewai (Act.)

Personal details
- Born: March 7, 1969 (age 57) Malang, East Java
- Party: National Awakening Party
- Spouse: Siti Fauziyah
- Education: Islamic University of Malang (S.H., M.H.)
- Profession: Politician

Nurochman or also familiarly called Cak Nur (born 7 March 1969) is an Indonesian politician from the National Awakening Party who served as Mayor of Batu for the 2025–2030 term. He served since 20 February 2025 after being inaugurated by President Prabowo Subianto at the Istana Negara, Jakarta. Previously, he served as Deputy Chairman of the Batu City Regional House of Representatives for two consecutive terms, namely 2014–2019 and 2019–2024.

== Education ==
Nurochman spent his childhood and completed his elementary education at Sumberejo Elementary School (1976–1982). Then, he continued his studies at MTs Hasyim Asy'ari Batu (1982–1985) and MAN 2 Malang (1985–1988). Several decades later in 2014, he studied at the Faculty of Law, Islamic University of Malang and obtained a Bachelor of Law degree in 2018. After graduating with a bachelor's degree, he immediately continued his Master of Law studies at the same university and obtained a Master of Law degree in 2021.

== Organizational History ==
Nurochman began his organizational experience as a member of the Batu City KNPI in 1991. He also served as Chairman of the Batu City IPNU PC from 1993 to 1997. He then served as Chairman of the Sumberejo BPD from 2006 to 2007.

In addition, he began to be interested in entering the world of politics. Cak Nur solidified his steps by joining the PKB. At that time, Cak Nur immediately received the trust to become the Secretary of the PKB Batu City for the 2004–2009 period. Since 2010, Cak Nur has been trusted to become the Chairman of the PKB Batu City. His persistence in politics, made him successful in holding a position as a member of the Batu City DPRD . During that time, he was also trusted to serve as Deputy Chairman of the Batu City Regional People's Representative Council for the 2014–2019 and 2019–2024 terms. In 2024, he succeeded in bringing PKB to win the most votes in Batu City.

== Career ==
=== Becoming Mayor of Batu ===
On 28 August 2024, Cak Nur officially registered to participate in the 2024 Batu mayoral election. He was accompanied by Heli Suyanto, a Gerindra politician, and was supported by PKB and Gerindra, and supported by PSI.

The Cak Nur–Mas Heli pair successfully won the 2024 Batu mayoral election with the support of 65.684 votes or 50,32 percent of the total valid votes, surpassing two other candidates, namely Firhando Gumelar – Rudi and Kris Dayanti–Kresna Dewanata Phrosakh. They were officially declared the winners by the Batu City Regional General Election Commission on January 9, 2025, in an event held at The Singhasari Resort.

Political offices
Preceded by Dewanti Rumpoko; Aries Agung Paewai (Act.)	Mayor of Batu; 2025–present	Succeeded by Incumbent
