= Batu City Regional House of Representatives =

Batu City Regional House of Representatives Dewan Perwakilan Rakyat Daerah Kota Batu
- 2024–2029 period

Type
- Type: Unicameral
- Term limits: 5 years

History
- New session started: 30 August 2024

Leadership
- Speaker: Muhammad Didik Subiyanto, PKB since 18 October 2024
- Deputy Speaker: Punjul Santoso, PDI-P since 18 October 2024
- Deputy Speaker: Ludi Tanarto, PKS since 18 October 2024

Structure
- Seats: 30
- Political groups: PDI-P (6) NasDem (2) PKB (6) Democratic (1) PAN (2) Golkar (4) Gerindra (4) PKS (5)

Elections
- Voting system: Open list
- Last election: 14 February 2024

Meeting place
- Batu City Regional House of Representatives Building; Hasanuddin Street; Junrejo, Junrejo, Batu; East Java, Indonesia

Website
- dprd.batukota.go.id

The Batu City Regional House of Representatives (Indonesian: Dewan Perwakilan Rakyat Daerah Kota Batu, DPRD Kota Batu) is the unicameral municipal legislature of Batu, East Java, Indonesia. It has 30 members, who are elected every five years, simultaneously with the national legislative election.

== Legal basis ==
The legislature for Batu was formed under Law Number 11 of 2001, which organized city governments within the province.

== General election results ==
=== 2024 Indonesian legislative election ===
The official valid votes received by political parties contesting the 2024 Indonesian legislative election in each electoral district (constituency) for members of the Batu City Regional House of Representatives are as follows.

2024 Indonesian legislative election results

Electoral district	PKB	Gerindra	PDI-P	Golkar	NasDem	Labour	Gelora	PKS	PKN	Hanura	Garuda	PAN	PBB	Democratic	PSI	Perindo	PPP	Ummat	Valid votes
Batu City 1	7,197	2,856	5,305	5,249	2,169	76	175	2,293	32	62	22	3,203	35	2,063	517	37	375	26	31,692
Batu City 2	7,986	3,826	3,412	4,135	2,816	85	214	3,189	17	33	33	2,284	28	2,239	369	44	315	113	31,138
Batu City 3	6,217	6,643	8,640	5,063	2,341	86	169	3,349	70	30	23	3,736	45	4,935	208	33	438	79	42,105
Batu City 4	5,770	4,206	7,543	2,648	730	56	824	9,585	12	11	25	1,944	19	950	371	54	141	57	34,946
Total	27,170	17,531	24,900	17,095	8,056	303	1,382	18,416	131	136	103	11,167	127	10,187	1,465	168	1,269	275	139,881
Source: General Elections Commission of Indonesia

== Composition ==
The following is the composition of members of the Batu City Regional House of Representatives in the last five periods.

Party	Total seats				
Party	2004–2009	2009–2014	2014–2019	2019–2024	2024–2029
PKB seats	4	▼0	▲4	▲5	▲6
Gerindra seats		0	▲4	4	4
PDI-P seats	5	5	5	▲6	6
Golkar seats	5	▼3	3	▲4	4
NasDem seats			1	▲3	▼2
PKS seats	1	1	1	▲4	▲5
Hanura seats		3	▼1	▼0	0
PAN seats	2	▲3	3	▼2	2
Demokrat seats	4	▼3	3	▼2	▼1
Sarikat seats	1	▼0			
PNBK seats	1	▼0			
PDS seats	1	▼0			
PNIM seats	1	1			
PPIB seats	0	▲2			
Barnas seats		1			
PKNU seats		1			
Patriot seats	0	▲1			
PKPB seats	0	▲1			
Total Seats	25	25	25	▲30	30
Total Party	10	▲12	▼9	▼8	8

== Electoral District ==
In the 2019 Legislative Election, the Batu City Regional House of Representatives election was divided into 4 electoral districts as follows:

Electoral District Name	Electoral District Area	Number of Seats
BATU CITY 1	Batu A (Ngaglik, Pesanggrahan, Sidomulyo, Songgokerto, Sumberejo)	7
BATU CITY 2	Batu B (Oro-oro Ombo, Sisir, Temas)	7
BATU CITY 3	Junrejo	7
BATU CITY 4	Bumiaji	9
TOTAL		30

In the 2024 Legislative Election, the Batu City Regional House of Representatives election was divided into 4 electoral districts as follows:

Electoral District Name	Electoral District Area	Number of Seats
BATU CITY 1	Batu A (Ngaglik, Pesanggrahan, Sidomulyo, Songgokerto, Sumberejo)	7
BATU CITY 2	Batu B (Oro-oro Ombo, Sisir, Temas)	7
BATU CITY 3	Bumiaji	9
BATU CITY 4	Junrejo	7
TOTAL		30

== See also ==
- East Java Regional House of Representatives
- Batu
- East Java
