= Masud Yunus =

Indonesian politician (1952–2020)

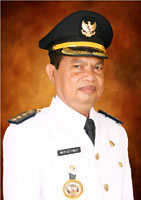
Yunus

Mas'ud Yunus (1 January 1952 – 27 August 2020) was an Indonesian politician. He was born in Mojokerto, East Java. Yunus was a member of the Democratic Party of Struggle. Between 2013 and 2018, he was mayor of Mojokerto.

Yunus died from COVID-19 at a hospital in Mojokerto on 27 August 2020, during the COVID-19 pandemic in Indonesia aged 68.
