= Mojokerto City Regional House of Representatives =

Mojokerto City Regional House of Representatives Dewan Perwakilan Rakyat Daerah Kota Mojokerto
- 2024–2029 period
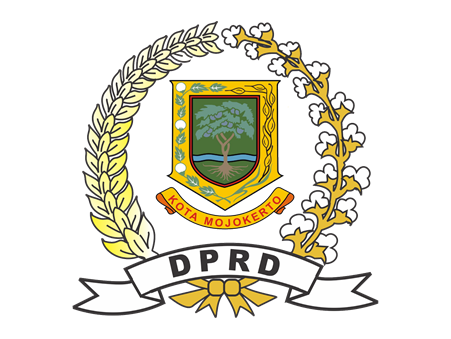

Type
- Type: Unicameral

History
- Founded: 1950
- New session started: 27 August 2024

Leadership
- Speaker: Ery Purwanti, PDI-P since 6 November 2024
- Deputy Speaker: Hadi Prayitno, PKB since 28 October 2024
- Deputy Speaker: Arie Hernowo, NasDem since 28 October 2024

Structure
- Seats: 25
- Political groups: Government (21): Gerindra (2); PDI-P (5); Golkar (2); NasDem (3); PKS (3); PAN (2); Democratic (3); PPP (1); Opposition (4): PKB (4)
- Length of term: 5 years

Elections
- Voting system: Open list proportional representation
- Last election: 14 February 2024

Meeting place
- Mojokerto City Regional House of Representatives Building; Gajah Mada Street Number 145; Balongsari, Magersari, Mojokerto; East Java, Indonesia

Website
- dprd.mojokertokota.go.id

The Mojokerto City Regional House of Representatives (Indonesian: Dewan Perwakilan Rakyat Daerah Kota Mojokerto, DPRD Kota Mojokerto) is the unicameral municipal legislature of Mojokerto, East Java, Indonesia. It has 25 members, who are elected every five years, simultaneously with the national legislative election.

== Legal basis ==
The legislature for Mojokerto was formed along with those of other cities in East Java under Law Number 17 of 1950, which organized city governments within the province.

== General election results ==
=== 2024 Indonesian legislative election ===
The official valid votes received by political parties contesting the 2024 Indonesian legislative election in each electoral district (constituency) for members of the Mojokerto City Regional House of Representatives are as follows.

2024 Indonesian legislative election results

Electoral district	PKB	Gerindra	PDI-P	Golkar	NasDem	Labour	Gelora	PKS	PKN	Hanura	Garuda	PAN	PBB	Democratic	PSI	Perindo	PPP	Ummat	Valid votes
Mojokerto City 1	5,442	2,364	10,399	4,550	3,386	85	61	2,918	65	66	27	2,538	15	2,266	906	841	1,139	440	37,508
Mojokerto City 2	3,266	1,557	3,106	4,294	2,870	39	164	1,999	9	89	29	1,736	12	3,220	639	75	364	300	23,768
Mojokerto City 3	3,937	2,057	1,550	1,508	4,372	51	66	2,387	21	14	34	1,463	16	4,455	235	101	4,182	91	26,540
Total	12,645	5,978	15,055	10,352	10,628	175	291	7,304	95	169	90	5,737	43	9,941	1,780	1,017	5,685	831	87,816
Source: General Elections Commission of Indonesia

== Composition ==
The following is the composition of members of the Mojokerto City Regional House of Representatives in the last four periods.

Party	Total seats			
Party	2009–2014	2014–2019	2019–2024	2024–2029
PKB seats	3	3	▲4	4
Gerindra seats	0	▲3	▼2	2
PDI-P seats	4	▲6	▼5	5
Golkar seats	3	3	▲4	▼2
NasDem seats		0	▲1	▲3
PKS seats	1	▲2	2	▲3
Hanura seats	1	▼0	0	0
PAN seats	5	▼4	▼3	▼2
Demokrat seats	4	▼2	▲3	3
PPP seats	1	▲2	▼1	1
PKPI seats	1	▼0	0	
PKNU seats	1			
PPRN seats	1			
Total Seats	25	25	25	25
Total Party	11	▼8	▲9	9

== Electoral District ==
In the 2019 Legislative Election and the 2024 Legislative Election, the Mojokerto City Regional House of Representatives election was divided into 3 electoral districts as follows:

Electoral District Name	Electoral District Area	Number of Seats
MOJOKERTO CITY 1	Magersari	11
MOJOKERTO CITY 2	Kranggan	7
MOJOKERTO CITY 3	Prajuritkulon	7
TOTAL		25

== See also ==
- East Java Regional House of Representatives
- Mojokerto
- East Java
