= Probolinggo City Regional House of Representatives =

Probolinggo City Regional House of Representatives Dewan Perwakilan Rakyat Daerah Kota Probolinggo
- 2024–2029 period

Type
- Type: Unicameral
- Term limits: 5 years

History
- New session started: 24 August 2024

Leadership
- Speaker: Hj. Dwi Laksmi Syntha Kusumawardhani, S.E., Golkar since 17 October 2024
- 1st Vice Speaker: Abdul Mujib, S.Pd.I., PKB since 17 October 2024
- 2nd Vice Speaker: Santi Wilujeng Prastyani, PDI-P since 17 October 2024

Structure
- Seats: 30
- Political groups: PDI-P (5) NasDem (3) PKB (6) Golkar (7) PPP (2) Gerindra (4) PKS (3)

Elections
- Voting system: Open list
- Last election: 14 February 2024

Meeting place
- Probolinggo City Regional House of Representatives Building; Suroyo Street Number 27; Tisnonegaran, Kanigaran, Probolinggo; East Java, Indonesia

Website
- dprdkotaprobolinggo.id

The Probolinggo City Regional House of Representatives (Indonesian: Dewan Perwakilan Rakyat Daerah Kota Probolinggo, DPRD Kota Probolinggo) is the unicameral municipal legislature of Probolinggo, East Java, Indonesia. It has 30 members, who are elected every five years, simultaneously with the national legislative election.

== Legal basis ==
The legislature for Probolinggo was formed along with those of other cities in East Java under Law Number 17 of 1950, which organized city governments within the province.

== General election results ==
=== 2024 Indonesian legislative election ===
The official valid votes received by political parties contesting the 2024 Indonesian legislative election in each electoral district (constituency) for members of the Probolinggo City Regional House of Representatives are as follows.

2024 Indonesian legislative election results

Electoral district	PKB	Gerindra	PDI-P	Golkar	NasDem	Labour	Gelora	PKS	PKN	Hanura	Garuda	PAN	PBB	Democratic	PSI	Perindo	PPP	Ummat	Valid votes
Probolinggo City 1	8,892	3,023	2,802	9,028	6,842	72	33	2,687	5	21	0	1,110	9	798	232	35	1,434	116	37,139
Probolinggo City 2	5,495	4,285	5,415	7,919	4,766	58	66	3,173	4	17	0	315	24	669	526	31	3,474	74	36,311
Probolinggo City 3	4,741	3,039	4,739	4,417	1,933	14	19	966	2	7	0	141	2	111	40	6	2,200	21	22,398
Probolinggo City 4	4,883	799	1,766	5,060	4,860	32	139	4,253	16	29	0	637	5	167	138	162	230	35	23,211
Probolinggo City 5	5,293	4,788	6,447	4,504	1,583	22	22	727	5	6	0	130	4	121	53	13	3,943	71	27,732
Total	29,304	15,934	21,169	30,928	19,984	198	279	11,806	32	80	0	2,333	44	1,866	989	247	11,281	317	146,791
Source: General Elections Commission of Indonesia

== Composition ==
The following is the composition of members of the Probolinggo City Regional House of Representatives in the last four periods.

Party	Total seats			
Party	2009–2014	2014–2019	2019–2024	2024–2029
PKB seats	5	▼4	▲6	6
Gerindra seats	1	▲3	3	▲4
PDI-P seats	8	8	▼6	▼5
Golkar seats	3	▲5	5	▲7
NasDem seats		4	▼3	3
PKS seats	1	1	▲2	▲3
PAN seats	2	▼0	0	0
Demokrat seats	3	▼2	2	▼0
PPP seats	2	▲3	3	▼2
PKPI seats	1	▼0	0	
Pelopor seats	1			
PKNU seats	3			
Total Seats	30	30	30	30
Total Party	11	▼8	8	▼7

== Electoral District ==
In the 2019 Legislative Election, the Probolinggo City Regional House of Representatives election was divided into 3 electoral districts as follows:

Electoral District Name	Electoral District Area	Number of Seats
PROBOLINGGO CITY 1	Kanigaran, Wonoasih	12
PROBOLINGGO CITY 2	Kademangan, Kedopok	10
PROBOLINGGO CITY 3	Mayangan	8
TOTAL		30

In the 2024 Legislative Election, the Probolinggo City Regional House of Representatives election was divided into 5 electoral districts as follows:

Electoral District Name	Electoral District Area	Number of Seats
PROBOLINGGO CITY 1	Kanigaran	8
PROBOLINGGO CITY 2	Mayangan	8
PROBOLINGGO CITY 3	Wonoasih	4
PROBOLINGGO CITY 4	Kedopok	5
PROBOLINGGO CITY 5	Kademangan	5
TOTAL		30

== See also ==
- East Java Regional House of Representatives
- Probolinggo
- East Java
