= Heli Suyanto =

Indonesian politician (born 1980)

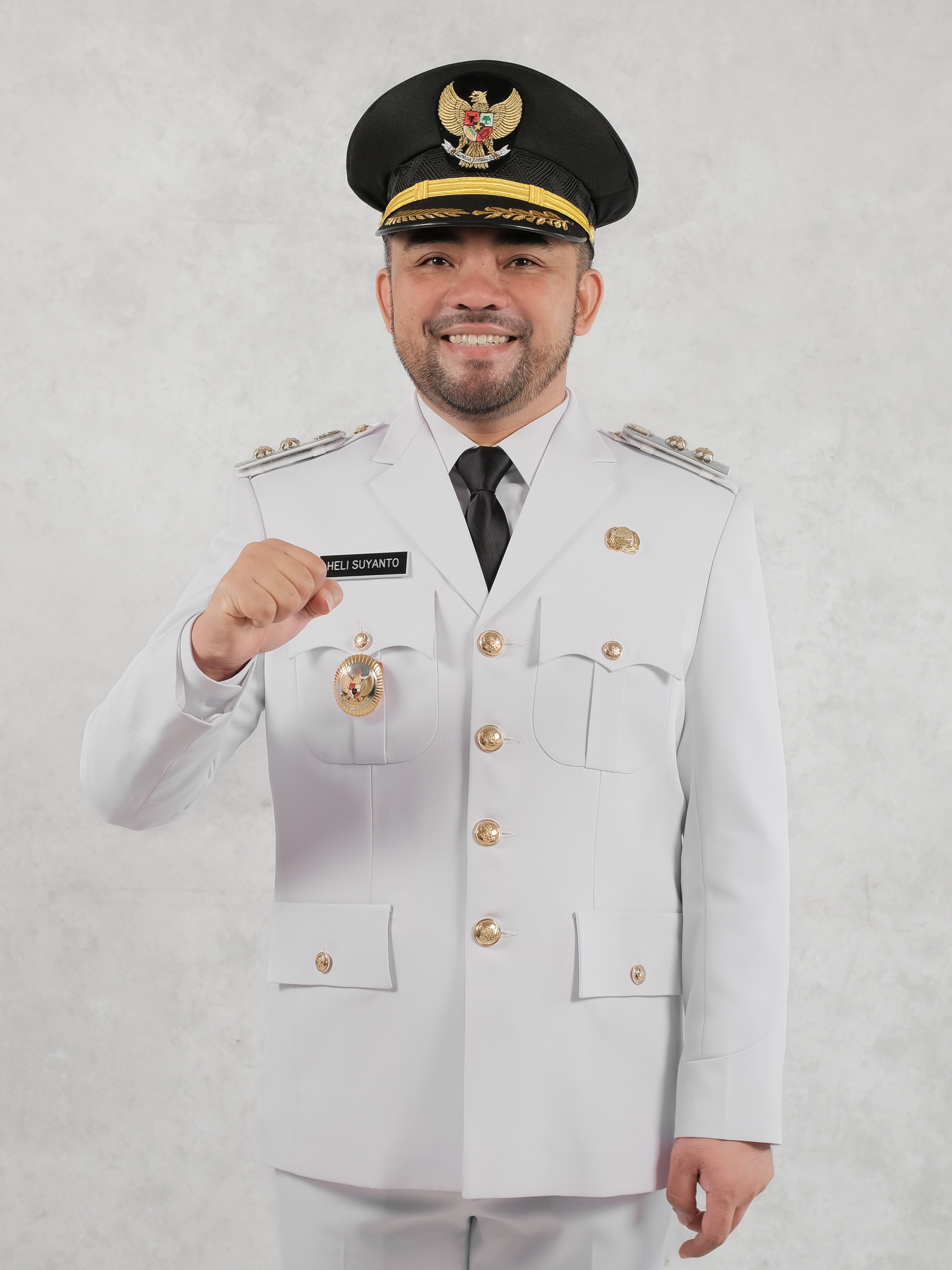

4th Vice mayor of Batu
- Incumbent
- Assumed office 20 February 2025
- President: Prabowo Subianto
- Governor: Khofifah Indar Parawansa
- Mayor: Nurochman
- Preceded by: Punjul Santoso

Personal details
- Born: June 29, 1980 (age 46) Malang, East Java
- Party: Great Indonesia Movement Party
- Spouse: Ridha Agusta Susandra
- Education: Islamic University of Malang (S.H., M.H.)
- Profession: Politician

Heli Suyanto (born 29 June 1980) is a politician from the Great Indonesia Movement Party who served as Deputy mayor of Batu for the 2025–2030 term. He served since 20 February 2025 after being inaugurated by President Prabowo Subianto at the Istana Negara, Jakarta.

== Education ==
Heli spent his childhood and completed his elementary education at Tulungrejo 03 Elementary School (1987–1993). He then continued his studies at Widyatama Batu Junior High School (1993–1996) and moved to Malang City to attend Shalahuddin Senior High School (1996–1999). In 2009, he studied at the Faculty of Law Islamic University of Malang and earned a Bachelor of Laws degree in 2013.

In 2020, Heli continued his Master of Law studies at the same university and obtained his Master of Laws degree in 2022.

== Career ==
=== Becoming Deputy Mayor of Batu ===
On 28 August 2024, Heli officially registered to participate in the 2024 Batu mayoral election. He accompanied Nurochman, a PKB politician, and was nominated by PKB and Gerindra, and supported by PSI.

The Cak Nur–Mas Heli pair successfully won the 2024 Batu mayoral election with the support of 65.684 votes or 50,32 percent of the total valid votes, surpassing two other candidates, namely Firhando Gumelar–Rudi and Kris Dayanti–Kresna Dewanata Phrosakh. They were officially declared the winners by the Batu City Regional General Election Commission on 9 January 2025, in an event held at The Singhasari Resort.

Political offices
Preceded by Punjul Santoso	Vice mayor of Batu; 2025–now	Succeeded by Incumbent
