= Batu, Indonesia =

City in East Java, Indonesia

Batu
- City
- City of Batu; Kota Batu

Other transcription(s)
  - Javanese: Kuthå Batu (Gêdrig) كوڟا باتو (Pégon) ꦏꦸꦛꦧꦠꦸ (Hånåcåråkå)
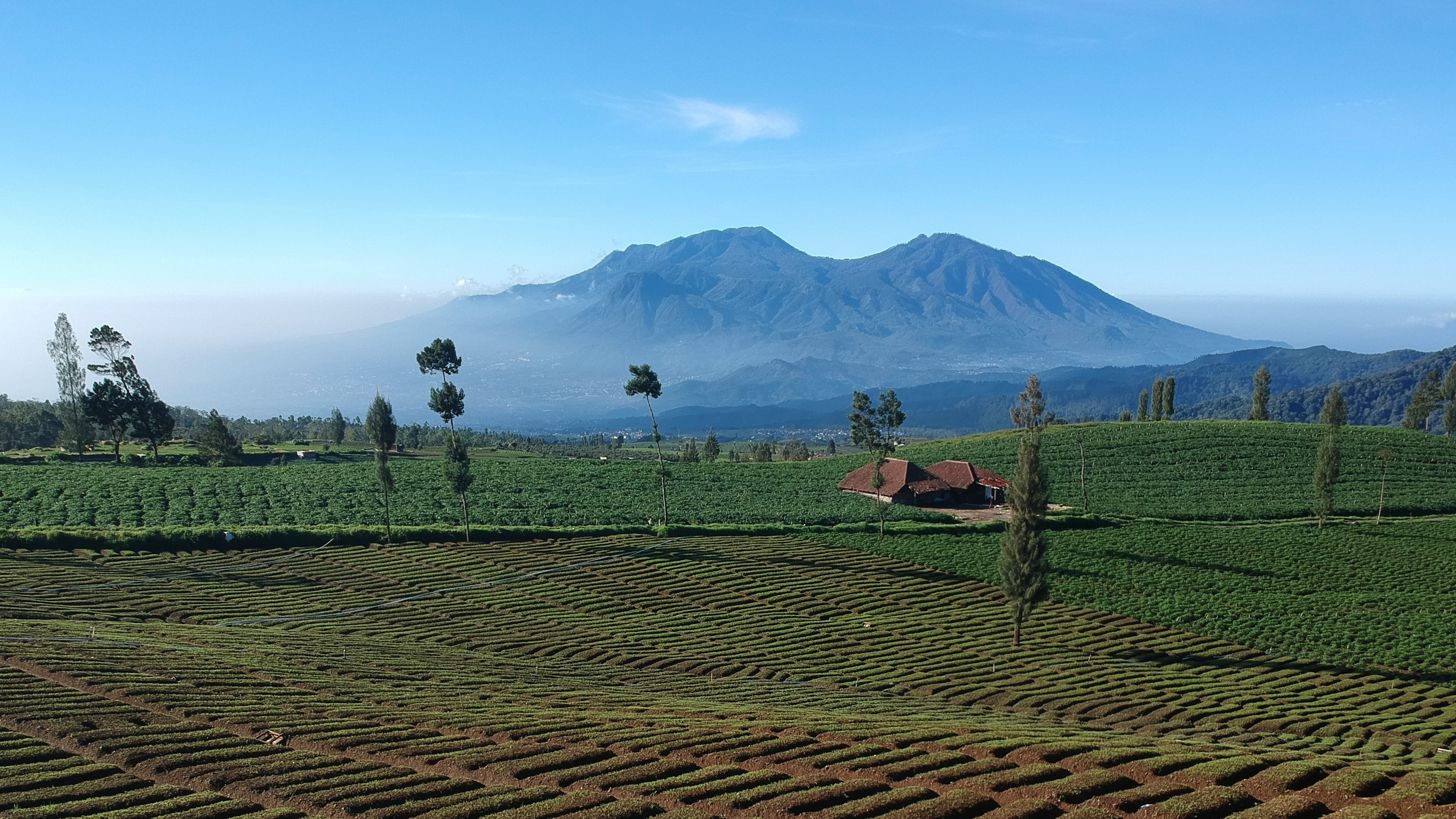
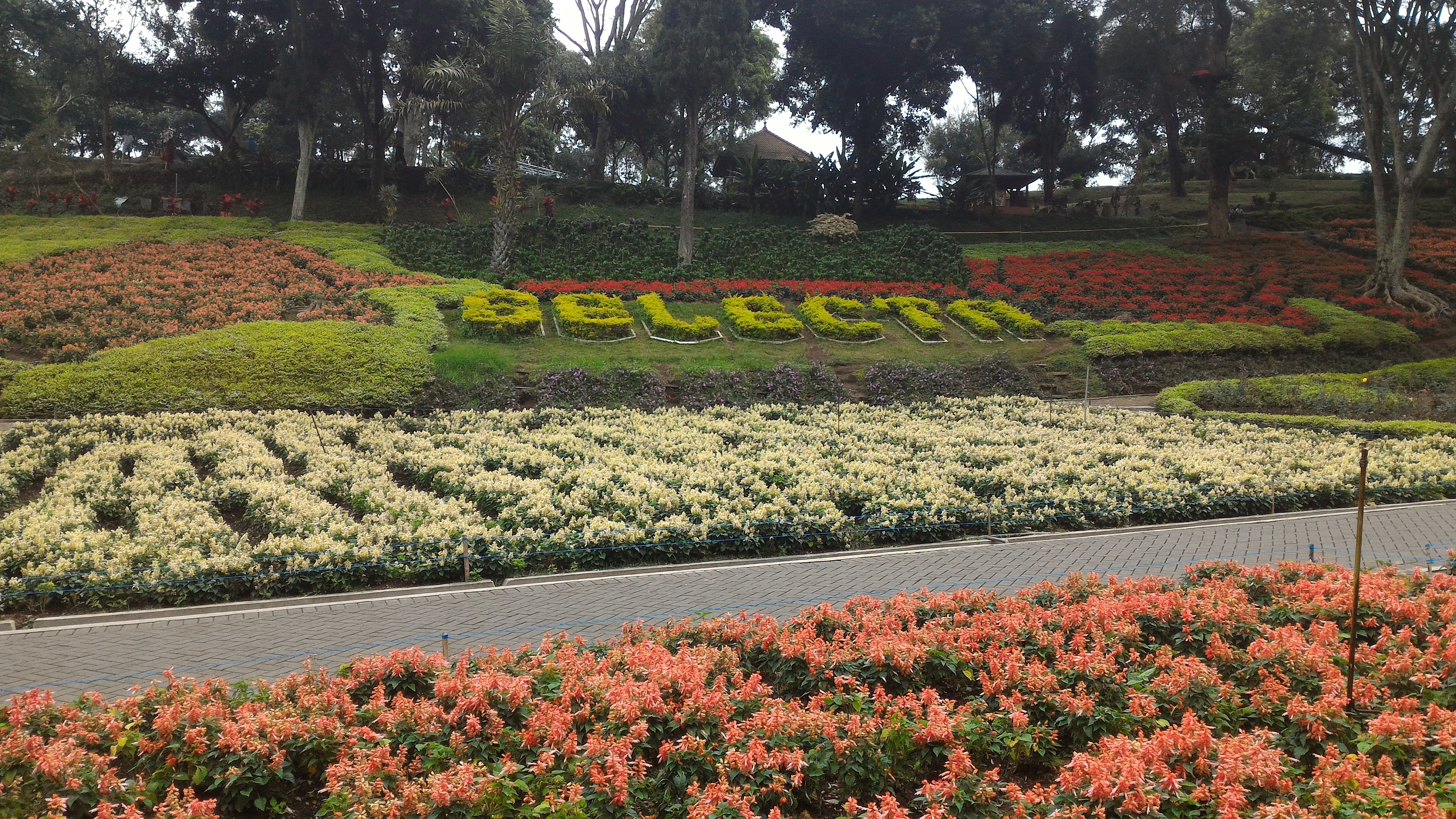
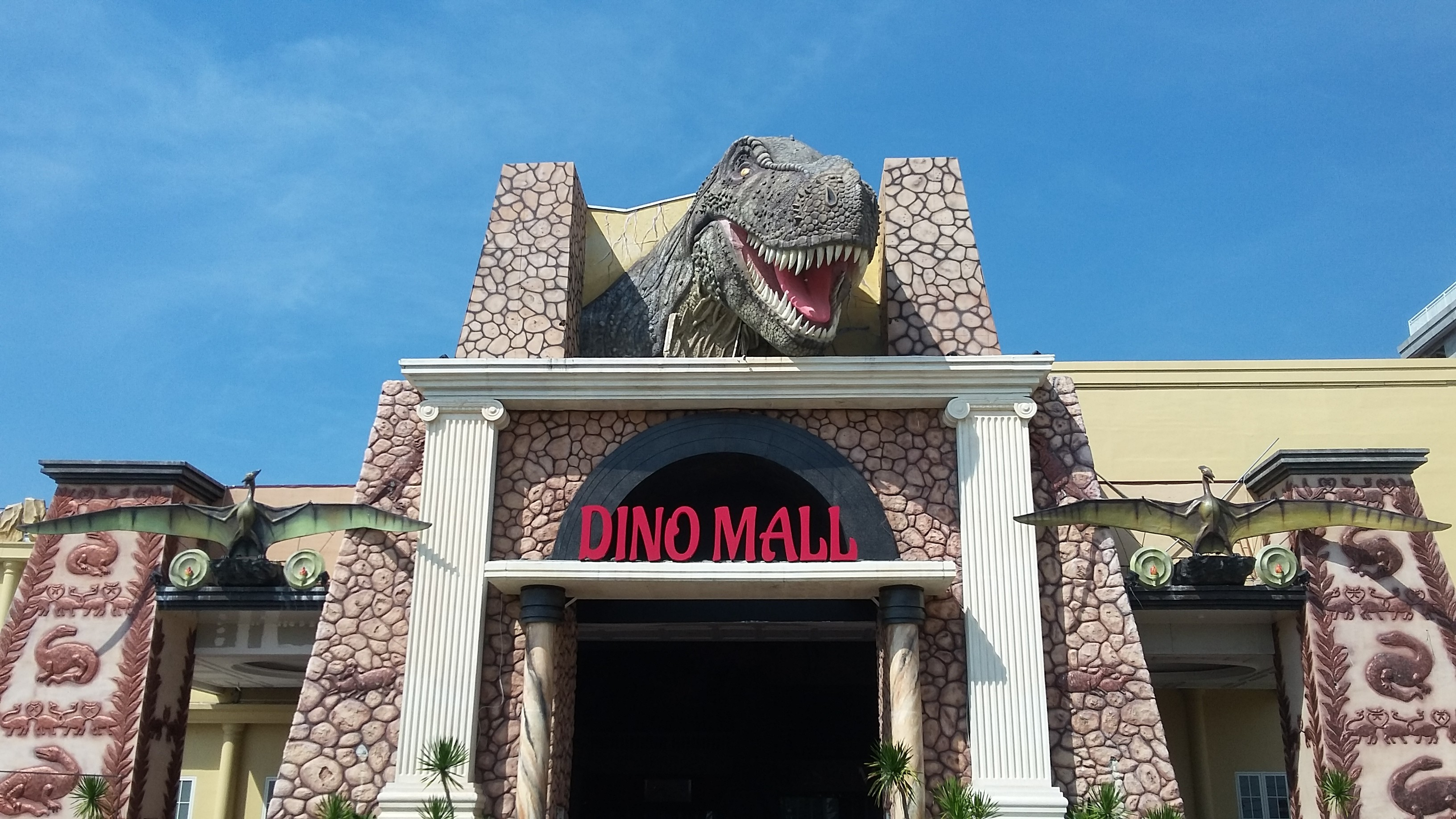
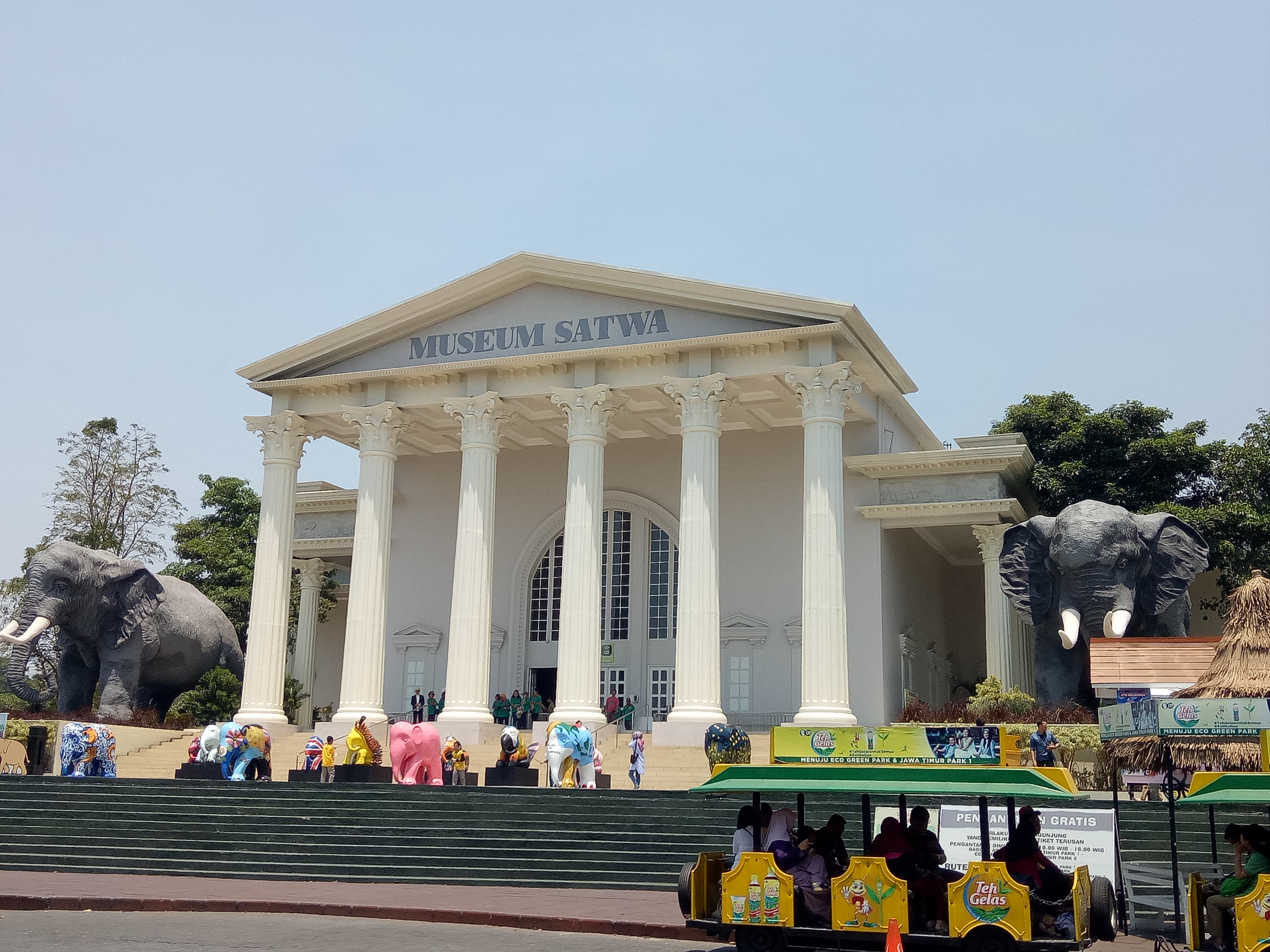
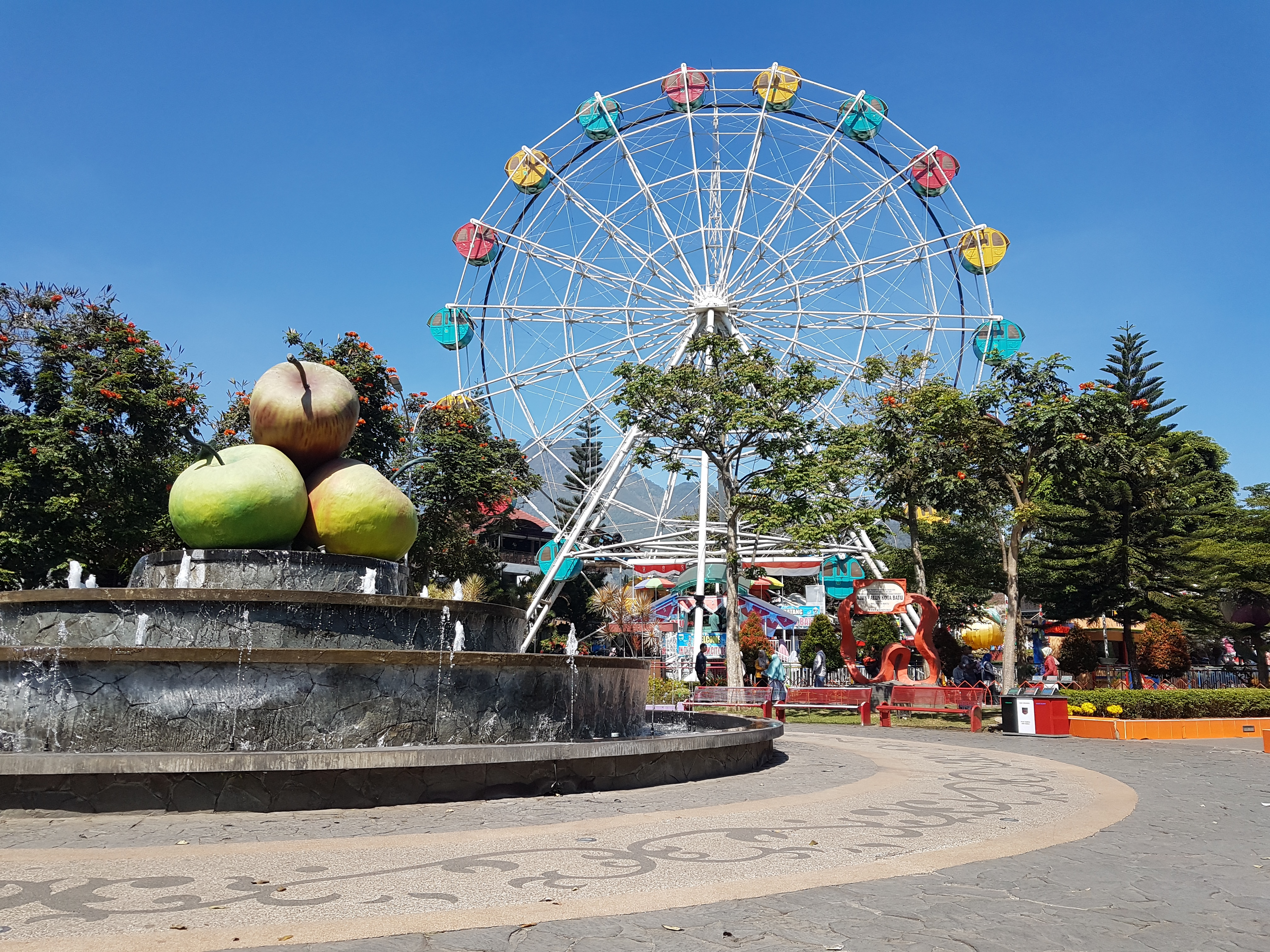
- Brakseng-Plantation on hillside of Arjuno and background's far view of Mount Kawi and Butak Selecta Recreational Park Dino Park Mall of Jawa Timur Park 3 Animal Museum of Jawa Timur Park 2 Alun-alun Batu

- Coat of arms
- Nicknames: Zwitserland van Java (Dutch) (Switzerland of Java)
- Motto: Hakaryo Guno Mamayu Bawono (Javanese) ꦲꦏꦂꦪꦒꦸꦤꦩꦩꦪꦸꦧꦮꦤ (Work to Advancing the World)
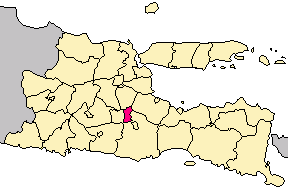
- Location within East Java

- Location in Java and Indonesia Batu (Indonesia)
- Coordinates: 7°52′19″S 112°31′30″E
- Country: Indonesia
- Province: East Java
- Established: 21 June 2001 (age 25)

Government
  - Mayor: Nurochman
  - Vice Mayor: Heli Suyanto

Area
  - Total: 194.17 km^{2} (74.97 sq mi)
- Elevation: 892 m (2,927 ft)
- Highest elevation: 1,800 m (5,900 ft)
- Lowest elevation: 700 m (2,300 ft)

Population (mid 2025 estimate)
  - Total: 225,408
  - Density: 1,160.9/km^{2} (3,006.7/sq mi)
- Time zone: UTC+7 (Indonesia Western Time)
- Area code: (+62) 341
- Website: batukota.go.id

Batu, officially the City of Batu (Indonesian: Kota Batu, Javanese: ꦏꦸꦛꦧꦠꦸ, romanized: Kutha Batu), is a city in the East Java Province of Indonesia. It is about 20 km to the northwest of Malang. Formerly, it was a part of Malang Regency; but in June 2001, Batu became an independent city (by Act No. 11 of 2001), with its own mayor and council.

With a population of 213,046 people at the 2020 Census, which rose to 225,408 as officially estimated as of mid 2025 (comprising 113,186 males and 112,222 females), Batu lies on the southern slopes of Mount Arjuno-Welirang. Its population largely consists of Javanese. The town used to be a recreation place for the Dutch colonial officers in the Dutch colonial area (before 1945). Batu means "rock" in Indonesian.

== History ==
Since the 10th century, the area of Batu and its surroundings has been known as a resting place for the royal family, because the region is a mountainous area with comfortable air, also supported by the beauty of natural scenery as a characteristic of mountainous regions.

During the reign of the Mataram Kingdom under King Sindok, a royal official named Mpu Supo was ordered by the King to build a royal family resting place in the mountains with nearby water springs. With a hard effort, finally Mpu Supo discovered an area that is now better known as the tourist area of Songgoriti. With the approval of King Sindok, Mpu Supo began to build the Songgoriti area as a royal family retreat and built a temple named Supo Temple.

Some local community leaders said that the title Batu comes from the name of a cleric follower of Prince Diponegoro named Abu Ghonaim referred to as the Kyai Gubug Angin which later the local community was familiar with calling Mbah Wastu. From Javanese cultural habits that often shorten and shorten the designation of someone's name which is considered too long, also to make it shorter and faster when calling someone, finally Mbah Wastu is called Mbah Tu to be Mbatu or Batu as a term used for a mild climate city in East Java.

The history of Abu Ghonaim's existence as a forerunner and person known as a community leader who started the "babad alas" which was used as an inspiration from the designation of the Batu region. Abu Ghonaim was from the Central Java region. Abu Ghonaim as a loyal follower of Prince Diponegoro, intentionally left his native area of Central Java and moved to the hillside of Mount Panderman to avoid the pursuit and arrest of the Dutch soldiers (Kompeni). Abu Ghonaim or Mbah Wastu started his new life together with the surrounding community. Finally, many residents and surrounding communities and other communities came around the residence of Mbah Wastu. Initially, they lived in a group (community) in the Bumiaji, Sisir and Temas.

== Geography ==
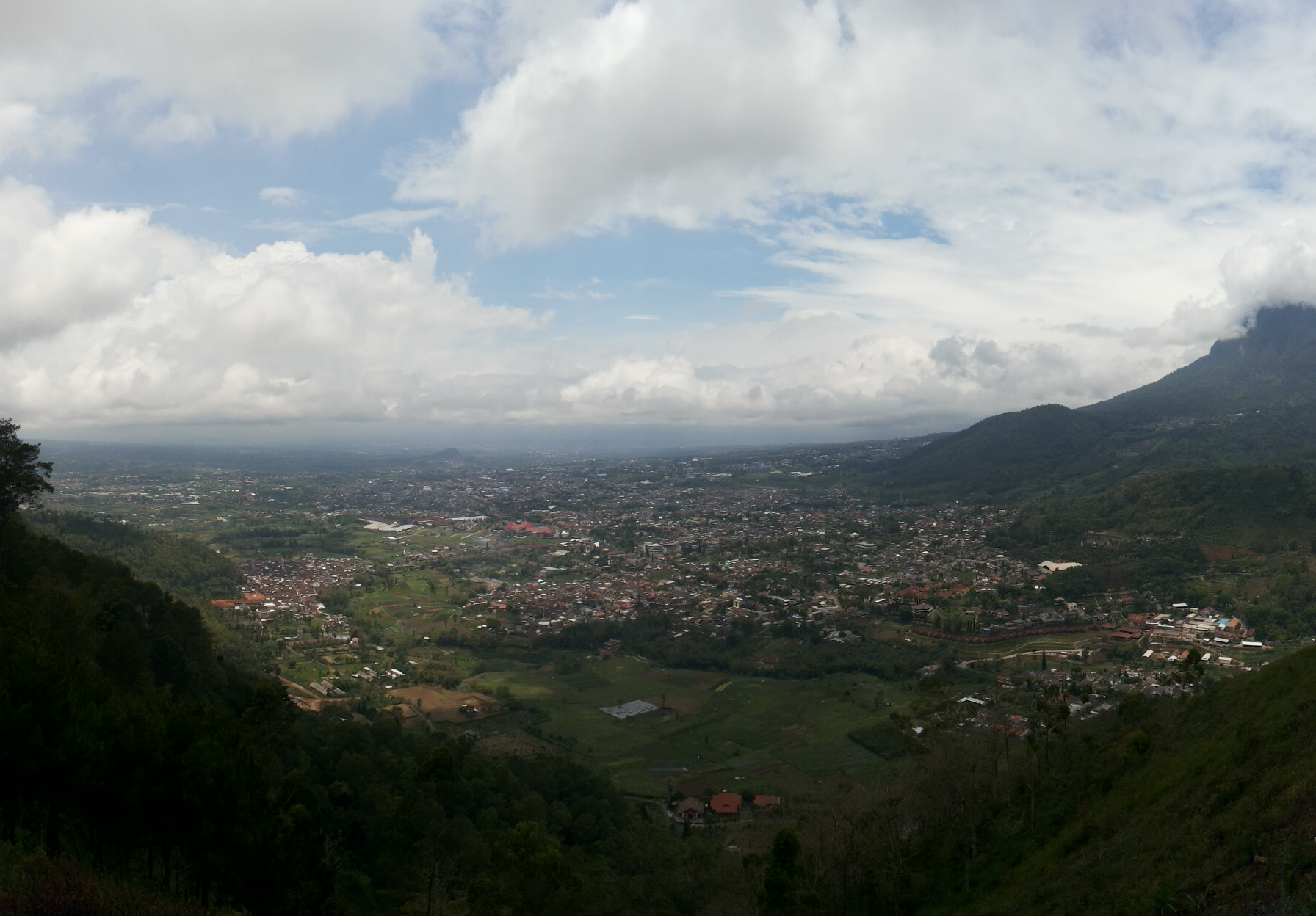
View of Batu from Mount Banyak

Prominent mountains around Batu are Mount Anjasmoro (2,277 m), Mount Arjuno (3,339 m), Mount Welirang (3,156 m), Mount Banyak (1,306 m), Mount Kawi (2,551 m), Mount Panderman (2,045 m), Mount Semeru (3.676 m), and Mount Wukir (335 m).

Most of the topography of Batu City is dominated by highland and hilly terrain with valleys running down mountain slopes. In northern Batu, there is a dense forest, Raden Soerjo Forest Park, which is a protected forest area.

Most soils in Batu city are andosols, sequentially present with cambisol, latosol and alluvial. These form mechanical soils which contain substantial amounts of minerals coming from volcanic eruptions. These soils tend to be very fertile.

=== Climate ===
Batu city at lower elevation (700 to 900 metres or 2,300 to 3,000 feet) features a tropical monsoon climate (Köppen Am), while higher elevations (900 to 1,800 metres or 3,000 to 5,900 feet), are classified as a subtropical highland climate (Cwb). The driest month is August with a total precipitation of 35 mm (1.4 inches), while the wettest month is January with a total precipitation of 406 mm (16 inches). The temperature is moderated by the altitude, as the city is located at an average of 953 metres (3,127 ft) above sea level. The hottest month is October with an average maximum of 22.2 °C (72.0 °F), while the coolest month is July with an average minimum of 4.5 °C (40.1 °F).

Climate data for Tulungrejo, Bumiaji, Batu (elevation 1,610 m or 5,280 ft)
Month	Jan	Feb	Mar	Apr	May	Jun	Jul	Aug	Sep	Oct	Nov	Dec	Year
Mean daily maximum °C (°F)	21.4 (70.5)	21.6 (70.9)	21.6 (70.9)	21.5 (70.7)	21.5 (70.7)	21.2 (70.2)	20.7 (69.3)	21 (70)	21.8 (71.2)	22.2 (72.0)	21.8 (71.2)	21.5 (70.7)	21.5 (70.7)
Daily mean °C (°F)	17.6 (63.7)	17.7 (63.9)	17.8 (64.0)	17.8 (64.0)	17.3 (63.1)	16.9 (62.4)	16.1 (61.0)	16.2 (61.2)	16.9 (62.4)	17.6 (63.7)	17.9 (64.2)	17.6 (63.7)	17.3 (63.1)
Mean daily minimum °C (°F)	13.9 (57.0)	13.9 (57.0)	14.1 (57.4)	13.6 (56.5)	9.2 (48.6)	9.6 (49.3)	4.5 (40.1)	6.4 (43.5)	11 (52)	9.1 (48.4)	14 (57)	13.8 (56.8)	11.1 (52.0)
Average precipitation mm (inches)	406 (16.0)	353 (13.9)	395 (15.6)	242 (9.5)	176 (6.9)	81 (3.2)	52 (2.0)	35 (1.4)	46 (1.8)	130 (5.1)	282 (11.1)	385 (15.2)	2,583 (101.7)
Average relative humidity (%)	81.7	82.3	82.2	79.2	79.8	77.3	75.1	72.9	70.9	70.9	74.4	79.1	77.1
Source 1: Climate-Data.org (temp & precip)
Source 2: Weatherbase (humidity)

== Administration ==
The city is divided into three districts (kecamatan), tabulated below with their areas and their populations at the 2010 Census and 2020 Census, together with the official estimates as at mid 2025. The table also includes the locations of the district administrative centres, the numbers of administrative villages (urban kelurahan and rural desa) in each district, and its postal codes.

Kode Wilayah	Name of District (kecamatan)	Area in km^{2}	Pop'n Census 2010	Pop'n Census 2020	Pop'n Estimate mid 2025	Admin centre	No. of villages	Post codes
35.79.01	Batu (district)	43.43	88,178	96,921	102,698	Sisir	8	65311 - 65318
35,79.03	Junrejo	30.68	46,382	55,105	57,991	Junrejo	7	65321 - 65327
35.79.02	Bumiaji	120.06	55,624	61,020	64,719	Punten	9	65331 - 65338
	Totals	194.17	190,184	213,046	225,408	Pesanggrahan	24	

The districts are further subdivided into 5 urban villages (kelurahan) and 19 rural villages (desa). Four villages in Batu District (Ngaglik, Sisir, Songgokerto and Temas) and one village in Junrejo District (Dadaprejo) are classed as kelurahan; all the others are classed as desa. The names of the villages (with their post codes) are:

Batu District

1. Ngaglik (65311)
2. Oro-Oro Ombo (Rombo) (65316)
3. Pesanggrahan (65313)
4. Sidomulyo (65317)
5. Sisir (65314)
6. Songgokerto (65312)
7. Sumberejo (65318)
8. Temas (65315)

Bumiaji district

1. Bulukerto (65334)
2. Bumiaji (65331)
3. Giripurno (65333)
4. Gunungsari (65337)
5. Pandanrejo (65332)
6. Punten (65338)
7. Sumberbrantas (65338)
8. Sumbergondo (65335)
9. Tulungrejo (65336)

Junrejo district

1. Beji (65326)
2. Dadaprejo (65323)
3. Junrejo (65321)
4. Mojorejo (65322)
5. Pendem (65324)
6. Tlekung (65327)
7. Torongrejo (65325)

== Government ==
=== Mayor ===
The Mayor of Batu is the highest-ranking official within the Batu City government. He reports to the Governor of East Java. The current mayor or regional head of Batu City is Nurochman, with Heli Suyanto as vice mayor. They took office on 20 February 2025.

== Economy ==
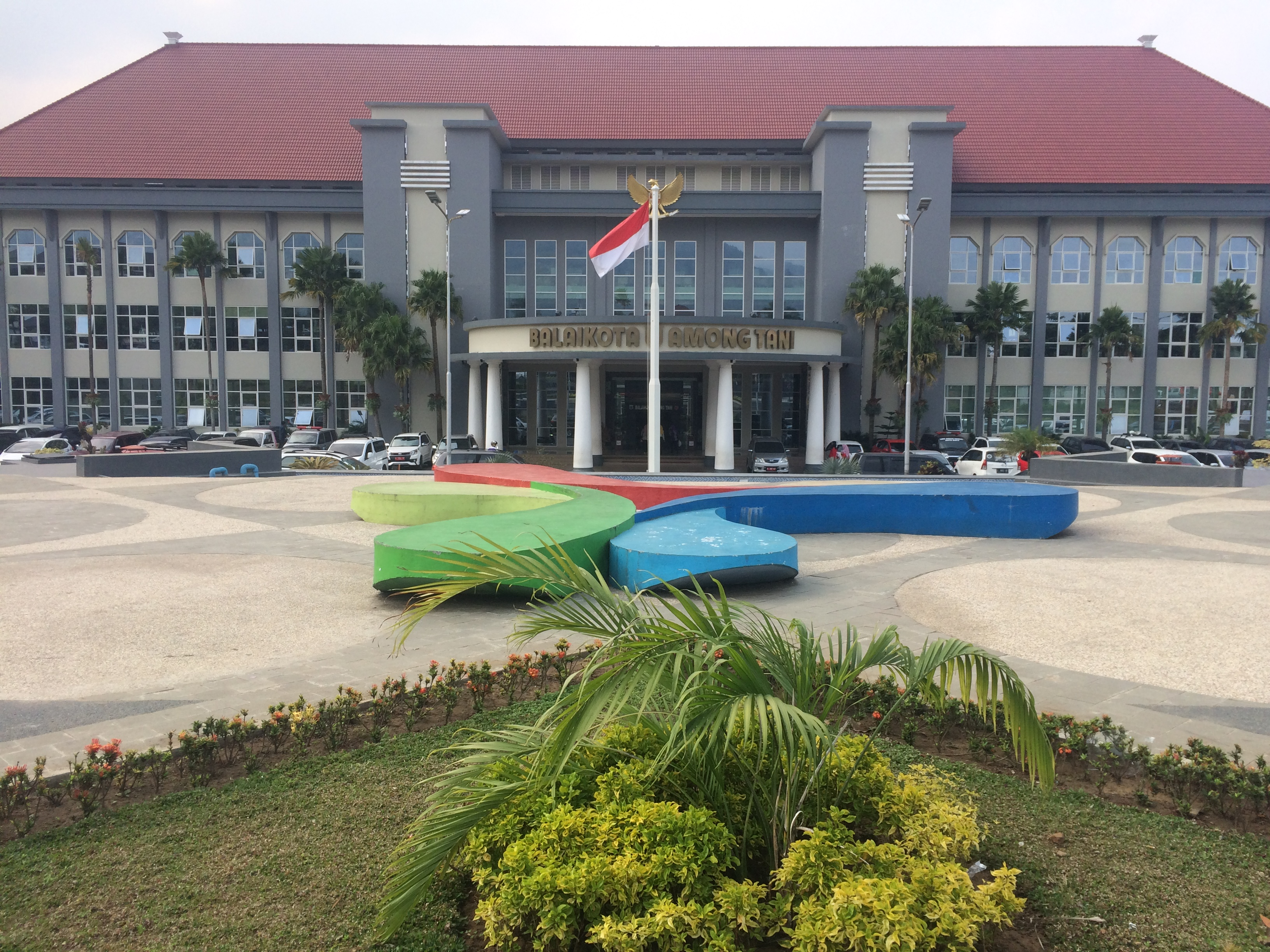
Batu city hall

The economy of Batu City is highly dependent on tourism and agriculture. The location of Batu City in the mountainous region has inspired rapid tourism development which sector has created most of the GDP growth in Batu. In agriculture, Batu is one of the largest apple-producing regions in Indonesia, which makes it dubbed "The City of Apples". Apple agriculture in Batu has four varieties, there are "Manalagi", "Rome Beauty", "Anna", and "Wangling". The city also produces a lot of vegetables, and garlic. Besides that, Batu is also an artist city where there are many painting and art galleries.

Batu has several shopping centers ranging from modern shopping centers to traditional markets. Among the most famous modern shopping centers are Lippo Plaza Batu and Plaza Batu, while the famous traditional market in Batu is Pasar Batu. In addition, there is also a floating market in Batu called the Nusantara Floating Market which is the first floating market in East Java. The Nusantara Floating Market Complex is a unit of the Museum Angkut tourism complex in Batu.

== Tourism ==
Batu is well known for its tourism sites. notable examples include:

- Coban Rondo Waterfall and Labyrinth
- Jatim Park 1(Jawa Timur Park): a place for learning and playing.
- Jatim Park 2 and Batu Secret Zoo
- Jatim Park 3 and Dino Mall
- Selecta
- BNS: Batu Night Spectacular
- Alun-Alun Batu
- Eco-Green Park
- Museum Angkut
- Pasar Parkiran
- Wisata Edukasi Susu Batu (WESB : Milk Education)
- Paralayang Gunung Banyak
- Coban Pitu Waterfall
- Coban Talun Waterfall
- Coban Putri Waterfall
- Coban Kali Lanang Waterfall
- Coban Rais Waterfall
- Cangar Hot Spring
- Songgoriti Hot Spring and Recreational Park
- Songgoriti Temple
- Mount Panderman and Butak Hiking
- Mount Arjuna Hiking via Sumber Brantas
- Brau Milk Education Village
- Arboretum Sumber Brantas
- Jengkoang Hill
- Gunung Pucung Adventure
- Among Tani Market Center
- Kaliwatu Rafting and Outbond
- Batu Flower Garden
- Batu Love Garden (Baloga)
- Predator Park
- Pendem Temple
- Punden Kajang Megalith Site
- Brakseng
- Puncak Pandawa
- Sidomulyo Flower Mall
- Kampung Sakura
- Kusuma Agrowisata
- Apple and Strawberry Agrotourism
- Umbul Gemulo (Natural Spring)
- Taman Dolan
- Batu Jati Mas (BJM) Pool
- Payung Culinary
- Historical Mbah mBatu Cemetery
- Bukit Teletubies Bumiaji
- Kampung Wisata Kungkuk
- Lemah Abang Water Park
- Gunungsari Rose Agrotourism
- Pandawa Cave and Camping Ground
- Coban Talun Offroad
- Pura Luhur Giri Arjuna
- Taman Pinus Campervan Park
- Jalibar Pacuan Kuda (Horse Race)
- Batu Eduplay
- Sawah Genting
- Galeri Raos (Art Gallery)

There is a historic colonial-style hotel, the Kartika Wijaya. It was founded in 1891 by the Sarkies Brothers, prominent Armenian immigrants best known for founding a chain of luxury hotels throughout Southeast Asia. Originally built as a vacation villa for the Sarkies family, it was later turned into a hotel.

Batu ranks second after Bali in terms of the number of tourists visiting, in 2023 Batu City will receive 10 million tourists and in 2024 it is estimated that there will be 12 million tourist visits estimated by Government.

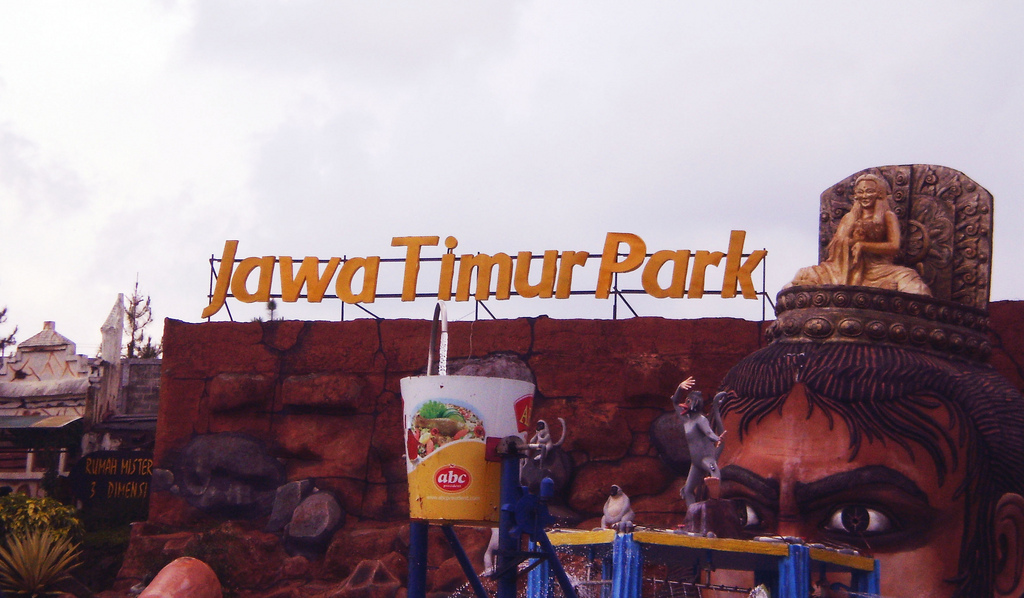
Jawa Timur Park

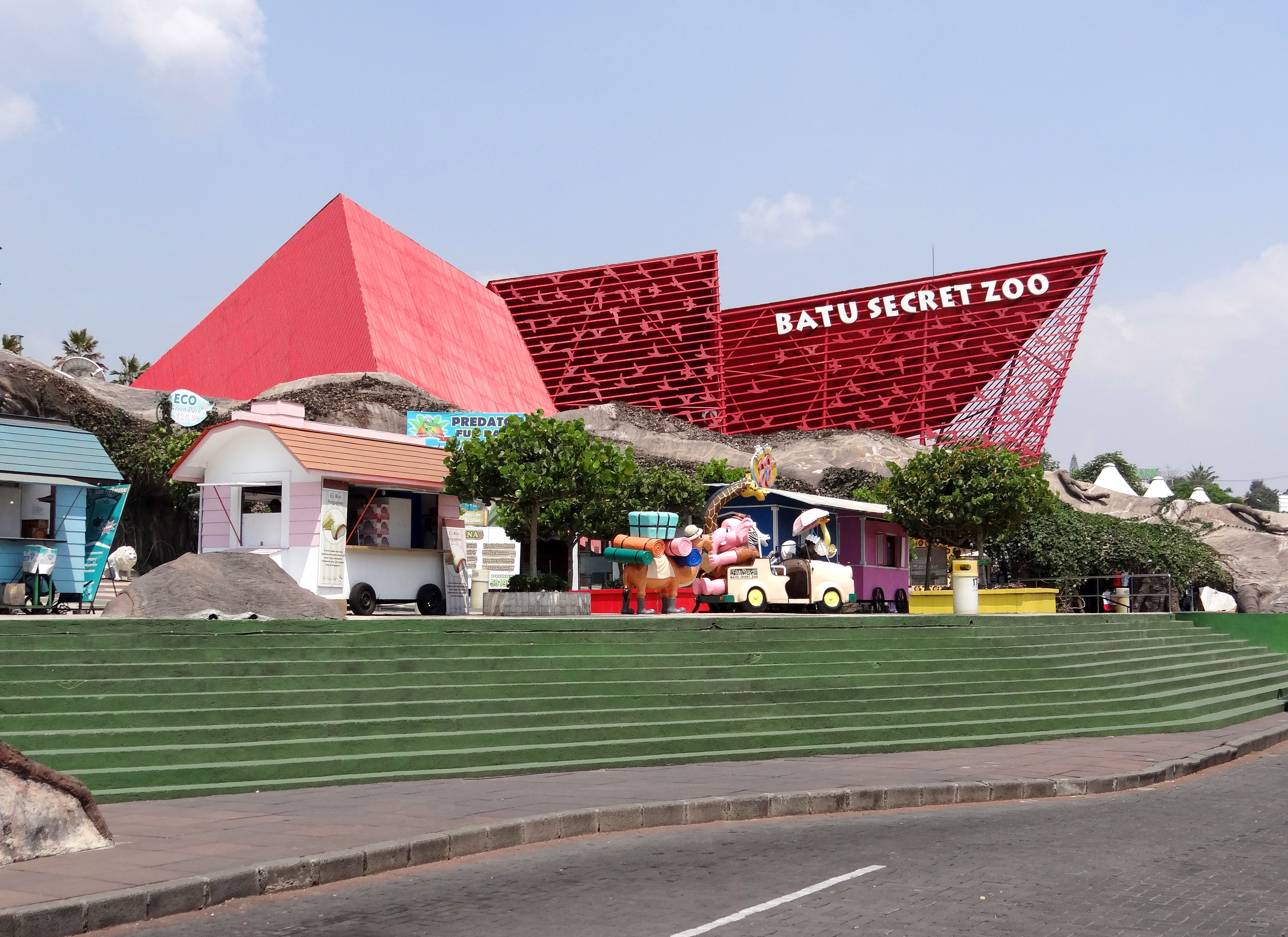
Batu Secret Zoo

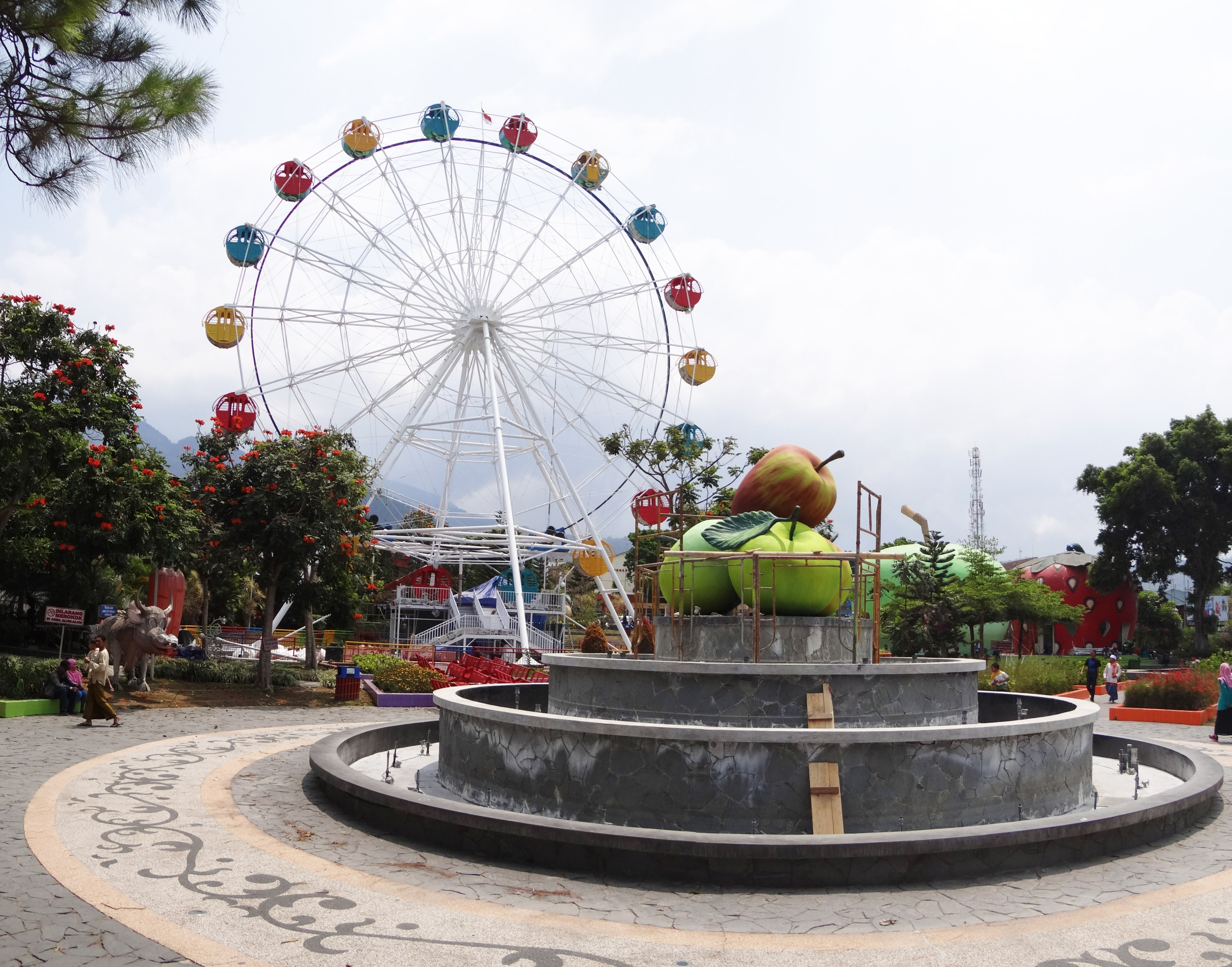
Alun-alun Batu

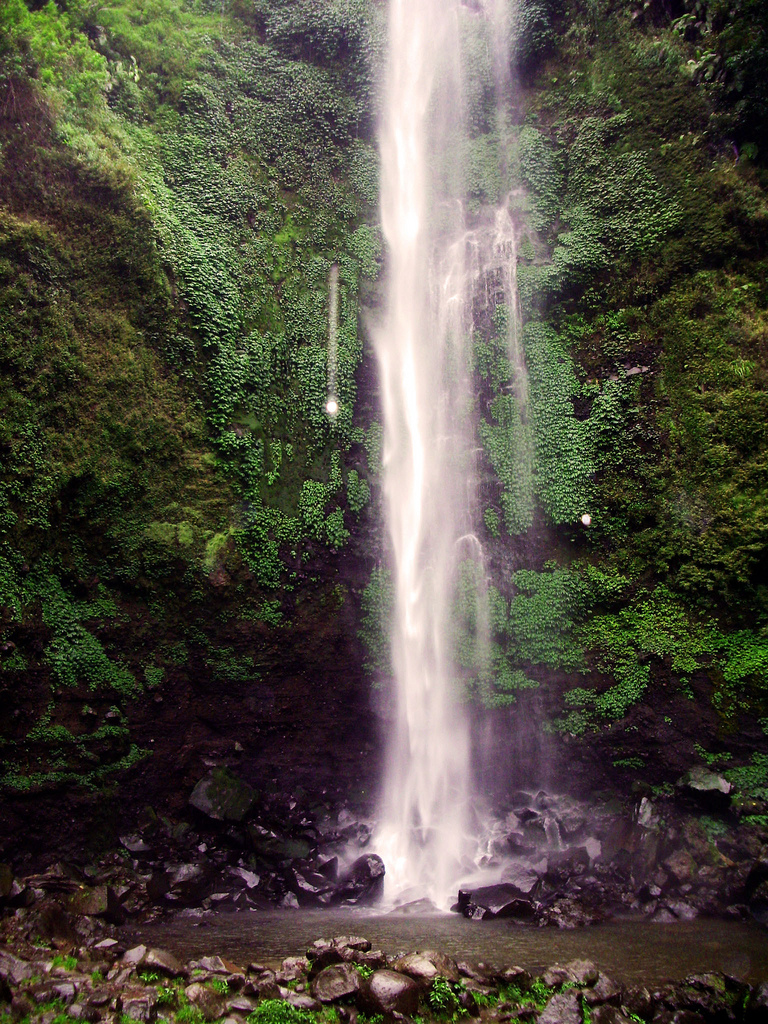
Rondo Waterfall (Coban Rondo)

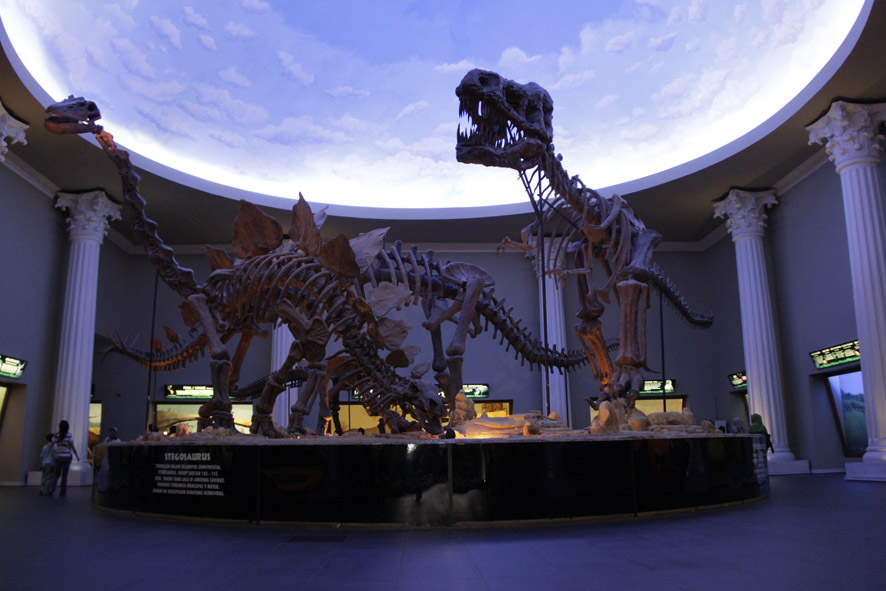
Batu Zoological Museum (Museum Satwa Batu)

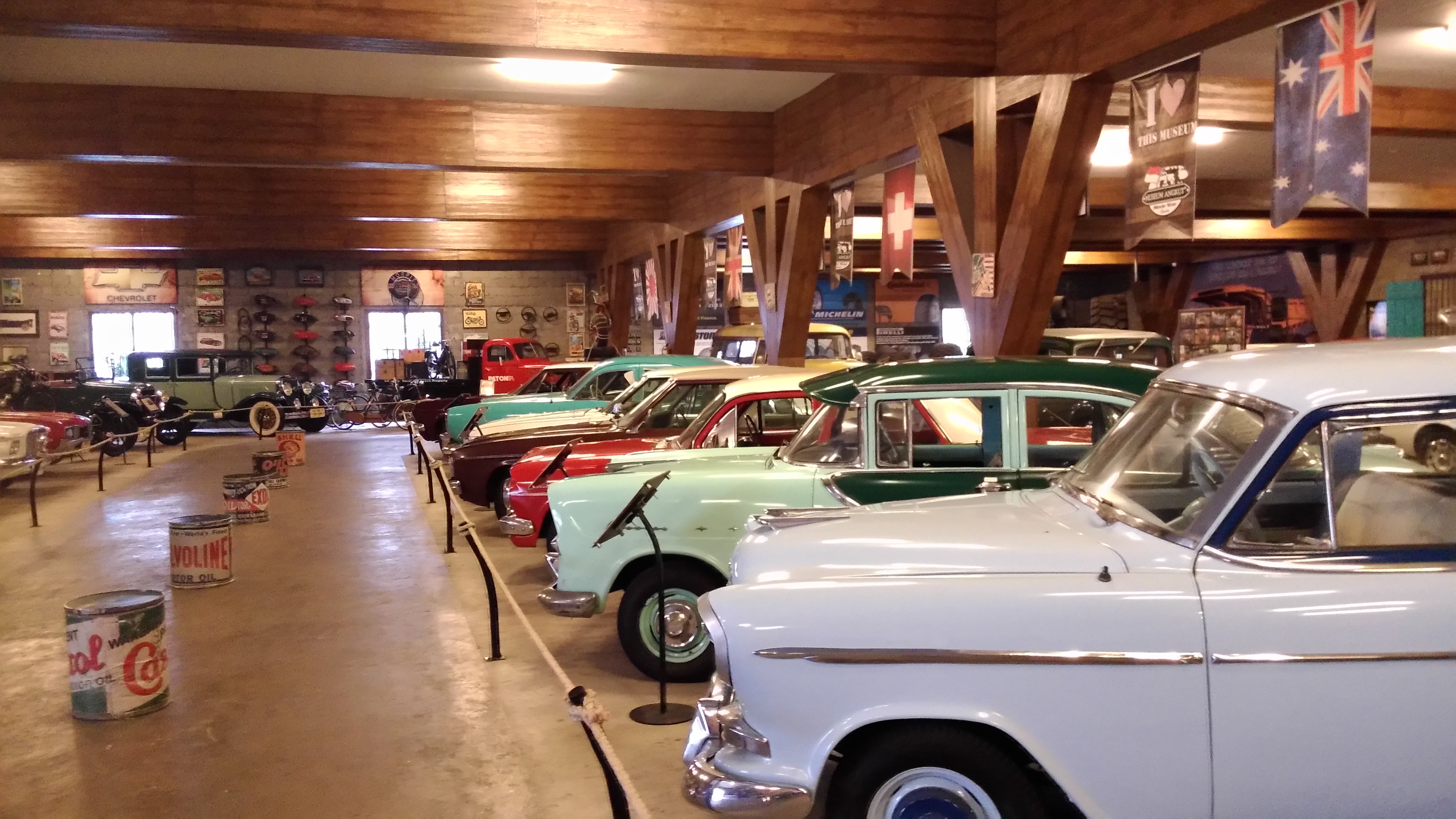
Batu Transport Museum (Museum Angkut)

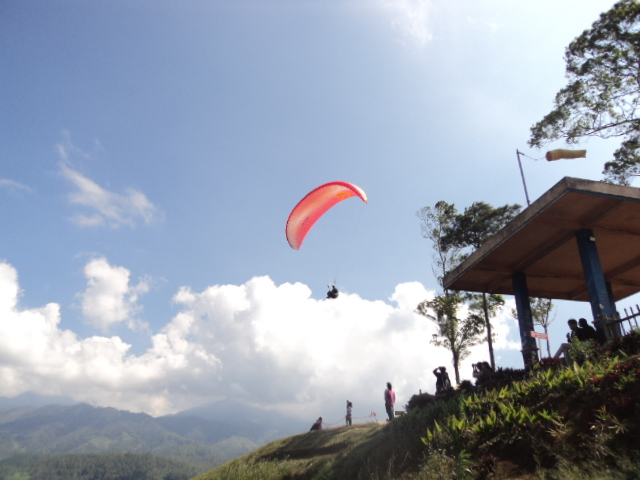
Batu para gliding Banyak Mountain

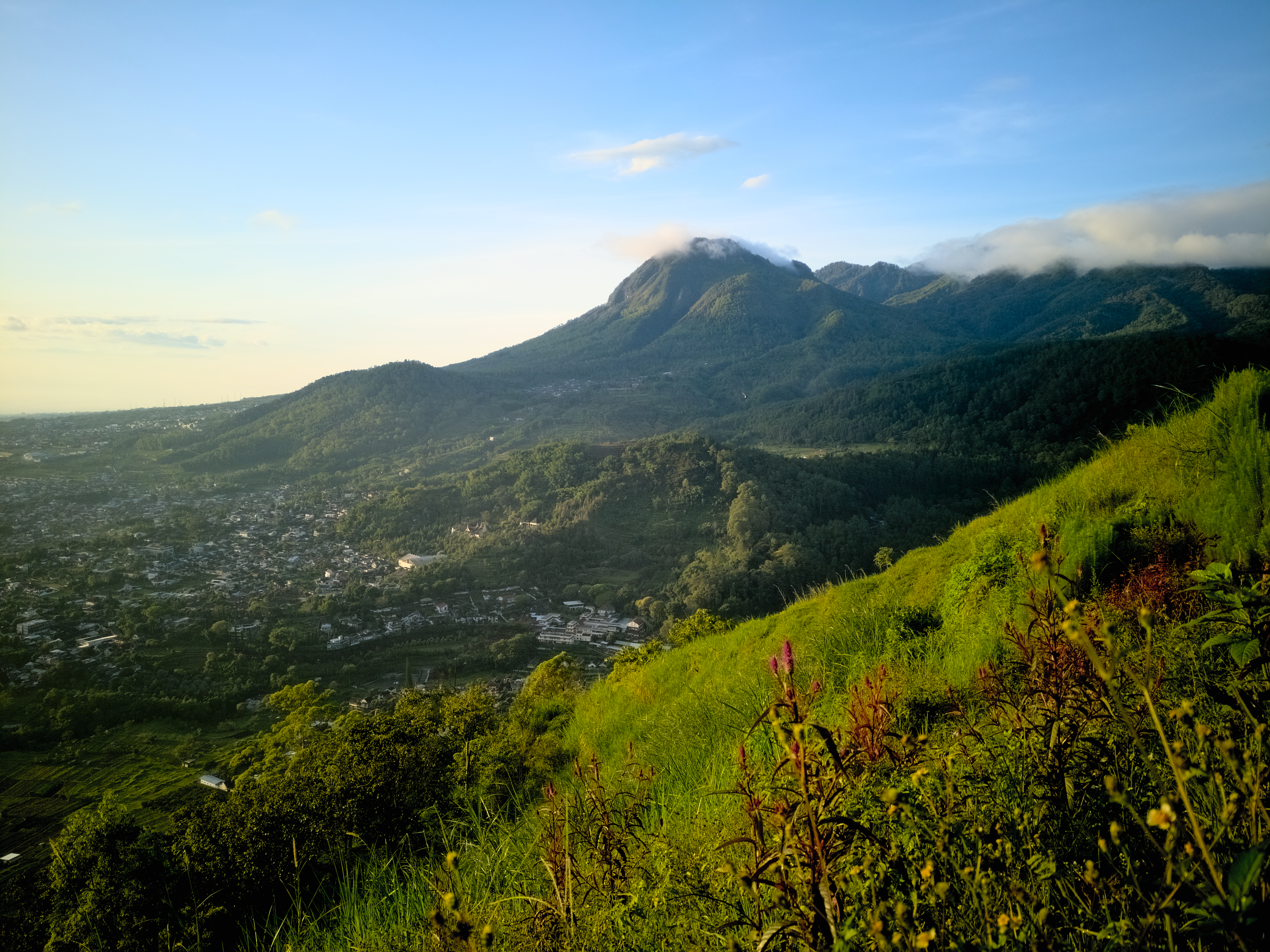
Panderman mountain

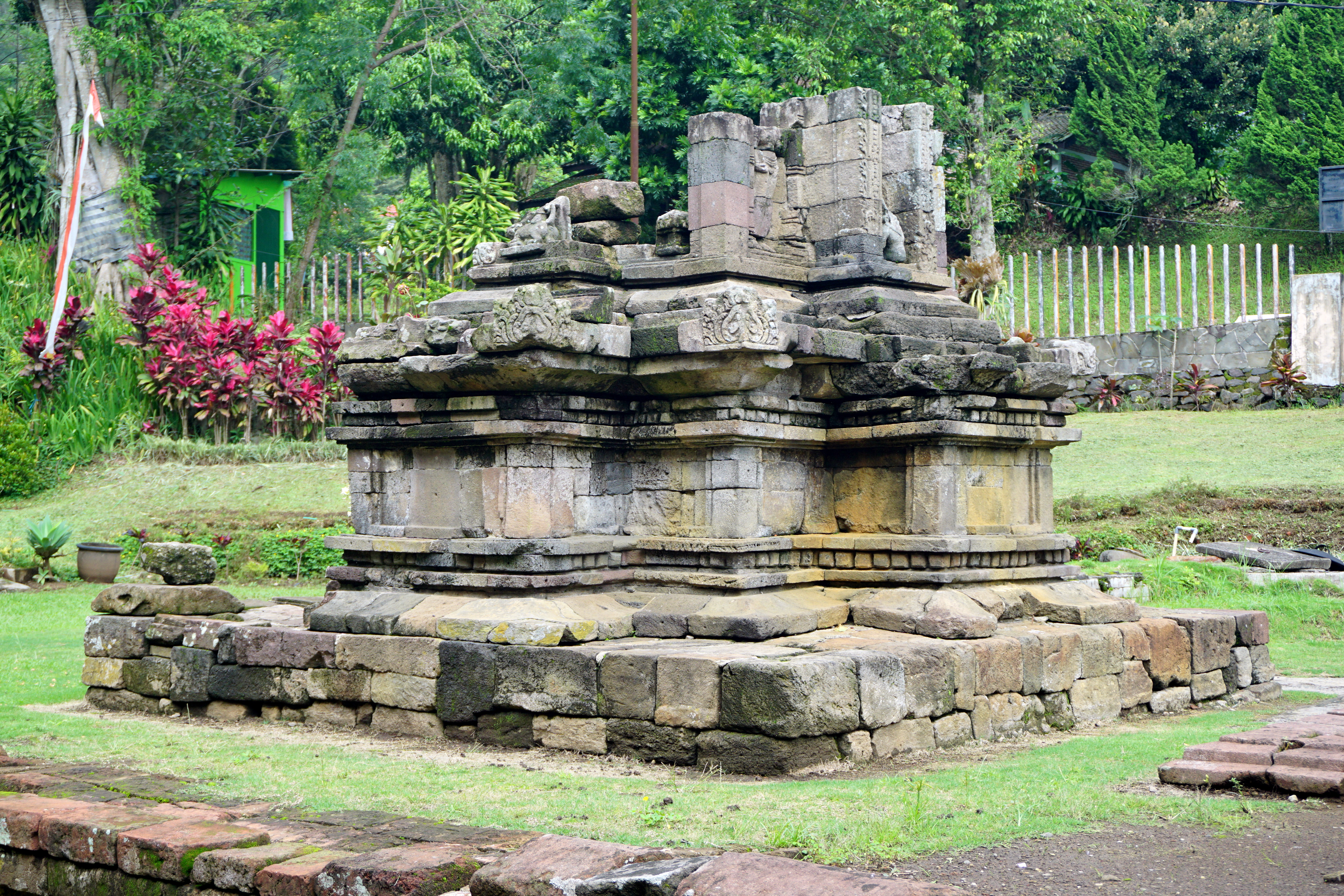
Remains of Songgoriti temple
