= 2024 Sampang regency election =

- 27 November 2024
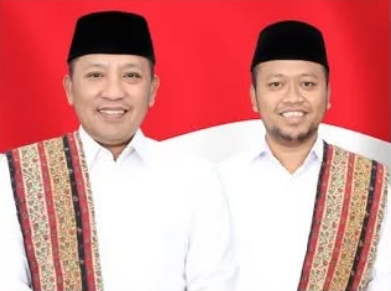

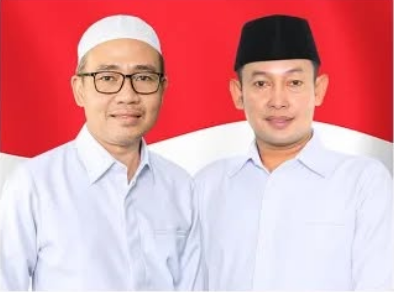
Candidate	Slamet Junaidi	Muhammad Bin Muafi Zaini
Party	NasDem	Golkar
Running mate	Ahmad Mahfudz	Abdullah Hidayat
Popular vote	338,482	294,605
Percentage	53.47%	46.53%
Regent before election
Rudi Arifiyanto (act.)
Independent
Elected Regent
Slamet Junaidi
NasDem

The 2024 Sampang regency election was held on 27 November 2024 as part of nationwide local elections to elect the regent of Sampang Regency, East Java for a five-year term. The previous regent Slamet Junaidi of the NasDem Party defeated Golkar challenger Muhammad bin Muafi Zaini to secure a second term. During the election's campaigning, a violent incident causing the death of one person resulted in heightened security measures during the voting process.

== Background ==
Sampang Regency, in Madura Island of East Java, has had a track record of cheating, disputes, and violent conflict in elections. A large-scale riot broke out after the 1997 election due to voter manipulation by the ruling party Golkar, forcing the government to repeat the election there. Indications of cheating were raised in 2004, 2008, 2009, 2012, 2014, and 2018, with violent protests against the election result in 2018. Irregularities in the 2018 election even resulted in the Constitutional Court of Indonesia ordering the entire election be repeated.

== Electoral system ==
The election, like other local elections in 2024, follow the first-past-the-post system where the candidate with the most votes wins the election, even if they do not win a majority. It is possible for a candidate to run uncontested, in which case the candidate is still required to win a majority of votes "against" an "empty box" option. Should the candidate fail to do so, the election will be repeated on a later date.

According to the Sampang General Elections Commission (KPU), there were 737,832 eligible voters in the election, voting in 1,344 polling stations. Around 400 polling stations were considered "vulnerable" or "very vulnerable" security-wise by election authorities, and would receive additional security personnel. A budget of Rp 49.9 billion (USD 3.1 million) was put aside for the election by the regency government, though not all was used.

== Candidates ==
The regent of Sampang from 2019 to 2024, Slamet Junaidi (nicknamed "Ba Idi"), did not run with his former running mate Abdullah Hidayat. Junaidi instead ran with Ahmad Mahfudz, head of a local pesantren in Sampang. Junaidi, who was also a NasDem Party former legislator, received the endorsement of Nasdem, PKB, PKS, and Gerindra.

Running against Junaidi was Muhammad Bin Muafi Zaini, a Golkar politician and chair of the party's Sampang branch. He had been elected as a member of the East Java Regional House of Representatives in the 2019–2024 term. Zaini ran with Junaidi's former deputy Abdullah Hidayat of the United Development Party. The pair received further endorsements from PDI-P, PAN, Demokrat, Hanura, PBB, and PSI.

== Campaign ==
The official campaigning period for the election was set between 25 September and 23 November 2024. On 17 November 2024, as Junaidi visited the village of Ketapang Laok in Ketapang district to campaign, a local kyai felt slighted that he campaigned at another kyai's place. The kyai and his supporters proceeded to block off an exit to the village, resulting in Junaidi leaving the village through a different path. After he left, a scuffle resulted between a group of villagers and Junaidi's supporters in the village, resulting in the killing of a Junaidi supporter by three men armed with scythes.

Three rounds of public debates were initially planned for the election, all held in November 2024. However, the third debate was cancelled. The KPU denied that the incident at Ketapang resulted in the cancellation, but that the candidates had instead mutually agreed with local authorities to cancel it to maintain public order. On the election date, the Ketapang incident caused additional security forces would be sent to Sampang from the national and provincial governments, numbering five company-sized units including policemen from the Mobile Brigade Corps along with Indonesian Army and Indonesian Marine Corps soldiers.

== Results ==
Candidate	Running mate	Candidate party	Votes	%
Slamet Junaidi	Ahmad Mahfudz	NasDem Party	338,482	53.47
Muhammad bin Muafi Zani	Abdullah Hidayat	Golkar	294,605	46.53
Total			633,087	100.00
Valid votes			633,087	98.04
Invalid/blank votes			12,635	1.96
Total votes			645,722	100.00
Registered voters/turnout			737,832	87.52
Source: Sampang KPU

Due to indications of ballot manipulation, voting was repeated in two polling stations.

== Aftermath ==
Upon announcement of the election results, the Zaini-Hidayat team filed a lawsuit to the Constitutional Court of Indonesia (MK) alleging "massive and systematic cheating" in the election. MK rejected the lawsuit, citing the poor evidence provided. Junaidi and Mahfudz would be sworn in as regent and vice regent on 20 February 2025, along with most other regional leaders elected in 2024.

The Sampang District Court sentenced the three perpetrators of the Ketapang killing to 11 years in prison in May 2025.
