= Basofi Sudirman =

Indonesian military officer and politician

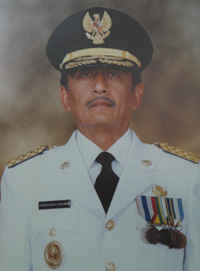
- Basofi as governor of East Java

Governor of East Java
- In office 28 August 1993 – 26 August 1998
- Preceded by: Soelarso
- Succeeded by: Imam Utomo

Vice Governor of Jakarta for Government and Security Affairs
- In office 19 December 1987 – 12 May 1993
- Governor: Wiyogo Atmodarminto; Soerjadi Soedirdja
- Preceded by: Eddie Marzuki Nalapraya
- Succeeded by: Muhammad Idroes

Personal details
- Born: 28 December 1940 Bojonegoro, Dutch East Indies
- Died: 7 August 2017 (aged 76) Jakarta, Indonesia

Military service
- Branch/service: Indonesian Army
- Years of service: 1963–1987
- Rank: Major general
- Commands: 512th Battalion, Kodam Brawijaya; Kodam Bukit Barisan
- Battles/wars: UNEF II; Operation Seroja

Basofi Sudirman (28 December 1940 – 7 August 2017) was an Indonesian military officer and politician. He was Governor of East Java between August 1993 and August 1998, and was previously Vice Governor of Jakarta between December 1987 and May 1993. He served in the Indonesian Army, reaching the rank of major general. He took part in the Garuda Contingent to Egypt and the Indonesian invasion of East Timor during his time in the army, and was commander of Kodam I/Bukit Barisan.

== Early life ==
Basofi Sudirman was born on 28 December 1940 in Bojonegoro. His father, Soedirman, was a santri and schoolteacher who became a military officer during the Indonesian National Revolution, and would eventually become a lieutenant general. In 1960, Basofi would enroll at the Indonesian Military Academy, and he graduated in 1963.

== Military career ==
After graduating from the Military Academy, Basofi joined the Kopassandha special forces unit, becoming commander of a combat detachment by 1971. In 1973, he was appointed as commander of the 512th battalion within Kodam Brawijaya. In December 1973, the 512th battalion was deployed to Egypt as part of the Garuda Contingent of United Nations Emergency Force II. Basofi, then ranked major, became chief of staff of the Indonesian contingent which was based in Ismailia. Basofi remained in Egypt until the contingent's return to Indonesia in September 1974.

The following year, Basofi commanded the battalion when it took part in the Indonesian invasion of East Timor. He had been promoted to lieutenant colonel by the time of the invasion, and was appointed commander of a joint task force. In 1977, Basofi was appointed commander of the 824th military district in Jember. After a stint at the Indonesian Army Command and General Staff College between 1978 and 1981, he returned to field service to become commander of the 18th airborne brigade of Kostrad (1981–1983), commander of Malang's military sub-region (1984–1986), and commander of Kodam Bukit Barisan before his retirement from service in 1987.

== Political career ==
While he was a brigadier general, Basofi was appointed Vice Governor of Jakarta under Wiyogo Atmodarminto by Presidential Order on 3 December 1987, and was sworn on 19 December to replace Eddie Marzuki Nalapraya. He concurrently served as chairman of Jakarta's branch of the ruling party Golkar. He resigned from his post as vice governor on 12 May 1993.

While he was vice governor in Jakarta, in 1992 he released a solo recording of the dangdut song "Tidak Semua Laki-Laki", which saw an unexpected success. Basofi wrote that Wijogo was concerned that President Suharto would not allow a high-ranking government official to enter entertainment. Instead, Suharto approved of Basofi's actions, with the recording being promoted by TVRI and used by Golkar in campaigns for the 1992 Indonesian legislative election. Basofi in 1994 claimed "with dangdut we will success-ify development". He would continue to feature in entertainment during his career in government – for instance, appearing as a guest star a TPI-hosted concert in 1996.

=== Governor of East Java ===
Basofi was then appointed Governor of East Java, being sworn in on 28 August 1993. His tenure as governor was strongly focused on political issues. In 1996, Basofi announced a provincial election committee for the 1997 Indonesian legislative election, which excluded members of the Indonesian Democratic Party citing the party's ongoing schism. East Java was considered important electorally, and many of (disputed) party chairman Megawati Sukarnoputri's internal opponents were based there. Basofi had in the previous year prohibited "politicking" at the 25-year commemoration of Sukarno's death at his grave in Blitar.

On 25 September 1993, four villagers were killed by security forces in Sampang, Madura related to the construction of a dam. With local demands to remove Sampang regent Bagus Hinayana from his post, Basofi instead claimed responsibility and refused to remove Hinayana. He also planned to develop a bridge between Surabaya and Madura, visiting Japan with Vice President B.J. Habibie in 1997 to discuss financing, but the Asian financial crisis shortly afterwards caused the project to be shelved.

He was replaced by Imam Utomo on 26 August 1998.

== Later life ==
Following his retirement from politics, several political parties offered Basofi party positions, but he refused. He also became active within the Nahdlatul Ulama organization, by 2003 becoming chairman of its economic institute. After two years of illness, Basofi died at the Medistra Hospital in Jakarta at 10:58 AM on 7 August 2017, and was buried at the San Diego Hills cemetery in Karawang the following day. He had three children and six grandchildren at the time of his death.
