= Sampang =

Sampang may refer to:

- Sampang (town), East Java, Indonesia
- Sampang Regency, a regency of Indonesia
- Sampang language, a Kiranti (Sino-Tibetan) language
