= Muhammad Noer =

Raden Panji Muhammad Noer
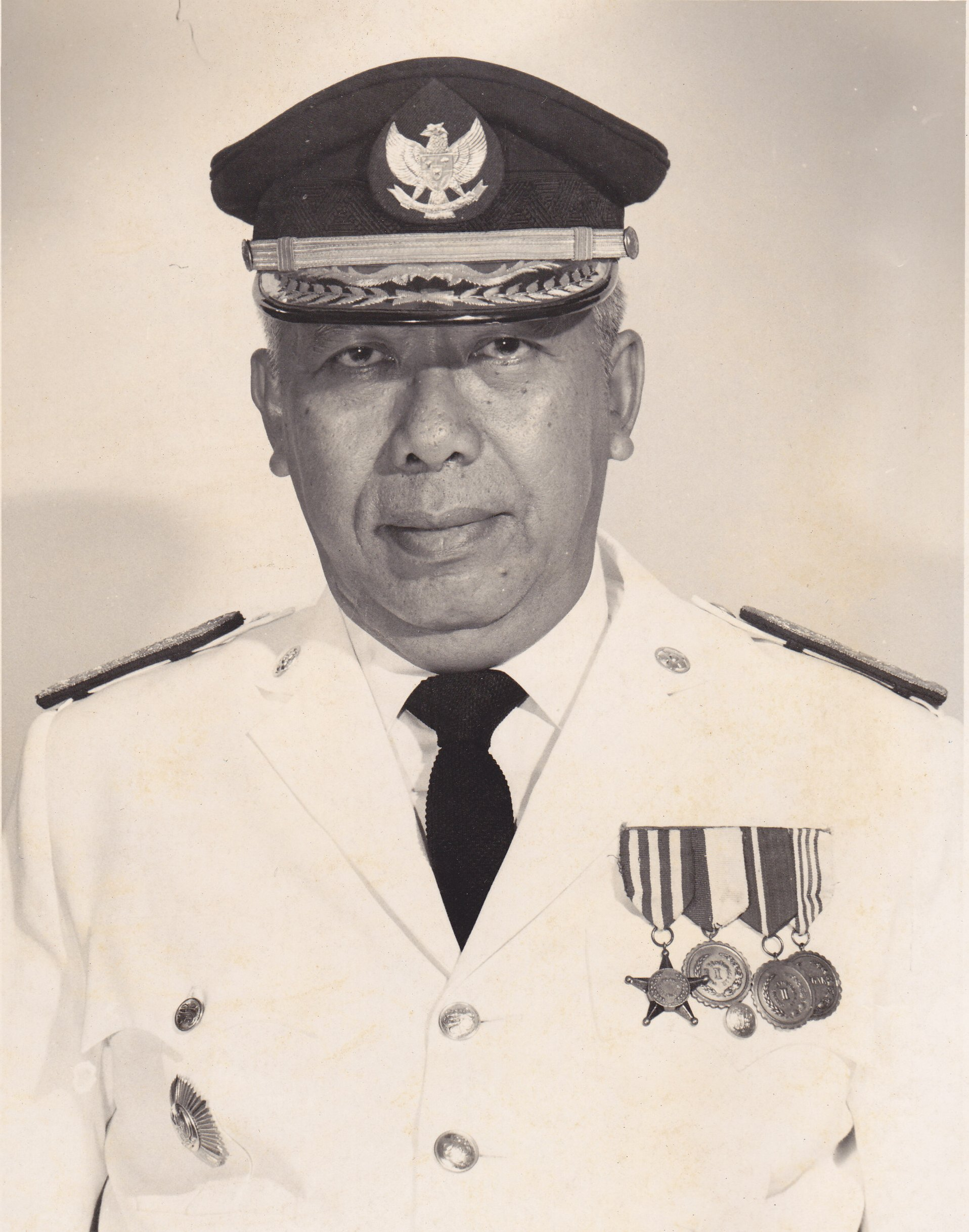
- Muhammad Noer in 1967

Ambassador of Indonesia to France
- In office 1976–1980
- President: Soeharto
- Preceded by: Achmad Tahir
- Succeeded by: Barli Halim

7th Governor of East Java
- In office 1967 – 26 January 1976
- President: Soeharto
- Preceded by: Mochamad Wijono
- Succeeded by: Soenandar Prijosoedarmo

Personal details
- Born: 13 January 1918 Rong Tengah, Sampang, Dutch East Indies
- Died: April 16, 2010 (aged 92) Surabaya, East Java, Indonesia
- Party: Golkar
- Spouse: Mas Ayoe Siti Rachma

Raden Panji Mohammad Noer (January 13, 1918 in Sampang Regency – April 16, 2010) was the Indonesian Governor of East Java from 1967 to 1976. He was also ambassador to France from 1976 to 1980.
