= Nipah Dam incident =

1993 shooting in Indonesia

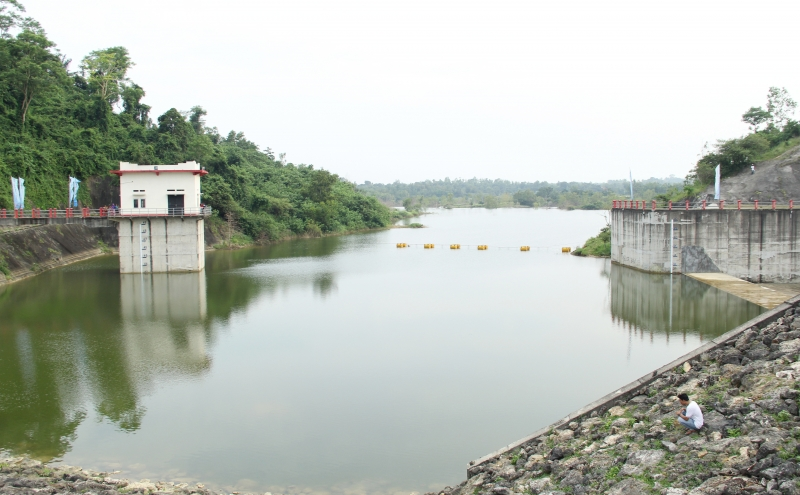
- The Nipah Dam in 2016
- Date: 25 September 1993
- Location: Banyuates, Sampang, East Java, Indonesia; 6°57′0″S 113°11′6″E

Parties
Indonesian Army; Indonesian Police	Local villagers

Casualties and losses
None	4 killed 4 injured

Security forces fired on a group of villagers protesting the construction of Nipah Dam in Sampang Regency, in Madura Island of Indonesia's East Java province, on 25 September 1993. Four villagers were killed. The incident followed a period of dispute over land acquisition for the dam's construction. Following the shooting, several soldiers and local security commanders were dismissed from their posts, and the dam's construction was suspended. Construction resumed in 2004.

== Background ==
In 1993, the Indonesian government compiled a plan to construct a number of dams for irrigation in East Java province. One of the dams was to be constructed on the Nipah River which flows through the Banyuates district of Sampang Regency in Madura, a region considered by the government as needing additional paddy fields to enable local food self-sufficiency. Construction to dam the Nipah had in fact begun more than ten years earlier, and proceeded from 1980 until 1983 without much issue, but had been suspended in 1986 due to funding shortages. To continue the project, the government attempted to acquire a further 120 hectares of land from villagers. This caused tension as some villagers refused to sell their land (which included mosques and burial grounds).

== Incident ==
As the project continued, villagers became increasingly restless as their requests to see the construction plans were ignored by the local government. The local military unit, Kodim Sampang, began to get involved, in one case arresting several landowners and coaxing them to sell their land. By September, villagers had begun to stop government workers from surveying land, leading Sampang's regent Bagus Hinayana to order that the villagers be briefed on the situation. During the briefing, Hinayana threatened villagers that they would be shot if they obstructed the project; the majority of those in attendance responded by walking out. At Hinayana's request, Kodim Sampang soldiers began to accompany the surveyors. Hinayana later claimed that the protesters were not locals and were from other villages.

On 25 September 1993, surveyors accompanied by 20 soldiers and policemen headed to a site at the village of Planggran Barat, where according to them they encountered "hundreds" of villagers who were opposed to their presence. According to later reports by security forces, the villagers carried melee weapons and forced their way close to the surveyors, and after warning shots went unheeded the soldiers fired on the villagers. Surabaya's legal aid agency (LBH), however, wrote that the villagers carried no weapons, and were shot from a distance of 125 meters, not the 5 meters claimed in official reports. Three villagers were declared dead on the spot, and another died in hospital on 30 September. A further four villagers suffered injuries from gunshot.

== Aftermath ==
Madurese religious leader Kyai Alawy Muhammad, who had been a leader in opposing the dam's construction, made a joint statement with a number of Madurese ulama demanding punishment of the killers. The New Order government began to involve local ulama after the incident in order to calm the situation. Minister of Home Affairs Yogie Suardi Memet announced that "sanctions would be imposed" on Hinayana, and the provincial government of East Java under governor Basofi Sudirman asserted that the incident was Hinayana's responsibility. Despite these statements, along with demands from locals, Hinayana was not removed from his post, and served until the end of his term in 1995. In October 1993, soldiers who had committed the killings were punished by a court-martial, and the commanders of Kodim Sampang and the Sampang District Police were dismissed from their posts.

The dam project itself was suspended following the killings. Construction resumed in 2004, and was completed in 2008, but land acquisition delayed the use of the dam until 2015 (and some land acquisition disputes remained outstanding as of 2018). The dam was inaugurated by President Joko Widodo on 19 March 2016. As of 2025, the dam supplies water to 1,150 hectares of paddy fields, which had previously been rain-fed.
