= Samadikoen =

Indonesian politician (1902–1971)

Raden Samadikoen
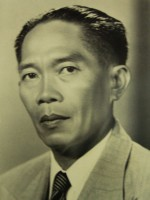
- Portrait, c. date unknown

Governor of East Java
- In office 24 December 1949 – 4 August 1958
- Preceded by: Murdjani
- Succeeded by: R.T.A. Milono

Personal details
- Born: 8 March 1902 Jombang, Surabaya, Dutch East Indies (now Indonesia)
- Died: 1971 (aged 68–69)
- Spouse: Moebandi
- Children: 6

Raden Samadikoen (EYD: Samadikun; 8 March 1902 – 1971) was an Indonesian politician who served as the governor of East Java from 1949 to 1958. He also served as the resident of Madiun before he was appointed governor. He previously worked in the colonial service.

== Early life ==
Samadikoen was born on 8 March 1902 in Jombang in what is present-day East Java, Indonesia. The area was then a part of the Surabaya Residency, Dutch East Indies. His father, Kusumowisastro, was a retired controleur in Jombang. He received an education at the Hollandsch-Inlandsche School in Jombang, and later at a Opleiding School Voor Inlandsche Ambtenaren in Blitar. He continued his studies at the Bestuurschool in Batavia (now Jakarta).

After graduating, Samadikoen joined the colonial civil service, being assigned to Lamongan. He would go on to serve in various positions, including as a district head in Surabaya, the secretary to the regent of Magetan, the assistant district head of Dolopo, the district head of Ponorogo, and finally as a patih in Kediri. He later became the resident of Madiun.

== Governorship ==
Following the arrest of Murdjani by the Dutch, Samadikoen replaced him as the governor of East Java. During his governorship, the independence of the United States of Indonesia was recognized in the Round Table Conference in 1949. He also oversaw the integration of the Dutch-backed State of East Java into the province of East Java a year later. His term as governor also saw the establishment of the second-oldest university in Indonesia, Airlangga University, in 1954. Various factories would also be opened in East Java during his governorship, including a nail factory in Waru, a paper factory in Situbondo, a match factory in Pasuruan, and a concrete factory in Gresik.

== Personal life ==
He was married to a woman named Moebandi, they had 6 children together.
