= 2018 Sampang regency election =

Indonesian election

- Initial: 27 June 2018; Repeat: 27 October 2018
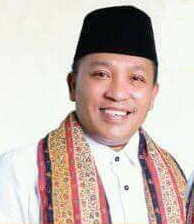

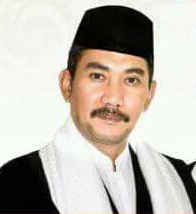

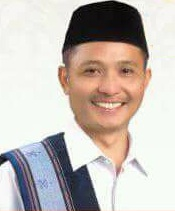
Candidate	Slamet Junaidi	Hermanto Subaidi	Hisan
Party	NasDem	PKB	Demokrat
Running mate	Abdullah Hidayat	Suparto	Abdullah Mansur
Popular vote	Initial: 257,121; Repeat: 307,126	Initial: 252,676; Repeat: 245,768	Initial: 166,059; Repeat: 24,746
Percentage	Initial: 38.04% Repeat: 53%	Initial: 37.39% Repeat: 43%	Initial: 24.57% Repeat: 4%
Regent before election
Fadhilah Budiono
PPP
Elected Regent
Slamet Junaidi
NasDem

The 2018 Sampang regency election was held on 27 June 2018, with a repeat election on 27 October 2018, to elect the regent of Sampang Regency in East Java for a five-year term. With the incumbent regent ineligible for reelection, Nasdem Party member of the House of Representatives Slamet Junaidi defeated two other candidates.

The initial election was held concurrently with other local elections across Indonesia. With irregularities in the voter list and abnormal results in some districts, clashes occurred between supporters of opposing candidates following the initial election. A lawsuit was filed, and the Constitutional Court of Indonesia ordered the election be repeated. Junaidi, who narrowly won the initial election, would widen his margin of victory in the repeat election.

== Background ==
Sampang Regency, in Madura Island of East Java, has had a track record of cheating, disputes, and violent conflict in elections. A large-scale riot broke out after the 1997 election due to voter manipulation by the ruling party Golkar, forcing the government to repeat the election there. Indications of cheating were raised in 2004, 2008, 2009, 2012, and 2014. Election watchdogs considered the risk of cheating in Sampang to be among the highest in East Java province.

== Electoral system ==
The election, like other local elections in 2018, follow the first-past-the-post system where the candidate with the most votes wins the election, even if they do not win a majority. It is possible for a candidate to run uncontested, in which case the candidate is still required to win a majority of votes "against" an "empty box" option. Should the candidate fail to do so, the election will be repeated on a later date.

The General Elections Commission (KPU) in Sampang conducted the election at 1,415 polling stations, slightly less than in Sampang's previous regency election in 2012.

== Candidates ==
The previous elected regent, Fadhilah Budiono, was ineligible to run as he had previously served two terms between 1995 and 2006, and was reelected as vice regent in 2013. He was appointed regent for a third term in 2017 due to the death of the 2013–2018 regent Fanna Hasib.

One of the candidates in the election is Hisan, a member of the East Java Regional House of Representatives from the Democratic Party. He received endorsements from his own party and the National Mandate Party. His running mate, Abdullah Mansur, served as a member of Sampang's local legislature from the National Awakening Party (PKB), although he did not receive the party's endorsement and he was removed from the party and the legislature due to his participation in the election.

Former municipal bureaucrat Hermanto Subaidi also contested the election, with the endorsement of the PKB and the Gerindra Party. Subaidi had previously served as the regional secretary (highest ranking civil servant in a local government) of Sampang until his controversial firing by regent Noer Tjahja in April 2012. Subaidi was a member of Gerindra, while his running mate Suparto was a local PKB politician. Subaidi had previously taken part in Sampang's 2012 election, narrowly losing to Fanna Hasib in a six-way race.

House of Representatives (DPR) member from the Nasdem Party, Slamet Junaidi, also took part in the election. He had been elected in the 2014 Indonesian legislative election representing Madura Island, and resigned his DPR seat to run in the election. His running mate, Abdullah Hidayat, served as a village head in Sampang and headed the association of village heads in the regency. The ticket received the support of Nasdem, PKS, Golkar, PPP, and PDI-P.

== Campaign ==
KPU held two rounds of public debates between the candidates in the leadup to the election, held on 5 May and 19 June 2018. The first round of debates lacked a head-to-head questions session between candidates, though this was added in the second round.

== Results ==
=== Initial ===
Candidate	Running mate	Candidate party	Votes	%
Slamet Junaidi	Abdullah Hidayat	Nasdem	257,121	38.04
Hermanto Subaidi	Suparto	PKB	252,676	37.39
Hisan	Abdullah Mansur	Demokrat	166,059	24.57
Total			675,856	100.00

Out of fourteen districts in Sampang, Junaidi–Hidayat won in six, Subaidi–Suparto won in seven, and Hisan–Mansur won in one.

=== Protest and lawsuit ===
Following the announcement of the election results, protests were held by supporters of Subaidi–Suparto in front of Sampang's KPU and election watchdog (Panwaslu) offices, demanding a repeat of the election. Protesters also briefly blocked a major arterial road in Madura, closing road access to other regencies in the island. Two people were injured in clashes between protesters and the police.

Their campaign team filed a lawsuit in the Constitutional Court of Indonesia (MK), claiming that the voter database in the election were irregular. In particular, they noted that the electorate of just over 800 thousand was 95 percent of Sampang's total population, despite all voters being adults. The plaintiffs also pointed out the irregularly high turnout, which reached 100 percent in Ketapang district. MK accepted this argument and on 5 September 2018 ordered the election be repeated with an updated voter list within 60 days of 5 September. In October, KPU announced that the repeat election would have around 36 thousand names removed from the voter list, ending up with 767,032 eligible voters.

=== Repeat ===
To improve security ahead of and during the repeat election, the Indonesian Army and Indonesian National Police deployed around seven thousand personnel to Sampang, including over five thousand policemen. They were deployed so that each polling station would be guarded by at least two policemen and one soldier.

Candidate	Running mate	Candidate party	Votes	%
Slamet Junaidi	Abdullah Hidayat	Nasdem	307,126	53.17
Hermanto Subaidi	Suparto	PKB	245,768	42.55
Hisan	Abdullah Mansur	Demokrat	24,746	4.28
Total			577,640	100.00

Another lawsuit was filed at MK, which upheld the repeat election's results. Junaidi and Hidayat would be sworn in as regent and vice regent on 30 January 2019.
