= Arisandi =

Arisandi is an Indonesian name. Notable people with the surname include:

- Jeki Arisandi (born 1990), Indonesian footballer
- Prigi Arisandi (born 1976), Indonesian biologist
