= Ardi Hermawan =

Indonesian diplomat (born 1964)

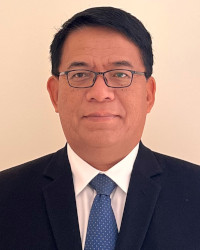

Ambassador of Indonesia to Bahrain
- Incumbent
- Assumed office 25 October 2021
- President: Joko Widodo; Prabowo Subianto
- Preceded by: Nur Syahrir Rahardjo

Personal details
- Born: February 11, 1964 (age 62) Padang, West Sumatra, Indonesia
- Spouse: Yulina Puspasari
- Education: Airlangga University (Drs.); Monash University (MA)

Ardi Hermawan (born 11 February 1964) is an Indonesian diplomat who is serving as ambassador to Bahrain since 2021. Prior to his appointment, he served in a number of government roles, including as consul general in San Francisco, assistant deputy for Asia Pacific marketing, and director for investment management in the ministry of tourism.

== Early life and education ==
Born in Padang on 11 February 1964, Ardi studied sociology program at the Airlangga University before he switched to the newly established International Relations program in 1982, becoming part of its inaugural cohort. He served as the first head of the major's student association. His passion for languages and reading, which he cultivated by reading French magazines to practice the language, would prove to be a significant asset in his future career. He undertook a research program at the Australian National University in 1992 and received his master's degree at the Monash University a year later.

== Career ==
After his studies, Ardi Hermawan joined the foreign ministry in 1988 and completed his basic diplomatic training in 1989. His proficiency in French led to his first diplomatic assignment at the embassy in Paris with the rank of second secretary in 1994. He served in Paris for four years until he returned to Jakarta in 1998, serving as a section chief in the North European Division within the Europe directorate of the foreign ministry. A year later, he completed his mid-level diplomatic training.

Ardi was promoted as the deputy director (chief of subdirectorate) for South Europe in 2000 after completing his mid-level diplomatic education. In 2002, the foreign department underwent a major reorganization, and he was placed at the embassy in Budapest with the rank of counsellor. Upon a four-year stint in Budapest, he undertook senior diplomatic education in 2006.

His career progressed subsequently, and from 2006 to 2008 he was appointed as chief of planning in the foreign ministry's personnel bureau. He was assigned to the embassy in Tokyo, where he became chief of political affairs with the rank of minister counsellor, before being promoted in 2010 as the deputy chief of mission until 2012. He was then appointed as director for consular affairs on 5 January 2012, serving in the position until 2014.

Upon service in the foreign ministry, Ardi was appointed as the consul general in San Francisco, where he received recognition from the United States Department of State on 21 November 2014. During his tenure, Ardi welcomed the arrival of President Joko Widodo at the city. He also oversaw the introduction of the Kartu Masyarakat Indonesia di Luar Negeri (KMILN), a card designed for Indonesian citizens living abroad, offering them recognition and potential benefits. He served as consul general in 2017, before being appointed as assistant deputy for Asia Pacific marketing in the tourism ministry in 2018. Shortly after his appointment, the ministry was reorganized with the creative economy agency to form the Ministry of Tourism and Creative Economy/Tourism and Creative Economy agency. He was appointed as the director of investment management in the new agency on 5 February 2020.

On 4 June 2021, Ardi was officially nominated by President Joko Widodo as ambassador to Bahrain. Upon passing an assessment by the House of Representative's first commission in July, Ardi was installed on 25 October. He presented his credentials to the King of Bahrain Hamad bin Isa Al Khalifa on 8 February 2022.

== Personal life ==
Ardi Hermawan is married to Yulina Puspasari, whom he met during his studies at the Airlangga University. The couple has three children.
