= Slamet Junaidi =

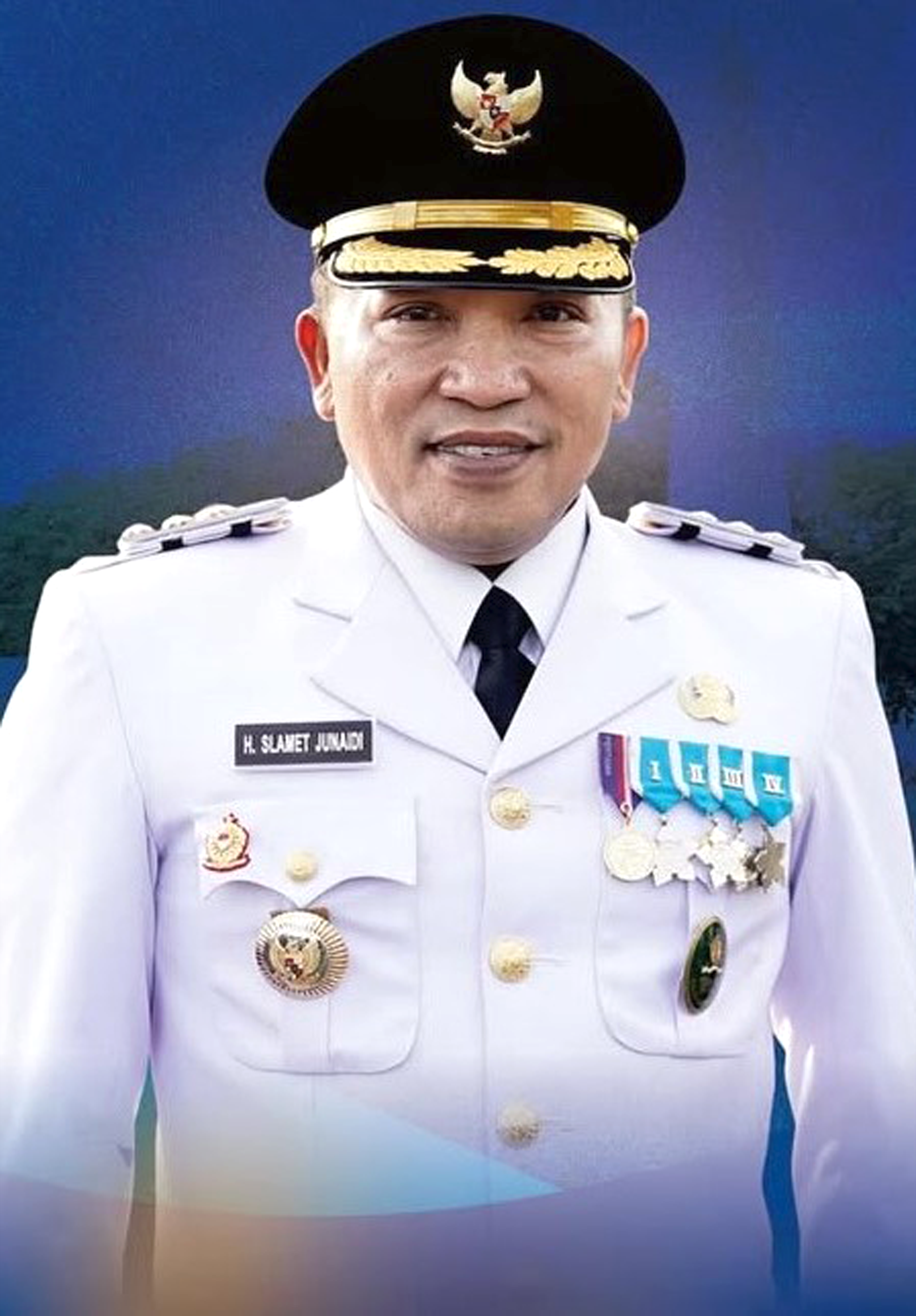
- Junaidi in 2025

Regent of Sampang
- Incumbent
- Assumed office 20 February 2025
- Preceded by: Rudi Arifiyanto (act.)
- In office 30 January 2019 – 30 January 2024
- Preceded by: Fadhilah Budiono
- Succeeded by: Rudi Arifiyanto (act.)

Member of the House of Representatives
- In office 1 October 2014 – 2018
- Succeeded by: Dja'far Shodiq
- Constituency: East Java XI
- Majority: 167,733

Personal details
- Born: 17 August 1972 (age 53) Sampang, East Java, Indonesia
- Party: NasDem Party

Slamet Junaidi (born 17 August 1972) is an Indonesian businessman and politician of the NasDem Party who has served as regent of Sampang Regency, East Java since February 2025 and previously in 2019–2024. He was also a Nasdem member of the House of Representatives representing Madura in 2014–2018.

== Early life ==
Slamet Junaidi was born on 17 August 1972 at the village of Nyeloh, within Kedungdung district of Sampang Regency. Junaidi was the fifth of seven children. His mother Jubaedah originated from the same village, while his father Hasan Basri came from the main town of Sampang. Basri abandoned the family during Junaidi's childhood, leaving the family in significant debt. After completing middle school at Sampang in 1988, Junaidi migrated to Jakarta to find work while his mother moved to work in Saudi Arabia.

He would later obtain a high school diploma in 2012 through the "Paket C" adult high school program, and a bachelor's degree in political science from an institute in Sukabumi in 2016.

== Career ==
After some time in Jakarta, Junaidi moved to Bogor in 1991, and he started a scrap iron business there in 1996. He also took part in Madurese associations, becoming chairman of the Bogor Madurese Association in 1996.

In 2013, Junaidi joined the NasDem Party and the following year he ran for a seat in the House of Representatives (DPR) from East Java's 11th district, covering the four regencies in the island of Madura. He was elected to the legislature with 167,733 votes, the second-highest of all Nasdem candidates nationwide.

As a DPR member, Junaidi became a member of its Sixth Commission, which covered trade and business competition. As part of this commission, Junaidi supported opening refined sugar imports to Indonesia, but only to state-owned companies. He also called for the government to issue regulations protecting traditional wet markets from competition from modern supermarkets. In 2015, when it was revealed that DPR speaker Setya Novanto had asked for shares at Freeport Indonesia, Junaidi became one of 30 DPR members which signed a petition demanding his resignation. He resigned from DPR in 2018 to run in the 2018 Sampang regency election, and he was replaced by Dja'far Shodiq.

=== Regent of Sampang ===
Junaidi, with Abdullah Hidayat as running mate, was elected regent of Sampang in its 2018 election after a repeat vote, securing 307,126 votes (53.2%) in a three-way race. They were sworn in as regent and vice regent on 30 January 2019. His first term expired on 30 January 2024, and he ran for a second term in the 2024 Sampang regency election with Ahmad Mahfudz as his new running mate. During campaigning for the election, Junaidi's visit to a village triggered a scuffle, which eventually resulted in the killing of one of Junaidi's supporters. In the aftermath of the murder, additional security forces were deployed in Sampang to safeguard the election. Junaidi eventually won 338,382 votes (53.5%) in the election, and was sworn in for a second term on 20 February 2025.

During his first term, the COVID-19 pandemic occurred, and much of the regency government's focus was on economic recovery from pandemic-related layoffs and collapse in tourism. The regency government further worked with BPJS Kesehatan to expand the service's coverage in Sampang, and integrate the national coverage with the municipal health service. Junaidi would receive an award from the Coordinating Ministry for Human Development and Cultural Affairs for his involvement in the program. Junaidi also supported the separation of Madura as its own province.

== Personal life ==
Junaidi married to Mimin Haryati (1973–2024) in 1994, and the couple had four children.
