= Ario Soerjo =

Indonesian politician (1898–1948)

Raden Mas Tumenggung Ario Soerjo
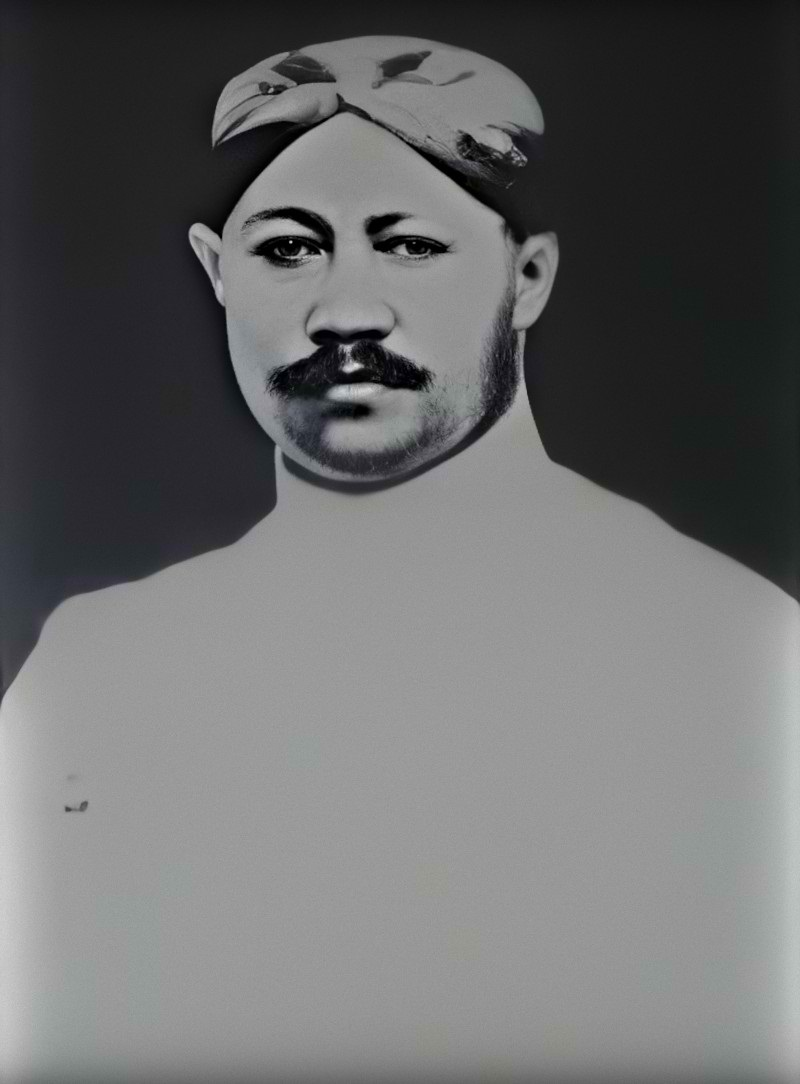
- Ario Soerjo

Chairman of the Supreme Advisory Council
- In office April 1948 – 10 November 1948
- President: Sukarno
- Preceded by: Wiranatakusumah V
- Succeeded by: Soetardjo Kartohadikusumo

1st Governor of East Java
- In office 1945–1947
- President: Sukarno
- Preceded by: Office established
- Succeeded by: Moerdjani

Personal details
- Born: 9 July 1898 Magetan, Dutch East Indies
- Died: November 10, 1948 (aged 50) Bago, Ngawi, Indonesia
- Spouse: Raden Ayu Mustapeni

Raden Mas Tumenggung Ario Soerjo (EYD: Ario Suryo) (9 July 1898 – 10 November 1948) is now regarded as a National Hero of Indonesia. Soerjo and two policemen were captured by pro-communist (PKI) troop at Walikukun, Widodaren, Ngawi on 9 November 1948, and their dead bodies were found afterwards.

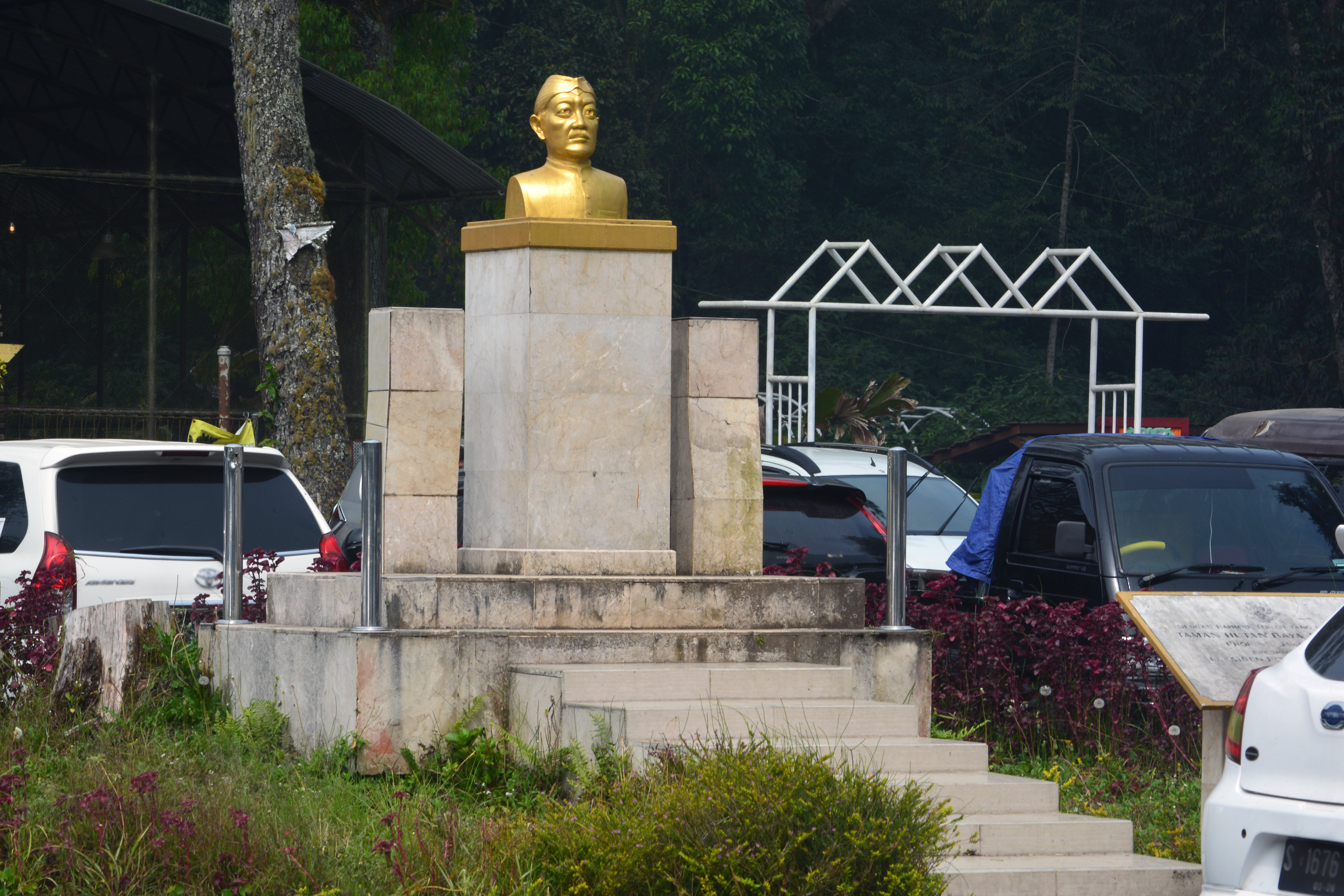
Head Bust of Ario Soerjo in Raden Soerjo Forest Park, East Java

== Education ==
Suryo's education is a graduate of OSVIA (abbreviation of Opleiding School Voor Inlandsche Ambtenaren), namely the Civil Service Education School for native/Indonesian youth during the Dutch East Indies era. Suryo also had the opportunity to study at Politie-School (Police School) in Sukabumi, West Java and at Bestuursschool or Bestuurs Academie or Department of Home Affairs in Batavia (Jakarta).

== National Revolution ==
Suryo made a ceasefire agreement with the commander of British troops, Aubertin Mallaby, in Surabaya on 26 October 1945. However, three days of fighting still erupted in Surabaya, 28–30 October, which pushed the British back. Sukarno decided to come to Surabaya to reconcile the two parties.

The agreed ceasefire was not fully known to the native fighters. Still, there was gunfire that killed Mallaby. This angered the British troops. The troop commander, Robert Mansergh, gave the people of Surabaya an ultimatum to hand over all weapons by 9 November, or the next day Surabaya would be destroyed. Responding to this ultimatum, Sukarno left the decision entirely in the hands of the East Java government, namely to refuse or surrender. Suryo firmly made a speech on RRI that:
"The people of Surabaya would fight the British ultimatum until the last blood."

So a battle erupted between the people of East Java and the British in Surabaya which began on 10 November. For three weeks fighting took place where Surabaya finally became a dead city. Suryo was among the last to leave Surabaya to later establish an emergency government in Mojokerto.

== Death ==
On 10 November 1948, Suryo left Yogyakarta for Madiun to attend the 40-day commemoration of the death of his younger brother, R.M. Sarjoeno, one of the victims of the pro-PKI's murder. Suryo arrived in Surakarta in the afternoon and continued his journey to Madiun early in the morning by car. That's when Suryo's car ran into the remains of the pro-PKI troops. On 9 November 1948, the car of Ario Soerjo and two policemen was intercepted in Walikukun by pro-PKI troops. Suryo and two other passengers, namely Colonel Duryat and Major Suroko, were ordered to get out of the car, taken to the forest, and then killed by the pro-PKI troops. Suryo's body was found four days later, in Kali Kakah, Ngawi. and their bodies were found murdered afterwards.

Soerjo was buried in the Sasono Mulyo, a monument built to commemorate his services which is located in Kedunggalar, Ngawi. which was inaugurated on 28 October 1975 by Pangdam VII/Brawijaya Major General TNI Witarmin.
