= Yahya Zaini =

Indonesian politician

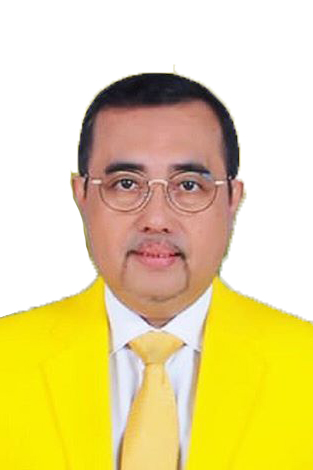

Member of People's Representative Council from East Java
- In office 2004–2009

Personal details
- Born: April 24, 1964 (age 61) Bawean, Indonesia
- Party: Golkar Party

Yahya Zaini (born April 24, 1964) is an Indonesian politician and former Member of Parliament in the People's Representative Council. He is a member of the Golkar Party.

== Early life ==
Born in Bawean, East Java, he is the son of KH Zaini and Ms. Khosniyah. Zaini attended Airlangga University and graduated with a BSc in law in 1990.

== Political career ==
Yahya became the Special Staff of the Minister of Youth and Sports Akbar Tandjung in 1993. The period from 1992 to 1994, he became the Chairman of the Islamic Students Association (HMI). Yahya continued to follow the success of Akbar, who was the Minister for Housing between 1993 and 1998. Between 1996 and 1998 he had led the Indonesian Youth National Committee.

Zaini served as Secretary of the Golkar party and is a member of Commission II of the House of Representatives. He has also been involved in the committee bill as chairman of the political party.
