= Eddie Marzuki Nalapraya =

Indonesian general and politician (1931–2025)

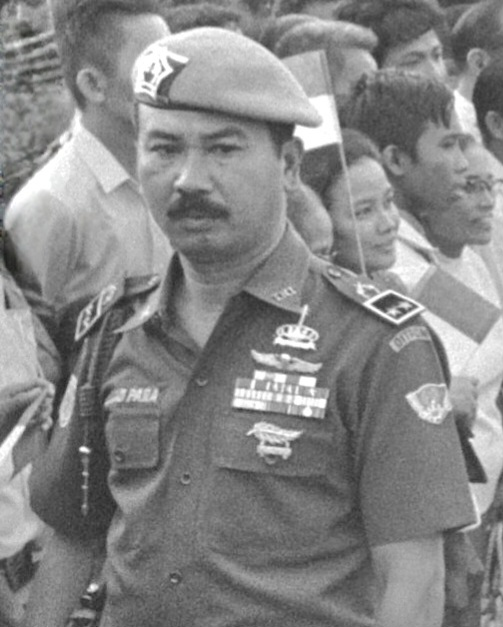
- Nalapraya in 1971

Member of the Supreme Advisory Council
- In office 13 June 1998 – 31 July 2003
- President: B. J. Habibie; Abdurrahman Wahid; Megawati Sukarnoputri

Vice Governor of Jakarta (Government Affairs)
- In office 5 April 1984 – 19 December 1987
- President: Suharto
- Governor: Soeprapto Djojoharsojo; Wiyogo Atmodarminto
- Preceded by: Abdul Chourmain
- Succeeded by: Basofi Sudirman

Personal details
- Born: 6 June 1931 Tanjung Priok, Batavia, Dutch East Indies
- Died: 13 May 2025 (aged 93) Jakarta, Indonesia
- Party: Golkar

Military service
- Allegiance: Indonesia
- Branch: Indonesian Army
- Service years: 1946–1986
- Rank: Major general
- Unit: Infantry
- Commands: Kosatgas
- Conflicts: Indonesian National Revolution; Congo Crisis; 30 September Movement

Eddie Marzuki Nalapraya (6 June 1931 – 13 May 2025) was an Indonesian bureaucrat, military officer and a pivotal figure in the development and internationalization of pencak silat, Indonesia’s traditional martial art. His leadership from the late 1970s through the early 2000s transformed pencak silat from a local cultural practice into a globally recognized sport and cultural heritage.

== Early life and education ==
Eddie Marzuki Nalapraya was born as Marzuki in Tanjung Priok on 6 June 1931 into a modest Betawi family. He was the eldest of nine children of Mohammad Soetarman, a mechanic at the Tanjung Priok harbor, and Marsati, a homemaker. Due to his mononym, he was nicknamed Si Juki. He felt uncomfortable with his nickname and added Eddie as his first name. His father later added "Nalapraya" as his last name, a term believed to mean "fiery mountain."

His grandfather, Haji Buchori, was a respected religious leader in Tanjung Priok who was known for his wisdom and community leadership. Under his grandfather's tutelage, Eddie not only learned to recite the Quran but was also introduced to pencak silat, which was taught alongside lessons in ethics and character.

Nalapraya's formative years were marked by a strong sense of discipline, religious devotion, and an early exposure to social realities. He attended elementary and junior high school in Tasikmalaya, West Java, after his family relocated there during the Indonesian National Revolution in 1947. During this period, he joined the Garuda Putih Detachment, where he was mentored by Captain Burdah and developed close ties with the family, including babysitting the young Rhoma Irama, who would later become a member of parliament and a dangdut musician.

== Career ==
Nalapraya began his military career in 1946 during the Indonesian National Revolution, where he served as a courier for the Indonesian Army. After the revolution ended, he was briefly assigned to infantry battalions in East Java and West Java before attending an administrative course for NCOs in 1951. He then attended a senior NCO course in 1955 before being sent by the army to quell the Revolutionary Government of the Republic of Indonesia in Sumatra and the Permesta rebellion in Sulawesi.

After quelling rebellions in different parts of Indonesia, Nalapraya was promoted to officer after attending the officer candidate school in Bandung in 1957. Three years later, he was sent as part of the Garuda Contingent in the United Nations Operation in the Congo. After a year of duty, in 1961 he was recalled to West Java, where he briefly became the aide-de-camp to the province's military commander, Ibrahim Adjie. The next year, he was sent to attend a military security course in Okinawa.

In November 1965, Nalapraya, already with the rank of captain, was re-assigned to Jakarta, where he became the commander of Kosatgas, the security detail of the-then army commander General Suharto. Nalapraya oversaw at least 80 soldiers in the Kosatgas. Despite this, he deemed the security insufficient and added a platoon of 20 soldiers and several armored vehicles to the detail. Furthermore, vehicles such as jeeps were modified with mounted machine guns and grenade launchers. Nalapraya also decided to install anti-tank mines on the road leading to Suharto’s house. Each evening, Nalapraya discreetly laid mines and removed them the following morning, ensuring that Suharto himself remained unaware of their presence. The anti-tank mines were never used, as no attacks occurred on Suharto.

After the issuance of the Supersemar, which solidified Suharto's position, the Kosatgas was disbanded. However, Suharto, impressed by Nalapraya's performance, requested that he remain as his personal security commander, leading the innermost ring of Suharto's protection. Nalapraya continued to accompany Suharto on various occasions, including fishing trips. After Suharto's first term, Nalapraya was honorably discharged from his security detail, and he attended the United States Army Command and General Staff College in 1972.

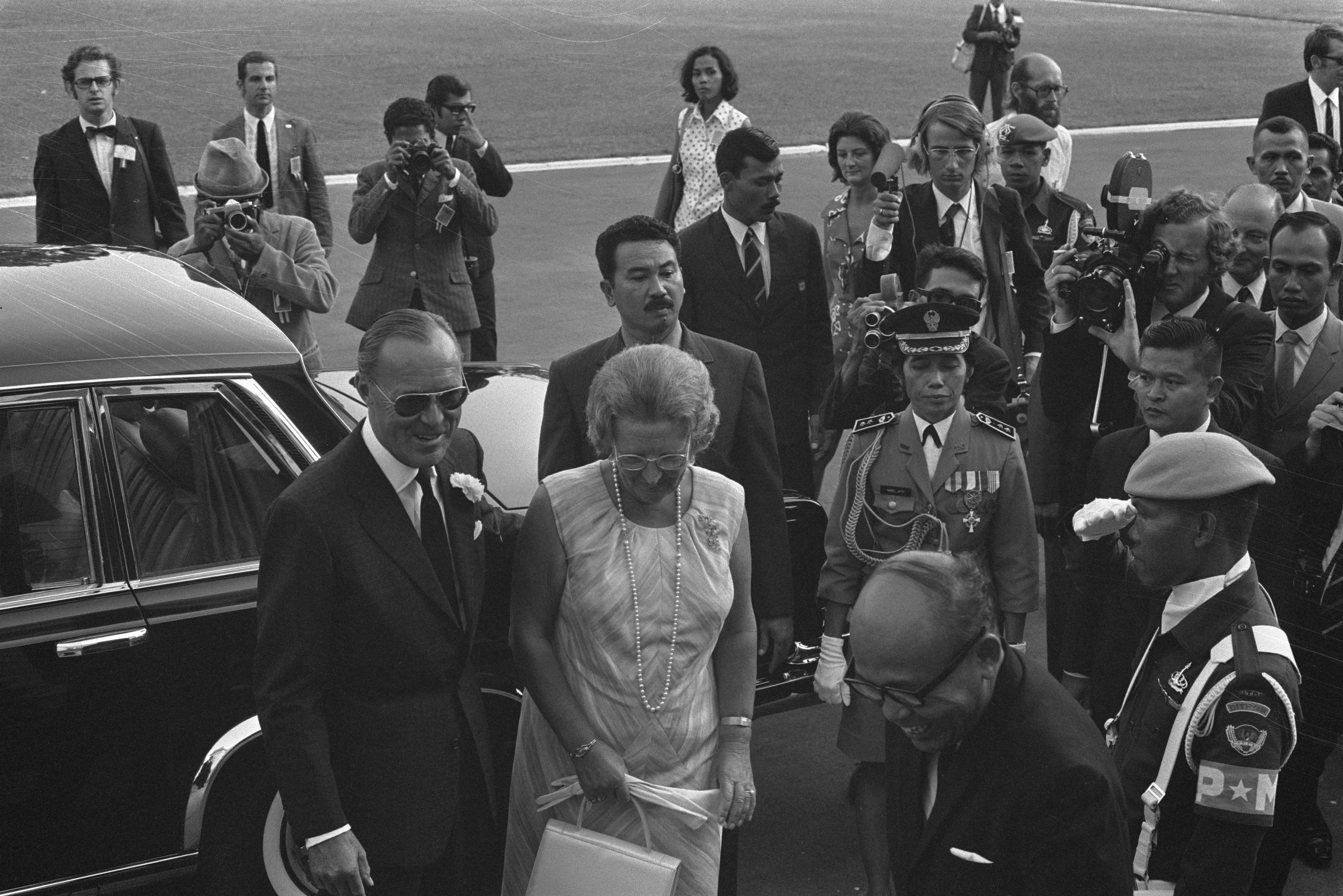
Nalapraya, standing behind Queen Juliana in 1971

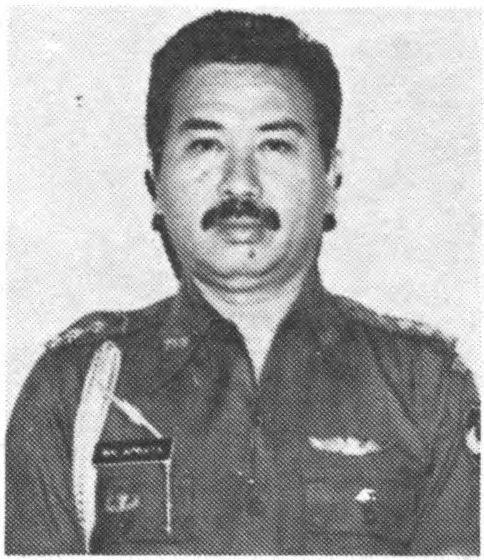
Nalapraya as the assistant for intelligence affairs in the Jakarta regional military command

Upon completing his assignment as Suharto's bodyguard, Nalapraya was assigned to the Jakarta regional military command, where in 1974 he became the deputy assistant for operations in the regional command. A year later, he was reassigned to the Jakarta garrison as assistant for security affairs before returning to the regional military command in 1977 as intelligence assistant until 1979. He served as the chief of staff of the Jakarta garrison from 1979, and later double-hatted as the chief of staff of the Jakarta regional military command on 24 December 1980. During his tenure in Jakarta's military command, Nalapraya became the "eyes and ears" to the military intelligence chief L. B. Moerdani in Jakarta.

During his tenure in Jakarta, Nalapraya was notorious for orchestrating student arrests. Following the 1978 student protests in Jakarta, he sent the students to a special prison, which he nicknamed as the "Yellow Campus" (in reference to the University of Indonesia's yellow alma mater jacket). For his role in the arrest, Nalapraya jokingly referred to himself as a rector. In 1980, he attended a student meeting at the University of Indonesia upon invitation, where he was quipped by the chairman of UI's student body, Biner Tobing.

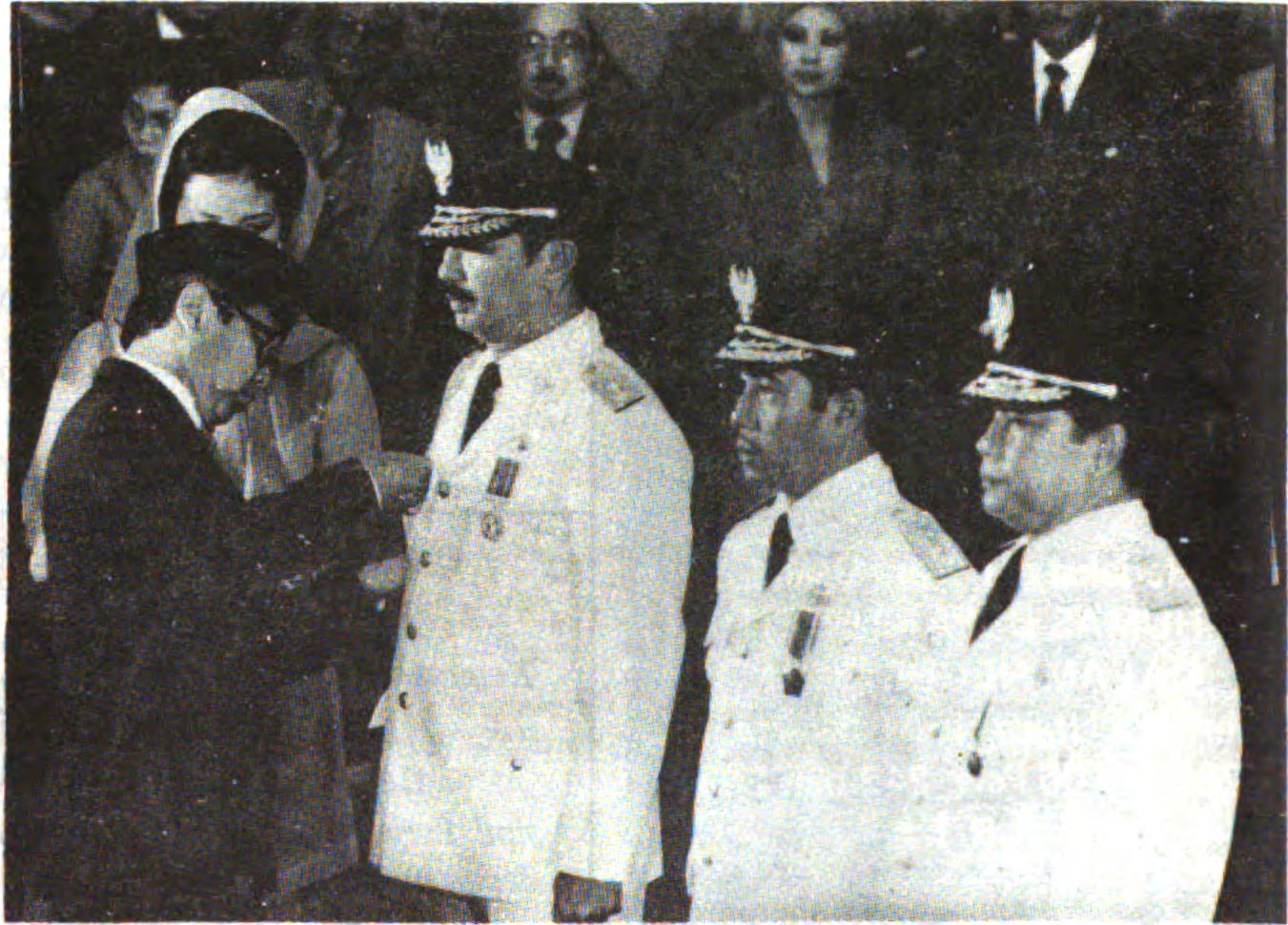
Minister of Home Affairs Soepardjo Rustam attaching an identification badge to Nalapraya (second from right) at his inauguration as vice governor

Nalapraya ended his tenure as Jakarta's regional military command and Jakarta garrison chief of staff on 25 May 1983. He was named as the assistant for territorial affairs to L. B. Moerdani, who had just been named as the armed forces commander in March, a week later. Less than a year later, on 5 April 1984, Nalapraya assumed office as the vice governor of Jakarta for political affairs. He continued his dual office until he handed over his position in the armed forces in November 1984. His term as vice governor ended following the inauguration of his replacement on 19 December 1987.

Nalapraya returned to politics following the Fall of Suharto. He joined president B. J. Habibie's Supreme Advisory Council on 13 June 1998. He became the member of the council's working body and the defense and security commission. He retained his membership until the council was dissolved on 31 July 2003.

== Pencak silat ==
Nalapraya's formal involvement in pencak silat organizations began in December 1978, when he was approached to lead the Jakarta branch of the Ikatan Pencak Silat Indonesia (IPSI), the national governing body for pencak silat. Despite initial hesitation, he accepted the role after being convinced by local leaders of his suitability. Upon his election as chairman of IPSI Jakarta, Nalapraya pledged to make the organization a national benchmark for both technical standards and organizational excellence. He faced significant challenges, including limited funding, low public interest compared to imported martial arts, and disharmony among local pencak silat schools. Nalapraya addressed these issues by fostering dialogue among silat masters, organizing regular championships, and promoting pencak silat as a vehicle for nation-building and character development. Nalapraya's success in Jakarta led to his appointment as the daily chairman of the IPSI Central Board in December 1979, and later as chairman of IPSI from 1981 to 2003). He was instrumental in standardizing competition rules, improving the quality of national tournaments, and integrating pencak silat into major sporting events such as the National Sports Week (PON) and the Southeast Asian Games (SEA Games).

In March 1980, Nalapraya founded the International Pencak Silat Federation (PERSILAT) in Jakarta, working with representatives from Singapore, Malaysia, and Brunei and becoming its first Chairman of the Presidium. This helped to spread pencak silat beyond the Malay world to Europe, the Americas, and Australia. In 1982, world championships were first held, starting with the first International Pencak Silat Invitational (Prasetya Mulya I) in Jakarta in 1982. PERSILAT and IPSI also worked closely with the Indonesian government and foreign embassies to establish pencak silat commissions in countries such as Australia, the Philippines, Thailand, Switzerland, the Netherlands, Belgium, France, Germany, the United States, and Suriname. The Indonesian Ministry of Foreign Affairs supported these efforts, recognizing pencak silat as a vital element of Indonesia’s cultural diplomacy. International championships continued to grow in scale and prestige, with the third world championship held in Vienna, Austria, in 1986, and subsequent events in The Hague, Netherlands, in 1990.

Nalapraya also played a role in securing pencak silat's inclusion as an official sport in the SEA Games, beginning with the 1987 edition in Jakarta. This milestone accelerated the spread of pencak silat throughout Southeast Asia, with countries such as Thailand, Vietnam, the Philippines, Myanmar, Laos, and Brunei establishing their own national programs. He also oversaw the construction of the Pencak Silat Training Center (Padepokan Pencak Silat) in Taman Mini Indonesia Indah, Jakarta, which became the central hub for training, competition, and cultural exchange. The center was inaugurated in 1997 by President Soeharto.

Although Nalapraya had expressed the desire to step down as early as 1993, his intentions were repeatedly opposed by IPSI officials at both central and regional levels, who consistently reelected him during successive congresses. A similar pattern occurred in the International Pencak Silat Federation (PERSILAT), where he was regularly appointed Chairman of the Presidium. At the end of his tenure on 4 July 2003, Nalapraya nominated Rachmat Gobel, who had been involved in IPSI for a period of time, as his replacement. Despite Gobel's acceptance, Suharto's son-in-law Prabowo Subianto suddenly declared his intention to contest the leadership, prompting Gobel to withdraw his candidacy. As the sole candidate, Prabowo was unanimously chosen as the new chairman of IPSI, with Gobel accepting the position of the daily chairman.

== Personal life and death ==
Nalapraya married Anne Marie, a woman of German-Javanese descent, with whom he had five children. After Anne Marie’s passing in 1963, he married Merry, an Indo-French-Bugis woman, who later became known as Mariam after performing the Hajj in 1976.

Nalapraya died at the Pondok Indah Hospital in Jakarta, on the morning of 13 May 2025, at the age of 93. His body was laid at the Pencak Silat Training Center before being interred at the Kalibata Heroes' Cemetery. Long before his death, Nalapraya once joked that he did not want to be buried at Kalibata Heroes' Cemetery because deceased generals there would still be giving him orders.

A number of prominent politicians delivered their condolences, including Nalapraya's successor, Prabowo Subianto, who became Indonesia's president, youth and sports minister Dito Ariotedjo, foreign minister Sugiono, Jakarta governors Anies Baswedan and Pramono Anung, and deputy governor Rano Karno.

== Orders, decorations and medals ==
Nalapraya's decorations included:

Star of Mahaputera, 4th Class (13 August 2010)		Guerrilla Star
Army Meritorious Service Star, 3rd Class	Armed Forces Eight Years’ Service Star	Armed Forces Long Service Medal, 2nd Class
Campaign/Battlefield Commemoration Medals I	Campaign/Battlefield Commemoration Medals II	Military Operations Service Medals V
PRRI Military Campaign Medal	West Guinea Military Campaign Medal	Medal for Active Duty as a Border Guard
Medal for Combat Against Communists	Commander of the Most Noble Order of the Crown of Thailand (1970)	Officer of the Order of Orange-Nassau (1970)

In addition to his decorations, Nalapraya received an honorary doctorate from the State University of Jakarta on 22 May 2017.
