= Soekarwo =

Indonesian politician, governor

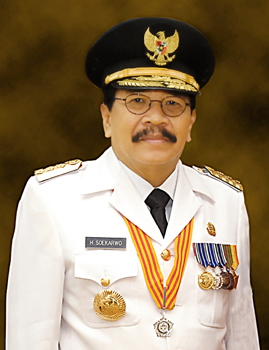
- Official governoratial portrait, 2009

13th Governor of East Java
- In office 12 February 2009 – 12 February 2019
- President: Susilo Bambang Yudhoyono; Joko Widodo
- Deputy: Saifullah Yusuf
- Preceded by: Imam Utomo
- Succeeded by: Khofifah Indar Parawansa

Member of Presidential Advisory Council of the Republic of Indonesia
- Incumbent
- Assumed office 13 December 2019 Serving with List: Wiranto (chairman); Sidarto Danusubroto; Agung Laksono; Tahir; Putri Kuswisnuwardhani; Mardiono Bakar; Arifin Panigoro; Soekarwo
- President: Joko Widodo

Personal details
- Born: 16 June 1950 (age 76) Madiun, East Java, Indonesia
- Party: Golkar
- Other political affiliations: Democratic (until 2023)
- Spouse: Nina Kirana Soekarwo

Soekarwo (born 16 June 1950), popularly known as Uncle Karwo (Javanese: Pakde Karwo), is an Indonesian politician who served as the 13th Governor of East Java from 2009 to 2019. Prior to his tenure as governor he was Regional Secretary of East Java from 2003 to 2008. He was the chair of the Democratic Party in East Java until 2020, and joined the Golkar Party in 2023. He served as the president commissioner of Bank Jatim and SIG.

== Early life and education ==
Soekarwo was born in Madiun, Indonesia, on 16 June 1950. He graduated from Diponegoro University with a Doctor of Philosophy in law in 2004.

== Career ==
Soekarwo became president commissioner of Bank Jatim in 2005, and served until he resigned to become Governor of East Java on 12 February 2009. Soekarwo succeeded Sutiyoso as president commissioner of SIG in 2018, and served until his resignation on 19 June 2020.

Soekarwo was Regional Secretary of East Java from 2003 to 2008, when he stepped down to run for governor. He was elected governor in 2009 and reelected in 2013, as a member of the Democratic Party (PD). Saifullah Yusuf was his Deputy Governor.

During Soekarwo's tenure as governor East Java's exports to Australia rose from $176.92 million to $369.46 million between 2014 and 2018.

Soekarwo was the chair of the PD in East Java until 2020. He joined the Golkar Party in 2023.

After leaving the governorship Soekarwo worked as a lecturer at Airlangga University. Soekarwo was appointed to the Presidential Advisory Council.

== Personal life ==
Soekarwo was known by the nickname Uncle Karwo (Javanese: Pakde Karwo. He is married to Nina Kirana. He is a Muslim.

== Works cited ==
=== News ===
- "Koekarwo Diberhentikan". Kompas. 2 June 2008. Archived from the original on 4 July 2025.
- "Profile Soekarwo, Former Governor Of East Java 2 Periods Back To The Golkar Party". Voice of Indonesia. 5 January 2023. Archived from the original on 4 July 2025.
- "Soekarwo Mundur Dari Komisaris Utama PT SIG". Ngopibareng. 19 June 2020. Archived from the original on 4 July 2025.
- "The Entry Of Ridwan Kamil And Pakde Karwo Into Golkar Is Considered To Shake The Rulers Of Sound In West Java And East Java". Voice of Indonesia. 25 January 2023. Archived from the original on 4 July 2025.
- Baehaqi, A. (11 August 2019). "Emil Dardak Lebih Pantas Gantikan Soekarwo Pimpin Demokrat Jatim". Jatimnet. Archived from the original on 4 July 2025.
- Faiq, Nuraini (5 August 2018). "Pakde Karwo: Kantor Konjen Australia di Surabaya Diharapkan Tingkatkan Perdagangan Jatim - Australia". Tribun Network. Archived from the original on 4 July 2025.
- Sakti, Sofyan (6 March 2019). "Nina Soekarwo Minta Izin Kembali Mengajar Jadi Dosen Unitomo Surabaya, Pakde Karwo Beri Tanggapan". Tribun Network. Archived from the original on 4 July 2025.

=== Web ===
- "Dr. H. Soekarwo S.H., M.Hum". Diponegoro University. 24 December 2024. Archived from the original on 4 July 2025.
- "Laporan Tahunan 2009 Annual Report" (PDF). Bank Jatim. 2009. Archived (PDF) from the original on 4 July 2025.

Political offices
Preceded by Imam Utomo	Governor of East Java; 2009–2019	Succeeded by Khofifah Indar Parawansa
