= Taheri Noor =

Indonesian politician (1937–2023)

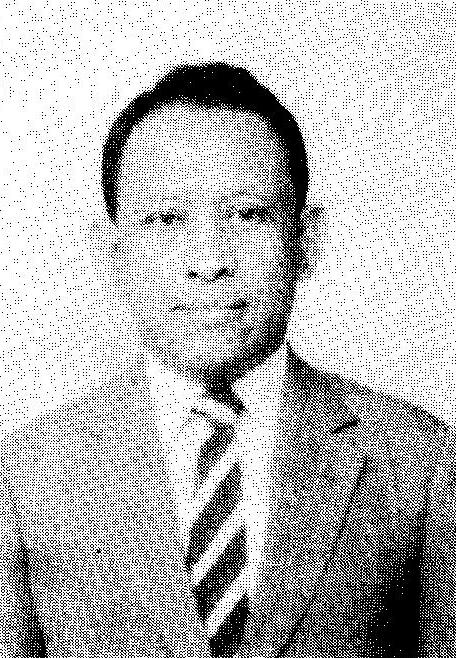
- Official portrait, 1992

Member of the People's Representative Council
- In office 20 October 1990 – 1 October 1997
- President: Suharto; B. J. Habibie
- Preceded by: Riwi Hardanta
- Parliamentary group: Armed Forces
- Constituency: West Kalimantan

Personal details
- Born: 15 August 1937 Pontianak, Dutch East Indies
- Died: 28 April 2023 (aged 85) Jakarta, Indonesia
- Spouse: Popong Rosnani
- Children: 4
- Education: Airlangga University (dr.); University of Indonesia (MA)

Military service
- Allegiance: Indonesia
- Branch/service: Army
- Years of service: 1965–1999
- Rank: Major general

Taheri Noor (15 August 1937 – 28 April 2023) was an Indonesian army general, politician, and physician. He served as a member of the People's Representative Council from 1990 until 1997 and in the National Commission on Human Rights from 2002 until 2007.

== Early life and education ==
Taheri was born in Pontianak on 15 August 1937. He completed his primary education at the Pontianak People's School in 1945, secondary education at the Pontianak Junior High School in 1951 and the 1st Pontianak High School in 1954. He would later chair the association of 1st Pontianak High School graduates in Jakarta.

Upon completing high school, Taheri moved to Java where he enrolled at the Infantry Cadre School (SKI). He completed the school until 1957 and was sent by the army to study medicine at the Airlangga University. He graduated from the university on 23 January 1965.

Taheri attended various courses on international affairs and intelligence during his career in the military. He also pursued postgraduate studies on national resilience in the University of Indonesia and graduated with a Master of Arts in 1989.

== Military career ==
Taheri began his military career in 1965 as a doctor for the Army Health Service. For five years until 1970, he was rotated to various army commands. He was then assigned to the Army Psychological Service (Dinas Psikologi Angkatan Darat, DIPIAD) in 1969 and became the deputy commander of the investigation section in DIPIAD the next year.

Less than a year later, in 1970 he was transferred to the Indonesian Strategic Intelligence Agency (Badan Intelijen Strategis, BAIS) and was appointed to lead the agency's attache bureau. He would head several institutions in the agency, such as the agency's foreign bureau, chemical bureau, and chemical laboratory. Afterwards, he held several high-ranking intelligence positions in the agency before being transferred to the armed forces headquarters in 1984.

During his assignment in BAIS, Taheri was involved in various intelligence activities. In 1980, following anti-Chinese riots in Central Java, Taheri and several other intelligence officers were sent to conduct intelligence operations in the province. He was also involved in activities abroad, with him being sent to Vietnam as an intelligence officer to the Garuda Contingent during the final years of the Vietnam War. Several years later, he was sent to Cambodia to assist the establishment of an Indonesian embassy in the newly formed People's Republic of Kampuchea. His final military assignment overseas was to Namibia in 1989 as part of an UN team of observers.

In 1988, several months prior to the end of Major-General Soedjiman's term as the governor of West Kalimantan, several names were nominated by the local parliament as a possible candidate to replace him. Among these candidates were Taheri Noor, who at that time was still serving in BAIS. However, Taheri's named was removed from the nomination, as he did not "me[e]t the necessary condition applicable" for military officers.

Taheri was promoted to the rank of brigadier general on 1 April 1994, and to major general sometime during his third term.

== Political career ==
Taheri was a member of the People's Representative Council for three periods. He first served as a replacement for Riwi Hardinata, who died in late 1989. After his first term as replacement ended in 1992, he served for another full term.

Throughout his career in the council, Taheri was seated in the Committee for Inter-Parliamentary Cooperation (Badan Kerja Sama Antar Parlemen, BKSAP) and Commission VIII, which handles matters related to health and social services. As a member of BKSAP, Taheri represented the People's Representative Council in various international parliamentary meetings, such as the ASEAN Inter-Parliamentary Assembly General Session in 1991, the International Conference on Population and Development in 1994, the 92nd and 94th IPU Assembly in 1994 and 1996, and the World Summit for Social Development in 1995.

Taheri served as the chairman of the Indonesia-Russia Joint Commission on Economic, Scientific and Technical Cooperation (Grup Kerja Sama Bilateral, GKSB) and as the deputy chairman of the Indonesia-South Korea GKSB. He was also a member of the Human Rights Subcommittee and the Population Subcommittee inside the council.

Upon his retirement from the People's Representative Council in 1997, Taheri briefly became a member of the People's Consultative Assembly until 1999. He was nominated as a member of the National Commission on Human Rights (Komnas HAM) in early 2002, with specialization in political affairs. He was selected and served until 2007. His re-nomination for a second term in Komnas HAM sparked controversy due to the special treatment given to him by the selection committee.

== Personal life ==
Taheri was a devout Muslim. He was married to Popong Rosnani, with whom he has four children.

Taheri died in Jakarta on 28 April 2023. He was interred the next day.
