= Muhammad Madyan =

Rector of Airlangga University

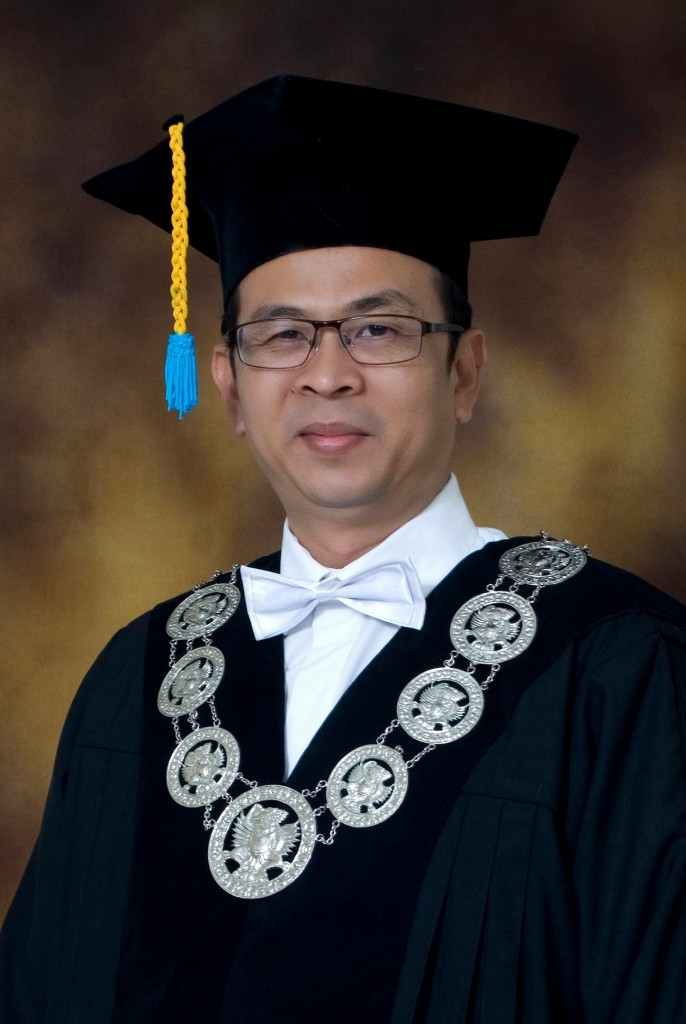

14th Rector of Airlangga University
- Incumbent
- Assumed office 17 Juni 2025
- President: Prabowo Subianto
- Preceded by: Mohammad Nasih

Vice Rector for Human Resources
- In office 5 Agustus 2020 – 17 Juni 2025
- Leader: Mohammad Nasih
- Preceded by: Mohammad Nasih

Personal details
- Born: 4 Januari 1971 Martapura
- Education: Airlangga University; University of Wollongong; Universitas Brawijaya

Muhammad Madyan (born in Martapura, 1971) is an academic and the Rector of Airlangga University for the 2025–2030 term. He previously served as Vice Rector for Human Resources for the 2020–2025 term. He was elected as Rector through a selection process, campus community assessment, and a plenary meeting of the Board of Trustees (Majelis Wali Amanat/MWA) held on May 5, 2025. He was officially inaugurated on Tuesday, June 17, 2025.

== Education ==
Madyan completed his undergraduate studies at the Faculty of Economics and Business (FEB), Airlangga University in 1997. He then pursued his master's degrees at Airlangga University in 2003 and at the University of Wollongong, Australia in 2006. He later earned his doctoral degree in management science from Brawijaya University, Malang in 2013.

== Career ==
Madyan is a lecturer and professor in the field of management and finance at the Faculty of Economics and Business (FEB). In addition to being an academic, he once served as Director of Human Resources at Universitas Airlangga (UNAIR) in 2014. He then served as Director of Finance at UNAIR from 2014 to 2015. Following that, he held the position of Vice Rector for Human Resources for the 2020–2025 term.

In the rector election, Madyan received the highest number of votes. Out of a total of 30 members of the Board of Trustees (Majelis Wali Amanat/MWA), 27 members were present and cast their votes, while the remaining 3 were absent. Of the 27 votes, Madyan received 13 votes, Koko Srimulyo received 9 votes, Dwi Setyawan received 4 votes, and 1 vote was abstained.
