= Governor of East Java =

Elected politician in East Java, Indonesia

- Gubernur Jawa Timur
- Coat of arms of East Java

- Flag of East Java (non-civil)

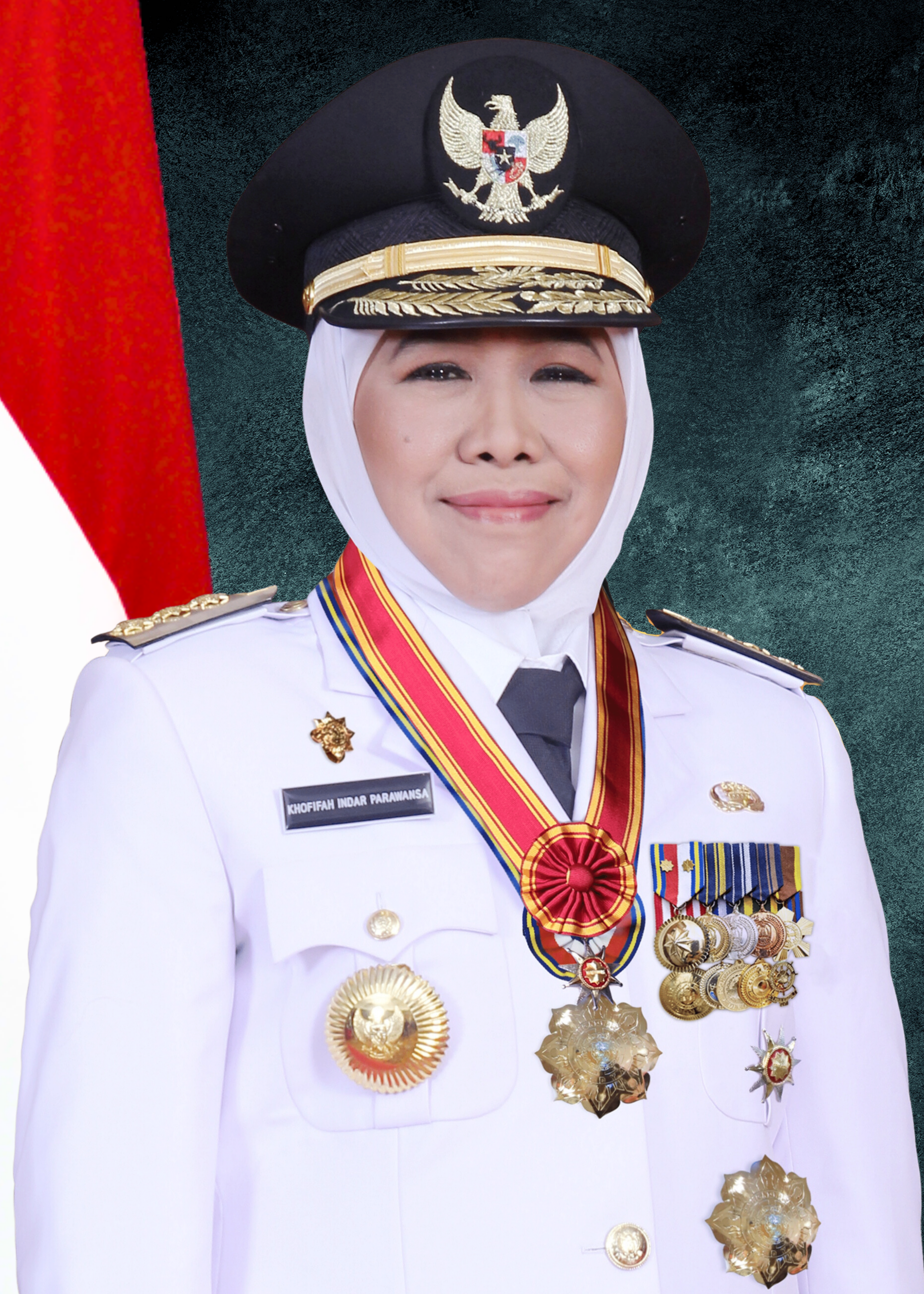
- Incumbent; Khofifah Indar Parawansa since 20 February 2025
- East Java Provincial Government
- Style: Mrs. Governor (informal); The Honorable (formal); Her Excellency (diplomatic)
- Type: Chief executive
- Status: Head of government
- Abbreviation: GOEJ (in English); Gub. Jatim (in Indonesian)
- Residence: Gedung Negara Grahadi, Jalan Gubernur Suryo, Surabaya
- Nominator: Political parties or Independent
- Appointer: Direct popular elections within East Java (Note: since 2008, previously via East Java Regional House of Representatives) or President
- Term length: Five years, renewable once 1 years (specifically for the acting governor)
- Inaugural holder: Ario Soerjo
- Formation: 19 August 1945; 81 years ago
- Deputy: Vice Governor of East Java
- Website: jatimprov.go.id

The Governor of East Java is the head of a level I region who holds the government in East Java together with the Deputy Governor and 120 members of the East Java Regional People's Representative Council as the legislative. The Governor and Deputy Governor of are elected through general elections held every five years, is accountable for the strategic government of the province of East Java.

== Background ==
East Java is a province at the eastern tip of Java Island with its capital in Surabaya. East Java Province has an area of 47,803.49 kilometers and is inhabited by 40.6 million people in 2020. East Java Province is one of the first provinces established after the Proclamation of Indonesian Independence. Since 1945, East Java has been led by 14 governors and two acting governors. The first governor of East Java was Raden Mas Tumenggung Ario Soerjo or known as Governor Suryo. Governor Suryo was killed in the Madiun Affair rebellion in 1948.

== List of governors ==
The following is a list of East Java Governors starting from the Dutch East Indies, until Post-Proclamation. Previously, governors were only appointed by the Ministry of Home Affairs with the approval of the President, then Post-New Order Governors were only able to start general elections in 2008 which were through open Direct Elections.

#	Portrait	Governor	Took office	Left office	Party	Vice Governor	Period	Description
Gouverneurs van Oost-Java
1		M. C. H. Anderman	1928	1931	N/A	—	1	
2		C. H. De Han	1931	1933	N/A	—	2	
3		J. H. B. Kuneman	1933	1936	N/A	—	3	
4		C. H. O. van Der Plas	1936	1941	N/A	—	4	
5		Mr. C. H. Hartevelt	1941	1942	N/A	—	4	
Governor of East Java
1		Ario Soerjo (1898–1948)	19 August 1945	1 June 1945	Independent	Sudirman	1	
2		Murdjani (1905–1956)	1 June 1945	24 December 1949	Parindra	Doel Arnowo	2	
3		Samadikoen (1902–1971)	24 December 1949	4 August 1958	Independent		3	
4		Raden Tumenggung Aria Milono (1896–1993)	4 August 1958	3 December 1959	Independent		4	
5		Soewondo Ranoewidjojo (1905–1992)	3 December 1959	31 January 1963	Military	Mochammad Wijono	5	
6		Mochammad Wijono (?)	31 January 1963	December 1967	Military	Satrio Sastrodiredjo	6	
7		Mohammad Noer (1918–2010)	December 1967	26 January 1976	Military		7	
8		Soenandar Prijosoedarmo (1927–1984)	26 January 1976	26 August 1983	Military	List: M. Soegiono (–1981); Soeparmanto (1981–)	8	
9		Wahono (1925–2004)	26 August 1983	26 August 1988	Military	List: Soeparmanto (1981–); Tri Marjono (1985–)	9	
10		Soelarso (1929–2011)	26 August 1988	26 August 1993	Military		10	
11		Basofi Sudirman (1940–2017)	26 August 1993	23 August 1998	Military	Harwin Wasisto	11	
12		Imam Utomo (b. 1943)	23 August 1998	23 August 2003	Military	Imam Supardi	12	
12		Imam Utomo (b. 1943)	23 August 2003	26 August 2008	Military	Soenarjo	13	
13		Soekarwo (b. 1950)	12 February 2009	12 February 2014	Democratic Party	Saifullah Yusuf	14 (2008)	
13		Soekarwo (b. 1950)	12 February 2014	12 February 2019	Democratic Party	Saifullah Yusuf	15 (2013)	
14		Khofifah Indar Parawansa (b. 1965)	13 February 2019	13 February 2024	National Awakening Party	Emil Dardak	16 (2018)	
14		Khofifah Indar Parawansa (b. 1965)	20 February 2025	Incumbent	National Awakening Party	Emil Dardak	17 (2024)	

=== Acting governor ===
In a stack of governments, a regional head who submits for leave, temporarily resigns, and left office from his position to the central government, then the Minister of Home Affairs prepares his successor who is a bureaucrat in the local government or even a Vice Governor, including when the position of governor is in transition. The following is a list of temporary replacements for the post of Governor of the East Java.

No	Portrait	Name	Took Office	Left Office	Period	Governor
1		Setia Purwaka	26 August 2008	12 February 2009	—	Transition
2		Heru Tjahjono	12 February 2019	13 February 2019	—	Transition
3		Adhy Karyono	13 February 2024	20 February 2025	—	Transition

Legends

Independent
Parindra Party
Military
Democratic Party
National Awakening Party
Gerindra Party
