= Prigi Arisandi =

Indonesian biologist and environmentalist (born 1976)

- Born: January 24, 1976 (age 50); Gresik
- Education: Airlangga University
- Awards: Goldman Environment Prize (2011)

Prigi Arisandi (born January 24, 1976) is an Indonesian biologist and environmentalist.

== Early life and education ==
He graduated in biology from the Airlangga University. He was awarded the Goldman Environmental Prize in 2011, for his efforts on reducing industrial pollution of the Surabaya River.
