= Imam Utomo =

Indonesian politician

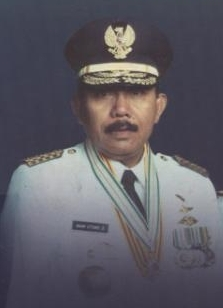

12th Governor of East Java
- In office 1998–2008
- President: Susilo Bambang Yudhoyono; Megawati Sukarnoputri; Abdurrahman Wahid; B.J. Habibie
- Deputy: Imam Supardi (1998–2003); Soenarjo (2003–08)
- Preceded by: Basofi Sudirman
- Succeeded by: Soekarwo

Personal details
- Born: May 14, 1943 (age 82) Jombang, East Java, Dutch East Indies
- Party: Indonesia Democracy Party-Struggle
- Spouse: Hj. Aniek Imam Utomo

H. Imam Utomo S (born 14 May 1943) is a former governor of East Java in Indonesia. He was born in Jombang, East Java, and was governor from 1998 to 2003 and again from 2003 to 2008.
