= Airlangga University =

Public university in Surabaya, Indonesia

- Universitas Airlangga
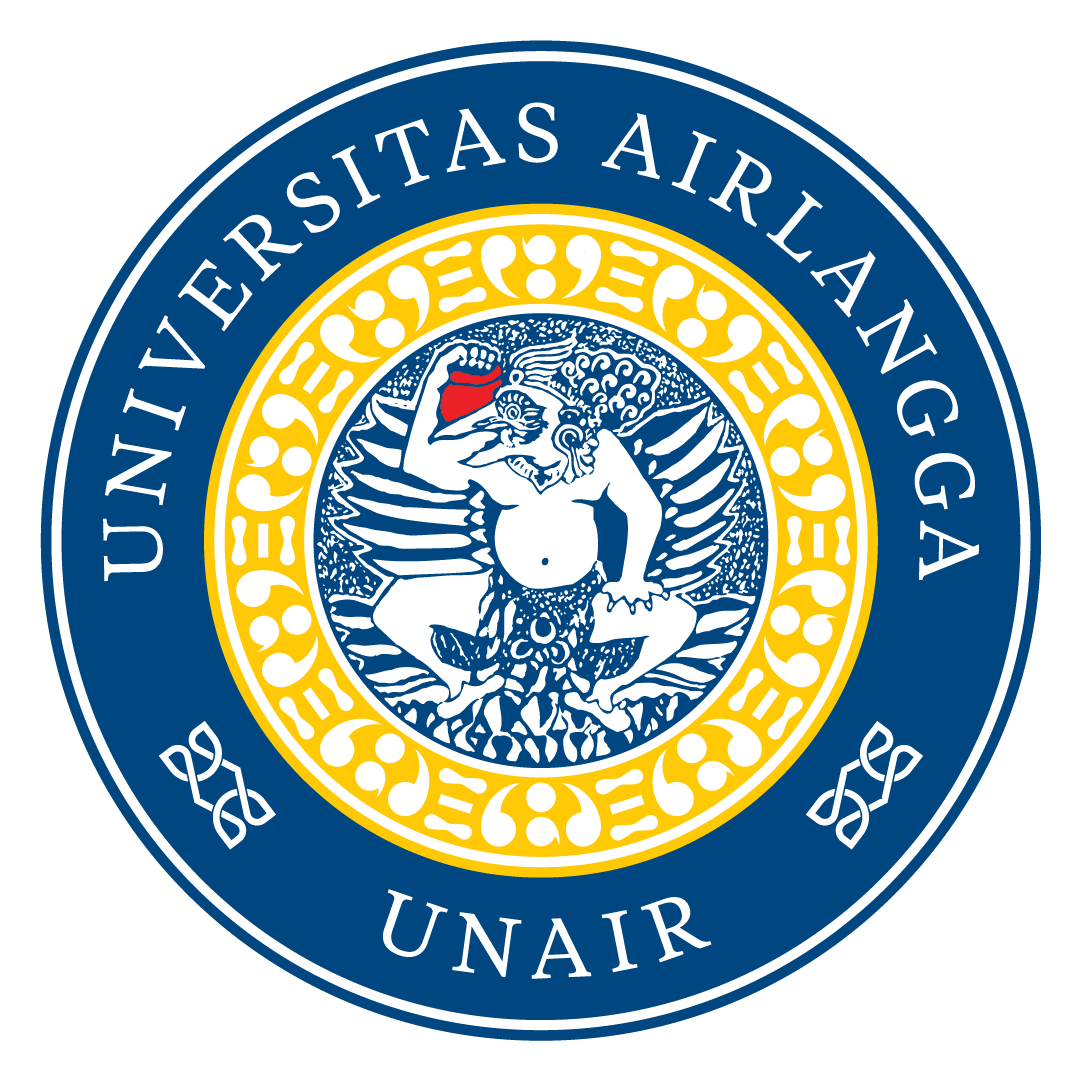
- Seal of UNAIR
- Motto: Excellence with Morality
- Type: Public university
- Established: November 10, 1954; 72 years ago
- Affiliations: ASIC, AUN, ABEST21, ASEA-UNINET, ASIIN, ASAIHL, FIBAA, APHEA, ACEN
- Rector: Prof. Dr. Muhammad Madyan, S.E., M.Si., M.Fin.
- Academic staff: 2,207
- Students: 35,985
- Undergraduates: 33,642
- Postgraduates: 2,343
- Location: Surabaya, East Java, Indonesia; 7°16′18″S 112°45′29″E
- Campus: Urban A Campus B Campus C Campus Banyuwangi Campus
- Student newspaper: UNAIR News
Colours
- Nickname: UNAIR
- Mascot: Garuda Mukti
- Website: www.unair.ac.id (engl.)
- Main campus location

Airlangga University (Indonesian: Universitas Airlangga; Javanese: ꦈꦤꦶꦮ꦳ꦼꦂꦱꦶꦠꦱ꧀ꦄꦲꦶꦂꦭꦁꦒ, abbreviated as UNAIR) is the second-oldest university in Indonesia and also a research public university located in Surabaya, East Java. Despite being officially established by Indonesian Government Regulation in 1954, Universitas Airlangga was first founded in 1948 as a distant branch of the University of Indonesia, with roots dating back to 1913. It started with a medical school and a school of dentistry. Now Universitas Airlangga hosts 16 faculties with more than 35,000 students (during the 2015-2016 academic year) and 1,570 faculty members. Universitas Airlangga has university hospitals for the faculties of Medicine, Veterinary Medicine, Nursing, and Dentistry, as well as a tropical infection hospital for its Institute of Tropical Disease. The university is also equipped with biosafety level three facilities.

Universitas Airlangga has international partnerships worldwide, including with the University of Bonn, Seoul National University, and the University of Adelaide.

== History ==
Before Universitas Airlangga was established on October 11, 1847, the proposal to educate young Javanese to become health experts was submitted to the Dutch colonial government. On May 8, 1913 — through Edict No. 4211 of the Governor General of the Netherlands-Indies — NIAS (Nederlandsch Indische Artsen School) (Netherlands Indies School of Doctors) was founded as a medical education center in Surabaya. The first medical institution was located in Jl. Kedungdoro 38, Surabaya. In 1923, NIAS was moved to its present-day location of the Faculty of Medicine of Universitas Airlangga, on Jl. Major General Moestopo, Surabaya.

Lonkhuizen, the director of the Department of Health, proposed the establishment of a School of Dentistry in Surabaya. He received approval from R.J.F. Van Zaben, the succeeding director of NIAS, and the new school was opened in July 1928. Later on, the school was better known as STOVIT (School tot Opleiding van Indische Tandartsen) (School for Training Indies Dentists) with 21 students. Later during the Japanese occupation, STOVIT was renamed Ika-Shika Daigaku (医科歯科大学) (College of Medicine and Dentistry) under the supervision of Takeda as its first director (1942–1945), while NIAS was closed down.

Two years later, the post-WW II Dutch colonial government took over Ika-Shika Daigaku and then changed its name to Tandheelkundig Instituut (Institute of Dentistry) and NIAS was reopened as Faculteit der Geneeskunde (Faculty of Medicine). In 1948, the dentistry institute changed its status to Universitair Tandheelkundig Instituut (UTI) (Institute of College Dentistry). Later after Republik Indonesia Serikat (RIS) gained its official independence in 1950, UTI was renamed LIKG (Lembaga Ilmu Kedokteran Gigi) (Institute of Dentistry) for four years, under the leadership of Prof. M. Knap and Prof. M. Soetojo. In 1948, both schools became part of the University of Indonesia's Faculty of Medicine and Faculty of Dentistry.

Universitas Airlangga was established by Government Regulation (Peraturan Pemerintah) No. 57/1954 and was inaugurated by the first president of the Republic of Indonesia, Sukarno on November 10, 1954, coinciding with the celebration of the ninth national Heroes' Day. In the same year, the Faculty of Law of Universitas Airlangga (formerly a branch of the Faculty of Law, Economics and Social Politics of Gadjah Mada University, Yogyakarta) was established.

== Namesake and Coat of Arms ==
The flag of Airlangga University.

The name Airlangga is taken from the name of the reigning king of East Java in 1019–1042, Rakai Halu Sri Lokeswara Dharmawangsa Airlangga Anantawikramattungadewa (well known as Prabu Airlangga). Universitas Airlangga's Coat of Arms is the mythical bird Garuda ("Garudamukha") — the magical bird ridden by Vishnu — who carries an urn containing the eternal water "Amerta". This symbol represents Universitas Airlangga as the source of eternal knowledge.

The colors of the flag of Universitas Airlangga are dominated by yellow and blue; yellow symbolizing golden greatness and blue symbolising the depth of the soul of a warrior. These colors are taken from the veil that covered Vishnu's statue at the founding ceremony of Universitas Airlangga by the first president of the Republic of Indonesia on November 10, 1954.

== Campuses ==
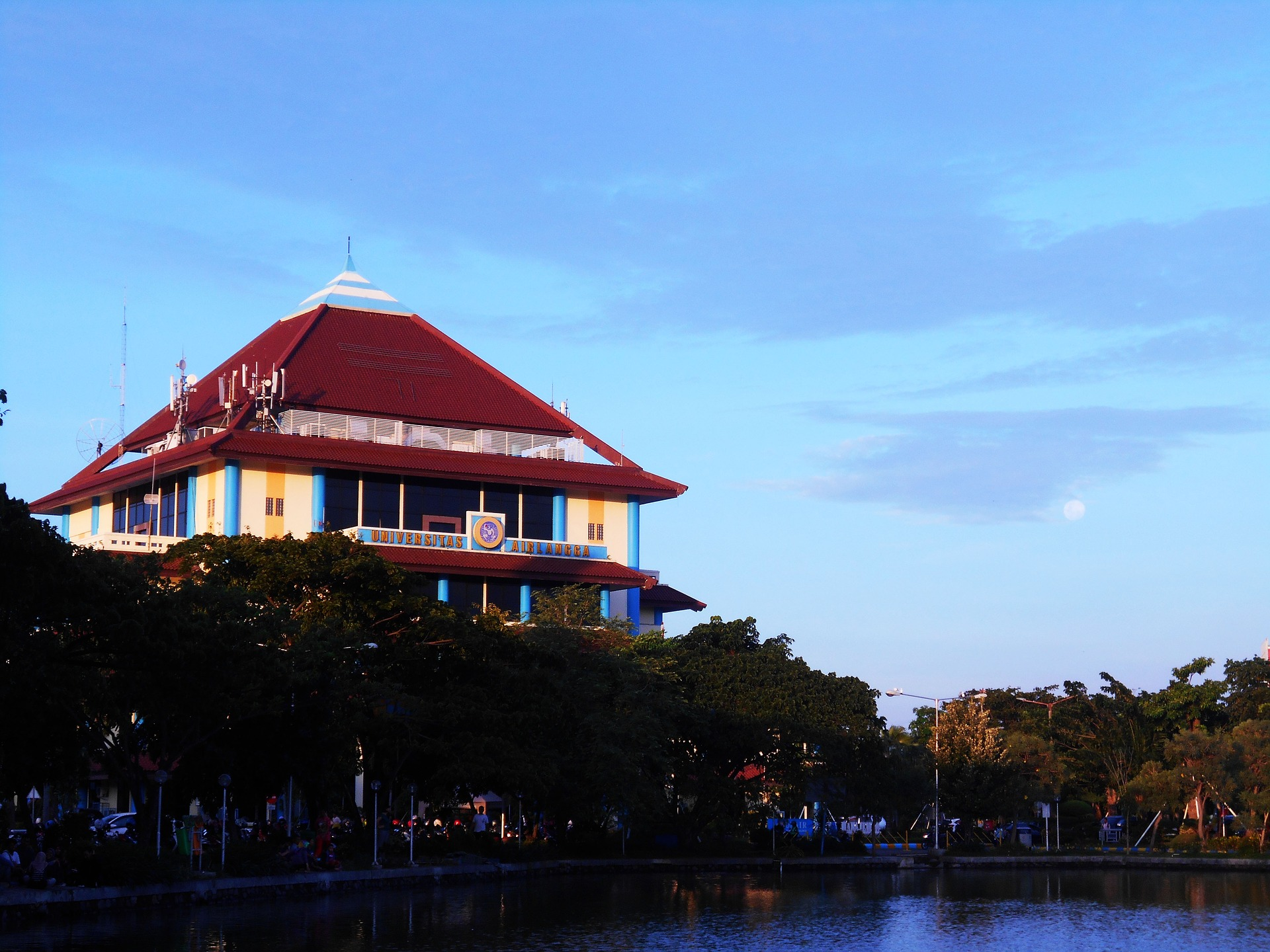
Airlangga University's main entrance.

Universitas Airlangga's faculty campuses are as follows:

- Dharmahusada (A) Campus in Jalan Moestopo (Faculty of Medicine and Faculty of Dentistry).
- Dharmawangsa (B) Campus in Jalan Airlangga (Faculty of Economics and Business, Faculty of Pharmacy, Faculty of Law, Faculty of Social and Political Science, Faculty of Psychology, Faculty of Humanities, and Postgraduate School) with Faculty of Vocational Studies in Jalan Srikana.
- MERR (C) Campus in Jalan Ir. H. Soekarno, Mulyorejo (Faculty of Veterinary Medicine, Faculty of Public Health, Faculty of Sciences and Technology, Faculty of Marine and Fishery, Faculty of Advanced Technology and Multidisciplinary, and Faculty of Nursing).
- Giri Campus, Banyuwangi (an outside regional campus for Aquaculture, Medicine, Veterinary Medicine, and Public Health majors).

== Faculties ==
There are 16 faculties in Universitas Airlangga (including postgraduate school and School of Advanced Technology and Multidisciplinary) and 132 study programs offered:

- Faculty of Medicine
- Faculty of Dentistry
- Faculty of Law
- Faculty of Economics and Business
- Faculty of Pharmacy
- Faculty of Veterinary Medicine
- Faculty of Social and Political Sciences
- Faculty of Science and Technology
- Faculty of Psychology
- Faculty of Public Health
- Faculty of Humanities
- Faculty of Fisheries and Marine
- Faculty of Nursing
- Faculty of Vocational Studies
- Postgraduate School
- Faculty of Advanced Technology and Multidiscipline

== Rankings ==
University rankings

Global – Overall
- QS World: =287 (2026)
- QS Employability: 301-500 (2022)

Regional – Overall
- QS Asia: 52 (2025)

The QS Asia University Rangkings 2024 has ranks Universitas Airlangga as number 67. The QS Asian University Ranking 2014 placed Universitas Airlangga as the best university in the "Citations per paper" category. In 2010, Universitas Airlangga was ranked 466th worldwide according to the Top 500 QS World University Rankings 2010, as well as ranked 86th in the Top 200 QS Asian University Rankings 2011 (third in Indonesia after the University of Indonesia and Gadjah Mada University). In the Webometrics Ranking of World Universities 2011, Universitas Airlangga was placed fourth in Indonesia and 22nd in the Southeast Asia region.

Universitas Airlangga has two internationally standardized quality management certificates. For this reason, Universitas Airlangga has been the destination for foreign students who choose to study in Indonesia, particularly from Malaysia, Japan, Timor Leste, China, Thailand, and some European and African countries.

The Faculty of Medicine and Faculty of Pharmacy are among the best life science schools in Indonesia, ranked 45th in Asia and 356th in the world by QS World University Rankings 2011. The Faculty of Medicine is affiliated with the Dr. Soetomo Regional General Hospital, the biggest hospital in Eastern Indonesia and one of the central referral hospitals in the country.

=== Subject ===
QS World University Rankings by Subject 2026

World rank	Subject
51 – 100	Dentistry; Veterinary Science
101 – 150	Antrophology
151 – 200	▲ Economics & Econometrics; Law; ▼ Accounting & Finance
201 – 250	English Languages & Literature
251 – 300	▲ Sociology; Modern Languages; Pharmacy & Pharmacology; Politics & International Studies
301 – 350	▼ Business & Management Studies
351 – 400	▼ Medicine; Agriculture & Forestry
401 – 450	Chemical Engineering
451 – 500	▲ Chemistry
501 – 550	Mathematics
551 – 600	Biological Sciences
601 – 650	Physics & Astronomy
651 – 700	▲ Computer Science and Information Systems
701 – 750	

QS by Clusters (2026)
Subject	Global	National
Arts & Humanities	▲363	▼4
Engineering and Technology	▲401-450	5
Life Sciences & Medicine	▲326	2
Natural Sciences	-	-
Social Sciences & Management	▲246	3

THE World University Rankings by Subject 2026
Subject	Global	National
Arts & humanities	-	-
Business & economics	601-800	▲4
Computer science	801-1000	▲6
Engineering	1001-1250	▲6
Law	▲301-400	▼6
Life sciences	801-1000	4
Medical & Health	601-800	▼3
Physical sciences	▲1001-1250	▲6
Psychology	▼601+	2
Social sciences	601-800	▲3

== Notable alumni ==
Political Leaders

- Taheri Noor, a former member of the People's Representative Council (1990-1997)
- Anas Urbaningrum, former Member of House of Representative and Head of Democratic Fraction 2009-2014 (resigned in 2010).
- Ignasius Jonan, former director of PT. Kereta Api Indonesia and current Minister of Energy and Mineral Resources of Indonesia.
- Khofifah Indar Parawansa, former Minister of Social Affairs of Indonesia, and current Governor of East Java.
- Soekarwo, former Governor of East Java.
- Tarmizi Taher, former Minister of Religious Affairs of Indonesia in 1993-1998.
- Yahya Zaini, former Member of Parliament in the People's Representative Council.
- Abdul Kadir Jailani, Ambassador of the Republic of Indonesia to Germany.
- Agus Harimurti Yudhoyono, Coordinating Minister for Infrastructure and Regional Development
- Muhammad Hatta Ali, former Chief Justice of the Supreme Court of Indonesia.
- Sunarto (judge), Chief Justice of the Supreme Court of Indonesia.

Award Winners

- Raden Roro Ayu Maulida Putri, model, Indonesian People’s Consultative Assembly Ambassador, Indonesian COVID-19 Response Acceleration Task Force speaker, Winner of Face of Asia 2019, Puteri Indonesia 2020, and Miss Universe Indonesia 2020.
- Elvira Devinamira Wirayanti, actress, model, Puteri Indonesia 2014, then the Top-15 and winner of Best National Costume in the Miss Universe 2014.

Artists

- Padi (band), Indonesian music band, all of its members studied at Universitas Airlangga.

Social Activists

- Erni Suyanti Musabine, veterinarian involved in the conservation of Sumatran tigers
- Prigi Arisandi, 2011 Goldman Environmental Prize awardee.
- Lo Siaw Ging, doctor from Surakarta who provided free medical treatment to the poor for 50 years
