= 2005 Kutai Kartanegara regency election =

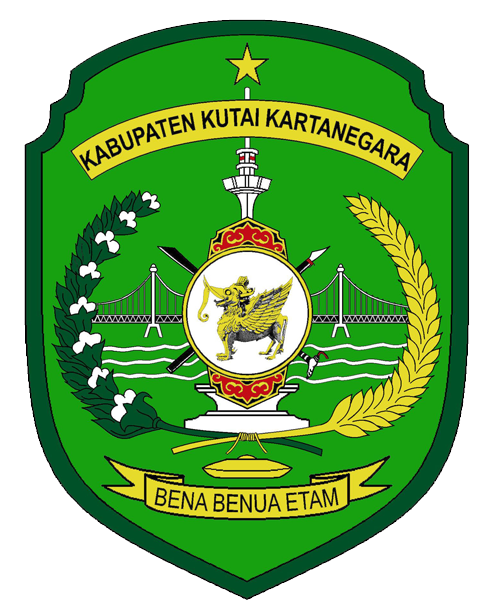
- 1 June 2005
- Registered: 375,925
- Turnout: 70.67%
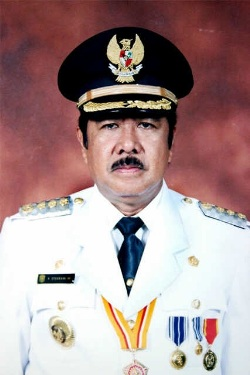

Candidate	Syaukani Hasan Rais	Aji Sofyan Alex	Tajuddin Noor
Party	Golkar	PKS	Patriot
Running mate	Samsuri Aspar	M. Irkham	Abdul Djebar Bukran
Popular vote	159,303	88,625	13,862
Percentage	60.85%	33.85%	5.30%
Regent before election
Syaukani Hasan Rais
Golkar
Regent after election
Syaukani Hasan Rais
Golkar

Local elections were held on 1 June 2005 to elect the regent and vice-regent of Kutai Kartanegara Regency in the Indonesian province of East Kalimantan. The election was the first ever direct local election in the country following the fall of Suharto.

Incumbent Syaukani Hasan Rais, affiliated with Suharto's Golkar Party, participated in the direct elections and secured over 60 percent of total votes, comfortably gaining his second term. In total, three pairs of candidates contested the elections and over 265,000 of the regency's residents voted.

== Background ==
Indonesia's Law No. 32 of 2004 on regional administration mandates the holding of local elections for its provinces and regencies/cities. It also gives rights to local electoral commissions (Komisi Pemilihan Umum Daerah) to hold them. Prior to this, elections were held indirectly with governors, mayors and regents being elected in a vote by local councils.

== Overview ==
Registered candidates were verified and officially declared on 26 April 2005. Kutai Kartanegara's electoral commission set a rotating campaign schedule between 15 and 28 May, dividing the regency into 3 sections in each candidate pairs spends one-thirds of the allotted time in before moving into the next section.

The budget for the elections was set at Rp 19 billion (~USD 2 million). According to the electoral commission, difficult geographical conditions highly affected the cost of logistics. In total, there were over 375,000 eligible voters voting in 1,397 polling stations across 212 villages in the regency's 18 subdistricts.

A quick count was released by Pokja 30, a local organization, supported by the US-based National Democratic Institute. Votes had to be retaken in one of the polling stations. Multiple NGOs observed irregularities with the elections, including fictional/duplicate voters, inflated voter lists, vote buying and intimidation, with Pokja 30 alone reporting at least 30 such cases.

== Candidates ==
#	Candidate	Running mate	Parties
1	Aji Sofyan Alex	M. Irkham	PKS, PAN
2	Tajuddin Noor	Abdul Djebar Bukran	Patriot, PPP, Merdeka
3	Syaukani Hasan Rais	Samsuri Aspar	Golkar

Syaukani Hasan Rais was the incumbent and first leader of the regency, although his term expired in December 2004 and his post was occupied by an acting regent from the Ministry of Home Affairs. He was accused of corruption in 2001, but the allegations were dropped following his victory in the election. Having served two terms as Golkar's cadre in his post, he received strong support from the party.

== Results ==
No	Candidate - Running mate	Votes	%
1	Sofyan-Irkham	88,625	33.85%
2	Tajuddin-Abdul	13,862	5.30%
3	Syaukani-Samsuri	159,303	60.85%
Valid votes		261,790	98.53%
Invalid votes		3,894	1.47%
Turnout		265,684	70.67%
Eligible voters		375,925	

=== By district ===
City/Regency	Sofyan–Irkham		Tajuddin–Abdul		Syaukani–Samsuri		Valid		Invalid		Total votes
City/Regency	Votes	%	Votes	%	Votes	%	Votes	%	Voters	%	Total votes
Anggana	3,316	28.14	969	8.22	7,501	63.64	11,786	98.86	136	1.14	11,922
Kembang Janggut	2,877	33.95	312	3.68	5,286	62.37	8,475	98.03	170	1.97	8,645
Kenohan	1,917	36.16	240	4.53	3,144	59.31	5,301	98.46	83	1.54	5,384
Kota Bangun	5,784	40.64	977	6.86	7,472	52.50	14,233	98.53	212	1.47	14,445
Loa Janan	6,807	28.75	1,341	5.66	15,525	65.58	23,673	98.45	373	1.55	24,046
Loa Kulu	5,698	30.78	900	4.86	11,912	64.35	18,510	98.08	362	1.92	18,872
Marang Kayu	4,417	41.91	421	3.99	5,701	54.09	10,539	98.96	111	1.04	10,650
Muara Badak	5,742	35.27	1,726	10.60	8,814	54.13	16,282	98.99	166	1.01	16,448
Muara Jawa	6,736	59.91	355	3.16	4,152	36.93	11,243	98.75	142	1.25	11,385
Muara Kaman	3,978	28.75	1,064	7.69	8,795	63.56	13,837	98.60	196	1.40	14,033
Muara Muntai	3,046	38.22	398	4.99	4,526	56.79	7,970	98.88	90	1.12	8,060
Muara Wis	1,871	47.95	368	9.43	1,663	42.62	3,902	98.39	64	1.61	3,966
Samboja	7,758	35.36	939	4.28	13,244	60.36	21,941	98.56	321	1.44	22,262
Sanga-Sanga	1,523	27.01	183	3.25	3,933	69.75	5,639	98.14	107	1.86	5,746
Sebulu	5,143	32.31	1,150	7.23	9,623	60.46	15,916	98.09	310	1.91	16,226
Tabang	1,394	30.06	160	3.45	3,083	66.49	4,637	98.87	53	1.13	4,690
Tenggarong	13,700	32.18	1,295	3.04	27,572	64.77	42,567	98.65	584	1.35	43,151
Tenggarong Seberang	6,918	27.30	1,064	4.20	17,357	68.50	25,339	98.39	414	1.61	25,753
Total	88,625	33.85	13,862	5.30	159,303	60.85	261,790	98.53	3,894	1.47	265,684
