= 2005–2014 local elections in Indonesia =

Direct local elections (Indonesian: Pemilihan Kepala Daerah) were held unsimultaneously throughout Indonesia to elect governors, mayor, and regents between 2005 and 2014. In total, nearly 1,000 such elections were held within a nine-year period. Prior to 2005, local executive offices were elected by vote of members of the local Regional House of Representatives.

== Summary ==
During the Suharto presidency, executive officials including the President of Indonesia and regional leaders were elected by members of legislatures. For regional leaders, this amounted to a vote by the relevant Regional House of Representatives (DPRD). In practice, due to the dominance of the ruling party Golkar, regional leaders were effectively central government appointees. After the fall of Suharto, the national House of Representatives passed a law in 2004 which mandated direct elections of local leaders. The law also set that election dates for the regional leaders would be set by the respective regions, with terms of leaders expiring in December 2004 – April 2005 being extended to May 2005.

In order for the local elections to not interfere with the 2009 Indonesian legislative election, no local elections were held in 2009. In 2014, the gubernatorial election for Lampung province was held simultaneously with the 2014 Indonesian legislative election, delayed from its initial schedule of 2013. The separate elections were criticized for their high cost – in 2010, a regency/city election typically cost the government around Rp 10 billion while a provincial election cost around Rp 70 billion. The total expense of the elections in 2010 nationally was comparable to the total available funding for the Ministry of Social Affairs. The high cost for the candidates were also blamed for increasing corruption, with over 170 local leaders being arrested or investigated for corruption in 2004 to 2012.

Nearly 1,000 local elections were held between 2005 and 2013, averaging around one election every three days. Afterwards, in 2015, 2017, 2018, and 2020, all local elections in the same year are held simultaneously nationwide and, starting in 2024, all local elections nationwide are held simultaneously. Prior to this, some provinces had already synchronized their gubernatorial and city/regency elections, such as Aceh in 2012.

== Elections ==
Year	Provincial	Regency/City	Total
2005	7	189	196
2006	4	68	72
2007	4	37	41
2008	13	140	153
2009	No local elections were held in 2009		
2010	7	167	174
2011	5	110	115
2012	5	72	77
2013	14	135	149
2014	1	0	1
Total	60	918	978

== Notable elections ==
=== Gubernatorial ===
- 2006 Acehnese gubernatorial election – first Acehnese election after the end of the insurgency in Aceh
- 2007 Jakarta gubernatorial election
- 2012 Acehnese gubernatorial election
- 2012 Jakarta gubernatorial election
- 2013 South Sulawesi gubernatorial election
- 2013 Central Java gubernatorial election
- 2014 Lampung gubernatorial election – held together with the 2014 Indonesian legislative election due to delays

=== Mayoral/Regency ===
- 2005 Kutai Kartanegara regency election – first direct local election on 1 June 2005
- 2005 Surakarta mayoral election – first election for future president Joko Widodo
- 2008 Bandung mayoral election
- 2010 Surakarta mayoral election
- 2013 Bandung mayoral election
- 2013 Makassar mayoral election
