= Sampang (town) =

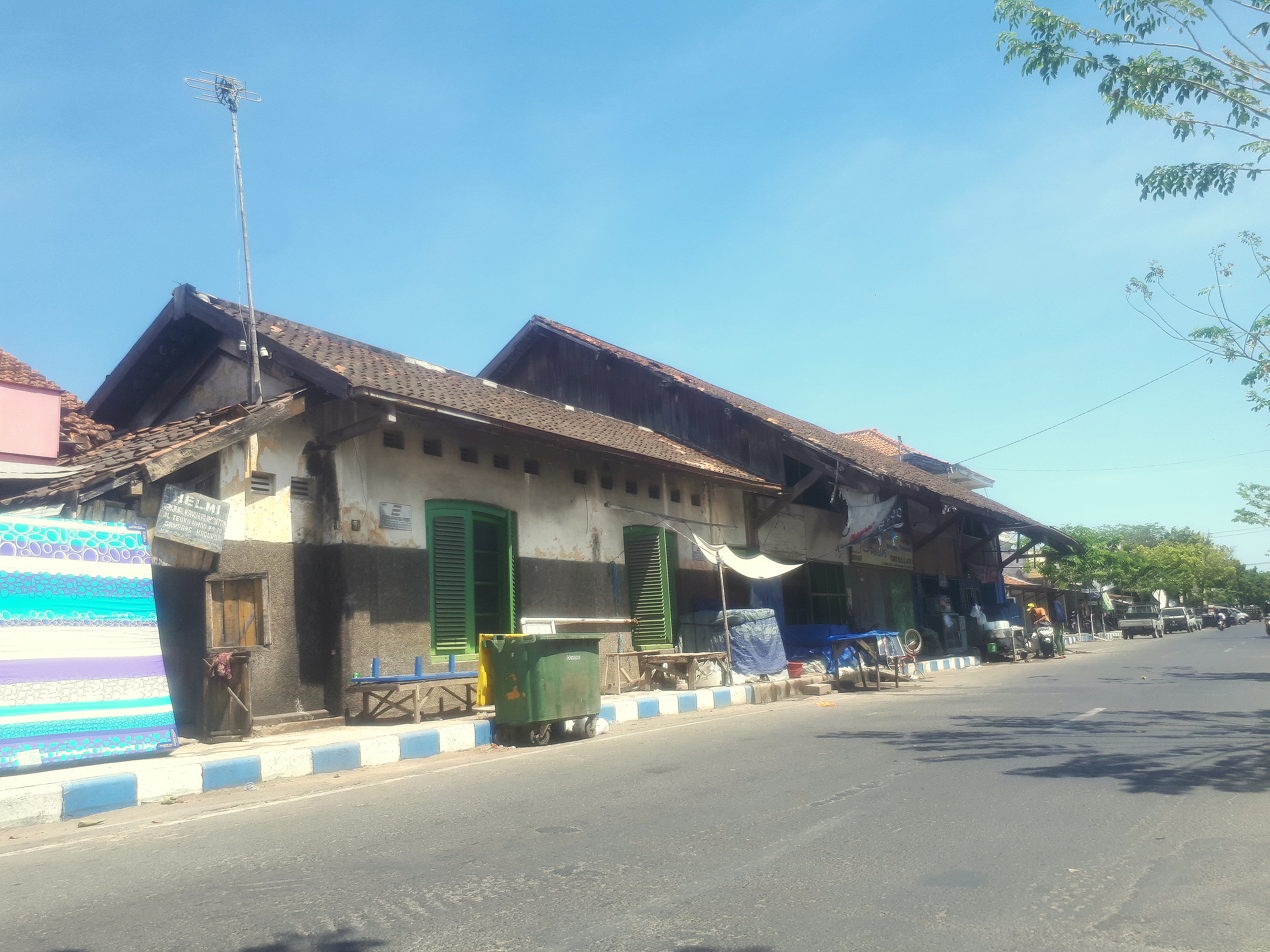

- Location in East Java and Indonesia Sampang (Indonesia)
- Coordinates: 7°11′44.2″S 113°15′4″E
- Country: Indonesia
- Province: East Java
- Regency: Sampang Regency
- District: Sampang District

Area
  - Total: 28.68 sq mi (74.28 km^{2})
- Elevation: 16 ft (5 m)

Population (mid 2025 estimate)
  - Total: 136,670
  - Density: 4,765/sq mi (1,840/km^{2})
- Time zone: UTC+7 (Indonesia Western Standard Time)

Sampang (Madurese pronunciation: [sam.paŋ]) is a town, district and the regency seat of Sampang Regency, in the East Java Province of Indonesia. It is located on the south coast of Madura Island. Its population was 124,390 at the 2020 Census, and the official estimate as at mid 2025 was 136,670.

== Climate ==
Sampang has a tropical savanna climate (Köppen Aw) with moderate to little rainfall from June to November and heavy rainfall from December to May.

Climate data for Sampang
Month	Jan	Feb	Mar	Apr	May	Jun	Jul	Aug	Sep	Oct	Nov	Dec	Year
Mean daily maximum °C (°F)	31.0 (87.8)	31.1 (88.0)	31.3 (88.3)	31.7 (89.1)	31.8 (89.2)	31.6 (88.9)	31.3 (88.3)	31.8 (89.2)	32.4 (90.3)	33.1 (91.6)	33.1 (91.6)	31.7 (89.1)	31.8 (89.3)
Daily mean °C (°F)	26.8 (80.2)	26.9 (80.4)	27.0 (80.6)	27.2 (81.0)	27.2 (81.0)	26.7 (80.1)	26.2 (79.2)	26.5 (79.7)	27.0 (80.6)	27.9 (82.2)	28.1 (82.6)	27.2 (81.0)	27.1 (80.7)
Mean daily minimum °C (°F)	22.7 (72.9)	22.7 (72.9)	22.7 (72.9)	22.8 (73.0)	22.6 (72.7)	21.8 (71.2)	21.1 (70.0)	21.2 (70.2)	21.7 (71.1)	22.7 (72.9)	23.2 (73.8)	22.8 (73.0)	22.3 (72.2)
Average rainfall mm (inches)	202 (8.0)	188 (7.4)	211 (8.3)	155 (6.1)	133 (5.2)	49 (1.9)	42 (1.7)	16 (0.6)	18 (0.7)	49 (1.9)	113 (4.4)	239 (9.4)	1,415 (55.6)
Source: Climate-Data.org
