= Sampang Regency =

Regency in East Java, Indonesia

Sampang Regency Kabupaten Sampang
- Regency

Regional transcription(s)
  - Madurese: Sampang (Latèn) سامڤاڠ (Pèghu) ꦯꦩ꧀ꦥꦁ (Carakan)
  - Javanese: Sêmpang (Gêdrig) سۤمڤاڠ (Pégon) ꦱꦼꦩ꧀ꦥꦁ (Hånåcåråkå)
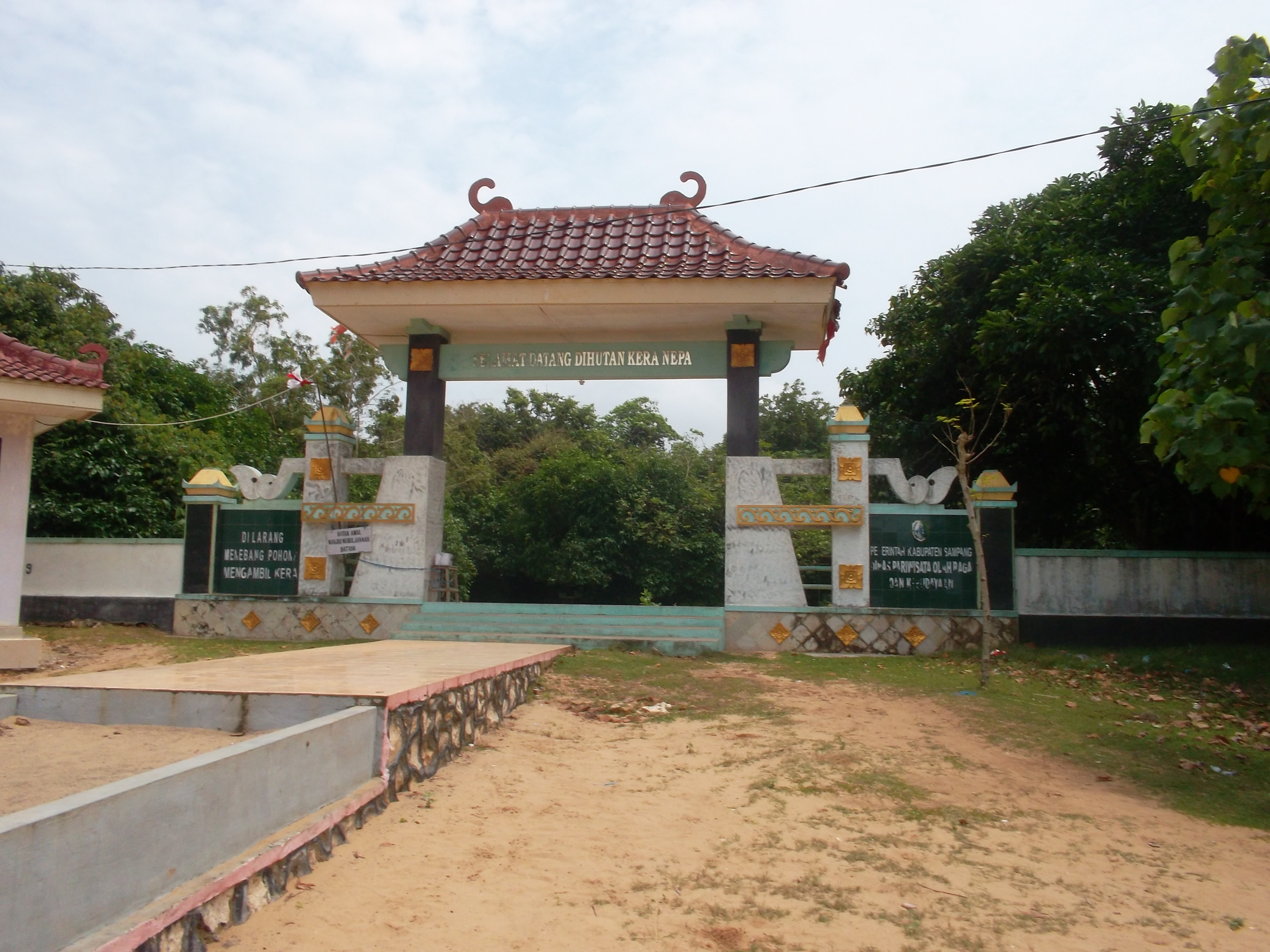
- Banyuates Nepa Forest

- Coat of arms
- Motto: Sampang Hebat Bermartabat
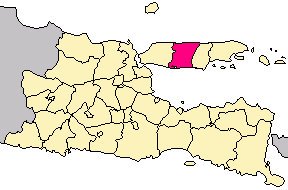
- Location within East Java

- Location in Java and Indonesia Sampang Regency (Indonesia)
- Coordinates: 7.0500°S 113.2500°E
- Country: Indonesia
- Province: East Java
- Capital: Sampang

Government
  - Regent: Slamet Junaidi
  - Vice Regent: Ahmad Mahfudz

Area
  - Total: 1,228.25 km^{2} (474.23 sq mi)
- Highest elevation: 1,244 m (4,081 ft)
- Lowest elevation: 0 m (0 ft)

Population (mid 2025 estimate)
  - Total: 1,046,574
  - Density: 852.085/km^{2} (2,206.89/sq mi)
- Time zone: UTC+7 (IWST)
- Area code: (+62) 323
- Website: sampangkab.go.id

Sampang Regency (Madurese: Kabhupatèn Sâmpang) is a regency (Indonesian: kabupaten) of East Java province, Indonesia. It is situated on Madura Island, bordering on Pamekasan Regency to the east, the Java Sea to the north, Bangkalan Regency to the west, and Madura Strait to the south. It covers an area of 1,228.25 km^{2}, and had a population of at the 2010 census of 877,772 and at the 2020 census of 969,694; the official estimate as at mid 2025 was 1,046,574. The administrative centre is the port of Sampang, on the south coast of Madura.

== Administrative districts ==
Sampang Regency consists of fourteen districts (Indonesian: kecamatan), tabulated below with their areas and their populations at the 2010 census and the 2020 census, together with the official estimates as at mid 2025. For convenience these are grouped into southern and northern geographical sectors (which have no administrative identity). The table also includes the locations of the district administrative centres, the number of administrative villages in each district (totaling 180 rural desa and 6 urban kelurahan - the latter all in Sampang District), and its postcode.

Kode Wilayah	Name of District (kecamatan)	Area in km^{2}	Pop'n 2010 census	Pop'n 2020 census	Pop'n mid 2025 estimate	Admin centre	No. of villages	Post code
35.27.01	Sreseh	70.11	28,613	32,869	37,823	Labuhan	12	69273
35.27.02	Torjun	46.67	36,282	40,153	43,880	Torjun	12	69270
35.27.13	Pangarengan	43.20	21,120	24,235	27,984	Apaan	6	69271
35.27.03	Sampang ^{(a)} (town)	74.28	114,983	124,390	136,670	Tanggumong	18 ^{(b)}	69212 -69216
35.27.04	Camplong	70.33	86,380	84,556	92,658	Tambaan	14	69281
35.27.05	Omben	104.99	77,204	86,800	92,418	Rapa Laok	20	69261
35.27.06	Kedungdung	119.52	86,622	96,049	99,009	Moktesareh	18	69252
35.27.07	Jrengik	67.16	31,657	36,656	40,370	Kotah	14	69272
35.27.08	Tambelangan	84.90	48,395	55,472	57,711	Samaran	10	69253
Sub-totals	Southern sector	681.28	531,256	581,180	629,979		124	
35.27.09	Banyuates	148.80	74,282	84,979	89,180	Banyuates	20	69263
35.27.10	Robatal	83.74	53,051	58,814	60,511	Robatal	9	69255
35.27.14	Karang Penang	76.80	66,639	80,944	81,635	Karangpenang Onjur	7	69254
35.27.12	Ketapang ^{(c)}	129.70	88,252	89,616	99,816	Ketapang Barat	14	69261
35.27.11	Sokobanah	107.93	64,292	74,161	85,453	Tamberuh Barat	12	69262
Sub-totals	Northern sector	546.97	346,516	388,514	416,595		62	
Totals	for Regency	1,228.25	877,772	969,694	1,046,574	Sampang	186	

Note: (a) Sampang District includes the small island of Pulau Mandangin, off the south coast of Madura.
(b) comprises 6 kelurahan (Banyuanyar, Dalpenang, Gunung Sekar, Karang Dalem, Polagan and Rong Tengah) and 12 desa.
(c) Ketapang, a port on the north coast of Madura, is not to be confused with Ketapang in West Kalimantan; it serves as a vital coastal gateway on the northern shore of Madura Island, a region characterized by its dramatic limestone landscapes, arid rolling hills, and expansive views of the Java Sea. It includes the villages (desa) of Ketapang Timur (with 9,009 population in mid 2024), Ketapang Daya (11,666), Ketapang Laok (9,925) and Ketapang Barat (9,273), for a total of 39,873 inhabitants in 38.44 km^{2}.
