= List of regencies and cities in East Java =

The Indonesian province of East Java comprises the following 29 regencies (kabupaten) and 9 cities (kota, previously kotamadya and kota pradja).

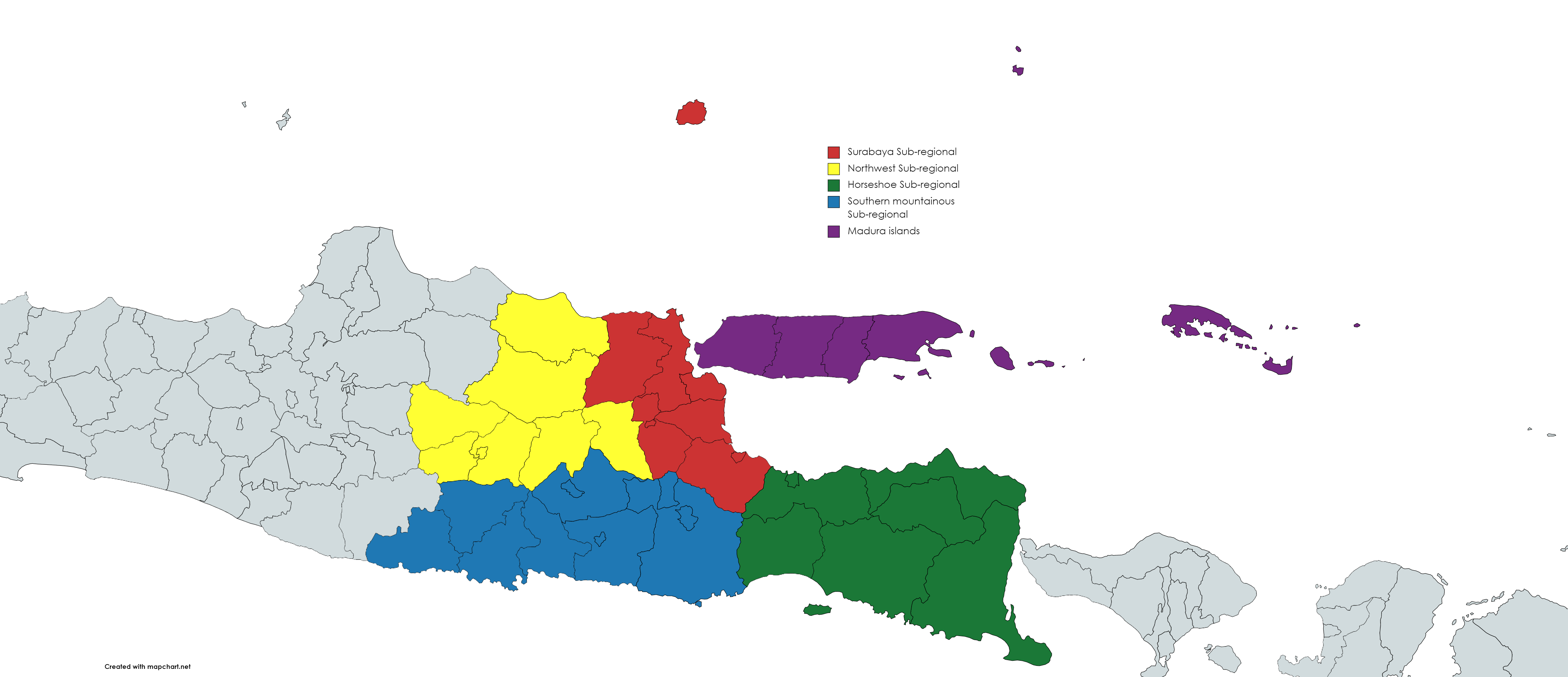
Sub-region of East Java

Region Code	Name of City or Regency	Seat	Area (km^{2})	Pop'n 2000 Census	Pop'n 2010 Census	Pop'n 2020 Census	Pop'n mid 2024 Estimate	HDI 2014 estimate
35.01	Pacitan Regency	Pacitan	1,433.59	525,758	540,881	586,110	588,569	0.638 (Medium)
35.02	Ponorogo Regency	Ponorogo	1,418.62	841,449	855,281	949,318	962,941	0.674 (Medium)
35.03	Trenggalek Regency	Trenggalek	1,249.23	649,883	674,411	731,125	744,516	0.661 (Medium)
35.04	Tulungagung Regency	Tulungagung	1,144.53	929,833	990,158	1,089,775	1,113,847	0.694 (Medium)
35.05	Blitar Regency	Kanigoro	1,745.16	1,064,643	1,116,639	1,223,745	1,263,645	0.668 (Medium)
35.72	Blitar City		33.20	119,372	131,968	149,149	154,867	0.752 (High)
35.06	Kediri Regency	Ngasem	1,523.56	1,408,353	1,499,768	1,635,294	1,689,916	0.684 (Medium)
35.71	Kediri City		67.23	244,519	268,507	286,796	298,227	0.746 (High)
35.07	Malang Regency	Kepanjen	3,473.44	2,412,570	2,446,218	2,654,448	2,735,993	0.655 (Medium)
35.73	Malang City		111.08	756,982	820,243	843,810	872,694	0.789 (High)
35.79	Batu City		194.17	^{(a)}	190,184	213,046	222,685	0.718 (High)
	Southern region totals		12,393.81	8,953,362	9,534,258	10,362,616	10,647,900	
35.08	Lumajang Regency	Lumajang	1,797.10	965,192	1,006,458	1,119,251	1,145,849	0.623 (Medium)
35.09	Jember Regency	Jember	3,313.46	2,187,657	2,332,726	2,536,729	2,603,817	0.626 (Medium)
35.10	Banyuwangi Regency	Banyuwangi	3,592.90	1,488,791	1,556,078	1,708,114	1,754,393	0.673 (Medium)
35.11	Bondowoso Regency	Bondowoso	1,554.99	688,651	736,772	776,151	792,309	0.634 (Medium)
35.12	Situbondo Regency	Situbondo	1,653.72	603,705	647,619	685,967	700,719	0.639 (Medium)
35.13	Probolinggo Regency	Kraksaan	1,724.51	1,004,967	1,096,244	1,152,537	1,185,242	0.630 (Medium)
35.74	Probolinggo City		54.68	191,522	217,062	239,649	249,539	0.704 (High)
	Tapal Kuda ("horseshoe")/ Eastern region totals		13,691.36	7,130,485	7,592,959	8,218,398	8,431,868	
35.78	Surabaya City		350.6	2,599,796	2,765,487	2,874,314	2,921,996	0.788 (High)
35.25	Gresik Regency (includes Bawean Island)	Gresik	1,256.36	1,005,445	1,177,042	1,311,215	1,364,019	0.728 (High)
35.24	Lamongan Regency	Lamongan	1,752.71	1,181,660	1,179,059	1,344,165	1,378,147	0.694 (Medium)
35.16	Mojokerto Regency	Mojosari	984.64	908,004	1,025,443	1,119,209	1,154,257	0.702 (High)
35.76	Mojokerto City		20.22	108,938	120,196	132,434	137,393	0.750 (High)
35.14	Pasuruan Regency	Bangil	1,493.29	1,366,605	1,512,468	1,605,969	1,657,216	0.643 (Medium)
35.75	Pasuruan City		39.00	168,323	186,262	208,006	219,392	0.732 (High)
35.15	Sidoarjo Regency	Sidoarjo	724.04	1,563,015	1,941,497	2,082,801	2,171,480	0.767 (High)
	Surabaya region totals		6,606.19	8,901,786	9,907,454	10,678,224	11,003,900	
35.22	Bojonegoro Regency	Bojonegoro	2,312.63	1,165,401	1,209,973	1,301,635	1,325,299	0.652 (Medium)
35.17	Jombang Regency	Jombang	1,109.84	1,126,930	1,202,407	1,318,062	1,362,697	0.690 (Medium)
35.19	Madiun Regency	Caruban	1,113.63	639,825	662,278	744,350	757,839	0.686 (Medium)
35.77	Madiun City		36.13	163,956	170,964	195,175	201,767	0.788 (High)
35.20	Magetan Regency	Magetan	706.44	615,254	620,442	670,812	685,500	0.702 (High)
35.18	Nganjuk Regency	Nganjuk	1,289.07	973,472	1,017,030	1,103,902	1,131,777	0.695 (Medium)
35.21	Ngawi Regency	Ngawi	1,395.80	813,228	817,765	870,057	884,086	0.677 (Medium)
35.23	Tuban Regency	Tuban	1,973.50	1,051,999	1,118,464	1,198,012	1,225,205	0.645 (Medium)
	Northwest region totals		9,937.04	6,550,065	6,819,323	7,402,005	7,574,170	
	East Java (excluding Madura) totals		42,628.39	31,535,693	33,853,994	36,661,132	37,657,838	
35.26	Bangkalan Regency	Bangkalan	1,301.03	805,048	906,761	1,060,377	1,102,522	0.607 (Medium)
35.27	Sampang Regency	Sampang	1,228.25	750,046	877,772	969,694	1,016,254	0.569 (Medium)
35.28	Pamekasan Regency	Pamekasan	795.15	689,225	795,918	850,057	884,697	0.626 (Medium)
35.29	Sumenep Regency	Sumenep	2,084.02	985,981	1,042,312	1,124,436	1,153,188	0.614 (Medium)
	Madura region totals		5,408.45	3,230,300	3,622,763	4,004,564	4,156,661	
	Total for all regions		48,036.84	34,765,993	37,476,757	40,665,696	41,814,499	0.681 (Medium)

Note: (a) the 2000 population of Batu City is included in the total for Malang Regency, from which it was separated on 21 June 2001.
