= Kholilurrahman =

Indonesian politician

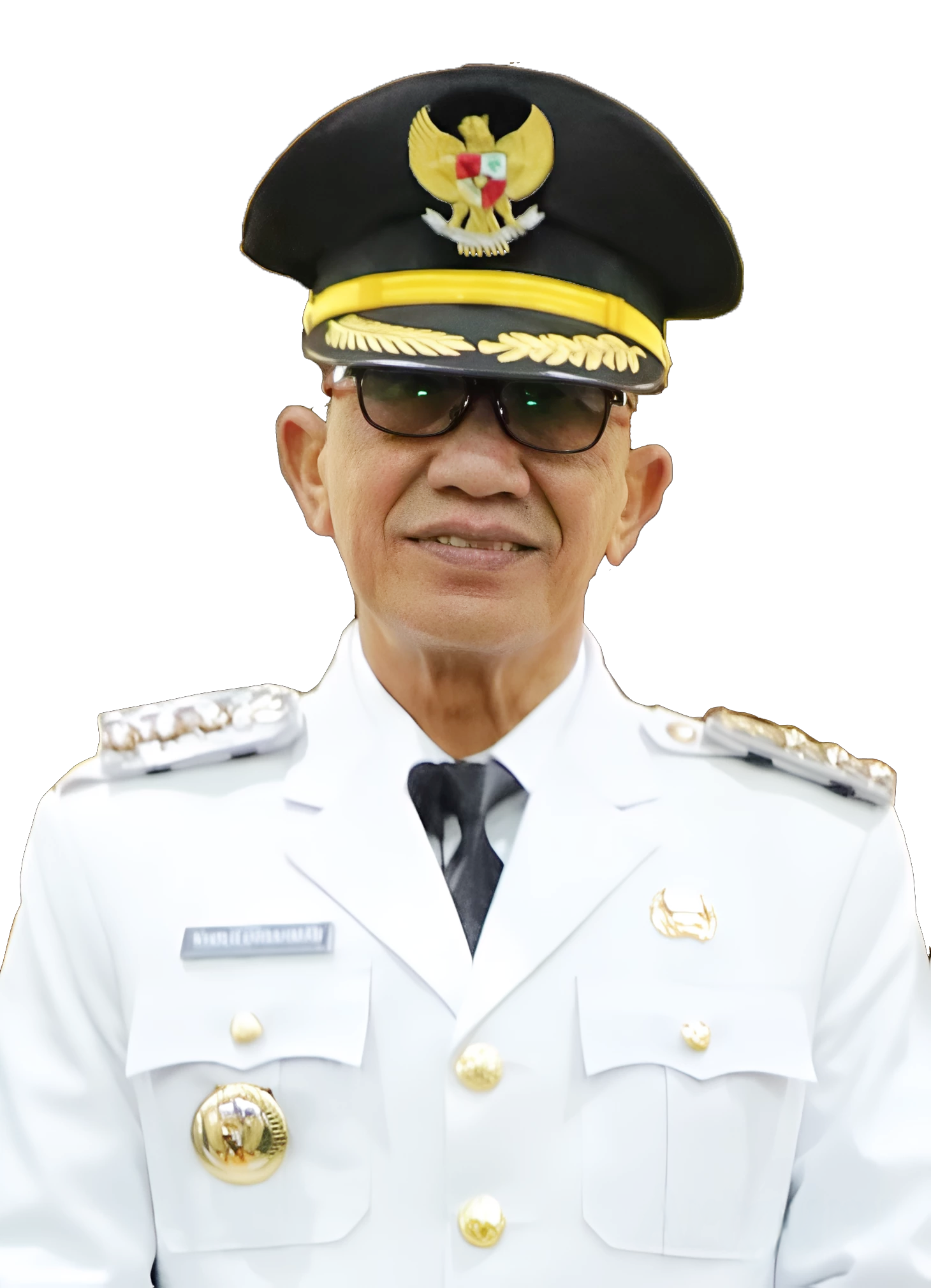
- 2025 portrait

Regent of Pamekasan
- Incumbent
- Assumed office 19 March 2025
- Preceded by: Masrukin (act.); Baddrut Tamam
- In office 21 April 2008 – 21 April 2013
- Preceded by: Achmad Syafi'i Yasin
- Succeeded by: Achmad Syafi'i Yasin

Member of the House of Representatives
- In office 1 October 2014 – 22 January 2018
- Constituency: East Java XI
- Majority: 146,054

Personal details
- Born: 14 June 1960 (age 66) Probolinggo, East Java, Indonesia

Kholilurrahman (born 14 June 1960) is an Indonesian politician and ulama who is the regent of Pamekasan Regency, East Java, serving since March 2025. He had previously served as Pamekasan's regent between 2008 and 2013, and was a member of the House of Representatives representing Madura Island between 2014 and 2018. He has run the Matsaradul Huda pesantren in Pamekasan since 1991, and was elected to the East Java Regional House of Representatives in 1999 and 2004 as a member of the National Awakening Party (PKB).

== Early life ==
Kholilurrahman was born on 14 June 1960 in Probolinggo, East Java. He was the son of Hasan Abdul Wafi (1923–2000), a Pamekasan-born Nahdlatul Ulama figure. After completing middle school in Probolinggo, Kholilurrahman moved to Malang where he graduated from a state-funded madrasa, and then he received a bachelor's in law from Darul Ulum University in Jombang.

== Career ==
In 1991, Kholilurrahman began to run the Matsaradul Huda pesantren in Pamekasan, which had previously been run by his uncle Ahmad Syarqawi (d. 1990). Kholilurrahman was also elected to the East Java Regional House of Representatives (DPRD) in 1999 and 2004 as a member of the National Awakening Party (PKB). In 2007, he became chairman of PKB's Pamekasan branch.

He resigned from the DPRD to run in Pamekasan's 2008 regency election, defeating incumbent regent Achmad Syafi'i Yasin in a three-way race. His running mate, Kadarisman Sastrodiwirdjo, had been Yasin's deputy. Kholilurrahman and Kadarisman were sworn in on 21 April 2008. During his first term, Kholilurrahman issued a bylaw prohibiting smoking in certain buildings and public areas, along with restricting fundraisers for mosque constructions along roads. Yasin would defeat Kholilurrahman in the next election in 2013.

After his first term, Kholilurrahman was elected into the national House of Representatives in 2014 as a PKB member representing East Java's 11th district (Madura Island). Becoming a member of the body's Sixth Commission, he resigned from the legislature on 22 January 2018 to run in Pamekasan's 2018 regency election, and was replaced by Muhammad Unais Ali Hisyam. He was defeated by Baddrut Tamam in the election. He switched to the NasDem Party to run in the 2019 Indonesian legislative election from the same district, but failed to secure a seat.

Kholilurrahman made another attempt for a second term in Pamekasan in its 2024 regency election, with Sukriyanto, a village head, as his running mate. They won the three-way election after securing 291,246 votes (50.9%). After a Constitutional Court of Indonesia challenge to the election results was defeated, they were sworn in on 19 March 2025.

== Personal life ==
He is married to Roihana Kholilurrahman.
