= 2024 Pamekasan regency election =

Local election in Indonesia

- 27 November 2024
- Turnout: 87.2%
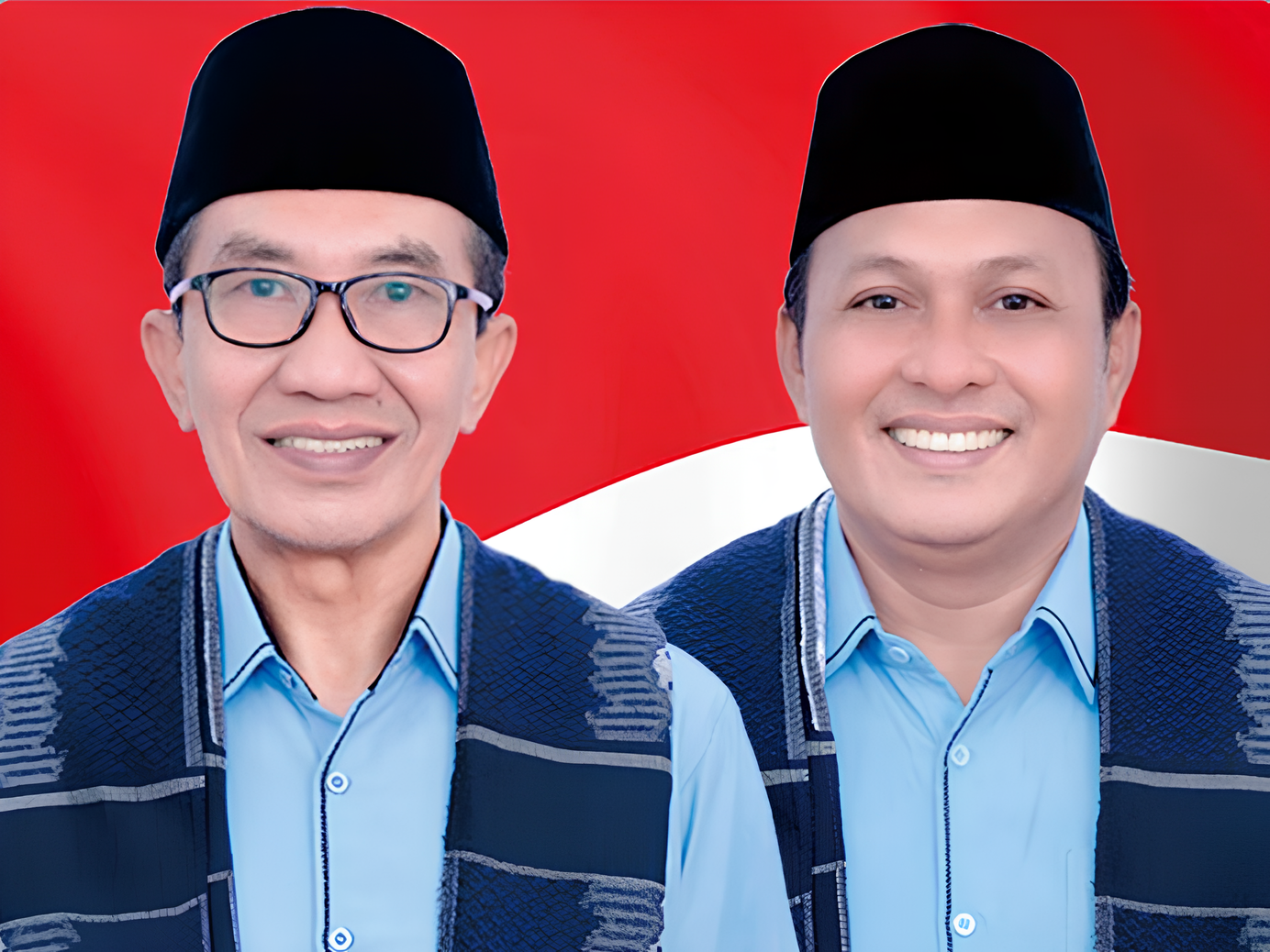

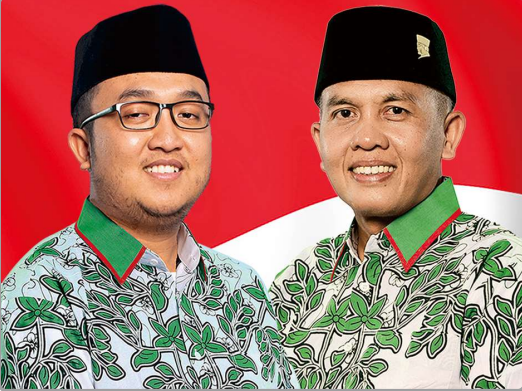
| Candidate | Kholilurrahman | Muhammad Baqir Aminatullah |
| Party | Independent | PPP |
| Running mate | Sukriyanto | Taufadi |
| Popular vote | 291,246 | 263,740 |
| Percentage | 50.9% | 46.1% |
Regent before election
Masrukin
Independent
Elected Regent
Kholilurrahman
Independent

The 2024 Pamekasan regency election was held on 27 November 2024 as part of nationwide local elections to elect the regent of Pamekasan Regency, East Java for a five-year term. The previous regent Badrut Tamam failed to participate in the election, which was won by 2008–2013 regent Kholilurrahman.

== Electoral system ==
The election, like other local elections in 2024, follow the first-past-the-post system where the candidate with the most votes wins the election, even if they do not win a majority. It is possible for a candidate to run uncontested, in which case the candidate is still required to win a majority of votes "against" an "empty box" option. Should the candidate fail to do so, the election will be repeated on a later date.

On 19 September 2024, Pamekasan's General Elections Commission (KPU) announced that the electorate size was 666,048 voters, who were to vote in 1,270 polling stations. KPU alone spent Rp 43.2 billion (USD 2.7 million) to run the election. To secure the election, 3,802 security personnel were deployed, including 2,540 local community security officers and 200 personnel of the Mobile Brigade Corps.

== Candidates ==
The regent of Pamekasan between 2018 and 2023, Badrut Tamam of the National Awakening Party (PKB), was eligible to run for the election, but ultimately did not do so after failing to secure the support of his party. PKB instead backed Fattah Jasin, former civil servant and briefly Tamam's deputy replacing his elected vice regent Raja'e. Jasin's running mate was Mujahid Ansori, a 2009–2019 member of the East Java Regional House of Representatives from the United Development Party (PPP). The pair was supported by PKB, PBB, Gerindra, Golkar, and PKS along with five parties without local legislature seats.

Kholilurrahman, who had previously served as Pamekasan's regent between 2008–2013 and member of the House of Representatives in 2014–2018 as a PKB member, also contested the election. As his running mate was Sukriyanto, the village head of Blaban village in Pamekasan's Batumarmar district. They received the endorsements of Nasdem, Demokrat, PAN, and Gelora.

The United Development Party and the Indonesian Democratic Party of Struggle, with further endorsements from Hanura and Perindo, backed the 25-year old (26 on the election date) Muhammad Baqir Aminatullah in the election. Aminatullah is the son of Hasan Baqir, a local pesantren head. His running mate was Taufadi, who had previously been imprisoned for a corruption case.

== Campaign ==
Three rounds of debates were held between the candidates, organized by KPU.

== Results ==
| Candidate | Running mate | Candidate party | Votes | % |
|---|---|---|---|---|
| Kholilurrahman | Sukriyanto | Independent | 291,246 | 50.89 |
| Muhammad Baqir Aminatullah | Taufadi | PPP | 263,740 | 46.08 |
| Fattah Jasin | Ahmad Mujahid Ansori | Independent | 17,307 | 3.02 |
| Total | | | 572,293 | 100.00 |
| Valid votes | | | 572,293 | 98.57 |
| Invalid/blank votes | | | 8,299 | 1.43 |
| Total votes | | | 580,592 | 100.00 |
| Registered voters/turnout | | | 666,048 | 87.17 |

== Aftermath ==
A lawsuit was filed to the Constitutional Court of Indonesia after the results were announced by Aminatullah and Taufadi. The suit was rejected on 24 February 2025. Due to the delay caused by the lawsuit, Kholilurrahman and Sukriyanto were sworn in on 19 March 2025 by Governor of East Java Khofifah Indar Parawansa, instead of President Prabowo Subianto on 20 February as with most other regional leaders elected in 2024.
