= Faisol Riza =

Indonesian politician (born 1973)

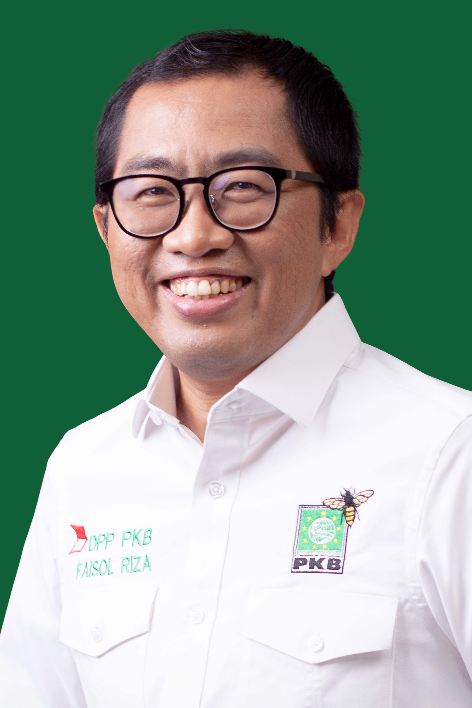

Deputy Minister of Industry
- Incumbent
- Assumed office 21 October 2024
- President: Prabowo Subianto
- Minister: Agus Gumiwang Kartasasmita
- Preceded by: Alex Retraubun

Member of House of Representatives
- In office 20 March 2018 – 20 October 2024; Interim Replacement until 30 September 2019
- President: Joko Widodo
- Speaker: Bambang Soesatyo; Puan Maharani
- Parliamentary group: National Awakening Party Faction
- Constituency: East Java II
- Majority: 72.188 (2014); 82.777 (2019); 214.779 (2024)
- Preceded by: Abdul Malik Haramain
- Succeeded by: Anisah Syakur

Personal details
- Born: 1 January 1973 (age 53) Kraksaan, Probolinggo Regency, East Java
- Party: National Awakening Party
- Other political affiliations: (previously People's Democratic Party)
- Relations: Dhohir Farisi (Little Brother); Hasan Aminuddin (Cousin)
- Education: Driyarkara School of Philosophy (S.S.); University of Indonesia (M.A.)
- Profession: Politician

Faisol Riza (born 1 January 1973) is an Indonesian politician and activist. He was once a victim of activist abductions during the New Order era. Since 21 October 2024, he has served as Deputy Minister of Industry in the Red and White Cabinet.

== Early life and education ==
Riza was born on 1 January 1973 in Kraksaan, Probolinggo Regency. He began his education at Madrasah Ibtidaiyah (Islamic Elementary School) Nahdlatul Ulama, continued his junior high school at Madrasah Tsanawiyah (Islamic Junior High School) Nurul Jadid, and completed his senior high school at Madrasah Aliyah (Islamic Senior High School) Nurul Jadid. He then pursued higher education at the Driyarkara School of Philosophy, majoring in philosophy. He later continued his master’s degree at the University of Indonesia, majoring in public administration.

== Activism ==
During his undergraduate studies, Riza served as Chairman of the Students’ Solidarity for Democracy (SMID), which was one of the organizations affiliated with the People’s Democratic Party (PRD). He became one of the victims of 1997–98 activists kidnappings after attending a press conference of the National Committee for the Struggle for Democracy at the Indonesian Legal Aid Foundation (YLBHI) on 12 March 1998, together with Herman Hendrawan and Raharja Waluya Jati. After the event, he and Jati attempted to escape to Dr. Cipto Mangunkusumo Hospital as they were being pursued by the abductors, but the attempt failed and they were cornered on the hospital’s second floor. They were beaten and kicked until their bodies were covered in bruises, and Riza’s glasses were shattered. In addition, the abductors tortured him on a block of ice and burned him with cigarette butts. Eventually, he was released because of his background as someone who had studied within Nahdlatul Ulama. The detention lasted for 2–3 days before he was sent back to Probolinggo and Jati to Semarang, while Hendrawan was declared missing. The interrogation questions revolved around their activities in SMID and PRD, as well as their connections with Amien Rais, Megawati Soekarnoputri, and Sofyan Wanandi. Alongside the three of them, others who were also detained included Pius Lustrilanang, Desmond J. Mahesa, Haryanto Taslam, Yani Afri, and Sonny.

Riza also served as Vice Chairperson of the Indonesian Association of Families of the Disappeared (IKOHI) from 2005 to 2024. He also served as Chairman of the Indonesian Rock Climbing Federation (FPTI) from 2015 to 2019, after which he was succeeded by Yenny Wahid.

== Career ==
=== Politics ===
At the beginning, he served as chairman of the PRD before joining the National Awakening Party (PKB). He joined PKB in 2008 as Deputy Chairperson of the Regional Leadership Council (DPW) of PKB, a position he held from 2008 to 2009. Afterwards, he became Deputy Secretary-General of the Jakarta Regional Leadership Council (DPW PKB) starting in 2009. In 2009, he served as an Expert Staff at the Ministry of Manpower and Transmigration until 2014. Then, he served as Special Staff at the Ministry of Youth and Sports from 2014 to 2017.

Riza became a Member of the House of Representatives on 20 March 2018, replacing Abdul Malik Haramain, who resigned to run as a candidate for Regent of Probolinggo Regency in the 2018 Probolinggo regency election. Subsequently, he ran in the 2019 Indonesian legislative election from the East Java II electoral district, winning 82,777 votes. He also served as Chairman of Commission VI of the House of Representatives. During that period, he also became the Head of the Department of Sports, Arts, and Millennials of the PKB Central Leadership Council (DPP) until 2024. He briefly served as Chairman of the Jambi Regional Leadership Council of PKB (DPW PKB) in 2024 before being succeeded by Elpisina on 10 October 2024. Currently, he has served as Deputy Chairman of the DPP PKB since 18 September 2024. On 21 October 2024, he was appointed as Deputy Minister of Industry, with assets reported in the 2022 State Officials’ Wealth Report amounting to Rp 5.6 billion.

== Controversies ==
Riza was once summoned by the Corruption Eradication Commission (KPK) as a witness in the corruption case involving grant funds of the National Sports Committee of Indonesia for Miftahul Ulum, the personal assistant of Imam Nahrawi who was also declared a suspect. However, he failed to appear without a clear reason.
