= Wonotoro =

- Location in East Java and Indonesia Wonotoro (Indonesia)
- Coordinates: 7°54′25.074″S 112°59′55.5144″E
- Country: Indonesia
- Province: East Java
- Regency: Probolinggo Regency
- District: Sukapura District
- Elevation: 7,392 ft (2,253 m)

Population (2010)
  - Total: 728
- Time zone: UTC+7 (Western Indonesia Time)

Wonotoro (Indonesian pronunciation: [wɔnɔˈt̪ɔrɔ]) is a village in Sukapura District, Probolinggo Regency in East Java Province. Its population is 728.

== Climate ==
Wonotoro has a subtropical highland climate (Cwb). It has moderate to little rainfall from May to October and heavy to very heavy rainfall from November to April.

Climate data for Wonotoro
Month	Jan	Feb	Mar	Apr	May	Jun	Jul	Aug	Sep	Oct	Nov	Dec	Year
Mean daily maximum °C (°F)	17.0 (62.6)	17.2 (63.0)	17.4 (63.3)	17.2 (63.0)	17.3 (63.1)	16.7 (62.1)	16.1 (61.0)	16.4 (61.5)	16.9 (62.4)	17.5 (63.5)	17.3 (63.1)	17.2 (63.0)	17.0 (62.6)
Daily mean °C (°F)	13.3 (55.9)	13.4 (56.1)	13.7 (56.7)	13.3 (55.9)	13.2 (55.8)	12.5 (54.5)	11.6 (52.9)	11.9 (53.4)	12.3 (54.1)	13.1 (55.6)	13.7 (56.7)	13.5 (56.3)	13.0 (55.3)
Mean daily minimum °C (°F)	9.7 (49.5)	9.6 (49.3)	10.1 (50.2)	9.5 (49.1)	9.1 (48.4)	8.4 (47.1)	7.2 (45.0)	7.4 (45.3)	7.8 (46.0)	8.8 (47.8)	10.1 (50.2)	9.8 (49.6)	9.0 (48.1)
Average precipitation mm (inches)	298 (11.7)	336 (13.2)	348 (13.7)	180 (7.1)	103 (4.1)	63 (2.5)	34 (1.3)	15 (0.6)	18 (0.7)	68 (2.7)	142 (5.6)	313 (12.3)	1,918 (75.5)
Source: Climate-Data.org
