= Agus Black Hoe Budianto =

Indonesian politician (born 1980s)

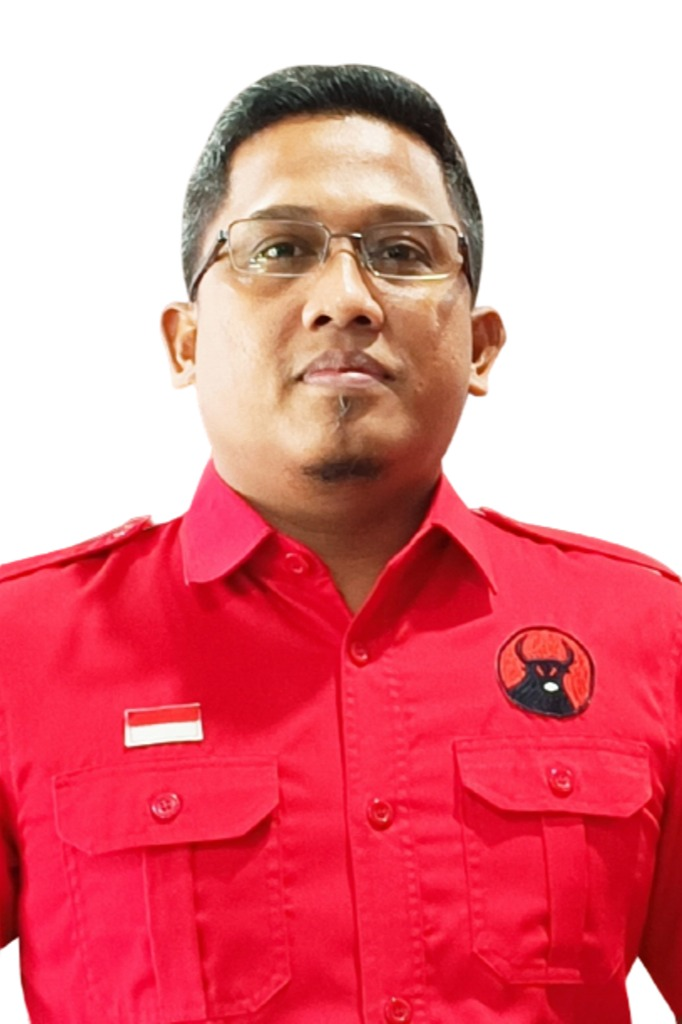
- 2024 election portrait

Member of East Java DPRD
- In office 31 August 2024 – 6 October 2025
- Succeeded by: Diana A.V. Sasa
- Majority: 57,151

Personal details
- Born: Agus Budianto; 1980 or 1981 (Note: Aged 43 at the time of the 2024 election.) Ngawi, Indonesia
- Party: PDI-P

Agus Budianto (born 1980 or 1981), better known as Agus Black Hoe Budianto, is an Indonesian politician, businessman, and former police officer. He was a member of the East Java Regional House of Representatives, serving from 2024 until his resignation in 2025. Originating from Ngawi Regency, he was part of the local police force for 19 years and owned a poultry farm in the regency.

== Early life ==
Budianto was born at the village of Grudo in Ngawi (city), Ngawi. According to Budianto, he adopted the nickname "Black Hoe" in order to distinguish himself from other people named Agus at his home village, and the nickname derived from his dark skin and his work at his parents' field with a hoe. He completed high school in Tabanan, Bali in 2001, and later received a degree from a university in Ngawi.

== Career ==
In 2003, he joined the police force in Ngawi's district police, where he served within its intelligence and security department from 2003 to 2022. In 2019, he founded a broiler chicken farm in Ngawi, named the "Black Hoe" farm. Starting with 60,000 birds in 2019, it had 300,000 birds by 2023. He also founded the Black Hoe Racing Team, a Ngawi-based motorcycle racing team, in 2022. He reported his assets at Rp 12.5 billion in 2023, consisting mostly of land and property in Ngawi.

Budianto resigned early from the police force and entered politics as a member of the Indonesian Democratic Party of Struggle (PDI-P). He also became active within the GP Ansor organization in Ngawi.

=== DPRD ===
He ran for a seat in the East Java Regional House of Representatives (DPRD) in the 2024 Indonesian legislative election as a PDI-P candidate in the East Java 9th district, covering Ngawi and four other regencies. He was elected with 57,151 votes as one of two PDI-P legislators from the district, and was sworn in on 31 August 2024. He was appointed into the DPRD's Commission D. As a legislator, he called for the development of affordable housing for young workers in the province's urban areas, lobbied for a freeway exit to be developed in Magetan Regency, and criticized the provincial government for the poor road accessibility of the newly opened Dhoho Airport in Kediri.

In October 2025, Ngawi's district police announced that Budianto had tested positive for drug use. In response, Budianto denied the announcement, claiming that he had only visited a police station related to an administrative affair with his business. He later announced his resignation from the DPRD on 6 October 2025 citing psychological pressure to his family due to media reports. He was the second PDI-P member of East Java DPRD to resign in 2024–2029, after another legislator resigned the previous year due to a bribery case. The party later ordered all its members in the DPRD to take urine tests to prevent similar incidents in the future. Budianto also lost his leadership post in Ngawi's GP Ansor as a result of the scandal.

== Personal life ==
He is married and has two children.
