= M. Soegiono =

Indonesian politician (born 1922)

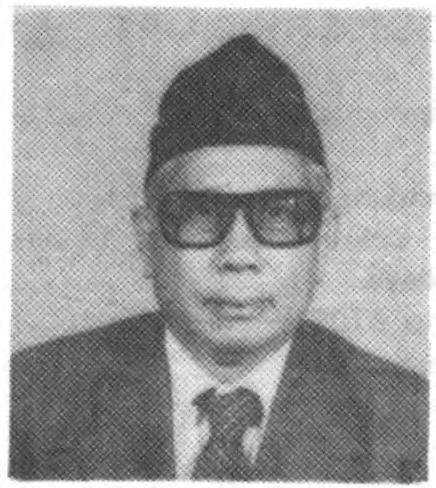
- Soegiono in 1982

Member of the People's Representative Council
- In office 1 October 1982 – 1 October 1987
- Constituency: East Java

Vice Governor of East Java
- In office 30 March 1977 – 10 October 1981
- Governor: Soenandar Prijosoedarmo
- Preceded by: Satrio Sastrodiredjo (1965)
- Succeeded by: Soeparmanto

Member of the Malang Regional People's Representative Council
- In office 1963–1968

Personal details
- Born: 22 January 1922 Blora, East Java, Dutch East Indies
- Party: Golkar

M. Soegiono (born 22 January 1922) was an Indonesian bureaucrat and politician who served as the Vice Governor of East Java from 1977 until 1981 and member of the People's Representative Council from 1982 until 1987.

== Early life and education ==
Soegiono was born on 22 January 1922 in Blora, East Java. He completed his primary education at the Hollandsch-Inlandsche School in 1938, junior high school education at the Meer Uitgebreid Lager Onderwijs in 1940, and high school education at the Algemene Middelbare School in 1943. During his time in high school, Soegiono was a member of the Cahaya Laut football club.

== Career ==
Upon graduating from high school, Soegiono was employed by the Japanese colonial government in the Dutch East Indies as an archivist in the Surabaya government office. After Indonesia's independence in 1945, Soegiono continued to work in the Surabaya government office. He chaired Surabaya's local youth union and was appointed as the chief of staff of Surabaya's militia group. He was entrusted to secure the governor's office complex during the Battle of Surabaya.

Following Dutch military operations in East Java, Soegiono and other civil servants were evacuated to the rural East Java. Soegiono was reassigned to Jombang, where he became a district chief. Soegiono kept his leading role among Surabayan civil servants and participated in the dismantling of the East Java puppet state. He returned to Surabaya in 1950 and became the head of the government section in Surabaya's government office for a brief period. He was reassigned to the Tuban Regency in the same year and became the regional secretary.

After eight years of service in Tuban, Soegiono was transferred to Malang with the same position. He became Malang's regional secretary for around four years and was appointed by the local government to represent civil servants in the Malang Regional People's Representative Council. He held office in the parliament until 1968, when he was promoted by the governor as assistant for the Malang region.

Soegiono was appointed as the vice governor of East Java after becoming the governor's assistant for almost a decade. Prior to his appointment, the office was vacant for around twelve years after the arrest of the previous officeholder, Satrio Sastrodiredjo, in 1965. Soegiono was installed as vice governor in Surabaya on 30 March 1977. Shortly after this, Soegiono joined Golkar.

During his tenure as vice governor, Soegiono oversaw the dismissal of the mayor of Blitar, Harto Haryono, for allegedly misusing official funds allocated by the provincial government.

Soegiono retired from civil service on 31 January 1981 and was replaced on 10 October by Soeparmanto. He was then nominated by Golkar for a seat in the People's Representative Council. He was elected as a representative of the Jember Regency and served for a single five-year term until 1987. In the council, Soegiono was seated in Commission IV, which handles matters relating to the environment. He was the commission's deputy chairman from 1983 until 1984.
