= Soeparmanto =

Indonesian bureaucrat

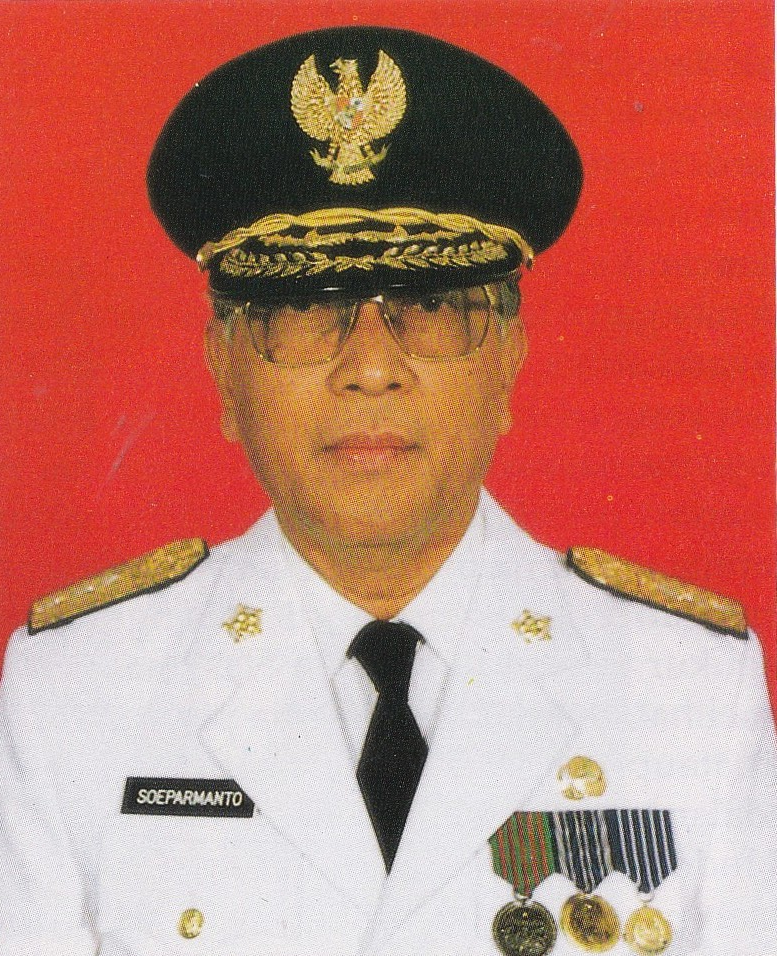

Governor of Central Kalimantan
- In office 23 January 1989 – 22 January 1994
- Preceded by: Gatot Amrih
- Succeeded by: Warsito Rasman

Vice Governor of East Java (Note: No portofolio until 1985, held the portofolio of economic development since 1985)
- In office 10 October 1981 – 23 January 1989 Serving with Trimarjono (from 1985)
- Governor: Soenandar Prijosoedarmo; Wahono; Soelarso
- Preceded by: M. Soegiono
- Succeeded by: Warsito Rasman

Personal details
- Born: October 29, 1932 Widodaren, Ngawi, Dutch East Indies
- Died: April 11, 2009 (aged 76) Surabaya, East Java, Indonesia
- Party: Golkar
- Spouse: Sri Manik
- Children: 3
- Education: Gadjah Mada University (Drs.)

Soeparmanto (29 October 1932 – 11 April 2009) was an Indonesian bureaucrat who served as the Vice Governor of East Java from 1981 until 1989 and the Governor of Central Kalimantan from 1989 until 1994.

== Early life ==
Soeparmanto was born in Widodaren, Ngawi on 29 October 1932. (Note: Mimbar Departemen Dalam Negeri (1981) stated his birth date as 29 November 1931.) He completed his primary education at the People's School in Banjaran, Kediri, in 1945, junior high school in Blitar in 1948, and high school education in Kediri in 1952.

== Career ==
Upon completing high school, Soeparmanto joined the civil service. Seven years after that, he was sent to study governance sciences at Gadjah Mada University. He graduated from the university with a doctorandus in 1961.

On 5 November 1966, Soeparmanto was chosen as the secretary to the Director General of General Government and Regional Autonomy, Soenandar Prijosoedarmo. In early 1978, Soeparmanto was entrusted by the Minister of Home Affairs to lead the civil servants union inside the Department of Home Affairs.

After almost two decades working inside the Department of Home Affairs, Soeparmanto was posted to East Java as vice governor. He was installed for the position on 10 October 1981. He initially served as vice governor alone for four years until former provincial secretary Trimarjono was named as the second vice governor in 1985. Soeparmanto was assigned the portofolio of economic development, while Trimarjono was assigned the portofolio of welfare affairs.

Following an eight-year service in East Java as vice governor, Soeparmanto was nominated as the governor of Central Kalimantan. In an internal election held by the Central Kalimantan parliament, Soeparmanto won a majority of votes, defeating local candidates. He was sworn in on 23 January 1989.

At the end of his term, the central government tried to put former West Java vice governor Karna Suwanda as his successor, but failed due to the strong resistance from local politicians. Soeparmanto was eventually succeeded by Warsito Rasman, who happened to also succeed him as vice governor, albeit in an acting capacity. The government managed to install Warsito Rasman as a definitive governor through political maneuvers.

== Personal life ==
Soeparmanto was married to Sri Manik. The couple has three children.

Soeparmanto died on the morning of 11 April 2009 at his residence in Surabaya.
