= Ministry of Industry (Indonesia) =

Indonesian government ministry

- Kementerian Perindustrian
- Logo of the Ministry of Industry

- Flag of the Ministry of Industry

- Ministry of Industry headquarters

Agency overview
- Formed: 21 January 1950
- Jurisdiction: Government of Indonesia
- Headquarters: Jalan Jenderal Gatot Subroto Kav. 52-53, Jakarta Selatan 12950, Jakarta, Indonesia
- Ministers responsible: Agus Gumiwang Kartasasmita, Minister of Industry; Faisol Riza, Deputy Minister of Industry
- Website: www.kemenperin.go.id

Ministry of Industry (Indonesian: Kementerian Perindustrian) is an Indonesian ministry. The ministry is under, and is responsible to, the President of Indonesia.

== History ==
The industrial portfolio was under Ministry of Welfare (Indonesian: Kementerian Kemakmuran) from 1945 to 1950. In 1950, industrial portfolio was under Ministry of Trade and Industry (Indonesian: Kementerian Perdagangan dan Perindustrian). After 1952, industrial portfolio was part of portfolios under Ministry of Economic Affairs (Indonesian: Kementerian Perekonomian). In 1959, industrial portfolio was part of portfolios under Ministry of Industry (Indonesian: Kementerian Perindustrian). After 1952, industrial portfolio was divided into 2 departments, those are Department of Basic Industry and Mining (Indonesian: Departemen Perindustrian Dasar dan Pertambangan) and Department of People's Industry (Indonesian: Departemen Perindustrian Rakyat).

== Responsibilities ==
The ministry's functions are:

- coordination and synchronization of formulation, determination, and execution of ministerial policy in industry
- execution of technical guidance and supervision of policy implementation in industry
- research and development in industry
- implementation of substantial and administrative support in ministerial organization
- management of state assets under the responsibility of the ministry

== Organization ==
Based on Presidential Decree No. 167/2024 and Ministry of Industry Decree No. 1/2025, The ministry is organized as follows:

1. Office of the Ministry of Industry
2. Office of the Deputy Ministry of Industry
3. Board of Experts
  1. Senior Expert to the Minister on Industrial Upstreaming, Distribution, and Equalization
  2. Senior Expert to the Minister on Business Climate and Investment
  3. Senior Expert to the Minister on Domestic Industrial Capability Development
  4. Senior Expert to the Minister on Industrial Transformation 4.0 Acceleration
4. General Secretariat
  1. Bureau of Planning
  2. Bureau of Organization, Human Resources, and Bureaucratic Reform
  3. Bureau of Finance
  4. Bureau of Law
  5. Bureau of Public Relations
  6. Bureau of General Affairs
  7. Centers (attached to General Secretariat)
    1. Center for Data, Information, and Technology
    2. Center for Domestic Products Utilization Improvement
    3. Center for Halal Industries
5. Directorate General of Agricultural Industries (Directorate General I)
  1. Directorate General of Agricultural Industries Secretariat
  2. Directorate of Forestry and Plantation Products Industry
  3. Directorate of Food, Marine, and Fishery Products Industry
  4. Directorate of Beverages, Tobacco, and Freshener Products Industry
  5. Directorate of Chemurgy, Oleochemistry, and Animal Feed
6. Directorate General of Chemical, Pharmacy, and Textile Industries (Directorate General II)
  1. Directorate General of Chemical, Pharmacy, and Textile Industries Secretariat
  2. Directorate of Upstream Chemistry
  3. Directorate of Downstream Chemistry and Pharmacy
  4. Directorate of Cement, Ceramics, and Nonmetals Processing
  5. Directorate of Textile, Leather, and Footwear
7. Directorate General of Metal, Machinery, Transportation and Electronics Industries (Directorate General III)
  1. Directorate General of Metal, Machinery, Transportation and Electronics Industries Secretariat
  2. Directorate of Metal Industries
  3. Directorate of Machinery and Agricultural Machinery Industries
  4. Directorate of Maritime, Transportation, and Defense Industries
  5. Directorate of Electronics and Telematics Industries
8. Directorate General of Small and Medium Industries (Directorate General IV)
  1. Directorate General of Small and Medium Industries Secretariat
  2. Directorate of Small and Medium Industries in Food, Furniture, and Building Materials
  3. Directorate of Small and Medium Industries in Chemistry, Clothing, and Handicraft
  4. Directorate of Small and Medium Industries in Metal, Machinery, Electronics, and Transportation
  5. Directorate of Small and Medium Industries in Variety Industries
  6. Indonesian Institute for Shoe Industries Empowerment, Sidoarjo
  7. Indonesian Institute for Fashion and Crafts, Denpasar
9. Directorate General of Industrial Resilience, Regional Affairs, and International Industrial Access (Directorate General V)
  1. Directorate General of Industrial Resilience, Regional Development, and International Industry Access Secretariat
  2. Directorate of Industrial Resilience and Business Climate
  3. Directorate of Industrial Regional Affairs
  4. Directorate of International Industrial Access
  5. Directorate of Industrial Resources Access and International Promotion
10. Inspectorate General
  1. Inspectorate General Secretariat
  2. Inspectorate I
  3. Inspectorate II
  4. Inspectorate III
  5. Inspectorate IV
  6. Investigation Inspectorate
11. Agency for Industrial Standards and Industrial Services Policies
  1. Center for Industrial Standards Formulation, Application, and Enforcement
  2. Center for Industrial Standards Monitoring
  3. Center for Optimization of Industrial Technological Utilization and Industrial Services Policies
  4. Center for Green Industry
  5. Indonesian Center for Industrial Standardization and Services for Chemical, Pharmaceutical, and Packaging Industries, East Jakarta
  6. Indonesian Center for Industrial Standardization and Services for Agricultural Industries, Bogor
  7. Indonesian Center for Industrial Standardization and Services for Ceramics and Non-metal Industries, Bandung
  8. Indonesian Center for Industrial Standardization and Services for Textiles, Bandung
  9. Indonesian Center for Industrial Standardization and Services for Engineering Materials and Technical Goods, Bandung
  10. Indonesian Center for Industrial Standardization and Services for Cellulose, Bandung Regency
  11. Indonesian Center for Industrial Standardization and Services for Metals and Machinery Industries, Bandung
  12. Indonesian Center for Industrial Standardization and Services for Leather, Rubber, and Plastic Industries, Yogyakarta
  13. Indonesian Center for Industrial Standardization and Services for Handicraft and Batik, Yogyakarta
  14. Indonesian Center for Industrial Standardization and Services for Industrial Pollution Prevention, Semarang
  15. Indonesian Center for Industrial Standardization and Services for Plantation Products, Metallic Minerals, and Maritime Industries, Makassar
  16. Banda Aceh Institute for Industrial Standardization and Services, Banda Aceh
  17. Medan Institute for Industrial Standardization and Services, Medan
  18. Padang Institute for Industrial Standardization and Services, Padang
  19. Palembang Institute for Industrial Standardization and Services, Palembang
  20. Bandar Lampung Institute for Industrial Standardization and Services, Bandar Lampung
  21. Surabaya Institute for Industrial Standardization and Services, Surabaya
  22. Banjarbaru Institute for Industrial Standardization and Services, Banjarbaru
  23. Pontianak Institute for Industrial Standardization and Services, Pontianak
  24. Samarinda Institute for Industrial Standardization and Services, Samarinda
  25. Manado Institute for Industrial Standardization and Services, Manado
  26. Ambon Institute for Industrial Standardization and Services, Ambon
  27. Pekanbaru Institute for Industrial Standardization and Services, Pekanbaru
  28. Jakarta Institute for Industrial Standardization and Services, Jakarta
12. Agency for Industrial Human Resources Development
  1. Center for Apparatuses Fostering, Education, and Training
    1. Indonesian Institute for Industrial Education and Training, Medan
    2. Indonesian Institute for Industrial Education and Training, Padang
    3. Indonesian Institute for Industrial Education and Training, Jakarta
    4. Indonesian Institute for Industrial Education and Training, Yogyakarta
    5. Indonesian Institute for Industrial Education and Training, Surabaya
    6. Indonesian Institute for Industrial Education and Training, Makassar
    7. Indonesian Institute for Industrial Education and Training, Denpasar
  2. Center for Industrial Human Resources Education and Training
    1. Indonesian Polytechnic for Industrial Management "STMI", Jakarta
    2. Indonesian Polytechnic for Textile "STTT", Bandung
    3. Indonesian Polytechnic for Company Leaders "APP", Jakarta
    4. Indonesian Polytechnic for Chemical Analyst "AKA", Bogor
    5. Indonesian Polytechnic for Leather Technology "ATK", Yogyakarta
    6. Indonesian Polytechnic for Industrial Technology "ATI", Padang
    7. Indonesian Polytechnic for Industrial Technology "ATI", Makassar
    8. Indonesian Polytechnic for Chemical Industrial Technology, Medan
    9. Indonesian Polytechnic for Petrochemistry, Banten
    10. Indonesian Polytechnic for Metal Industries, Morowali
    11. Indonesian Polytechnic for Furniture and Wood Processing, Kendal
    12. Indonesian Community Academy for Textile and Textile Products, Surakarta
    13. Indonesian Community Academy for Manufacture Industries, Bantaeng
  3. Center for Industrial Vocational Development
    1. Bogor Vocational Senior High School for Chemical Analyst
    2. Makassar Vocational Senior High School for Chemical Analyst
    3. Padang Vocational Senior High School for Chemical Analyst
    4. Makassar Vocational Senior High School for Industrial Technology
    5. Banda Aceh Vocational Senior High School for Industrial Technology
    6. Bandar Lampung Vocational Senior High School for Industrial Technology
    7. Padang Vocational Senior High School for Industrial Technology
    8. Pontianak Vocational Senior High School for Industrial Technology
