= Ony Anwar Harsono =

Indonesian politician

H. Ony Anwar Harsono S.T. M.H.
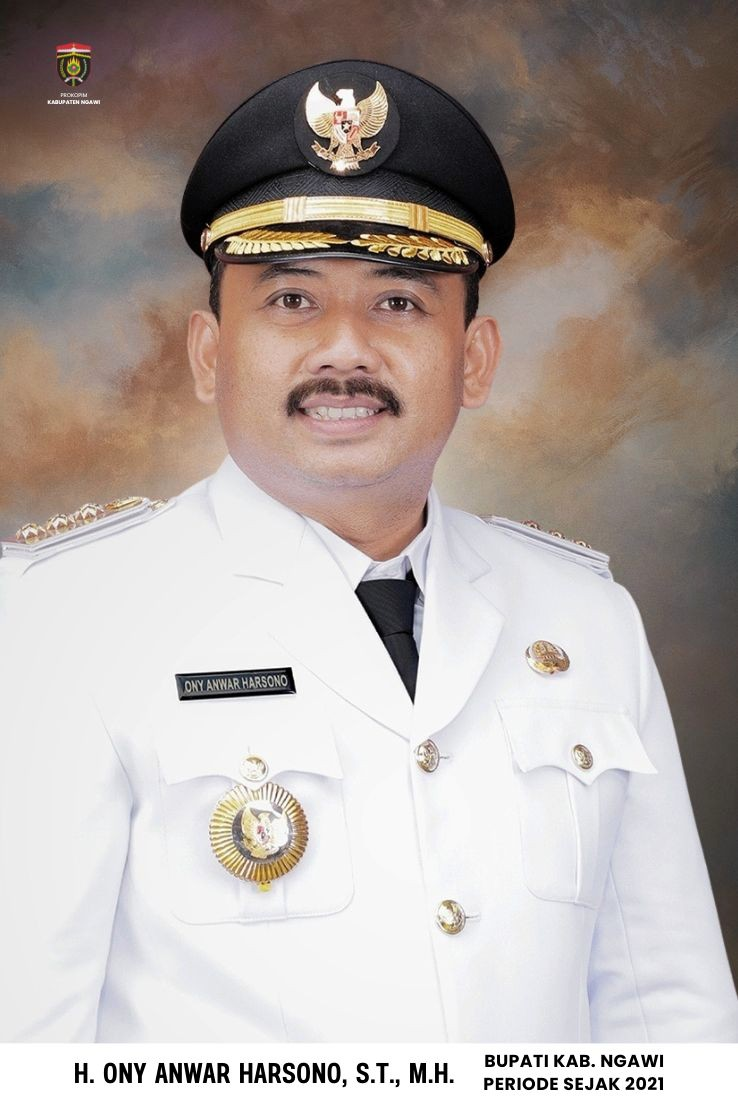

28th Regent of Ngawi
- Incumbent
- Assumed office February 26, 2021
- President: Joko Widodo
- Governor: Khofifah Indar Parawansa
- Vice of Regent: Dwi Rianto Jatmiko
- Preceded by: Budi Sulistyono
- Succeeded by: still in office

Vice of Regent
- In office July 27, 2010 – February 17, 2021
- President: Susilo Bambang Yudhoyono; Joko Widodo
- Governor: Soekarwo; Khofifah Indar Parawansa
- Regent: Budi Sulistyono
- Preceded by: Budi Sulistyono
- Succeeded by: Dwi Rianto Jatmiko

Personal details
- Born: December 15, 1979 (age 46) Ngawi, Indonesia
- Party: PDI-P
- Spouse: Ana Mursyida
- Children: 2
- Parent: Harsono
- Education: Universitas Islam Indonesia; Universitas Sebelas Maret
- Occupation: Businessman, Politician

Ony Anwar Harsono born December 15, 1979, is a regent of Ngawi elected who will return to office starting February 7, 2025. Previously, he served as Vice Regent in the 2010–2015 and 2016–2021 periods. He has a background as an entrepreneur and is the son of Harsono, the regent of Ngawi who served from 2000 to 2010 and was also the former head of the East Java Provincial Health Service.

== Early life and career ==
He is married to Ana Mursyida He is the son of the former regent of Ngawi for the 2000-2010 period, Harsono, who was the former head of the East Java Provincial Health Service.

== Political history ==
He served as Deputy Regent of Ngawi for two terms accompanying Budi Sulistyono in 2010 - 2015 and 2016 - 2020. In the 2020 Ngawi Regent Election, Ony Anwar ran with Dwi Rianto Jatmiko to advance as a candidate for Regent and Deputy Regent of Ngawi which is supported by all parties that have representatives in the Ngawi Regency Regional People's Representative Council.

In the 2020 Ngawi Regent Election, the Ony Antok pair managed to win the vote, defeating the Empty Box with a landslide victory of 94.4%. This victory led the Ony Antok pair to become the elected regent and deputy regent with the highest number of votes in the Simultaneous Regional Elections throughout East Java.

Before becoming the regent of Ngawi, he was offered by the Democratic Party as a running mate for Khofifah Indar Parawansa in the 2018 East Java gubernatorial election.

In the 2024 Ngawi Regent Election, he again ran as a candidate for Regent with Dwi Rianto Jatmiko. Both of them won again against empty box with 409,498 votes or 94.08%.
