= Trimarjono =

Indonesian naval officer, bureaucrat

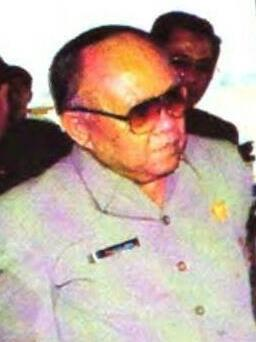
- Trimarjono in 1994

6th Speaker of the East Java Regional House of Representatives
- In office 1992–1997
- Governor: Soelarso; Basofi Sudirman
- Preceded by: Asri Subaryati Sunardi
- Succeeded by: Sutarmas

Vice Governor of East Java (Welfare Affairs)
- In office 25 May 1985 – 27 December 1990 Serving with Soeparmanto (until 1989) and Warsito Rasman (from 1990)
- Governor: Wahono; Soelarso
- Preceded by: Soeparmanto
- Succeeded by: Harwin Wasisto

Provincial Secretary of East Java
- In office February 1967 – 25 May 1985
- Governor: Mochammad Wijono; Mohammad Noer; Soenandar Prijosoedarmo; Wahono
- Preceded by: Juwono Asparin
- Succeeded by: Soeprapto

Personal details
- Born: April 14, 1933 Jogorogo, Ngawi, Dutch East Indies
- Died: February 5, 2010 (aged 76) Surabaya, East Java, Indonesia
- Party: Golkar
- Spouse: Harnani
- Children: 3
- Education: Gadjah Mada University (S.H.)

Military service
- Allegiance: Indonesia
- Branch/service: Indonesian Navy
- Years of service: 1963–1988
- Rank: First admiral
- Unit: Legal

Trimarjono (14 April 1933 – 5 February 2010) was an Indonesian naval officer, bureaucrat, and politician who served in the executive and legislative branch of East Java for a long period. He was the provincial secretary from 1967 until 1985, vice governor from 1985 until 1990, and the speaker of the People's Representative Council from 1992 until 1997.

== Early life ==
Trimarjono was born in Jogorogo, Ngawi, on 14 April 1933. He completed elementary school in Ngawi in 1944 and junior high school in Probolinggo in 1947. He then moved to Madiun, where he attended the teacher education school.

Upon graduating from the teacher education school in 1950, Trimarjono worked as a teacher at a local elementary school. He resumed his education in 1953 and attended a high school in Madiun. Trimarjono finished his secondary education in 1955 and began studying law at the Gadjah Mada University in Yogyakarta. He graduated from the university with a law degree in 1962.

== Career ==
Trimarjono joined the Indonesian Navy as an officer in the law corps after graduating from the university. He started his career as the secretary of the armed forces in the People's Representative Council. A year later, he became the personal secretary to People's Representative Council deputy speaker Mursalin Daeng Mamangung. He also became an assistant at the Maritime Consultative Assembly, an assembly which advises the government on maritime matters.

After serving for about three years in the People's Representative Council, Trimarjono returned to East Java, where he became an attorney in the local naval command in Semarang. During his brief stint in the naval command, Trimarjono established a daily newspaper for the naval command. Among its editors was future attorney general Sukarton Marmosudjono.

=== Provincial secretary ===
In February 1967, Trimarjono was appointed as the acting provincial secretary of East Java. Trimarjono, who at that time held the rank of major, replaced career bureaucrat Juwono Asparin. Juwono's dismissal was protested by members of the Nahdlatul Ulama in the East Java parliament, who had supported his appointment in 1964.

Trimarjono was immediately promoted to the rank of lieutenant colonel upon his appointment. His appointment as provincial secretary was made definitive around several years later and he received a rank promotion during this time. As the second highest position—prior to the formation of the vice governor—in the provincial government, Trimarjono became the acting governor of East Java for several times.

Trimarjono was known for standing in front of the governor's office lobby every morning. In order to keep up with his habit, he always arrived at work before four in the morning. Due to his habit, Trimarjono was nicknamed the dedemit (haunter), the macan (tiger), and the Joko Dolog (a popular Buddhist statue in East Java) of the governor's office. He also received the nickname Napoleon due to his physical appearance.

=== Vice governor ===
Around 1984, the governor nominated Trimarjono as the second vice governor of East Java alongside Soeparmanto. His nomination was approved by the local parliament and became the second vice governor on 25 May 1985. Despite being already installed, Trimarjono did not receive his task as second vice governor until June 1985, when the governor decided to assign him on matters related to social welfare. Accordingly, he was promoted to the rank of commodore on the same year. He officially retired from the military on 12 August 1988.

As vice governor, Trimarjono led efforts to combat the widespread pollution of East Java rivers by factories. In order to ensure that the factories comply with government environment standards, he would often call factory owners to a meeting and make sudden visits to the factories. Aside from these, Trimarjono traverse through East Javanese rivers to see the backsides of the factory, where he could see whether the factories have already installed the required treatment facilities. Factories who failed to comply were announced by the local press and continuous failure would result in force closure by the government.

The companies being pressured by Trimarjono would retaliate by bribing or threatening journalists and government officials in order not to expose their names. Factory owners who were supported by powerful politicians in the central government would seek help from them in order to prevent the local government from pressuring them. Pressures could also came from inside the bureaucracy, where lower level officials refused to implement the superior's instruction.

On one occasion, Trimarjono had to face the owner of a paper factory who was backed by president Soeharto. Trimarjono threatened him back by stating that if the factory did not comply, the authorities under him would not provide assistance. Eventually, after being taken to the court, the paper company installed the required waste management facility. According to Trimarjono, the factory "regarded him as a ‘saviour’ for forcing them to install proper pollution control equipment" and sponsored his biography after his retirement.

=== Regional parliament speaker ===
Trimarjono was replaced from his post as vice governor by Harwin Wasisto on 27 December 1990. He was elected to the East Java Regional People's Representative Council (the regional parliament) from Golkar in the 1992 Indonesian legislative election and became its speaker. During his tenure, Trimarjono promoted the existence of the speakers and deputy speaker of the parliament as a "servant" rather than a boss for the parliament members. He vehemently opposed the existence of an interparliamentary cooperation body, fearing it might isolate him from the inner workings of the parliament. He proposed a "problem-based approach" by utilizing commissions inside the parliament. However, his proposal was opposed by a majority of Golkar parliament members.

== Personal life ==
Trimarjono was married to Harnani and had three children. His wife won the record for the biggest human chess in Indonesia.

Trimarjono died at his house in Surabaya on 5 February 2010. Previously, Trimarjono had been treated repeatedly for heart complications. Vice President Jusuf Kalla, former governors Basofi Sudirman and Imam Utomo, as well as former minister and vice governor Saifullah Yusuf all paid their final respects to Trimarjono. He was interred at a public cemetery.
