= Tongas, Probolinggo =

Tongas
- District
- Interactive map of Tongas
- Country: Indonesia
- Province: East Java
- Regency: Probolinggo

Population (mid 2024)
  - Total: 70,332

Tongas is the westernmost coastal district (kecamatan) in Probolinggo Regency, East Java Province, Indonesia. Tongas provides access to Mount Bromo, and is also the main route to Surabaya, Malang, and other major cities from Banyuwangi, Jember, and Bali. Tongas district is also passed by a railway and has Bayeman Station located in Dungun Village.
