= Ngawi Regency =

Regency in Java, Indonesia

Ngawi Ngawi
- Regency
- Regency of Ngawi; Kabupaten Ngawi

Other transcription(s)
  - Javanese: Ngawì (Gêdrig) ڠاوي (Pégon) ꦔꦮꦶ (Hånåcåråkå)
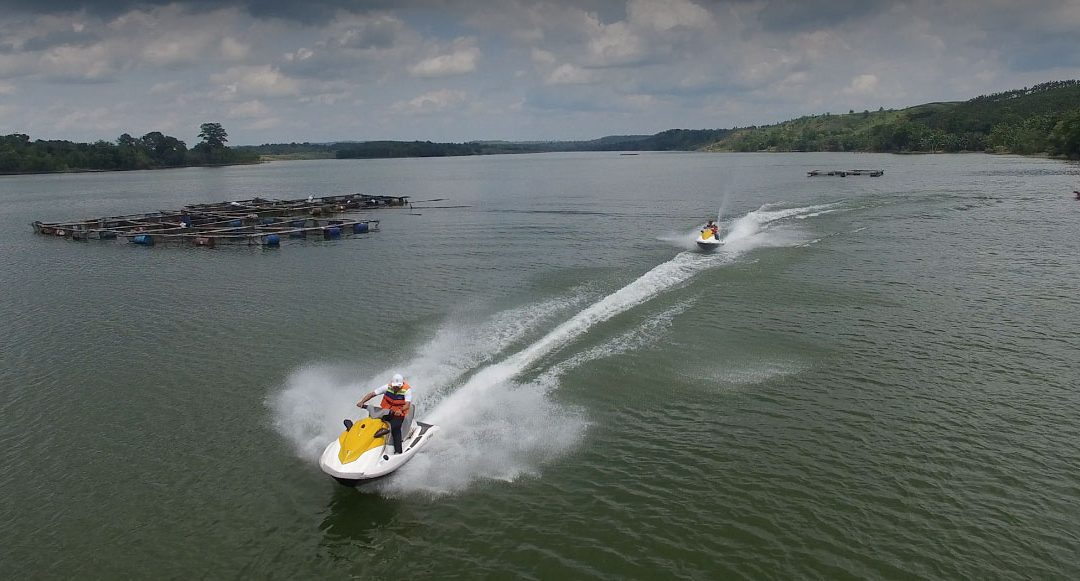
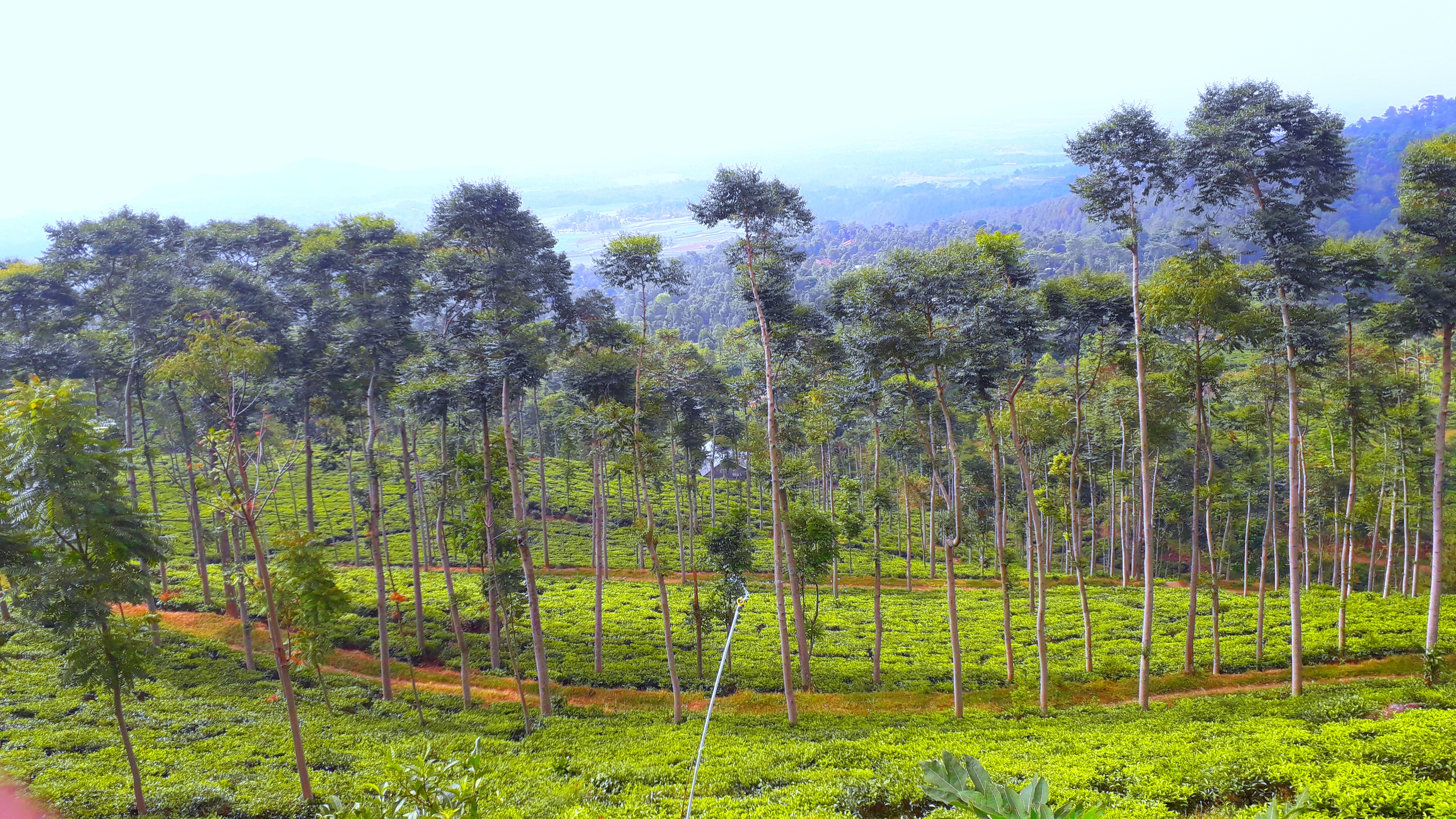
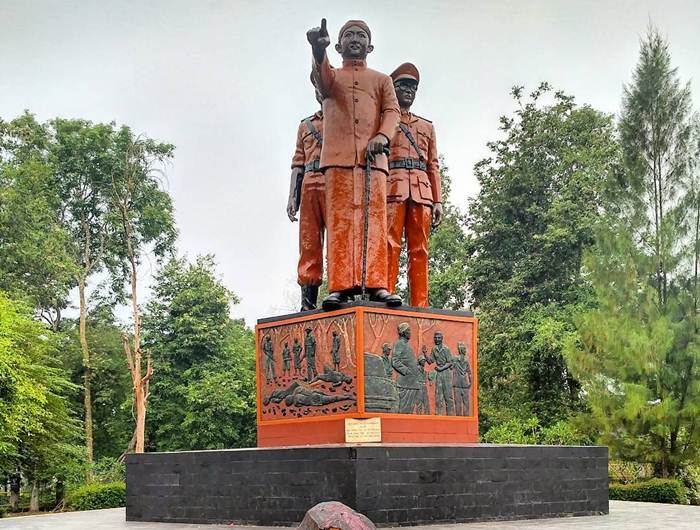
- From top, left to right: Pondok Reservoir, Jamus Tea Plantation in Sine, Soerjo monument statue in Widodaren town

- Coat of arms
- Nicknames: Ngawi Ramah • Benteng • Bambu; Friendly Ngawi • Fortress • Bamboo
- Motto: Negeri Ngawi Ramah; Friendly Ngawi Country
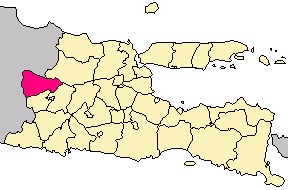
- Ngawi in East Java
- Interactive map of Ngawi
- Coordinates: 7°24′11″S 111°26′40.7″E
- Country: Indonesia
- Province: East Java
- Capital: Ngawi

Government
  - Body: Ngawi Regencies Government
  - Regent: Ony Anwar Harsono
  - Vice Regent: Dwi Rianto Jatmiko
  - Regional Secretary: Mokh. Sodiq Triwidiyanto
  - Speaker of the regional parliament: Yuwono Kartiko

Area
  - Total: 1,395.80 km^{2} (538.92 sq mi)
- Highest elevation: 3,156 m (10,354 ft)
- Lowest elevation: 47 m (154 ft)

Population (mid 2025 estimate)
  - Total: 911,093
  - Rank: 76th in Indonesia
  - Density: 652.739/km^{2} (1,690.59/sq mi)

Demographics
  - Ethnic groups: Javanese people Osing; Madura; Sundanese; Batak; Chinese; Others.
  - Religion: Islam 98,95%; Christianity 1,02 %; Protestantism 0,64%; Catholicism 0,38%; Hinduism 0,01%; Buddhism 0,01%; Others 0,01%
  - Languages: Indonesian (official); Javanese (dominant); Mataram dialect; Eastern Java dialect; Sundanese; Madura; Batak; Others.
- Time zone: UTC+07:00 (IWST)
- Postal code: 63211 – 63285
- Area code: (+62) 351
- ISO 3166 code: ID-NG
- Vehicle registration: AE J**/K**/L*/M*
- HDI: ▲0.72 (2022) (High)
- Website: ngawikab.go.id

Ngawi (Javanese: ꦏꦧꦸꦥꦠꦺꦤ꧀ꦔꦮꦶ) regency of Indonesia, on the island of Java. Ngawi is well known around the world for its Pithecanthropus erectus which was found by Eugene Dubois, a Dutchman. Ngawi is located in East Java Province but adjoins Central Java province. Its capital is the city of Ngawi. Ngawi is also the main gate to enter East Java province since there are intersections that connect Surabaya–Bojonegoro–Ngawi–Solo–Jogja–Bandung–Jakarta. The Regency covers an area of 1,395.80 km^{2} (538.92 sq mi), and had a population of 817,765 at the 2010 census and 870,057 at the 2020 census; the official estimate as at mid 2025 was 911,093 (comprising 452,166 males and 458,927 females).

Ngawi (town), has the largest central park ("alun-alun") in Indonesia. This large area includes a West Park and an East Park, separated by Merdeka Street. The West Park consists of a football court, a volleyball court, and a ceremonial podium near the main mosque. The East Park consists of a playground area, two tennis courts, a basketball hall, a parking area, a futsal court, a skating place, and a culinary area said to be "the most favorite place visited by Ngawinese". The municipal hall (called Alun-Alun Merdeka) is located in the central part of Ngawi town.

Van Den Bosch Fortress is a central historic site of the Ngawi Regency. It is located at the confluence of the two biggest rivers in East Java: the Solo River and the Madiun River.

== Climate ==
Ngawi has a monsoon tropical climate (Köppen climate classification Am), dry at mid-year, with heavy rain the rest of the year.

== Administrative districts ==
Ngawi Regency is divided into nineteen districts (kecamatan), tabulated below with their areas and their population totals from the 2010 census and the 2020 census, together with the official estimates as of mid 2025. The table also includes the locations of the district headquarters, the number of administrative villages in each district (totaling 213 rural desa and 4 urban kelurahan - the latter all in Ngawi (town) District), and its postcode.

Kode Wilayah	Name of District (kecamatan)	Area in km^{2}	Pop'n census 2010	Pop'n census 2020	Pop'n estimate mid 2025	Admin centre	No. of villages	Post code
35.21.01	Sine	81.49	41,096	44,681	47,330	Sine	15	63264
35.21.02	Ngrambe	67.64	38,750	42,267	44,710	Ngrambe	14	63263
35.21.03	Jogorogo	71.10	38,782	42,307	45,280	Jogorogo	12	63262
35.21.04	Kendal	87.04	44,242	50,055	53,810	Kendal	10	63261
35.21.05	Geneng	54.25	48,975	51,405	52,940	Geneng	13	63271
35.21.18	Gerih	33.84	32,118	36,114	38,410	Gerih	5	63270
35.21.06	Kwadungan	32.66	25,392	26,590	27,310	Kwadungan	14	63283
35.21.14	Pangkur	29.96	26,455	27,489	28,250	Pangkur	9	63282
35.21.07	Karangjati	70.83	46,927	47,427	48,280	Karangjati	17	63284
35.21.15	Bringin	67.77	30,554	30,917	32,280	Bringin	10	63285
35.21.08	Padas	42.32	32,231	34,136	35,430	Padas	12	63280
35.21.19	Kasreman	46.81	23,407	24,469	25,680	Kasreman	8	63281
35.21.09	Ngawi (town)	81.08	79,951	83,445	86,090	Karang Asri	16	63211: 63218
35.21.10	Paron	106.13	86,014	91,739	96,470	Gelung	14	63253
35.21.11	Kedunggalar	104.49	66,336	71,160	74,130	Kedunggalar	12	63254
35.21.16	Pitu	79.41	27,072	29,469	31,470	Pitu	10	63252
35.21.12	Widodaren	112.47	66,102	70,624	73,920	Walikukun	12	63256
35.21.13	Mantingan	68.75	37,885	38,142	38,360	Mantingan	7	63260
35.21.17	Karanganyar	157.77	25,476	27,621	30,950	Karanganyar	71	63257
	Totals	1,395.80	817,765	870,057	911,093	Ngawi	217	

== Trinil Site ==
=== Trinil Museum ===
Trinil Museum is about 15 kilometres from Ngawi (town) and near to the Bengawan Solo River. The museum contains a collection of about 1,500 fossils, some of which are a million years old. As of 2013 up to 500 fossils had yet to be identified. In the late 19th century Eugene Dubois found Pithecantropus eretus in the Trinil area.

=== Oldest human-made mark in the world ===
Researchers found in the Trinil site that the scratch at Pseudodon vondembuschianus trinilensis plain water clam shell aged 500,000 years is the oldest in the world. Although the scratch is perhaps not art, its zig-zag shape is evidence that the scratch is human-made. The clamshell has been found in 1896, but the zig-zag scratch was found in 2014.

== Notable people ==
- Achmadi Hadisoemarto, military officer and government minister under Suharto
- Agus Black Hoe Budianto, local businessman and 2024–2025 provincial legislator
- Agustinus Tri Budi Utomo, Roman Catholic Bishop of Surabaya
- Denny Caknan, singer and songwriter
- Didi Kempot, singer and songwriter
- Herlinatiens, novelist
- Mohamad Nasir, academic and government minister under Joko Widodo
- Soeparmanto, Governor of Central Kalimantan (1989–1994)
- Trimarjono, Vice Governor of East Java (1985–1990) and provincial legislator
- Umar Kayam, sociologist

== See also ==
- Districts of Ngawi
