= Pamekasan =

Pamekasan Mekkasân
- Town
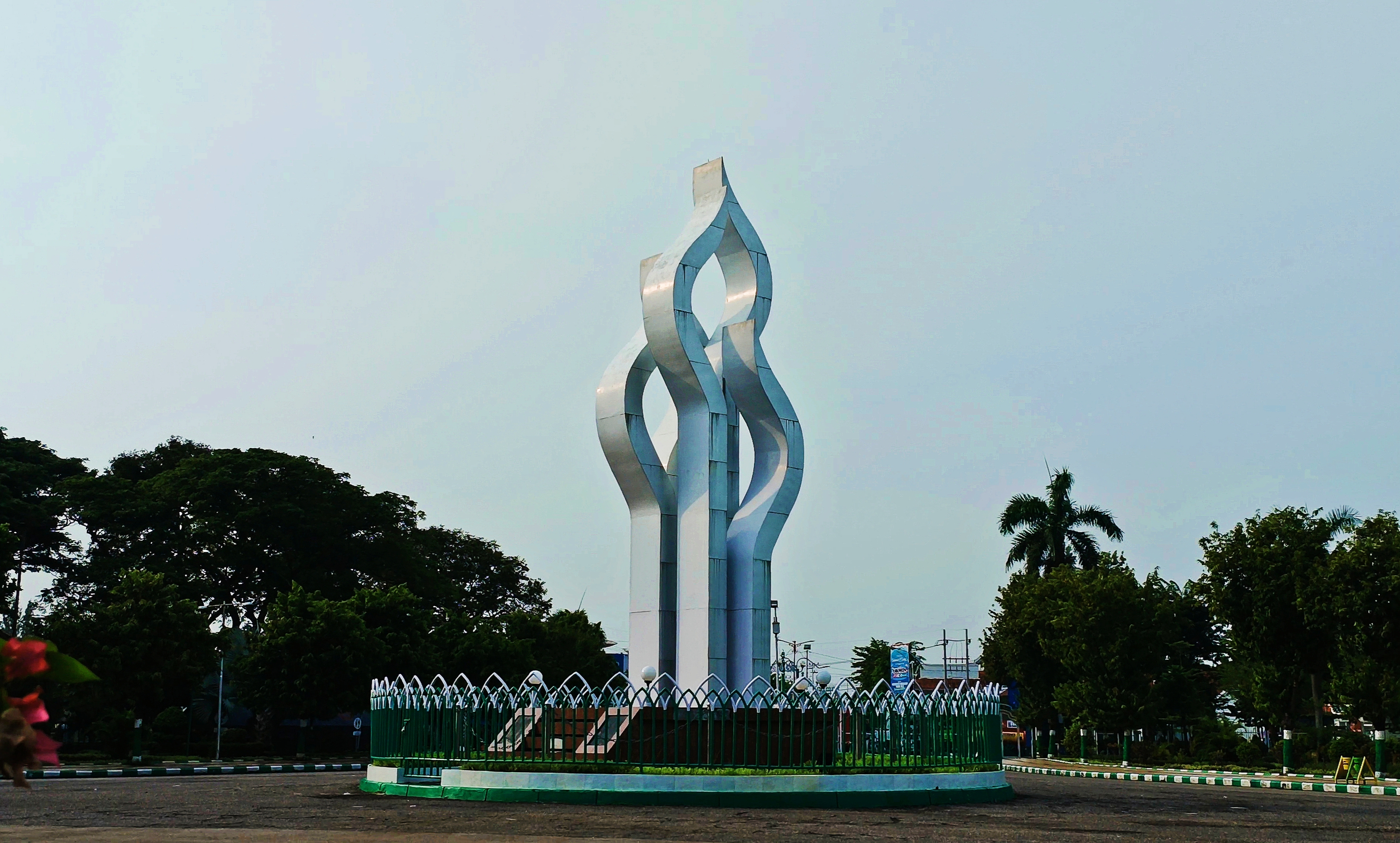
- Monument in Arek Lancor garden

- Location in Java and Indonesia Pamekasan (Indonesia)
- Coordinates: 7.157411°S 113.471789°E
- Country: Indonesia
- Province: East Java
- Regency: Pamekasan Regency

Area
  - Total: 26.47 km^{2} (10.22 sq mi)

Population (mid 2025 estimate)
  - Total: 93,126
  - Density: 3,518/km^{2} (9,112/sq mi)
- Time zone: UTC+7 (Indonesia Western Time)
- Postcodes: 69311,69312, 69314, 69316, 69317
- Area code: (+62) 324
- Villages: 18

Pamekasan (Madurese: Mekkasân) is a town and district which serves as the administrative center of Pamekasan Regency, East Java Province, Indonesia. It is located on the island of Madura, in an inland location towards the south coast of the island.

== Administrative villages ==
Pamekasan consists of 18 villages (Kelurahan or Desa) namely:

- Barurambat Kota *
- Bettet
- Bugih *
- East Teja (Teja Timur)
- Gladak Anyar *
- Jalmak
- Jungcangcang *
- Kangenan *
- Kolpajung *
- Kowel *
- Laden
- Nylabu Daya
- Nylabu Laok
- Panempan
- Parteker *
- Patemon *
- Toronan
- West Teja (Teja Barat)

Nine of the above (indicated by asterisks) are classed as urban (kelurahan) and nine as rural (desa).

== Climate ==
Pamekasan has a tropical savanna climate (Aw) with moderate to little rainfall from May to November and heavy rainfall from December to April.

Climate data for Pamekasan
Month	Jan	Feb	Mar	Apr	May	Jun	Jul	Aug	Sep	Oct	Nov	Dec	Year
Mean daily maximum °C (°F)	31.0 (87.8)	30.8 (87.4)	31.0 (87.8)	31.5 (88.7)	31.7 (89.1)	31.4 (88.5)	31.1 (88.0)	31.6 (88.9)	32.3 (90.1)	33.0 (91.4)	33.0 (91.4)	31.6 (88.9)	31.7 (89.0)
Daily mean °C (°F)	26.7 (80.1)	26.5 (79.7)	26.6 (79.9)	27.0 (80.6)	27.1 (80.8)	26.5 (79.7)	26.0 (78.8)	26.3 (79.3)	26.9 (80.4)	27.7 (81.9)	28.0 (82.4)	27.0 (80.6)	26.9 (80.4)
Mean daily minimum °C (°F)	22.4 (72.3)	22.3 (72.1)	22.3 (72.1)	22.6 (72.7)	22.5 (72.5)	21.7 (71.1)	21.0 (69.8)	21.1 (70.0)	21.6 (70.9)	22.5 (72.5)	23.0 (73.4)	22.5 (72.5)	22.1 (71.8)
Average rainfall mm (inches)	260 (10.2)	239 (9.4)	254 (10.0)	179 (7.0)	107 (4.2)	72 (2.8)	41 (1.6)	11 (0.4)	11 (0.4)	38 (1.5)	122 (4.8)	239 (9.4)	1,573 (61.7)
Source: Climate-Data.org
