= East Java Regional House of Representatives =

Unicameral legislature of the Indonesian province of East Java

East Java Province Regional House of Representatives Dewan Perwakilan Rakyat Daerah Provinsi Jawa Timur ꦝꦺꦮꦤ꧀ꦥꦼꦂꦮꦏꦶꦭꦤ꧀ꦫꦏꦾꦠ꧀ꦝꦲꦺꦫꦃꦥꦿꦺꦴ ꦮ꦳ꦶꦤ꧀ꦱꦶꦗꦮꦶꦮꦺꦠꦤ꧀
- 2024–2029 Period
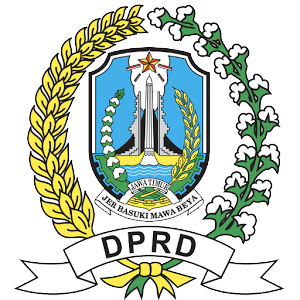

Type
- Type: Unicameral
- Term limits: 5 years

History
- Founded: 1950; 76 years ago
- New session started: 31 August 2024

Leadership
- Speaker: Muhammad Musyafak Rouf, PKB since 24 October 2024
- Deputy Speaker: Deni Wicaksono, PDI-P since 24 October 2024
- Deputy Speaker: Hidayat, Gerindra since 24 October 2024
- Deputy Speaker: Blegur Prijanggono, Golkar since 24 October 2024
- Deputy Speaker: Sri Wahyuni, Democratic since 24 October 2024

Structure
- Seats: 120
- Political groups: Government (72): Gerindra (21); Golkar (15); Democratic (11); NasDem (10); PAN (5); PKS (5); PPP (4); PSI (1); Opposition (48): PKB (27); PDI-P (21)

Elections
- Voting system: Open list proportional representation
- Last election: 14 February 2024
- Next election: 2029

Meeting place
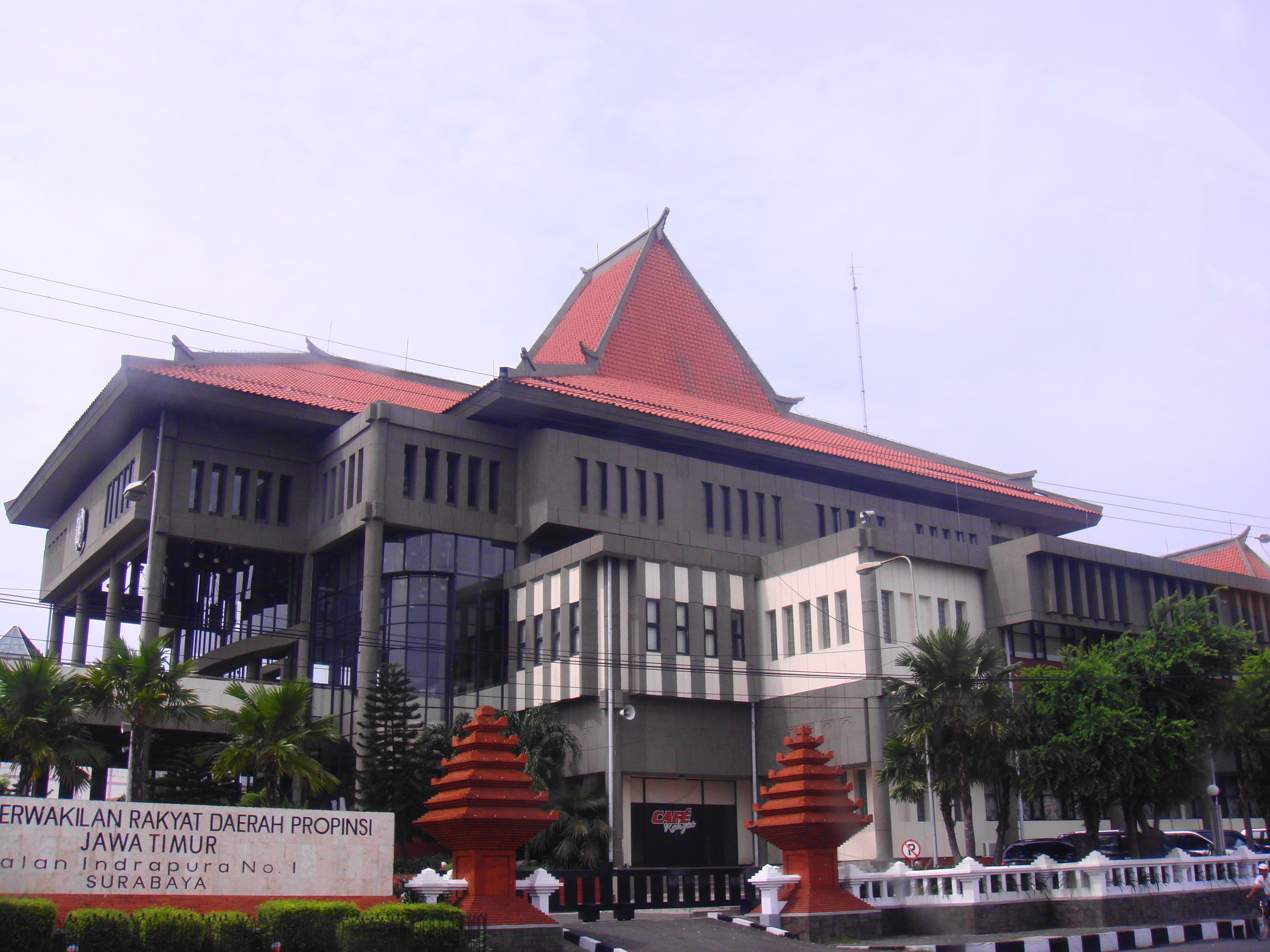
- East Java Provincial DPRD Building, Jalan Indrapura No. 1, Surabaya, East Java, Indonesia

Website
- dprd.jatimprov.go.id

The East Java Regional House of Representatives (Indonesian: Dewan Perwakilan Rakyat Daerah Provinsi Jawa Timur; Javanese: ꦝꦺꦮꦤ꧀ꦥꦼꦂꦮꦏꦶꦭꦤ꧀ꦫꦏꦾꦠ꧀ꦝꦲꦺꦫꦃꦥꦿꦺꦴꦮ꦳ꦶꦤ꧀ꦱꦶꦗꦮꦶꦮꦺꦠꦤ꧀, romanized: Dhéwan Pěrwakilan Rakyat Dhaérah Provinsi Jawi Wetan; Madurese: ꦣꦮꦤ꧀ꦥꦼꦂꦮꦏꦺꦭꦤ꧀ꦫ'ꦪꦠ꧀ꦝꦌꦫꦃꦥꦿꦺꦴꦥꦺꦤ꧀ꦱꦶꦗꦧꦠꦺꦩꦺꦴꦂ, romanized: Dhâwan Pěrwakèlan Ra'yat Dâerah Propènsi Jhâbâ Tèmor, abbreviated to DPRD Jatim) is the unicameral legislature of the Indonesian province of East Java. Consisting of 120 people from the political parties with the most votes and elected every five years together with the national legislative election.

== General election results ==
=== 2024 Indonesian legislative election ===
The official valid votes received by political parties contesting the 2024 Indonesian legislative election in each electoral district (constituency) for the East Java Provincial DPRD are as follows.

2024 Indonesian legislative election results

Electoral district	PKB	Gerindra	PDI-P	Golkar	NasDem	Labour	Gelora	PKS	PKN	Hanura	Garuda	PAN	PBB	Democratic	PSI	Perindo	PPP	Ummat	Valid votes
East Java 1	193,698	261,974	298,050	102,527	48,056	14,824	9,431	136,075	3,102	7,948	5,379	73,787	4,006	99,682	129,465	42,231	27,845	9,869	1,467,949
East Java 2	260,879	203,465	114,711	93,047	30,003	12,505	7,649	56,378	1,117	3,641	3,766	83,676	2,149	86,088	56,929	9,973	15,636	8,615	1,050,227
East Java 3	391,351	347,278	169,062	193,594	140,422	20,604	20,298	82,322	2,115	9,209	3,650	66,654	2,980	120,326	28,748	8,149	82,812	4,003	1,693,577
East Java 4	411,859	329,166	235,531	180,176	67,853	6,503	20,951	54,612	2,689	10,004	4,722	37,104	5,745	131,493	27,421	7,301	165,646	6,814	1,705,590
East Java 5	340,683	494,479	261,104	253,481	112,802	6,621	11,437	162,518	1,414	3,549	4,415	49,012	4,284	60,426	31,264	27,713	124,035	7,241	1,956,478
East Java 6	373,458	340,405	499,481	189,837	101,415	13,128	20,929	181,611	2,862	6,972	8,667	51,018	3,187	92,798	77,460	15,851	83,903	5,959	2,068,941
East Java 7	274,079	212,548	314,565	140,349	72,502	5,280	10,010	32,597	27,090	5,999	3,177	119,166	2,484	55,110	41,373	5,230	22,899	2,196	1,346,654
East Java 8	148,196	129,175	188,762	117,251	134,137	4,270	5,213	24,633	1,644	4,024	2,050	194,200	2,037	70,577	24,431	5,534	9,657	5,519	1,071,310
East Java 9	344,915	269,059	413,162	183,795	157,811	7,381	37,472	159,163	1,798	14,604	4,457	105,148	3,409	380,910	24,651	6,415	20,627	3,741	2,138,518
East Java 10	277,670	255,755	207,216	99,817	175,445	7,533	7,063	80,817	1,875	5,996	3,164	82,737	4,054	147,145	26,646	10,251	69,901	6,374	1,469,459
East Java 11	226,950	175,892	212,434	113,577	114,938	5,642	7,941	39,114	1,693	16,958	2,269	41,887	1,325	73,197	34,225	18,363	7,727	1,847	1,095,979
East Java 12	368,040	179,699	109,825	286,702	34,300	6,030	9,024	62,215	3,374	6,042	4,562	80,394	9,631	132,757	17,399	4,349	68,568	3,531	1,386,442
East Java 13	361,472	205,525	219,453	131,958	95,809	10,352	5,890	30,624	916	2,732	2,305	155,642	3,543	84,459	29,324	4,978	80,457	12,779	1,438,218
East Java 14	543,978	184,632	492,509	228,574	534,718	1,106	2,619	204,978	255	1,530	550	179,138	42,126	337,385	1,715	21,556	198,295	1,131	2,976,795
Total	4,517,228	3,589,052	3,735,865	2,314,685	1,820,211	121,779	175,927	1,307,657	51,944	99,208	53,133	1,319,563	90,960	1,872,353	551,051	187,894	978,008	79,619	22,866,137
Source: General Elections Commission of Indonesia

== Composition ==
Party	Total seats				
Party	2004–2009	2009–2014	2014–2019	2019–2024	2024–2029
PKB seats	31	▼13	▲20	▲25	▲27
Gerindra seats		8	▲13	▲15	▲21
PDI-P seats	24	▼17	▲19	▲27	▼21
Golkar seats	15	▼11	11	▲13	▲15
NasDem seats			4	▲9	▲10
PKS seats	3	▲7	▼6	▼4	▲5
PPP seats	8	▼4	▲5	5	▼4
Hanura seats		4	▼2	▼1	▼0
PAN seats	7	7	7	▼6	▼5
Demokrat seats	10	▲22	▼13	▲14	▼11
PSI seats				0	▲1
PBB seats	1	▼0	0	▲1	▼0
PDS seats	1	1			
PBR seats	0	▲1			
PKNU seats		5			
Total Seats	100	100	100	▲120	120
Total Party	9	▲12	▼10	▲11	▼10

== Parliamentary groups ==
=== Factions ===
Faction is a forum for DPRD members to gather in order to optimize the implementation of the functions, duties, and authorities as well as the rights and obligations of the DPRD. Each faction has at least the same number of members as the number of commissions in the DPRD. One faction in the East Java DPRD has at least 5 members.

The East Java DPRD for the 2019–2024 period consists of 9 factions as follows:

Faction	Member Parties	Chairman	Number of Members
Indonesian Democratic Party of Struggle Faction	PDI-P	Sri Untari Bisowarno	27
National Awakening Party Faction	PKB	Anik Maslachah (August 31-October 23, 2019); Fauzan Fu'adi (October 23, 2019-present)	25
Great Indonesia Movement Party Faction	Gerindra	Ahmad Hadinuddin	15
Democratic Party Faction	Democratic	Sri Subianti	14
Golkar Party Faction	Golkar	Sahat Tua Parlindungan Simandjuntak	13
National Democratic Party Faction	NasDem	Muzamil Syafi’i	9
National Mandate Party Faction	PAN	A. Basuki Babussalam	6
United Development Party Faction	PPP	Musyafa Noer	5
Just-Star-Conscience Faction	PKS; PBB; Hanura	Arif Hari Setiawan	6

== Structure ==
Based on Article 110 of the Law of the Republic of Indonesia Number 23 of 2014 concerning Regional Government, the Provincial DPRD's Supporting Apparatus (AKD) consists of:

1. Leadership
2. Deliberative Body (Bamus)
3. Commission
4. Regional Regulation Formation Body (Bapemperda)
5. Budget Agency (Banggar)
6. Honorary Council (BK)
7. Other Supporting Apparatus (formed through a Plenary Meeting)

=== Leadership ===
According to laws and regulations, the Provincial DPRD which has members: 35-44 people led by 1 speaker and 2 deputy speaker; 45-84 people led by 1 speaker and 3 deputy speaker; and 85-100 people led by 1 speaker and 4 deputy speaker. The leadership of the East Java DPRD consists of 1 Speaker and 4 Deputy Speaker who come from the political party that won the most seats and votes in sequence. The following is a list of Speaker of the East Java DPRD since 1957.

Serial number	DPRD Speaker	Political Party	Started Serving	Ended Serving	DPRD Period	Description
1	R. Soebandi	unknown	1957	1960	1955–1960	DPRD results 1955 Election
2	Mochamad Wijono	unknown	1960	1965	1960–1971	Speaker of the DPR-GR of East Java
3	Mochammad Said	unknown	1965	1971	1960–1971	Speaker of the DPR-GR of East Java
3	Mochammad Said	unknown	1971	1975	1971–1977	Results of 1971 Election
4	Blegoh Soemarto	unknown	1975	1977	1971–1977	Results of 1971 Election
4	Blegoh Soemarto	unknown	1977	1982	1977–1982	Results of 1977 Election
4	Blegoh Soemarto	unknown	1982	1987	1982–1987	Results of 1982 Election
5	Asri Soebarjati Soenardi	unknown	1987	1992	1987–1992	Results of 1987 election
6	Trimarjono	Golkar	1992	1997	1992–1997	Results of 1992 election
7	Sutarmas	unknown	1997	1999	1997–1999	Results of 1997 Election
8	Bisjrie Abdul Djalil	PKB	1999	2004	1999–2004	Results of 1999 Election
9	Fathorrasjid	PKB	August 2004	February 2009	2004–2009	Results of 2004 Election
—	Suhartono (Acting.)	PKS	February 2009	June 2009	2004–2009	Results of 2004 Election
10	Djafar Shodiq	PKB	June 2009	August 2009	2004–2009	Results of 2004 Election
11	Imam Sunardhi	Democratic	August 2009	August 2014	2009–2014	Results of 2009 Election
12	Abdul Halim Iskandar	PKB	August 2014	August 2019	2014–2019	Results of 2014 Election
13	Kusnadi	PDI-P	August 2019	August 2024	2019–2024	Hasil 2019 Election
14	Muhammad Musyafak Rouf	PKB	August 2024	Incumbent	2024–2029	Hasil 2024 Election

=== Commissions ===
According to the provisions of the law, the Provincial DPRD with 35-55 members can form 4 commissions and the Provincial DPRD with more than 55 members can form 5 commissions. The East Java DPRD consists of 5 commissions as follows:

- Commission A (Government Sector)
- Commission B (Economic Sector)
- Commission C (Finance Sector)
- Commission D (Development Sector)
- Commission E (Public Welfare Sector)

== Electoral districts ==
Name Electoral	Electoral District	Total Seats
EAST JAVA 1	Surabaya	8
EAST JAVA 2	Sidoarjo Regency	6
EAST JAVA 3	Probolinggo Regency, Pasuruan Regency, Probolinggo, Pasuruan	9
EAST JAVA 4	Banyuwangi Regency, Bondowoso Regency, Situbondo Regency	9
EAST JAVA 5	Jember Regency, Lumajang Regency	11
EAST JAVA 6	Malang Regency, Malang, Batu	11
EAST JAVA 7	Blitar Regency, Blitar, Tulungagung Regency	7
EAST JAVA 8	Kediri, Kediri Regency	6
EAST JAVA 9	Ngawi Regency, Ponorogo Regency, Trenggalek Regency, Pacitan Regency, Magetan Regency	12
EAST JAVA 10	Mojokerto Regency, Jombang Regency, Mojokerto	8
EAST JAVA 11	Madiun Regency, Madiun, Nganjuk Regency	6
EAST JAVA 12	Bojonegoro Regency, Tuban Regency	7
EAST JAVA 13	Lamongan Regency, Gresik Regency	8
EAST JAVA 14	Bangkalan Regency, Pamekasan Regency, Sampang Regency, Sumenep Regency	12
TOTAL		120

== Speakers ==
No.	Period	Speaker
1	1955–1960	R. Soebandi
2	1960–1971	Mochamad Wijono
3	1960–1971	Mochammad Said
4	1971–1977	Mochammad Said
5	1971–1977	Blegoh Soemarto
6	1977–1982	Blegoh Soemarto
7	1982–1987	Blegoh Soemarto
8	1987–1992	Asri Soebarjati Soenardi
9	1992–1997	Trimarjono
10	1997–1999	Sutarmas
11	1999–2004	Bisjrie Abdul Djalil
12	2004–2009	Fathorrasjid
13	2004–2009	Djafar Shodiq
—	2009	Suhartono (interim)
14	2009–2014	Imam Sunardhi
15	2014–2019	Abdul Halim Iskandar
16	2019–2024	Kusnadi
17	2024–2029	Muhammad Musyafak Rouf

== See also ==
- Regional House of Representatives
