= Kraksaan =

- Location in East Java and Indonesia Kraksaan (Indonesia)
- Coordinates: 7°45′38″S 113°24′59″E
- Country: Indonesia
- Province: East Java
- Regency: Probolinggo Regency
- District: Kraksaan District

Area
  - Total: 14.59 sq mi (37.80 km^{2})
- Elevation: 30 ft (9 m)

Population (mid 2025estimate)
  - Total: 71,679
  - Density: 4,911/sq mi (1,896/km^{2})
- Time zone: UTC+7 (Indonesia Western Standard Time)

Kraksaan is a town, administrative district and the regency seat of Probolinggo Regency, East Java, Indonesia. Its population was 65,590 at the Census of 2010 and 68,146 at the 2020 Census; the official estimate as at mid 2025 was 71,679.

== Climate ==
Kraksaan has a tropical savanna climate (Aw) with moderate to little rainfall from April to November and heavy rainfall from December to March.

Climate data for Kraksaan
Month	Jan	Feb	Mar	Apr	May	Jun	Jul	Aug	Sep	Oct	Nov	Dec	Year
Mean daily maximum °C (°F)	32.0 (89.6)	31.8 (89.2)	31.9 (89.4)	32.1 (89.8)	31.9 (89.4)	31.8 (89.2)	31.8 (89.2)	32.4 (90.3)	33.2 (91.8)	33.7 (92.7)	33.4 (92.1)	32.5 (90.5)	32.4 (90.3)
Daily mean °C (°F)	27.0 (80.6)	26.8 (80.2)	26.8 (80.2)	26.9 (80.4)	26.3 (79.3)	25.7 (78.3)	25.2 (77.4)	25.7 (78.3)	26.3 (79.3)	27.1 (80.8)	27.4 (81.3)	27.1 (80.8)	26.5 (79.7)
Mean daily minimum °C (°F)	22.0 (71.6)	21.9 (71.4)	21.8 (71.2)	21.7 (71.1)	20.8 (69.4)	19.7 (67.5)	18.6 (65.5)	19.0 (66.2)	19.5 (67.1)	20.6 (69.1)	21.5 (70.7)	21.7 (71.1)	20.7 (69.3)
Average rainfall mm (inches)	284 (11.2)	261 (10.3)	225 (8.9)	94 (3.7)	83 (3.3)	33 (1.3)	26 (1.0)	10 (0.4)	10 (0.4)	23 (0.9)	88 (3.5)	185 (7.3)	1,322 (52.2)
Source: Climate-Data.org
