= Pamekasan Regency =

Regency in East Java, Indonesia

Pamekasan Regency Kabupaten Pamekasan
- Regency

Regional transcription(s)
  - Madurese: Mekkasân (Latèn) مۤكّاسۤان (Pèghu) ꦩꦼꦏ꧀ꦏꦱꦤ꧀ (Carakan)
  - Javanese: Pawêkasan (Gêdrig) ڤاوۤكاسان (Pégon) ꦥꦮꦼꦏꦱꦤ꧀ (Hånåcåråkå)
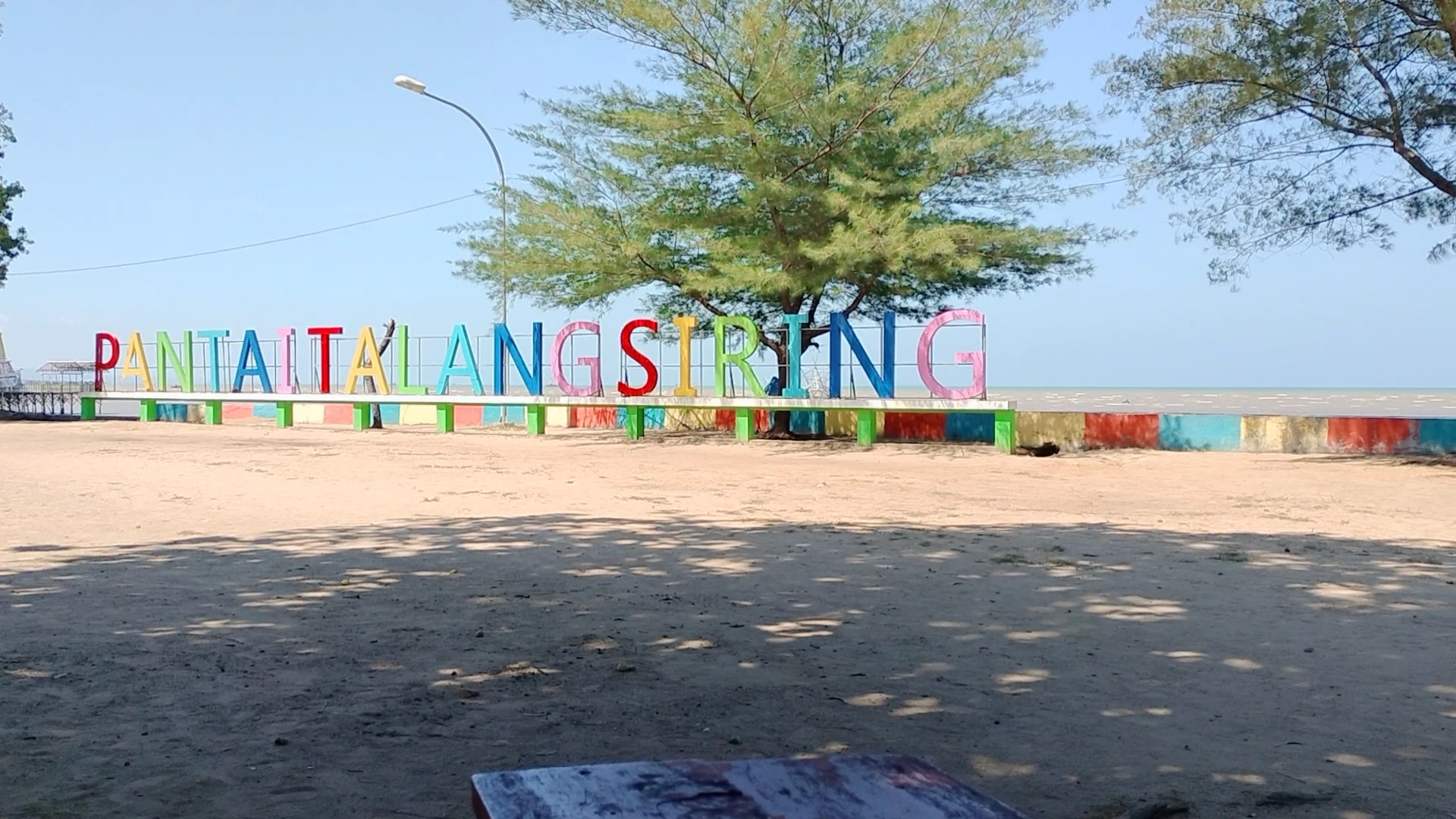
- Talang Siring Beach

- Seal
- Mottoes: Madu Ganda Mangesti Tunggal (Fragrant island, goes along with the unitary state); Mekkas Jatna Paksa Jenneng Dibi' (Governed by self-ability and people's support)
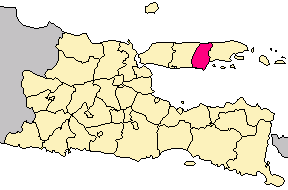
- Location within East Java

- Location in Java and Indonesia Pamekasan Regency (Indonesia)
- Coordinates: 7°10′S 113°28′E
- Country: Indonesia
- Province: East Java
- Capital: Pamekasan

Government
  - Regent: Kholilurrahman
  - Vice Regent: Sukriyanto

Area
  - Total: 792.30 km^{2} (305.91 sq mi)

Population (mid 2025 estimate)
  - Total: 919,433
  - Density: 1,160.5/km^{2} (3,005.6/sq mi)
- Area code: (+62) 324
- Website: pamekasankab.go.id

Pamekasan Regency (Madurese: Kabhupatèn Mekkasân) is a regency (kabupaten) of the province of East Java, Indonesia. It is located on Madura Island approximately 120 kilometres (75 mi) east of Surabaya, the provincial capital. The regency covers an area of 792.30 square kilometres (305.91 sq mi), and at the 2010 census it had a population of 795,918 (an increase from 689,225 at the previous census in 2000); at the 2020 census the total was 850,057 and the official estimate as at mid 2025 was 919,433 (comprising 449,958 males and 469,475 females). The administrative capital is the town of Pamekasan.

== Neighbouring Regencies ==
Pamekasan Regency is bordered on the east by Sumenep Regency, on the north by the Java Sea, on the west by Sampang Regency, and the south by the Madura Strait (separating Madura from the island of Java).

== Administrative districts ==
Pamekasan Regency consists of thirteen districts (kecamatan), tabulated below with their areas and their populations at the 2010 census and the 2020 census, together with the official estimates as at mid 2025. The table also includes the locations of the district administrative centres, the number of administrative villages in each district (totaling 178 rural desa and 11 urban kelurahan), and its postcode.

Kode Wilayah	Name of District (kecamatan)	Area in km^{2}	Pop'n 2010 census	Pop'n 2020 census	Pop'n mid 2025 estimate	Admin centre	No. of villages	Post code
35.28.01	Tlanakanan	48.10	59,156	64,122	69,043	Branta Tinggi	17	69371
35.28.02	Pademawu	71.90	76,713	84,803	89,272	Bunder	22 ^{(a)}	69321 -60323
35.28.03	Galis	31.86	28,235	29,770	31,741	Galis	10	69382
35.28.08	Larangan	40.86	53,174	56,553	60,452	Larangan Luar	14	69383
35.28.04	Pamekasan (district)	26.47	89,103	89,017	93,126	Patemon	18 ^{(b)}	69311 -69317
35.28.05	Proppo	71.49	75,079	84,864	95,302	Proppo	27	69363
35.28.06	Palengaan	88.48	85,246	82,600	90,739	Palengaan Laok	12	69362
35.28.07	Pegantenan	86.04	63,014	73,686	81,481	Pegantenan	13	69361
35.28.12	Kadur	52.43	44,622	47,959	51,958	Kadur	10	69355
35.28.09	Pakong	30.71	34,429	36,817	39,554	Pakong	12	69352
35.28.10	Waru	70.03	59,346	64,394	71,550	Waru Barat	12	69353
35.28.11	Batumarmar	97.05	77,653	79,519	83,922	Tamberu	13	69354
35.28.13	Pasean	76.88	50,148	55,953	61,294	Tlontoraja	9	69356
	Totals	792.30	795,918	850,057	919,433	Pamekasan	189	

Notes: (a) including 2 kelurahan – Barurambat Timur and Lawangan Daya.
(b) comprising 9 kelurahan – see Pamekasan - (Kangenan, Patemon, Bugih, Jungcang Cang, Parteker, Barurambat Kota, Gladak Anyar, Kolpajung and Kowel) and 9 desa.

== Demographics ==
The population comprises Madurese, Javanese, and Chinese Indonesians.

== Economy ==
One of the famous produces from this region is Batik Pamekasan.
