= Probolinggo Regency =

Regency in East Java, Indonesia

Probolinggo Regency Kabupaten Probolinggo
- Regency

Regional transcription(s)
  - Madurese: Prabâlingghâ (Latèn) ڤرابۤاليڠک࣭ۤا (Pèghu) ꦦꦿꦧꦭꦶꦁꦒ (Carakan)
  - Javanese: Pråbålinggå (Gêdrig) ڤراباليڠڮا (Pégon) ꦥꦿꦧꦭꦶꦁꦒ (Hånåcåråkå)
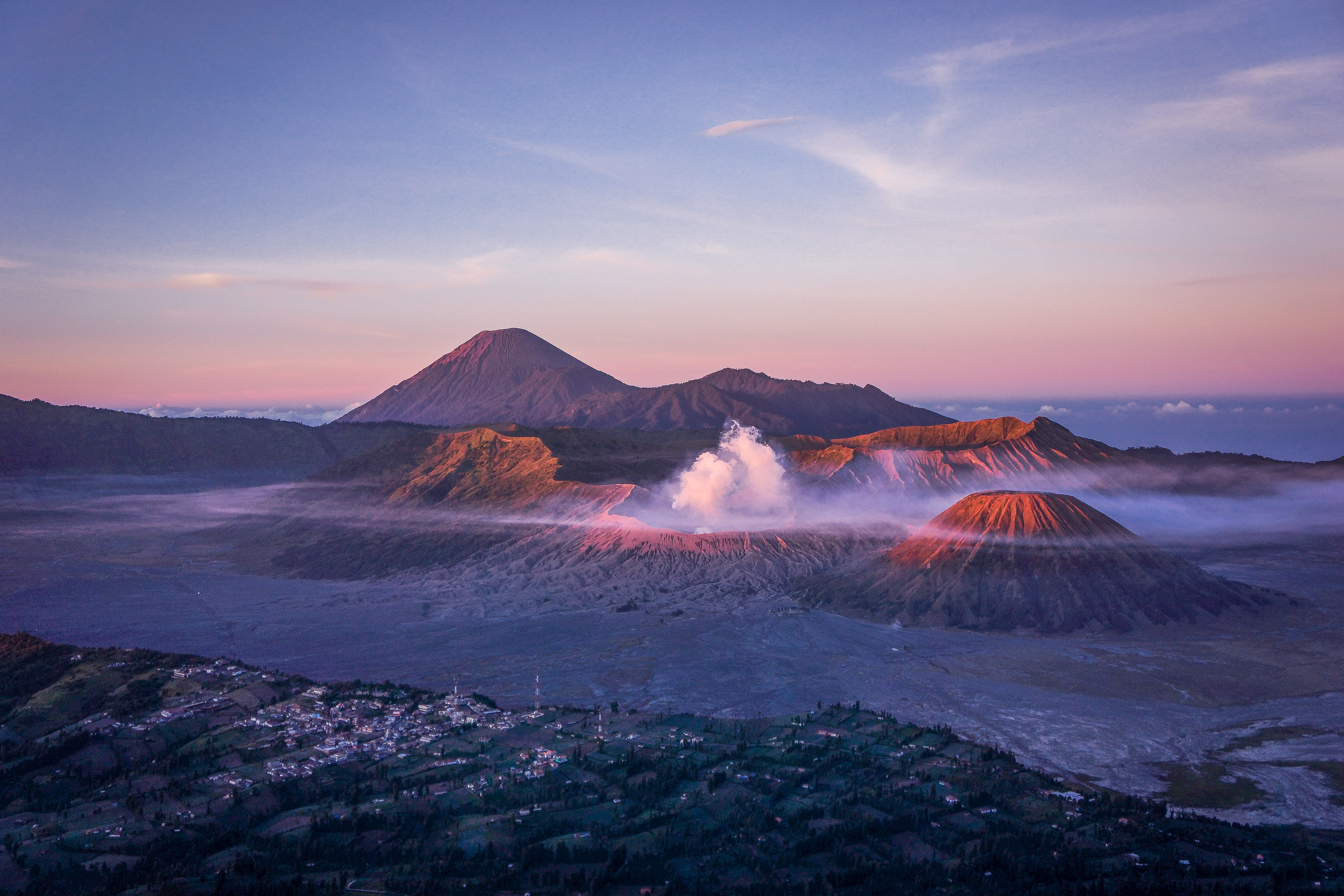
- Mount Bromo

- Coat of arms
- Motto: Prasaja Ngesti Wibawa ꦥꦿꦱꦗꦔꦺꦱ꧀ꦠꦶꦮꦶꦧꦮ (By modesty for the sake of dignity)
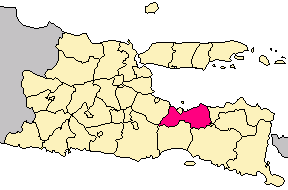
- Location within East Java

- Location in Java and Indonesia Probolinggo Regency (Indonesia)
- Coordinates: 7°44′07″S 113°28′18″E
- Country: Indonesia
- Province: East Java
- Anniversary: 18 April 1746
- Capital: Kraksaan

Government
  - Regent: Muhammad Haris Damanhuri Romly
  - Vice Regent: Fahmi Abdul Haq Zaini

Area
  - Total: 1,696.17 km^{2} (654.89 sq mi)

Population (mid 2025 estimate)
  - Total: 1,217,934
  - Density: 718.049/km^{2} (1,859.74/sq mi)
- Time zone: UTC+7 (IWST)
- Area code: (+62) 335
- Website: probolinggokab.go.id

Probolinggo Regency (Javanese: ꦏꦧꦸꦥꦠꦺꦤ꧀ꦥꦿꦧꦭꦶꦁꦒ, romanized: Kabupatèn Prabalingga) is a regency in the East Java province of Indonesia. It covers an area of 1,696.17 sq. km, and had a population of 1,096,244 at the 2010 Census and 1,152,537 at the 2020 Census; the official estimate as at mid 2025 was 1,217,934 (comprising 600,818 males and 617,116 females). Its capital was formerly the city of Probolinggo, but, following that city becoming an independent administrative entity, the regency capital was moved and is now at the town of Kraksaan.

== History ==
=== Indonesian National Revolution ===
The Dutch marines landed in Situbondo on 21 July 1947. They did not meet much resistance from Indonesian forces. Some of them headed west to attacked Probolinggo from the east of the regency. At 16.15 on the same day, the forces supported by armored vehicles already arrived at Kraksaan. At 17.30, they already held the downtown area. On 22 July morning, the Dutch seized the port of the city. They then set up perimeter near the railway, but met heavy resistance there. At night, Indonesian forces launched a counter-attack that made the Dutch forces pulled back to the port area. On 23 July, the Dutch launched an attack in Ledok Ombo village killing 15 soldiers of Indonesian forces.

Indonesian forces launched small scale attacks to the Dutch defensive posts until early August. They also conducted scorched earth strategy to prevent the Dutch forces utilizing Indonesian facilities and food supply.

== Government ==
The administration of Probolinggo city (kota) and Probolinggo regency (kabupaten) has repeatedly been separated and merged. There was a separation of government of Probolinggo city (kotapraja) and the regency based on Ordonantie dated 20 June 1918. Then, according on Ordonantie of 9 August 1928, the city was abolished and the area was merged again into the regency.

Under the Japanese occupation, the administrations were once again separated. The city (under Japanese rule, the level was called shi) mayor (shico) was Gapar Wiryosudibyo, a middle school teacher, while the regency (ken) regent was Nyais Wiryosubroto. Both Probolinggo (shi and ken) were under an administration of Malang-shu (residency).

During the National Revolution, on 13 August 1948 the city was abolished again and was absorbed into the regency. Then, after the Dutch recognition of Indonesian independence, the city and regency were separated again.

== Administrative districts ==
=== Late Dutch East Indies era ===
In late Dutch East Indies rule, there were 3 districts in Probolinggo Regency: Probolinggo, Tongas, and Sukapura. Probolinggo District itself was divided into 5 onderdistriks namely Probolinggo, Kanigaran, Wonoasih, Bantaran, and Leces.

=== Current ===
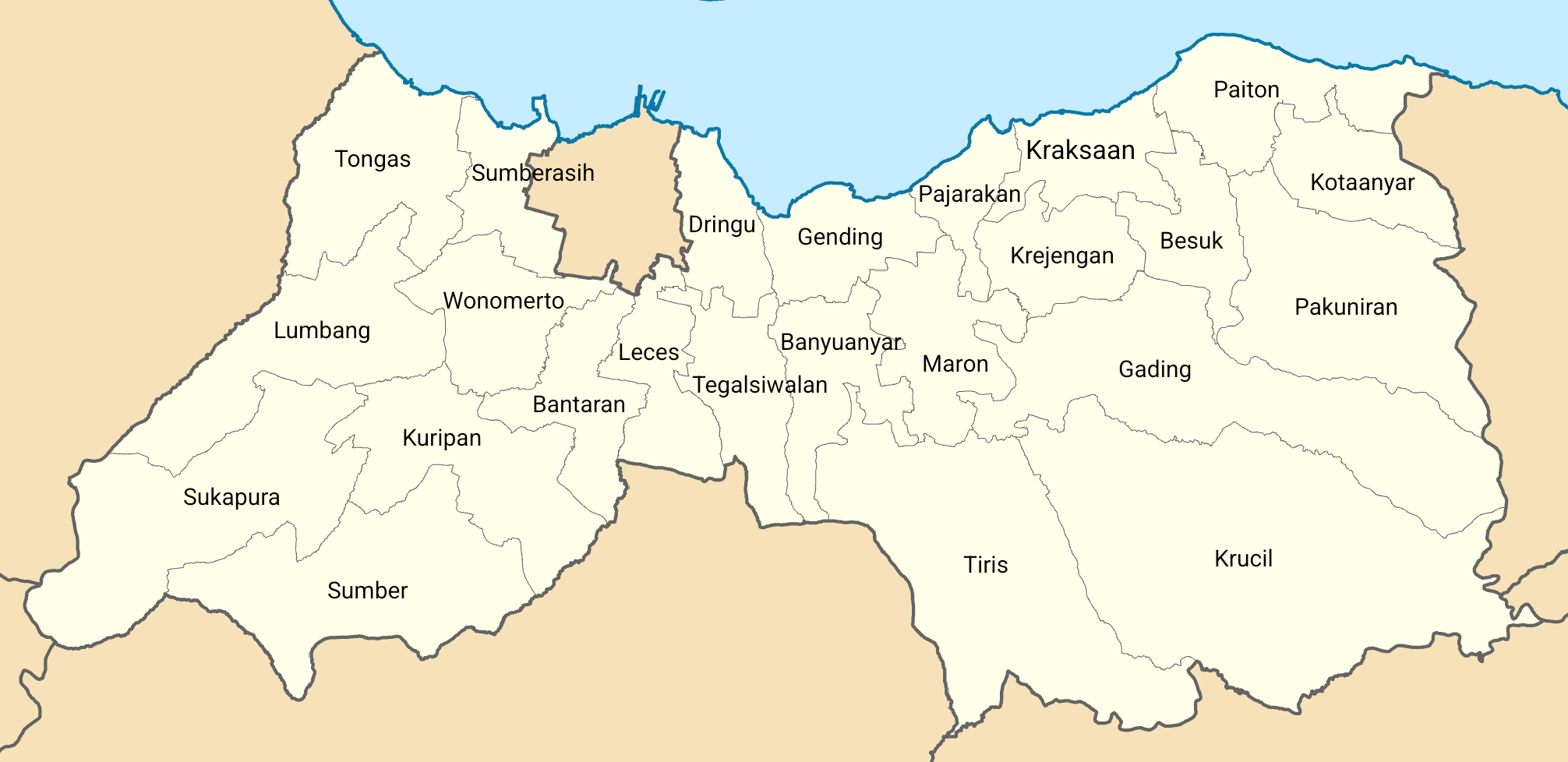
The map of districts in Probolinggo Regency

Probolinggo Regency now consists of twenty-four districts (kecamatan), tabulated below with their areas and population totals from the 2010 Census and the 2020 Census, together with the official estimates as at mid 2025. The table also includes the number of administrative villages in each district (totaling 325 rural desa and 5 urban kelurahan - the latter all in Kraksaan District), and its postal codes. Each district has the same name as its administrative centre.

Kode Wilayah	Name of District (kecamatan)	Area in km^{2}	Pop'n Census 2010	Pop'n Census 2020	Pop'n Estimate mid 2025	No. of villages	Post codes
35.13.01	Sukapura	102.08	19,571	19,644	20,162	12	67254
35.13.02	Sumber	141.88	26,138	26,038	27,080	9	67263
35.13.03	Kuripan	66.75	29,254	30,196	31,856	7	67262
35.13.04	Bantaran	42.13	40,641	43,150	46,137	10	67261 ^{(a)}
35.13.05	Leces	36.81	54,703	57,005	59,117	10	67273
35.13.20	Tegalsiwalan	41.74	36,221	36,830	38,920	12	67274
35.13.06	Banyuanyar	45.70	52,206	54,736	58,249	14	67275
35.13.07	Tiris	165.67	63,404	68,524	73,965	16	67287
35.13.08	Krucil	202.53	52,368	56,790	60,443	14	67288
35.13.09	Gading	146.85	48,113	53,338	56,339	19	67292
35.13.10	Pakuniran	113.85	42,244	44,075	46,804	17	67290
35.13.11	Kotaanyar	42.58	35,131	36,559	38,559	13	67293
35.13.12	Paiton	53.28	68,914	67,949	72,375	20	67291
35.13.13	Besuk	35.04	45,658	49,535	53,260	17	67283
35.13.14	Kraksaan	37.80	65,590	68,146	71,679	18 ^{(b)}	67282
35.13.15	Krejengan	34.43	38,036	40,430	42,831	17	67284
35.13.16	Pajarakan	21.34	33,667	33,936	35,474	12	67281
35.13.17	Maron	51.39	61,864	65,384	69,493	18	67276
35.13.18	Gending	36.61	39,098	41,815	43,784	13	67272
35.13.19	Dringu	31.13	50,737	53,642	54,086	14	67271
35.13.22	Wonomerto	45.67	38,569	40,868	44,512	11	67253
35.13.24	Lumbang	92.71	31,015	32,203	34,021	10	67255
35.13.23	Tongas	77.95	63,623	67,704	71,444	14	67252
35.13.21	Sumberasih ^{(c)}	30.25	59,479	64,040	67,344	13	67251
	Totals	1,696.17	1,096,244	1,152,537	1,217,934	330	

Notes: (a) excluding the village of Besuk, which has a post code of 67283.
(b) comprises 5 urban kelurahan (Semampir, Patokan, Sidomukti, Kraksaan Wetan and Kandangjati Kulon) and 13 rural desa.
(c) includes the offshore island of Pulau Giliketapang.

There are 11 districts in the west of the regency, with the city of Probolinggo providing a focus - these are Sukapura, Sumber, Kuripan, Bantaran, Leces, Tegalsiwalan, Dringu, Wonomerto, Lumbank, Tongas and Sumberasih Districts. The other 13 districts are in the east of the regency, centred on Kraksaan District.

== Tourism ==
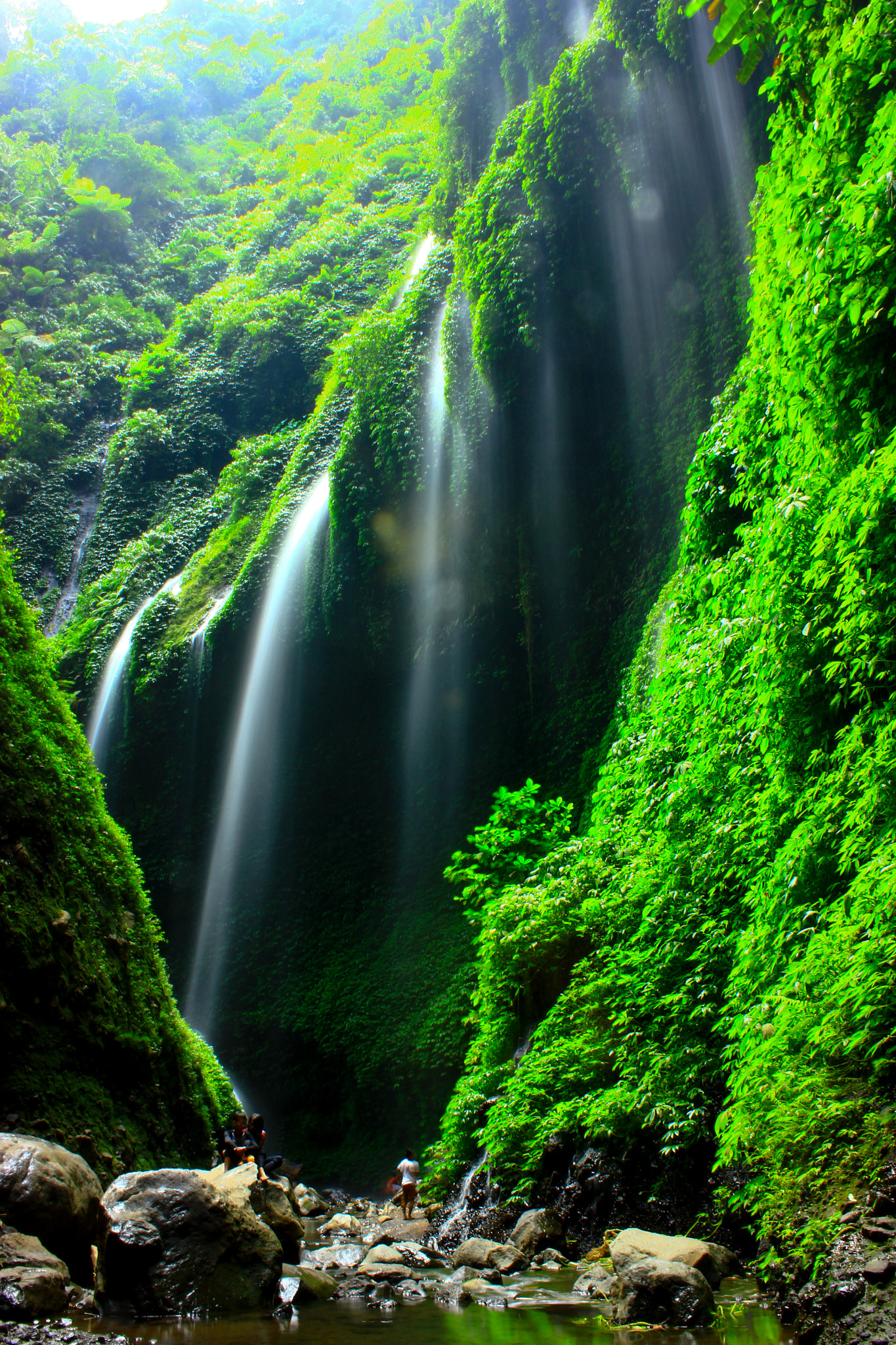
Madakaripura Waterfall near Bromo

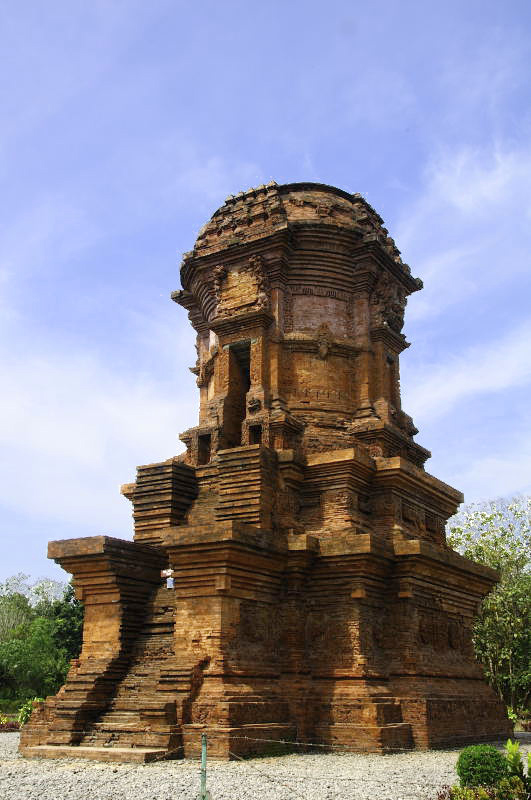
The Jabung temple

Probolinggo Regency has various tourist attractions including Mount Bromo, Madakaripura waterfall, white water rafting along the Pekalen River, and also the Jabung Buddhist temple.

=== Rafting on the Pekalen River ===
The location is about one hour from Bromo Tengger Semeru National Park, from which the Pekalen River flows to the city of Probolinggo, wth difficulties up to grade 3+. There are many bat caves and also small waterfalls along the cliffs along Pekalen River which are difficult to find at other rivers.

== Bibliography ==
- Sapto, Ari (2020). Gerilya Republik di Kota Probolinggo 1947-1949 [Republic's Guerrilla in Probolinggo City 1947-1949]. Matapadi. ISBN 978-602-1634-42-4.
