= Malang Regency Regional House of Representatives =

Unicameral legislature of the Indonesian regency of Malang

Malang Regency Regional House of Representatives Dewan Perwakilan Rakyat Daerah Kabupaten Malang
- 2024–2029 period

Type
- Type: Unicameral
- Term limits: 5 years

History
- New session started: 30 August 2024

Leadership
- Speaker: Darmadi, PDI-P since 29 October 2024
- Deputy Speaker: Kholiq, PKB since 29 October 2024
- Deputy Speaker: Alayk Mubarrok, Gerindra since 29 October 2024
- Deputy Speaker: Sudarman, Golkar since 29 October 2024

Structure
- Seats: 50
- Political groups: Government (38): PDI-P (13); PKB (11); Gerindra (8); NasDem (6); Opposition (12): Golkar (8); PKS (2); Hanura (1); Democratic (1)

Elections
- Voting system: Open list
- Last election: 14 February 2024

Meeting place
- Malang Regency Regional House of Representatives Building; Panji Street Number 119; Penarukan, Kepanjen, Malang Regency; East Java, Indonesia

Website
- dprd.malangkab.go.id

The Malang Regency Regional House of Representatives is the unicameral municipal legislature of Malang Regency, East Java, Indonesia. It has 50 members, who are elected every five years, simultaneously with the national legislative election.

== Legal basis ==
The legislature for Malang Regency was formed along with those of other regencies in East Java under Law Number 12 of 1950, which organized regency governments within the province.

== General election results ==
=== 2024 Indonesian legislative election ===
The official valid votes received by political parties contesting the 2024 Indonesian legislative election in each electoral district (constituency) for members of the Malang Regency Regional House of Representatives are as follows.

2024 Indonesian legislative election results

Electoral district	PKB	Gerindra	PDI-P	Golkar	NasDem	Labour	Gelora	PKS	PKN	Hanura	Garuda	PAN	PBB	Democratic	PSI	Perindo	PPP	Ummat	Valid votes
Malang 1	26,769	38,149	58,958	17,001	15,979	881	1,166	13,654	183	424	0	1,957	150	9,175	2,846	514	11,119	773	199,698
Malang 2	37,604	45,772	53,381	26,439	21,240	412	1,307	13,912	78	259	0	1,100	166	3,681	3,002	485	8,459	465	217,762
Malang 3	45,372	28,354	56,530	26,617	14,711	306	1,962	3,297	89	349	0	5,994	138	5,273	2,203	315	13,714	176	205,400
Malang 4	38,626	35,420	41,591	21,693	13,617	1,013	1,879	7,441	111	13,559	0	2,483	180	8,495	5,519	1,029	4,500	376	197,532
Malang 5	45,673	38,493	47,300	20,734	32,210	1,110	2,647	11,959	603	346	0	9,297	311	9,288	5,482	1,157	7,068	732	234,410
Malang 6	48,366	35,059	42,792	45,789	11,183	1,716	2,200	18,371	896	494	0	4,486	368	15,268	8,678	2,604	4,345	500	243,115
Malang 7	48,878	34,692	51,855	33,499	22,489	945	2,005	11,387	493	364	0	6,632	242	6,589	3,005	695	10,672	514	234,956
Total	291,288	255,939	352,407	191,772	131,429	6,383	13,166	80,021	2,453	15,795	0	31,949	1,555	57,769	30,735	6,799	59,877	3,536	1,532,873
Source: General Elections Commission of Indonesia

== Composition ==
The following is the composition of members of the Malang Regency Regional House of Representatives in the last five periods.

Party	Total seats				
Party	2004–2009	2009–2014	2014–2019	2019–2024	2024–2029
PKB seats	13	▼8	8	▲12	▼11
Gerindra seats		3	▲7	7	▲8
PDI-P seats	15	▼13	13	▼12	▲13
Golkar seats	7	▲8	▲12	▼8	8
NasDem seats			4	▲7	▼6
PKS seats	1	▲4	▼0	0	▲2
Hanura seats		4	▼1	1	1
Demokrat seats	6	▲8	▼3	▼1	1
PPP seats	3	▼1	▲2	2	▼0
PKNU seats		1			
Total Seats	45	▲50	50	50	50
Total Party	6	▲9	▼8	8	8

== Electoral District ==
In the 2019 Legislative Election and the 2024 Legislative Election, the Malang Regency Regional House of Representatives election was divided into 7 electoral districts as follows:

Electoral District Name	Electoral District Area	Number of Seats
MALANG 1	Bululawang, Gondanglegi, Kepanjen, Pagelaran	7
MALANG 2	Ampelgading, Dampit, Tirtoyudo, Turen	7
MALANG 3	Bantur, Donomulyo, Gedangan, Pagak, Sumbermanjing Wetan	7
MALANG 4	Kalipare, Kromengan, Ngajum, Pakisaji, Sumberpucung, Wonosari	7
MALANG 5	Dau, Karangploso, Kasembon, Ngantang, Pujon, Wagir	7
MALANG 6	Lawang, Pakis, Singosari	8
MALANG 7	Jabung, Poncokusumo, Tajinan, Tumpang, Wajak	7
TOTAL		50

== See also ==
- East Java Regional House of Representatives
- Malang Regency
- East Java
