= Regent of Malang =

- Bupati Malang
- Coat of arms of Malang Regency

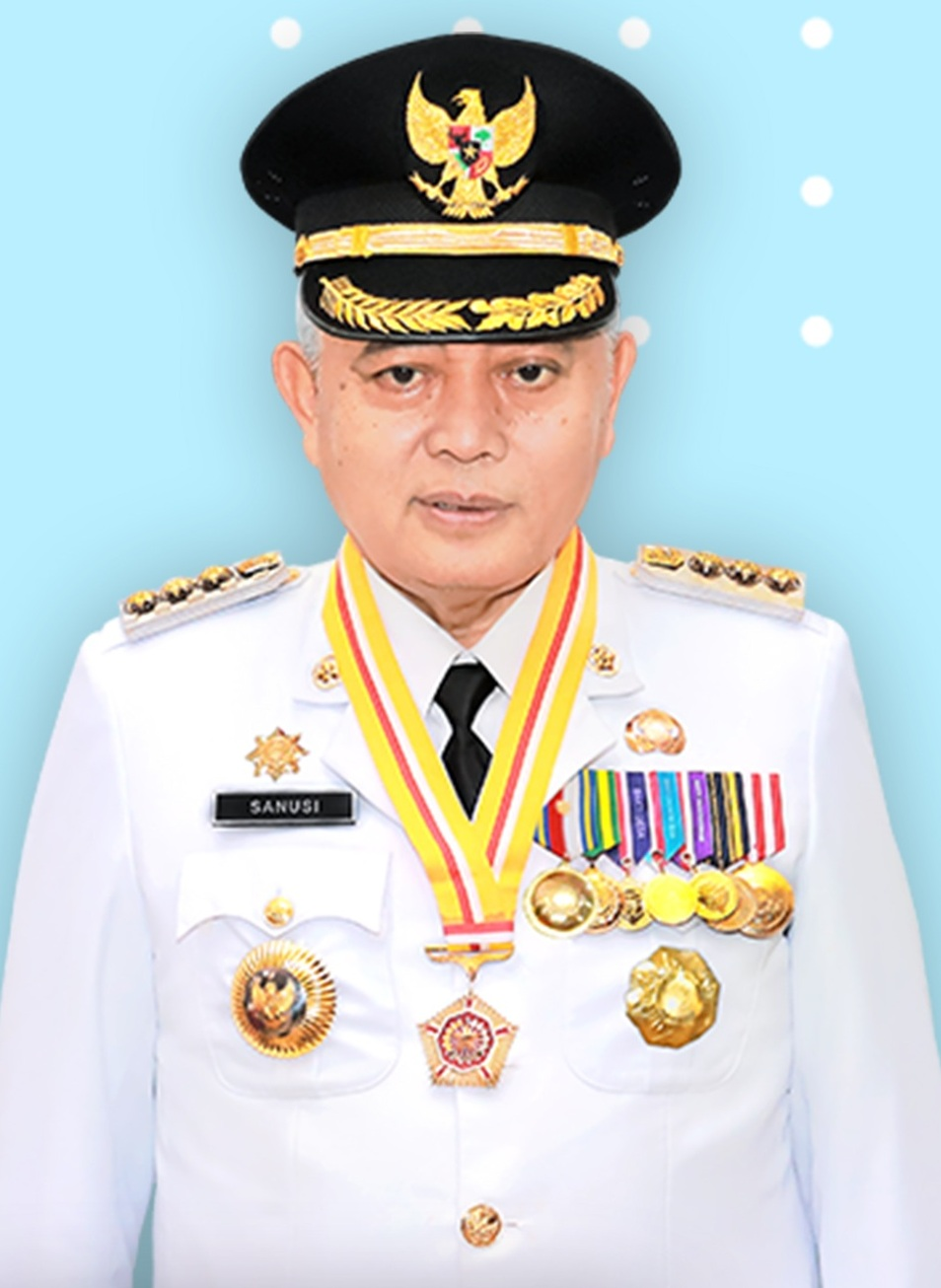
- Incumbent; M. Sanusi since 26 February 2021
- Term length: 5 years
- Inaugural holder: R.T Notodiningrat I
- Formation: 1819; 207 years ago
- Website: www.malangkab.go.id

Regent of Malang is the head of the second-level region who holds the government in Malang Regency, Indonesia, together with the Vice Regent and 50 members of the Malang Regency Regional House of Representatives. The regent and vice regent of Malang are elected through general elections held every 5 years. The first regent of Malang was R.T Notodiningrat I, who governed the city during the Dutch colonisation period from 1819 to 1839.

== List ==
The following is a list of Regents of Malang officials from time to time.

Num.	Portrait	Regent	Beginning of office	End of term	Period	Note	Vice Regent
1		R.T. Notodiningrat I	1819	12 November 1839	1		—
2		R.A.A. Notodiningrat II	12 November 1839	3 May 1884	2	Obituary	—
3		R.T.A. Notodiningrat III	31 July 1884	8 July 1898	3	News of death with initial date of office	—
4		R.A.A. Soerioadiningrat I Raden Sjarip	24 November 1898	31 July 1933	4	Retirement news	—
5		R.A.A. Sam	23 August 1934	31 July 1945	5		—
6		R. Soedono	12 October 1945	17 March 1950	6		—
7		R. M. T. Ronggo Moestedjo	1947	1950	7	(Note: Federal regent)	—
8		Haji Said Hidajat	17 March 1950	11 April 1950	8		—
9		Mr. Ngabehi R. Soentoro	11 April 1950	28 May 1958	9		—
10		R. Soendoro Hardjoamidjojo; SH.	3 April 1958	31 December 1959	10		—
11		Mas Djapan Notoboedojo	31 December 1959	14 May 1964	11	(Note: Centralization)	—
12		Moch. Sun'an; SH.	14 May 1964	1 November 1969	12		—
13		Kol. Inf. H. R. Sowignjo	1 November 1969	21 November 1979	13		—
13		Kol. Inf. H. R. Sowignjo	1 November 1969	21 November 1979	14		—
14		Kol. Inf. Eddy Slamet	22 October 1980	20 October 1985	15		—
15		Kol. Inf. Abdul Hamid Mahmud	22 October 1985	24 October 1995	16		—
15		Kol. Inf. Abdul Hamid Mahmud	22 October 1985	24 October 1995	17		—
16		Kol. Inf. Muhammad Said	24 October 1995	26 October 2000	18		Drs. Soenyono; M.Si.
17		Ir. Mochammad Ibnu Rubianto; MBA	26 October 2000	24 January 2001	19	(Note: Died in office)	H. Sujud Pribadi; S.Sos.
18		H. Sujud Pribadi; S.Sos	24 January 2001	26 October 2005	19		—
18		H. Sujud Pribadi; S.Sos	26 October 2005	24 October 2010	20 (2005)		Rendra Kresna
19		Rendra Kresna	24 October 2010	2 November 2015	21 (2010)		H. Achmad Subhan; A.Md.
—		Ir. Hadi Prasetyo; M.M.	3 November 2015	16 February 2016	—	(Note: Acting Regent)	—
(19)		Rendra Kresna	17 February 2016	15 October 2018	22 (2015)		Drs. H. M. Sanusi; M.M.
—		Drs. H. M. Sanusi; M.M.	15 October 2018	17 September 2019	22 (2015)	(Note: Acting Officer)	—
20		Drs. H. M. Sanusi; M.M.	17 September 2019	26 September 2020	22 (2015)		—
—		Drs. Sjaichul Ghulam; M.M.	26 September 2020	5 December 2020	22 (2015)	(Note: Acting)	—
(20)		Drs. H. M. Sanusi; M.M.	5 December 2020	17 February 2021	22 (2015)		—
—		Dr. Ir. Wahyu Hidayat; M.M.	17 February 2021	26 February 2021	—	(Note: Daily Executive)	—
(20)		Drs. H. M. Sanusi; M.M.	26 February 2021	20 February 2025	23 (2020)		Drs. H. Didik Gatot Subroto; S.H., M.H.
(20)		Drs. H. M. Sanusi; M.M.	20 February 2025	Incumbent	24 (2024)		Dra. Hj. Lathifah Shohib
Abbreviation of Name: R. = Raden; R.T. = Raden Tumenggung; R.A.A. = Raden Adipati Ario; R.T.A. = Raden Tumenggung Ario; R.M.T. = Raden Mas Tumenggung; Catatan

ABRI
National Awakening Party
Indonesian Democratic Party of Struggle
Golkar Party

== See also ==
- Malang Regency
- List of incumbent regional heads and deputy regional heads in East Java
