= Lathifah Shohib =

Indonesian politician (born 1959)

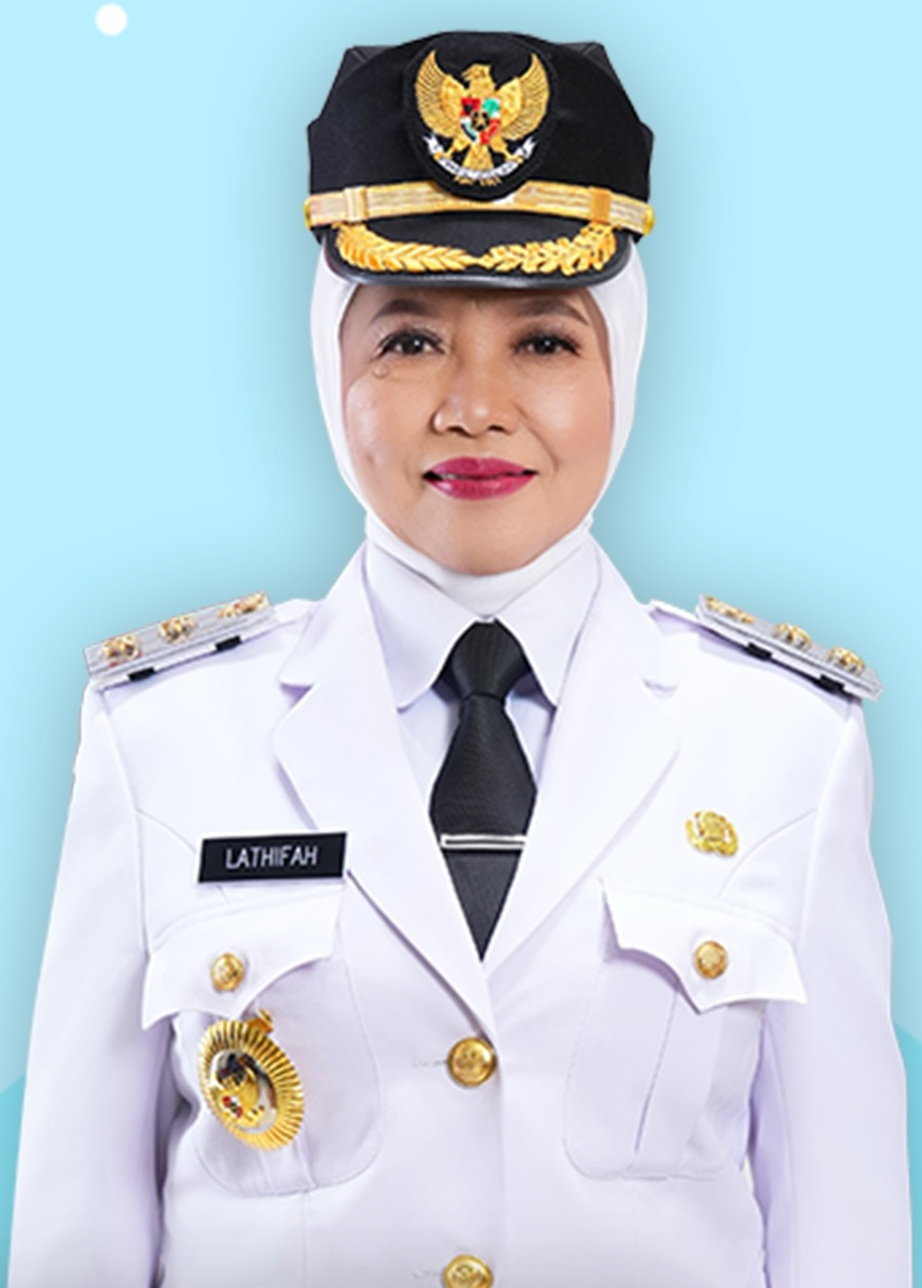

7th Vice regent of Malang
- Incumbent
- Assumed office 20 February 2025
- President: Prabowo Subianto
- Governor: Khofifah Indar Parawansa
- Regent: Sanusi
- Preceded by: Didik Gatot Subroto

Member of the People's Representative Council of the Republic of Indonesia
- In office 1 October 2014 – 23 September 2020
- President: Susilo Bambang Yudhoyono; Joko Widodo
- Speaker: Setya Novanto (2014–2015); Ade Komarudin (2016); Setya Novanto (2016–2017); Bambang Soesatyo (2018–2019); Puan Maharani (2019–2020)
- Succeeded by: Hasanuddin Wahid
- Parliamentary group: National Awakening Party Faction
- Constituency: East Java V
- Majority: 109.992 (2019)

Personal details
- Born: December 9, 1959 (age 66) Jombang, East Java, Indonesia
- Party: National Awakening Party
- Spouse: In'am Sulaiman (Alm.)
- Children: 3
- Education: Malang State University
- Occupation: Politician

Lathifah Shohib (born 9 December 1959) is a politician from the National Awakening Party who served as Deputy regent of Malang for the 2025–2030 term. She served since 20 February 2025 after being inaugurated by President Prabowo Subianto at the Istana Negara, Jakarta. Nyai Lathifah is also the granddaughter of one of the founders of Nahdlatul Ulama, K.H. Bisri Syansuri.

== Educational history ==
Nyai Lathifah spent her childhood in Jombang attending school at:

- Mambaul Maarif Elementary School (1966–1971),
- MTs AIN Mambaul Maarif (1972–1974)
- MA AIN Mambaul Maarif (1975–1977)

After completing her education in Jombang in 1978, Nyai Lathifah continued her higher education at IKIP Negeri Malang by majoring in Guidance and Counseling and graduated in 1982.

== Career ==
=== Political ===
Nyai Lathifah started her political career in the 2014 general election, she ran as a legislative member through the National Awakening Party. She was successfully elected and served as a member of the Indonesian House of Representatives for the 2014–2019 and 2019–2024 terms. However, in her second term as a member of the Indonesian House of Representatives, she resigned from her position because she participated in the 2020 Malang regency election. She ran as a candidate for Regent of Malang paired with Didik Budi Muljono who was supported by PKB and the Hanura Party, but she had to accept defeat with the support of 491.816 votes or 42,19 percent of the total valid votes.

After experiencing defeat in the 2020 Malang regency election, he again ran as Deputy regent of Malang in the 2024 Malang regency election accompanying the incumbent Regent of Malang Sanusi from the PDI Perjuangan. The pair, supported by a coalition of PDI Perjuangan, PKB, Gerindra Party, NasDem Party, and 7 non-parliamentary political parties, succeeded in winning in 32 of the 33 sub-districts by gaining the support of 782.356 votes or 66,22 percent of the total valid votes. They were then appointed by the Malang Regency KPU as the elected regent and deputy regent on Thursday, 6 February 2025.

Political offices
Preceded by Didik Gatot Subroto	Vice regent of Malang; 2025–now	Succeeded by Incumbent
