= Abdul Hamid Mahmud =

Indonesian politician (1942–2021)

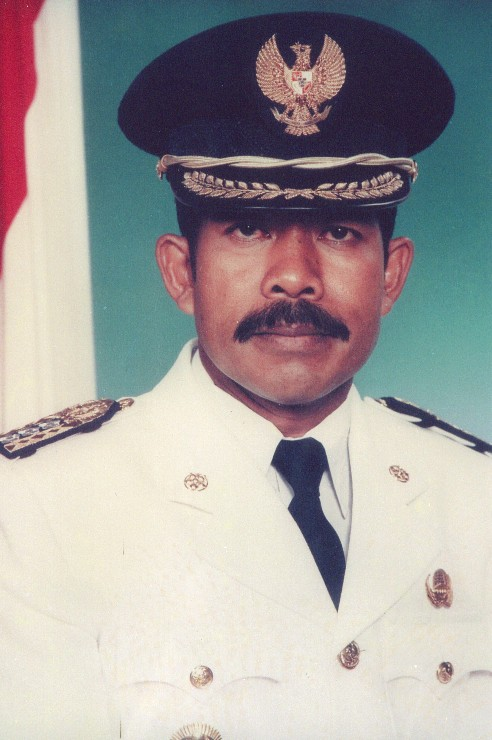
- Malang Regent 1985-1995 period, Colonel (Inf.) Abdul Hamid Mahmud

2nd [[Vice Governor of East Java]]
- In office 1995–2000
- Governor: Basofi Sudirman (until 1998); Imam Utomo (after 1998)
- Preceded by: Harwin Wasisto
- Succeeded by: Imam Supardi

15th [[Regent of Malang]]
- In office 22 October 1985 – 24 October 1995
- Preceded by: Eddy Slamet
- Succeeded by: Muhammad Said

Personal details
- Born: 15 January 1942 Blangkejeren, Gayo Lues, Dutch East Indies
- Died: 31 January 2021 (aged 79) Singosari, Malang, Indonesia
- Children: 4

Military service
- Branch/service: Indonesian Army
- Years of service: 1965–2000
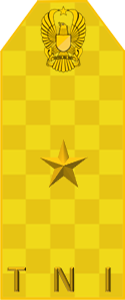
- Rank: Brigadier General TNI

Abdul Hamid Mahmud (15 January 1942 – 31 January 2021) was an Indonesian politician who served as Regent of Malang for two periods in 1985–1990 and 1990–1995. He also served as Deputy Governor of East Java for Government and Welfare from 1995 to 2000.

Abdul Hamid died of heart disease on Sunday 31 January 2021 at Panti Nirmala Hospital, Malang, at the age of 79. He was buried with military honors in the family cemetery, which is in the Areng-Areng area, Dau, Malang.
