= Lawang, Malang =

Lawang
- Town
- Nickname: Kota Apel (Apple Town)
- Motto(s): Mandiri, Agamis, Demokratis, Produktif, Maju, Aman, Tertib dan Berdaya Saing
- Location of Lawang within Java
- Coordinates: 7°49′48″S 112°42′0″E
- Country: Indonesia
- Province: East Java
- Regency: Malang

Government
  - District Chief: Ahmad Muwassi Arif

Area
  - Total: 68 km^{2} (26 sq mi)
- Elevation: 1,600 m (5,200 ft)

Population (mid 2024 estimate)
  - Total: 113,287
  - Density: 1,700/km^{2} (4,300/sq mi)
- Time zone: WIB (UTC+7)
- Postal Code: 65211 and 65212
- Area code: 0341
- Website: http://lawang.malangkab.go.id/

Lawang is a district and town in Malang Regency, East Java and is geographically located in the mountains and surrounded by Mount Arjuno and Mount Semeru. It covers an area of 68.23 km^{2} and had a population of 103,402 at the 2010 Census and 110,981 at the 2020 Census; the official estimate as at mid 2024 was 113,187. It borders with Singosari District to the south (in Malang Regency) and Purwodadi district of Pasuruan Regency to the north. Lawang is known as a resort town since the Dutch colonial era.

Tourist attractions in Lawang include Wonosari Tea Garden PTP XXIII, Polaman Baths, Swimming Pools, Krabayakan Tourism Village, and Mount Wedon. In addition, many historical buildings in Lawang are of Dutch origin.

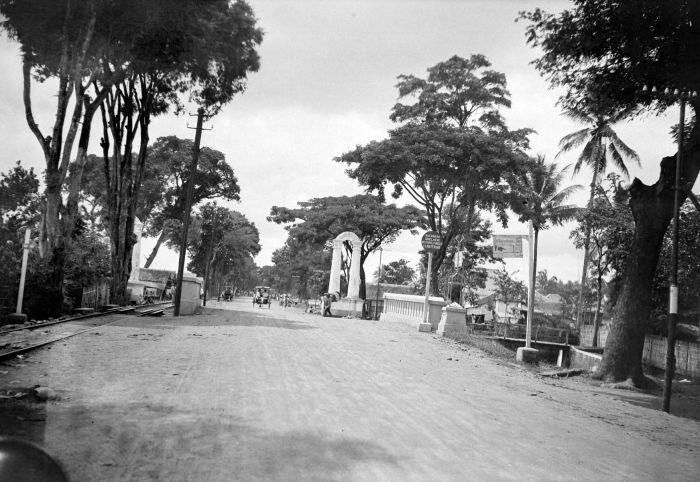
Main road in Lawang on the border with Malang residency Pasuruan, East Java in circa 1924.

Together with Singosari and Kepanjen, Lawang is known as the main buffer satellite city of Malang, and is included in the area of Malang Raya (Greater Malang).

Hurustiati Subandrio, Sukarno-era politician and wife of Foreign Minister Subandrio, was born in Lawang.
