= Kepanjen =

District and Capital of Malang Regency, Indonesia

- District and Administrative Center
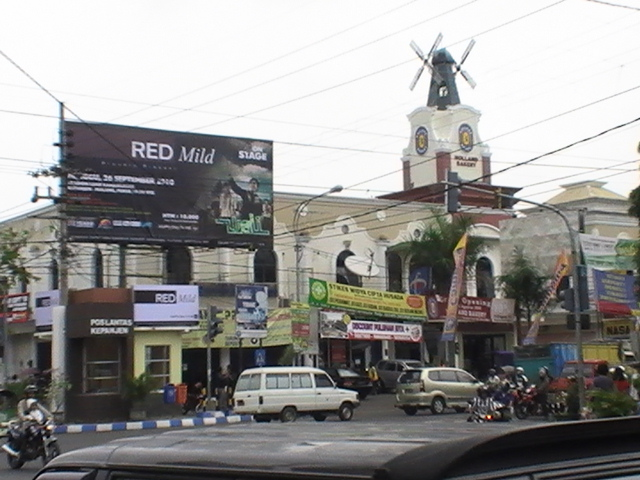
- A junction in Kepanjen district

- Location in Java and Indonesia Kepanjen (Indonesia)
- Coordinates: 8°07′55″S 112°33′41″E
- Country: Indonesia
- Province: East Java
- Regency: Malang Regency

Area
  - Total: 48 km^{2} (19 sq mi)
- Elevation: 336 m (1,102 ft)

Population (2021 Census)
  - Total: 111,394
  - Density: 2,300/km^{2} (6,000/sq mi)
- Time zone: UTC+7 (UTC+07:00)
- Postal code: 65163
- Website: kepanjen.malangkab.go.id

Kepanjen is a district and the capital of Malang Regency, Indonesia. Kepanjen is approximately 20 kilometres (12 mi) south of Malang. Along with Singosari and Batu, Kepanjen act as Satellite city for Malang City. Kepanjen is part of Greater Malang Metropolitan Area.

== Background ==
Government Regulation No. 18 of 2008 concerning Approval of Moving the Capital City of Malang Regency to Kepanjen District marks the beginning of the establishment of Kepanjen as the new regency capital.

== Geography ==
Kepanjen is located in south center of Malang Regency. Kepanjen has an average altitude of 336 metres (1,102 ft) above sea level. Kepanjen is surrounded by three large mountains: Mount Kawi, Mount Semeru and Southern Malang Mountains.

=== Administrative borders ===
Direction	Borders with
North	Pakisaji; Ngajum
South	Pagak; Pagelaran
East	Gondanglegi; Bululawang
West	Kromengan; Sumberpucung; Ngajum

== Governance ==
Kepanjen District is governed by a district mayor.

=== Administrative divisions ===
Kepanjen District consist of 14 villages and 4 sub-districts, as shown on the table below:

Village/sub-district	Name
Village	Curungrejo
Village	Dilem
Village	Jatirejoyoso
Village	Jenggolo
Village	Kedungpedaringan
Village	Kemiri
Village	Mangunrejo
Village	Mojosari
Village	Ngadilangkung
Village	Panggungrejo
Village	Sengguruh
Village	Sukoraharjo
Village	Tegalsari
Village	Talangagung
Sub-district	Ardirejo
Sub-district	Cepokomulyo
Sub-district	Penarukan
Sub-district	Kepanjen

== Economy ==
=== Tourism ===
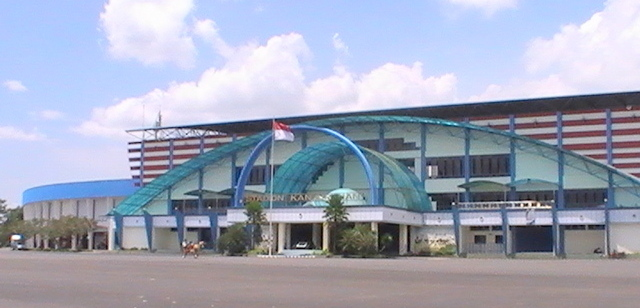
Kanjuruhan Stadium is located within this district

There are various tourist attractions in this district, such as Sumber Maron rafting, Milkindo Green Farm, and Kanjuruhan Stadium.

== Sports ==
=== Association football ===
- Arema F.C., currently competing in Liga 1.
- Persekam Metro F.C., currently competing in Liga 3.

Kanjuruhan Stadium was home to Arema and has been home to Persekam Metro FC.

== Transportation ==
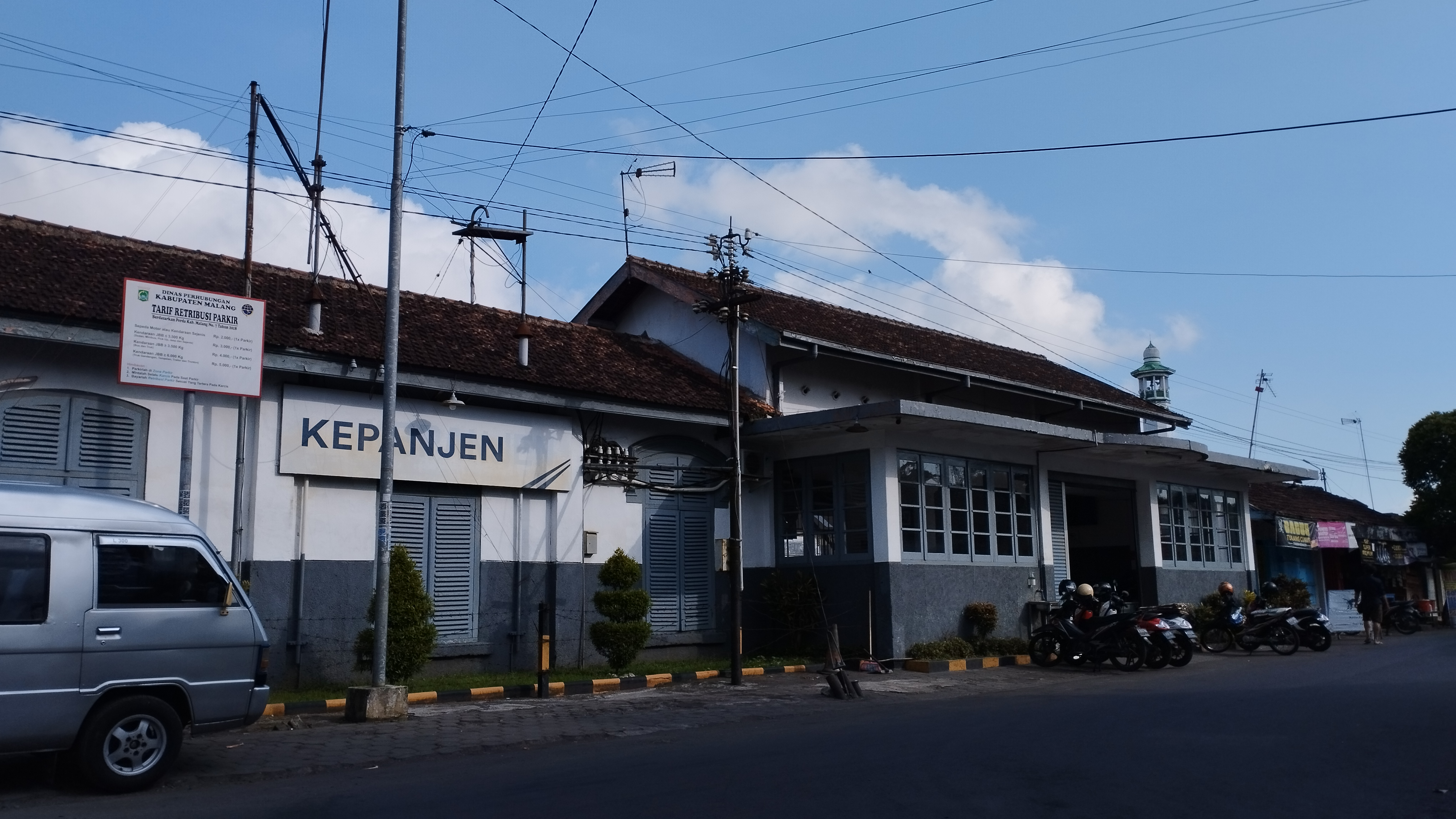
Kepanjen Train station

Kepanjen is connected by a commuter line that runs between Lawang-Malang-Kepanjen. Kepanjen is accessible by other major cities in Java through Kepanjen Station and Kepanjen Terminal. There are plans to make Kepanjen accessible by toll road through Malang-Kepanjen Toll Road, allowing Kepanjen to be linked to Malang, Pasuruan Regency and Surabaya.

== See also ==
- Malang Regency
- Districts of Indonesia
- List of districts of East Java
