= Indonesian Women's Congress =

Federation of women's organizations in Indonesia

Indonesian Women's Congress (Kowani) logo

The Indonesian Women's Congress (Indonesian: Kongres Wanita Indonesia), often known by its Indonesian acronym Kowani, is a federation of Indonesian women's organizations which was founded in 1946. Its headquarters are located in Jakarta. The name also refers to national congresses which have taken place regularly since 1928. Since its founding the Congress has included women from various political and religious backgrounds; it has generally allowed independence and autonomy for its member organizations.

== History ==
=== Colonial era ===
Various organizations of native Indonesian women arose during the early twentieth century while Indonesia was still part of the Dutch East Indies; these include the Aisjijah, founded in 1917 and affiliated with Muhammadiyah, and Poetri Mardika, founded in 1912 and associated with the Budi Utomo movement. With the rise in Indonesian nationalism following the Youth Pledge of 1928, and increasing efforts to unify all the various groups of the nationalist movement, the first Indonesian Women's Congress took place on 22 December 1928 in Yogyakarta. This first Congress was chaired by Raden Ayu Soekanto and attended by 600 or so delegates, mostly members of Aisjijah. 20 or 30 other groups also sent delegates, including Wanita Katolik (Catholic women), Poetri Mardika, and Wanita Taman Siswa (Taman Siswa women); organizations from Sumatra and other more remote parts of the Indies sent their support by telegram. At that meeting a federation was established to unite the various independent native women's groups in the colony; it was called the Perikatan Perkoempoelan Perempoean Indonesia (PPPI, or Organization of Indonesian Women's Associations). A major topic of the Congress was marriage and how to improve women's condition in it. At the Congress there were also proposals to establish a girls' education fund, promote hygiene education, to found a girl scout organization and to combat child marriage.

The second congress was held in Batavia in December 1929; this time, over 50 organizations sent delegates, including male-run groups such as Jong Java, and the organization was renamed Perikatan Perkoempoelan Isteri Indonesia (PPII, or Organization of Indonesian Wives' Associations). The federation also launched an Indonesian-language publication called Istri ('wife') which had around 700 subscribers. Tensions between federation members who wanted an explicitly nationalist platform and those who wanted to remain apolitical continued to develop. In the months after the 1929 conference, a faction emerged with a more working-class and left-wing orientation called Isteri-Sedar ('conscious wives'). That group, officially founded in March 1930, chafed at the PPII's caution and conservatism and called for a more radical approach; its organization eventually split with the PPII.

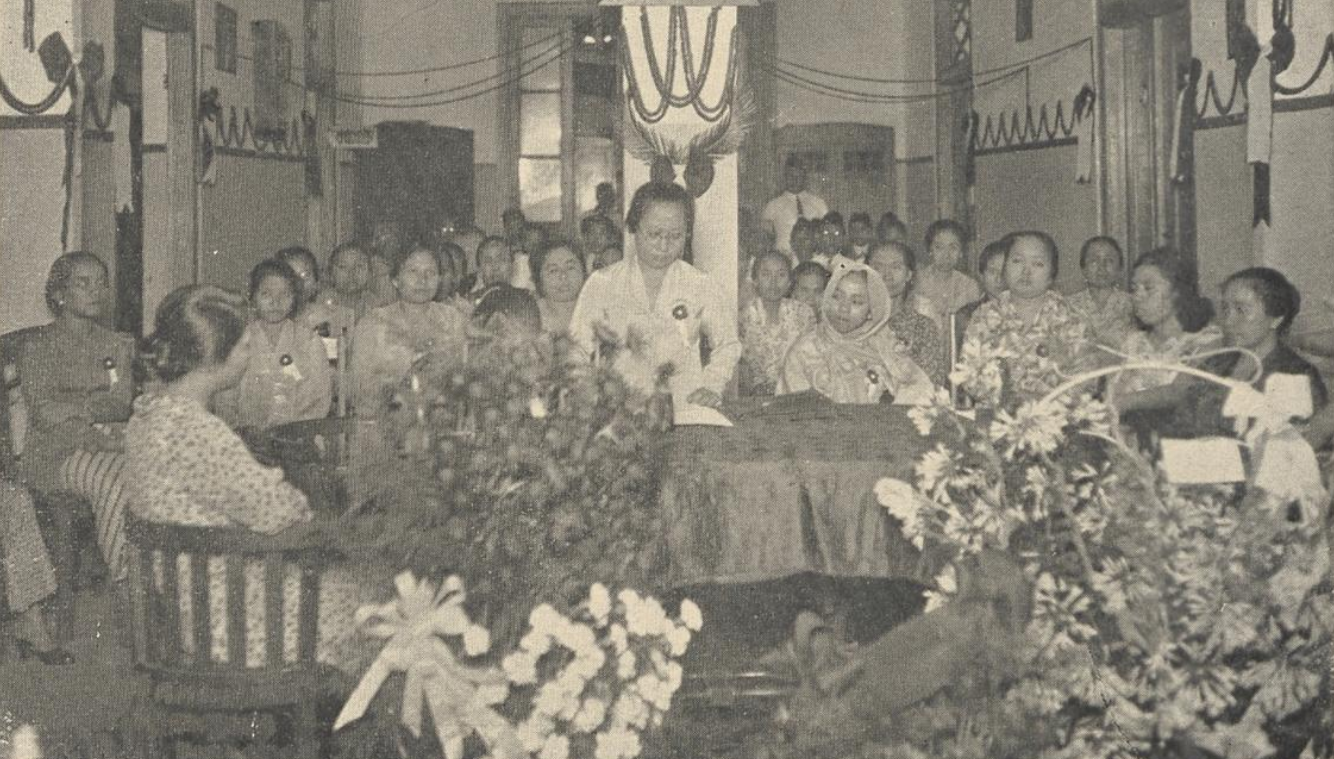
Indonesian Women's Congress of 1930 in Surabaya, Dutch East Indies

At the December 1930 Women's Congress in Surabaya, which Isteri-Sedar participated in, it was decided that the PPII would support Indonesian nationalist politics and the struggle for liberation from Dutch rule, although the organization still maintained some pretenses at being apolitical. The next year the PPII sent delegates, including Maria Ulfah Santoso, to the All-Asian Women's Conference in Lahore in 1931. (Isteri-Sedar also sent delegates to the Lahore conference, and enraged Muslim members of the PPII by comments they made there which were deemed to be anti-religious.) The next Women's Congress was held in 1932 in Surakarta. At their 1935 meeting in Batavia (now Jakarta), the name of the group was changed once again to Kongres Perempoean Indonesia (Indonesian Women's Congress). At that meeting the topic of marriage was again discussed at length and the possibility of improving women's status within the framework of Islamic law was studied. The group met once again in Bandung in 1938, where it once again asserted the centrality of the national struggle against the Dutch.

During World War II and the Japanese occupation of the Dutch East Indies, the Congress ceased operations due to the strict political control by the Japanese. Clandestine or informal connections continued during this time but the group did not meet officially.

=== Early independence era and Guided Democracy period ===
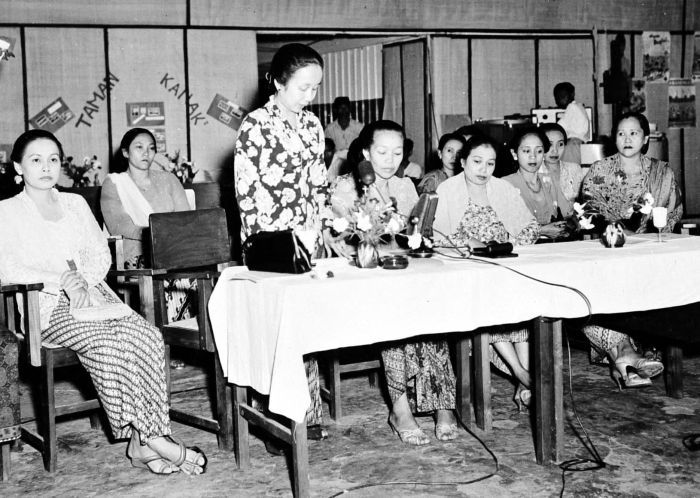
Maria Ulfah Santoso and Kowani delegates in 1950

After the end of the Japanese occupation, Indonesia declared independence in 1945. During the first year of independence various women's organizations arose including Persatuan Wanita Indonesia (Indonesian Women's Association, Perwari) and Wanita Indonesia (Indonesian Women, Wani). The Congress met once again in 1946 and adopted its present-day name Kongres Wanita Indonesia (Indonesian Women's Congress, often shortened to Kowani). Under that name it also took on a role like the PPPI or other colonial-era groups, acting as a federation of smaller groups which agreed to work together despite their differences. This newly established organization was supportive of the Indonesian Republic against the Dutch, and gave material support to that armed conflict, as well as making contact with international women's organizations to seek out support for their cause. After Indonesia became independent, the group continued to support nationalist causes such as the Indonesian claim over Western New Guinea or the anti-Malaysia Konfrontasi campaign. It sent delegates to the Asian-African Women's Conference in Colombo in 1958.

The Congress had various prominent leaders during this era who had been involved in the independence struggle. Siti Sukaptinah Sunaryo Mangunpuspito was chair from 1947 to 1949. From the period of 1950 to 1961, longtime member and prominent Indonesian feminist Maria Ulfah Santoso was head of the Congress; after 1961, Hurustiati Subandrio, a close Sukarno ally, became its head and the Congress moved more solidly to the left.

=== New Order era ===
Unlike many mass organizations which were outlawed during the Transition to the New Order in 1966–67, such as Gerwani, the Indonesian Women's Congress continued to operate in the increasingly conservative Suharto era. However, its politics changed drastically from progressivism to conformity. Leftist-affiliated groups which had been members of the Congress were expelled, and Hurustiati Subandrio was removed from her leadership position in early 1966. Former major issues of the organization such as campaigns against sexual harassment and for child care were dropped and the 1966 Congress was forced to adopt a new programme focusing on motherhood, wifehood and national development. Other conservative women's organizations were founded in subsequent years including Dharma Wanita (Women's duty) for wives of civil servants and Dharma Pertiwi for the wives of military servicemen. Nonetheless the Congress continued to grow during the New Order era; by 1994 it encompassed 70 organizations. Despite the political restrictions of the New Order, the Congress did provide a forum for new generations of feminists and women to criticize the treatment of women in Indonesian society.

=== Present era ===
The organization has continued to be influential after the fall of the Suharto regime in 1998. In general, it has maintained a fairly conservative approach to women's rights, with a focus on human rights and an adherence to traditional gender roles. It condemned the sexual assaults which took place during the May 1998 riots of Indonesia. A Congress was held in December 1998, to mark the 70th anniversary of the original congress as well as to discuss the political changes occurring in the country. The newly open political environment saw major changes in the messaging and composition of the congress, including the participation of delegates from lesbian and sex worker organizations, as well as a testimony from a former Gerwani member. However, this new openness did receive some pushback, including from the Kowani chairperson Ine Sukarno, who published a letter denouncing the rehabilitation of Gerwani in 1999.

At the 23rd Congress in 2009, Kowani put forward an eight-point platform: Education, Health, Supremacy of the Law and Constitution, Popular Welfare, National Dignity, Environment, Human Rights, and Gender Equality and Justice.
