= Siti Sukaptinah Sunaryo Mangunpuspito =

Indonesian women's rights activist and politician

Siti Sukaptinah Sunaryo Mangunpuspito, also spelled Siti Soekaptinah Soenarjo Mangoenpoespito (28 December 1907 - 31 August 1991) was an Indonesian women's rights activist and politician who was one of only two female members of the Investigating Committee for Preparatory Work for Independence and later became a member of the Indonesian parliament.

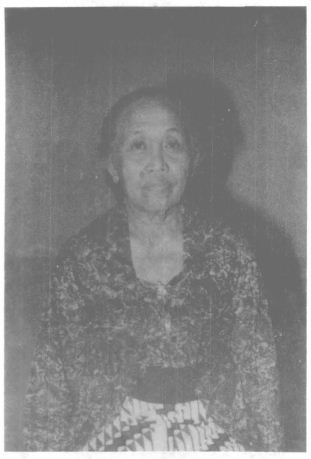
Siti Sukaptinah Sunaryo Mangunpuspito

== Early life and education ==
Siti Sukaptinah was born in Yogyakarta. Her father, R. Penewu Abdul Wahid Mustopo, worked at the sultan's palace. From a young age, Siti disagreed with arranged marriage, and believed that a woman had the right to choose her own match. She attended a Dutch school for natives from 1916 to 1921, then continued her education at a Dutch higher primary school, graduating in 1924. While a student there, she joined the Jong Java youth organization, which marked the beginning of her political career. She then studied at a Taman Siswa school until 1926 and worked as a teacher after graduating.

== Pre-war activism ==
In 1926, Siti left Jong Java and joined the Indonesian Youth (Pemuda Indonesia) organization. In 1928, she attended the first Indonesian Women's Congress, serving as secretary as well as a representative of a Yogyakarta-based women's Islamic organization, of which she became a senior figure. On the first day of the congress, 22 December, a song that Siti had written was sung. The congress agreed to establish an Indonesian Women's Association, and Siri became its first secretary. In 1932, a number of organizations combined to form Indonesian Wives (Isteri Indonesia), and Siti was appointed chair. From 1934 to 1938, she was a member of the Budi Utomo political organization. At the third Indonesian Women's Congress, which took place in Bandung in July 1938, she put forward the idea of a Mother's Day. Her idea was accepted by acclamation, and the day was first marked on 22 December 1938. Also in 1938, she was appointed to the Semarang City Council, representing the Parindra Party. In 1940, she became chair of the board for the fourth Indonesian Women's Congress in Semarang, again representing Parindra. Because of her activism, in 1942, she was asked to appear before the Visman Commission, which had been established by the Dutch to hear the opinions of nationalists about the governance of the Dutch East Indies. She told the commission that she wanted Indonesia to have a parliament. When the Japanese invaded in May 1942, she moved to Semarang.

== Japanese Occupation ==
During the Japanese occupation of the Dutch East Indies, Siti joined a number of organizations established in Java by the occupation government, including the Center of People's Power (Putera), in which she became head of the women's section from 1943 to 1944, and the Java Service Association (Jawa Hokokai) from 1944 to 1945, again serving as head of women's affairs. In 1945, she became one of only two female members of the 62-member Investigating Committee for Preparatory Work for Independence (BPUPK), which was established by the Japanese 16th Army to begin preparing Java for independence. Siti sat on the BPUPK committee discussing nation building, and expressed the view that an independent Indonesia should have the same form of government as that under the Japanese, but with the supreme military commander replaced by a head of state.

== Post-independence activities ==
Following the August 1945 proclamation of Indonesian independence, Siti became a member of the Central Indonesian National Committee (KNIP), an advisory and subsequently legislative body. She later became a member of the KNIP Working Committee, representing the Masyumi Party, which she had joined in 1946. From 1947 to 1949 she was chair of the Indonesian Women's Congress (KOWANI). After the Dutch recognition of independence, she was a member of the provisional parliament from 1950 to 1956, and then served another 12 years in the legislature from 1956. In 1968, she retired, saying she was already old and wanted to make room for younger people.

In December 1978, to mark the fiftieth anniversary of the Indonesian Women's Congress, Siti was presented with a gold chain. On the forty-fifth Mother's Day, she was honoured by President Suharto for her role in the first Indonesian Women's Congress. In her final years, she lived quietly with her youngest daughter in Yogyakarta. She died there on 31 August 1991.

== Personal life ==
Siti Sukaptinah met her future husband, Soenaryo Mangunpuspito, when they both attended the same school. He was also a member of Jong Java. The pair married in 1929, and Siti Sukaptinah added her husband's name to her own. The marriage lasted 35 years and produced five children. Soenaryo Mangunpuspito died in 1964.

== Bibliography ==
- Kusuma, A.B (2004). Lahirnya Undang-Undang Dasar 1945 : memuat salinan dokumen otentik badan oentoek menyelidiki oesaha2 persiapan kemerdekaan [The Birth of the 1945 Constitution: including copies of the authentic documents of the Investigating Committee for Preparatory Work for Independence] (in Indonesian). Depok, Indonesia: Badan Penerbit Fakultas Hukum Universitas Indonesia. ISBN 979-8972-28-7.
- Kusuma, A.B.; Elson, R.E. (2011), "A note on the sources for the 1945 constitutional debates in Indonesia" (PDF), Bijdragen tot de Taal-, Land- en Volkenkunde, 167 (2–3): 196–209, doi:10.1163/22134379-90003589, ISSN 0006-2294
- Nur Janti (15 August 2017). "Dua Perempuan dalam BPUPKI" [Two Women in the BPUPK [sic]]. Historia magazine. PT. Media Digital Historia.
- Nur Janti (19 January 2019). "Sukaptinah Berjuang Agar Bangsa dan Kaumnya tak Dijajah" [Sukaptinah fought to Stop the Nation and her Kind [women] from being Colonised]. Historia magazine. PT. Media Digital Historia.
- Suratmin; Sri Sutjiatiningsih; G.A. Ohorella; Ernayanti; Suhatno (1991). Biografi Tokoh Kongres Perempuan Indonesia Pertama [Biography of People from the First Indonesian Women's Congress] (PDF) (in Indonesian). Jakarta: Proyek Inventarisasi dan Dokumentasi Sejarah Nasional, Direktorat Sejarah Dan Nilai Tradisional, Departemen Pendidikan dan Kebudayaan.
- Tim Penyusun Sejarah (1970), Seperempat Abad Dewan Perwakilan Rakyat Republik Indonesia [A Quarter Century of the People's Representative Council of the Republic of Indonesia] (PDF) (in Indonesian), Jakarta: Sekretariat DPR-GR, archived from the original (PDF) on 2023-04-07
