= Hurustiati Subandrio =

Indonesian activist and medical doctor

Hurustiati Subandrio circa 1964

Hurustiati Subandrio (c. 1918–1974), in Van Ophuijsen Spelling Hoeroestiati Soebandrio, was an Indonesian physician, politician, anthropologist, and social activist. She held several high-profile roles during the Sukarno era, including being head of Public Health education for the Ministry of Health, president of the Indonesian Women's Congress, and vice-chair of the World Health Organization. She was the wife of Subandrio, a close ally of Sukarno who was Indonesian Minister of Foreign Affairs (1956–1966) and later a political prisoner (1966–1995).

== Biography ==
Hurustiati was born around 1918 in Lawang, East Java, Dutch East Indies, not far from the city of Malang. She was of an elite Javanese background; she was the daughter of the Regent of Pasururan. She studied in a Dutch-language Hogere Burgerschool in Malang and later described herself as withdrawn and interested in poetry during that time. She graduated in 1936.

She started a medical degree in Jakarta (then called Batavia) in 1938, finishing in 1944. In the medical program in 1938, she met Subandrio, also a Javanese of aristocratic background from East Java, and they were married in 1939 or possibly 1940. He also studied medicine was an Indonesian nationalist, and had spent time in prison for his anti-Dutch activities; Hurustiati herself was also said to have been a major influence on his political beliefs. During the Japanese occupation of the Dutch East Indies, they operated a nursing clinic together in Semarang until 1946. It was during that period that they had their only child, a son named Budojo. After the end of the war, during the Indonesian National Revolution, both she and her husband supported the independence movement and were active in clandestine organizations. Her husband was very influenced by Sutan Sjahrir, became a member of his Socialist Party of Indonesia, and was appointed by him to the fledgling republic's Ministry of Information. Despite their nationalistic beliefs, Hurustiati and Subandrio spoke Dutch to one another and continued to do so even after Indonesian independence.

In 1947, her husband was sent to London as a representative of the Indonesian Republican government and she moved there with him, enrolling in postgraduate studies at the London School of Economics in anthropology. She completed a thesis entitled "Javanese peasant life: villages in East Java". While living in London she also wrote and published a book (in Indonesian) about the life of Kartini.

In 1954, Subandrio became the Indonesian ambassador to the Soviet Union, and Hurustiati lived there with him. They were well-regarded by the Soviet leadership and became personal friends of Nikita Khrushchev. Khrushchev was famously impressed by Hurustiati's ability to sing Russian songs during social events at the embassy. Subandrio's diplomatic efforts also gained Soviet support for the Indonesian annexation of Irian Jaya.

When they returned to Indonesia in 1956 she was appointed head of the Public Health section of the Ministry of Health. She enacted programs focusing on basic needs such as sanitation, clean water, postnatal education, training midwives, and the opening of family planning clinics. In 1958 she traveled to Ceylon as a delegate to the Asian-African Women's Conference. She also became head of the Indonesian Family Planning Institute (PKBI, Indonesian: Perkumpulan Keluarga Berencana Indonesia), and during a political reorganization of the Indonesian Women's Congress (Kowani, Kongres Wanita Indonesia) in 1961 she became its head as well.

In 1963 she received an Honorary degree of Doctor of Laws in humanitarian science from the Philippine Women's University.

Following the collapse of the so-called 30 September Movement in 1965 and purges of high-profile leftists in Indonesia, her husband Subandrio started to be sidelined by pro-Army forces, and by November seemed poised to be put on trial or else exiled. Paradoxically, in November Hurustiati led a mass march of Kowani members in favour of anti-Communist repression. Adam Malik later claimed that she did so because of a longstanding feud between himself and the Subandrios over his opposition to Sukarno. Subandrio retained his position as Foreign Minister even after the February 1966 cabinet shuffle, probably due to his closeness to Sukarno. It was only after Supersemar in March 1966 that he lost his position and was arrested; his original death sentence on vague charges was commuted to a life sentence. Hurustiati seems to have been in Switzerland at the time of his arrest and did not herself become a political prisoner even upon her return to Indonesia, although she was removed from her leadership positions in Kowani, the Ministry of Health, and other organizations.

She died in Jakarta on 14 April 1974 at age 54, after a long illness. Her husband was allowed to temporarily leave the prison to see her in the hospital before she died.
