= Subandrio =

Indonesian politician

Air Admiral (Titular) Subandrio
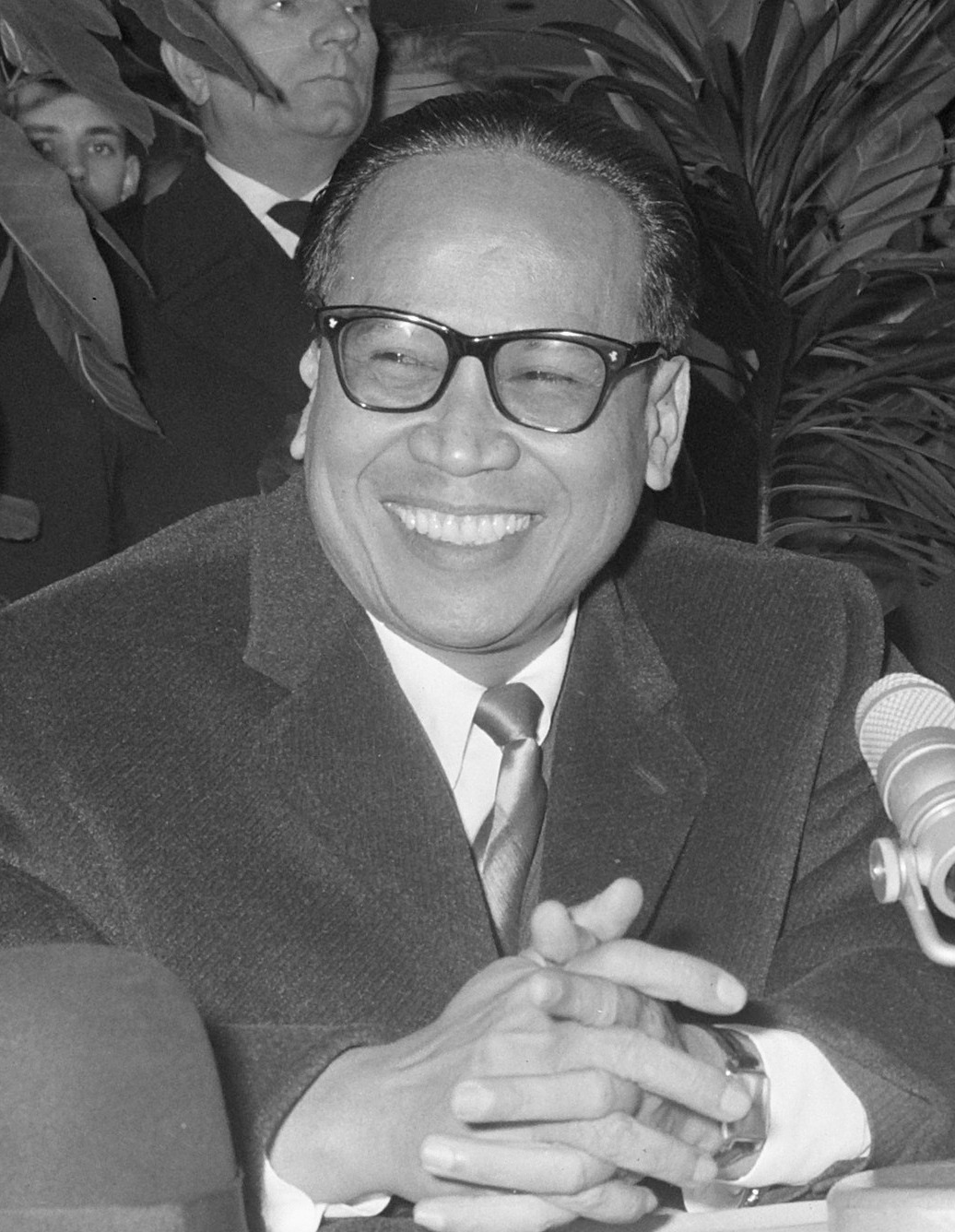
- Subandrio in 1964

10th Minister of Foreign Affairs
- In office 9 April 1957 – 28 March 1966
- President: Sukarno
- Preceded by: Ruslan Abdulgani
- Succeeded by: Adam Malik

1st Ambassador of Indonesia to the United Kingdom
- In office 1949–1954
- President: Sukarno
- Preceded by: Position established
- Succeeded by: Soepomo

Personal details
- Born: 15 September 1914 Malang, Dutch East Indies
- Died: 3 July 2004 (aged 89) Jakarta, Indonesia
- Party: PSI (former member)
- Occupation: Diplomat; politician

Military service
- Allegiance: Indonesia
- Branch: Indonesian Air Force
- Service years: 1945–1964
- Rank: Air admiral (titular)
- Commands: State Intelligence Agency
- Conflict: Indonesian National Revolution

Subandrio (15 September 1914 – 3 July 2004) was an Indonesian politician Foreign Minister and First Deputy Prime Minister of Indonesia under President Sukarno. Removed from office following the failed 1965 coup, he spent 29 years in prison.

The spelling "Subandrio" has been official in Indonesia since 1947 but the older spelling Soebandrio is still sometimes used.

== Early career ==
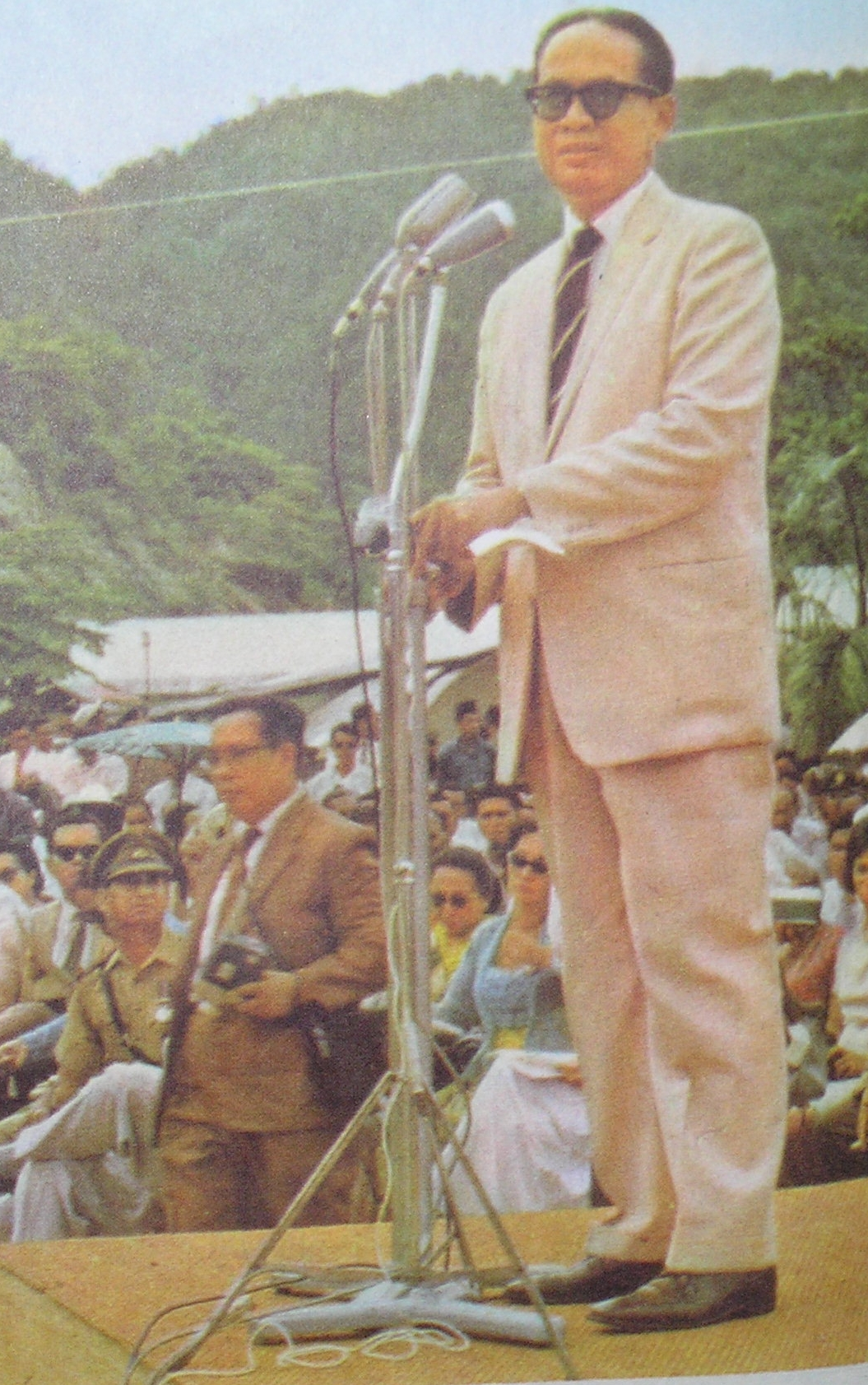
Subandrio at the ceremonies marking the transfer of West New Guinea to Indonesian control on 1 May 1963

Subandrio was born in Malang, East Java, and educated at the Sekolah Tinggi Kedokteran Jakarta (GHS) in Jakarta. As a medical student, he was active in the independence movement. During World War II, while practicing medicine, he worked with anti-Japanese resistance forces. His wife, Hurustiati Subandrio, was also a politically active medical doctor. After the war, he was appointed secretary-general of the information ministry.

After 1945 Subandrio became a supporter of the nationalist leader Sukarno and was sent as Sukarno's special envoy in Europe, establishing an information office in London in 1947. From 1954 to 1956, he was ambassador to the Soviet Union. During this time he developed strong left-wing views, although he was never a Communist as later alleged.

== Cabinet minister ==
In 1956 Sukarno recalled him to Jakarta to become secretary-general of the foreign ministry, and then Foreign Minister. In 1960 he was also made Second Deputy Prime Minister, and in 1962 he was appointed Minister for Foreign Economic Relations. He held all three posts, and also acted as intelligence chief, until 1966.

Subandrio was the main architect of Indonesia's left-wing foreign policy during this period, including the alliance with the People's Republic of China and the policy of "Confrontation" with Malaysia, which created great hostility between Indonesia and the Western powers, particularly the United States and the United Kingdom. He was heavily involved in the Sunda Straits Crisis of 1964 when the British aircraft carrier HMS Victorious passed through Indonesian waters without proper approval.

== Downfall of Sukarno ==
On 30 September 1965 a group of army officers, allegedly supported by the powerful Communist Party of Indonesia (PKI), attacked a part of the Army leadership that was supposedly plotting to overthrow Sukarno. Six Army generals were killed but the alleged "coup attempt" failed. In the resulting anti-communist backlash, an anti-communist General Suharto took control of the government. Sukarno tried to retain Subandrio in the cabinet, but in 1966 he was forced to agree to his dismissal.

Subandrio was sentenced to death by the Extraordinary Military Court on charges of being involved in the "30 September Movement," although there was no real evidence that Subandrio knew of the plot in advance or played any part in it (he was in Sumatra at the time). This sentence was afterward reduced to life imprisonment upon the request of the British government on behalf of Queen Elizabeth, as it was remembered that Subandrio was Indonesia's first envoy to the U.K. He remained in prison until 1995, when he was released due to his advanced age.

He finally received clemency on June 2, 1995 from President Soeharto and was finally released on August 15, 1995 together with Omar Dhani and Soegeng Soetarto, two days before the 50th anniversary of Indonesia's independence. After the fall of the New Order, Soebandrio met President Abdurrahman Wahid on December 21, 2000 to rehabilitate his name, but this was never done. He later recounted his version of historical events in his autobiography entitled Kesaksianku (My Testimony, 2001). Subandrio died on 3 July 2004.

Political offices
Preceded by Ruslan Abdulgani	Foreign minister of Indonesia; 1957–1966	Succeeded by Adam Malik
Diplomatic posts
New title Position established	Ambassador of Indonesia to the United Kingdom; 1949–1954	Succeeded by Soepomo
New title Position established	Ambassador of Indonesia to the Soviet Union; 1954–1956	Succeeded by Lambertus Nicodemus Palar
