= Rendra Kresna =

Indonesian politician

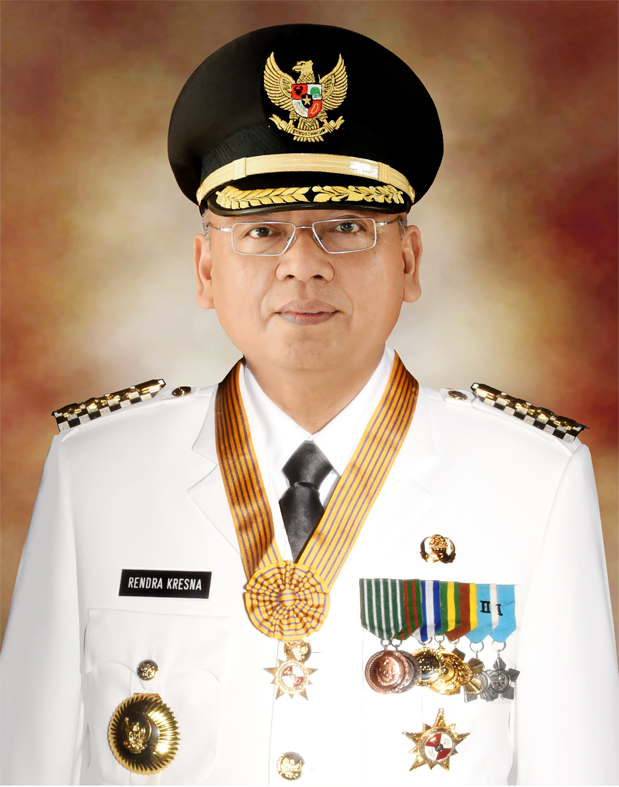
- Official portrait

Regent of Malang
- In office 17 February 2016 – 15 October 2018
- In office 26 October 2010 – 26 October 2015
- Preceded by: Sujud Pribadi
- Succeeded by: Sanusi

Vice Regent of Malang
- In office 2005–2010
- Succeeded by: Ahmad Subhan

Personal details
- Born: 22 March 1962 (age 64) Pamekasan, East Java, Indonesia
- Party: Golkar (1997–2016); Nasdem (2016–2018)

Rendra Kresna (born 22 March 1962) is an Indonesian former politician who was the regent of Malang Regency, East Java between 2010–2015 and 2016–2018. He was elected twice in the 2010 and 2015 regency elections, but his second term was cut short when he was arrested by the Corruption Eradication Commission and sentenced to prison for bribery. He also served Malang's vice regent between 2005 and 2010, and was a member of the regency's Regional House of Representatives.

== Early life ==
Rendra Kresna was born on 22 March 1962 in Pamekasan, on Madura Island, East Java. He received basic education in Pamekasan before enrolling at the economics faculty of Muhammadiyah University Malang, graduating in 1989.

== Career ==
His involvement in politics began in 1997, when he was elected into the Malang Regency Regional House of Representatives as a Golkar member. He then became chairman of Golkar's branch in Malang Regency, while also becoming the provincial chairman of the All Indonesian Workers' Union organization. In 2005, he became the running mate to incumbent regent Sujud Pribadi in the regency election, and was elected. He ran as the regent candidate in the 2010 regency election with Ahmad Subhan as his running mate, and they won with 672,511 votes (62.04%). Kresna and Subhan were sworn in as regent and vice regent on 26 October 2010. Kresna was reelected in the 2015 regency election, winning 605,817 votes (51.6%). His second term began on 17 February 2016.

Kresna moved from Golkar to the NasDem Party in 2016.

== Arrest ==
In 2018, Kresna was designated a suspect of receiving Rp 3.45 billion (~USD 220,000) in bribes for a municipal contract, and the Corruption Eradication Commission arrested him on 15 October 2018, several days after he had resigned from Nasdem due to the investigation. The Surabaya District Court sentenced him to six years in prison on 9 May 2019, and an additional four years was added to his sentence by the Surabaya Anti-Corruption Court. He was released on parole in April 2024 after receiving a remission for good behavior of 14.5 months.

== Family ==
Kresna is married to Jajuk Sulistyowati. Both Jajuk and one of their children, Kresna Dewanata Phrosakh, are also members of the NasDem Party. Phrosakh served in the national House of Representatives for the 2014–2019 and 2019–2024 terms, while Jajuk was elected into the East Java Regional House of Representatives in the 2019 and 2024 elections. Kresna and Jajuk also has a daughter, Kresna Tilotama Phrosakh.
