= Malang metropolitan area =

Region in East Java, Indonesia

Malang metropolitan area Malang Raya
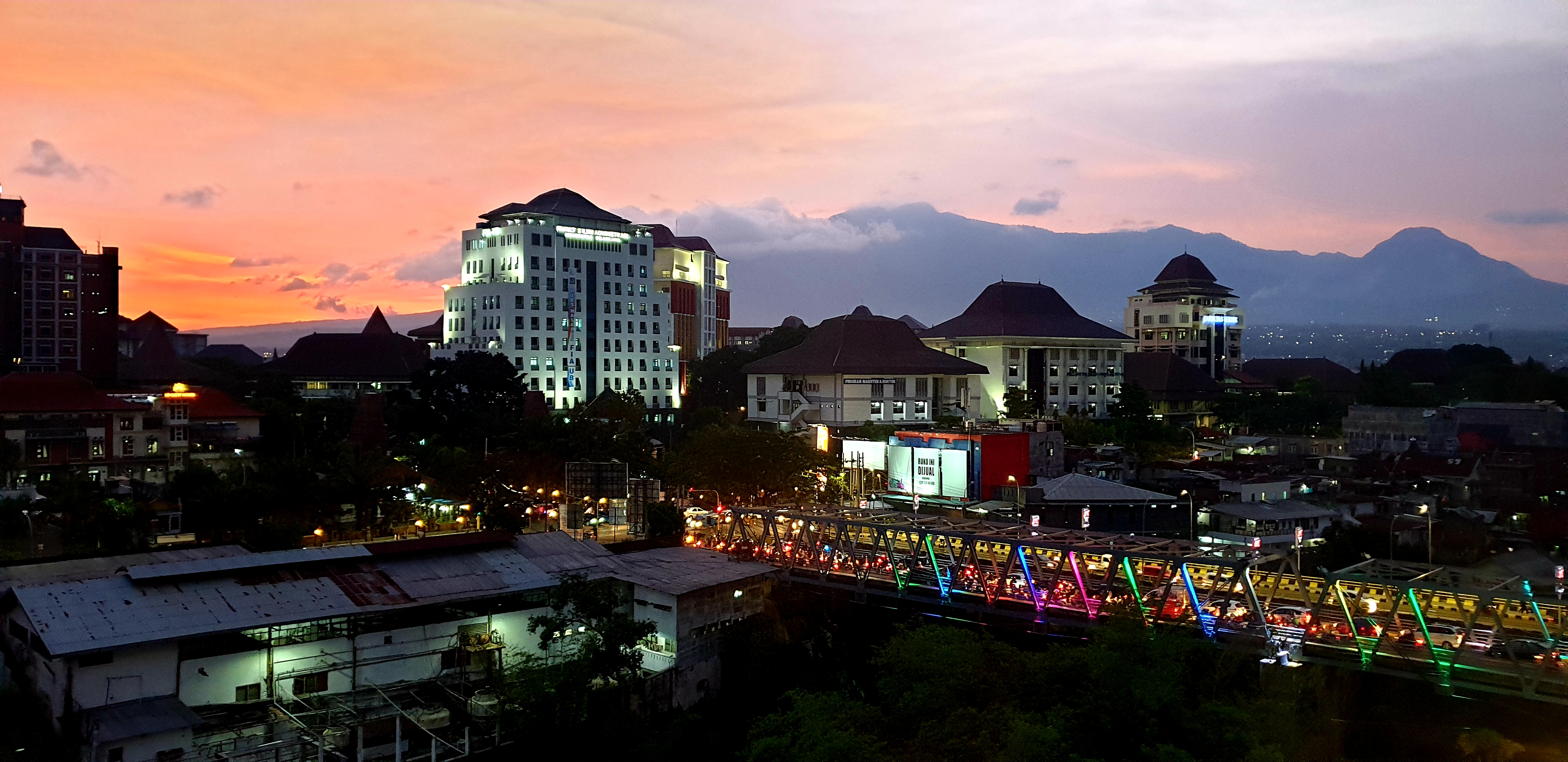
- Malang cityscape at dusk
- Interactive map of Malang metropolitan area
- Coordinates: 8°00′S 112°37′E
- Country: Indonesia
- Province: East Java
- Core city: Malang
- Satellite city: Batu
- Regencies: Malang Regency

Area
  - Total: 2,332.29 km^{2} (900.50 sq mi)

Population (mid 2025 estimate)
  - Total: 3,096,425
  - Density: 1,327.63/km^{2} (3,438.55/sq mi)
- Demonym: Arek Malang or Arema
- Time zone: UTC+7 (Indonesia Western Time)
- Area code: (+62) 341
- Vehicle sign: N
- GDP metro: 2023
- Total: ▲Rp 241.950 trillion ▲US$ 15.873 billion ▲US$ 50.837 billion (PPP)
- Per capita: ▲Rp 63.653 million ▲US$ 4,176 ▲US$ 13,374 (PPP)
- Highest elevation 3,676 m/12,060 ft (Semeru, in Malang Regency)

Greater Malang (Indonesian: Malang Raya) is a region in East Java, Indonesia, encompassing the municipality of Malang and its hinterland. About 3.1 million people in East Java reside in Greater Malang. The principal city, Malang is well known as the home of notable universities in Indonesia, and the nearby Batu (now also an independent city), is well known as a tourism centre in East Java.

== History ==
=== Karesidenan Malang ===
In the Dutch colonial era, Greater Malang was a residency, an old form of second-tier subdivision, called Karesidenan Malang (Malang Residency), consisting of four cities (Malang, Batu, Pasuruan, Probolinggo) and four regencies (Malang Regency, Pasuruan Regency, Probolinggo Regency, Lumajang Regency). But now, the definition of Greater Malang just consists of the Malang highlands area, namely Malang city, Batu city, and Malang Regency, together with one district (kecamatan Purwodadi) of Pasuruan Regency. Even this is excessive, as parts of Malang Regency - the 9 districts in the south (bordering the south coast of East Java) and the 3 districts lying west of Batu city - are not part of the Malang Valley urbanisation. The component parts are tabled below, with their areas, their populations at the 2010 and 2020 Censuses, and the official estimates as at mid 2024.

== Demography ==
Population density of Java and Madura by district as of 2022, with major urban areas shown

Administrative division	Area (km^{2})	Pop'n 2010 Census	Pop'n 2020 Census	Pop'n mid 2025 estimate	Density per km^{2} mid 2025
Malang City	111.08	820,043	843,810	891,859	8,029.2
Batu City	194.17	190,184	213,046	225,408	1,160.9
Malang Regency (part) ^{(a)}	1,924.58	1,686,270	1,829,769	1,905,498	990.1
Pasuruan Regency (part) ^{(b)}	102.46	65,363	70,015	73,660	718.9
Greater Malang	2,332.29	2,761,860	2,956,640	3,096,425	1,327.6

Notes: (a) comprising 21 districts of the regency (Poncokusumo, Wajak, Turen, Bululawang, Gondanglegi, Pagelaran, Kepanjen, Sumberpucung, Kromengan, Ngajum, Wonosari, Wagir, Pakisaji, Tajinan, Tumpang, Pakis, Jabung, Lawang, Singosari, Karangploso and Dau).
(b) comprising one district (Purwodadi).

Sources: Statistics Indonesia

== Geography ==
Greater Malang is located in the middle of East Java, and the eastern part of the region borders on the Eastern salient of Java region. The region covers over 2,332 km^{2}.

The eastern section of Greater Malang, among Java's most rugged regions, isolates the eastern salient from Java's central heartland to its west. The Tengger massif (including Mount Bromo), and Mount Semeru, Java's highest peak, lie in this section. The western area of this region is also a mountainous region, including Arjuno-Welirang and Kawi-Butak. However, those parts of the Regency to the south of Greater Malang are just a lower elevation plain, with the southern coast bordering the Indian Ocean and small karst hills below 1000 metres.

=== Climate ===
While most parts of the region are plateau or highlands (except the southern area), the climate of Greater Malang is milder than the rest of Indonesia. In middle of year, mountainous area of Greater Malang over 2000 metres above sea level, is dry winter with light snow and frost, which means the temperature always below zero Celsius during late night until morning, especially the light snow is commonly visible in Bromo Tengger Semeru National Park.

Climate data for Malang, East Java, Indonesia (elevation 450 m or 1,480 ft)
Month	Jan	Feb	Mar	Apr	May	Jun	Jul	Aug	Sep	Oct	Nov	Dec	Year
Mean daily maximum °C (°F)	28.5 (83.3)	28.5 (83.3)	28.5 (83.3)	28.7 (83.7)	29.0 (84.2)	28.8 (83.8)	28.4 (83.1)	29.3 (84.7)	29.8 (85.6)	30.2 (86.4)	29.5 (85.1)	28.5 (83.3)	29.0 (84.1)
Daily mean °C (°F)	24.0 (75.2)	24.1 (75.4)	24.0 (75.2)	24.0 (75.2)	23.9 (75.0)	23.2 (73.8)	22.4 (72.3)	23.2 (73.8)	23.6 (74.5)	24.3 (75.7)	24.3 (75.7)	23.8 (74.8)	23.7 (74.7)
Mean daily minimum °C (°F)	19.6 (67.3)	19.7 (67.5)	19.5 (67.1)	19.3 (66.7)	18.9 (66.0)	17.7 (63.9)	16.5 (61.7)	17.1 (62.8)	17.5 (63.5)	18.5 (65.3)	19.2 (66.6)	19.1 (66.4)	18.5 (65.4)
Average precipitation mm (inches)	334 (13.1)	307 (12.1)	292 (11.5)	173 (6.8)	132 (5.2)	77 (3.0)	47 (1.9)	26 (1.0)	43 (1.7)	106 (4.2)	225 (8.9)	326 (12.8)	2,088 (82.2)
Average relative humidity (%)	81.7	82.3	82.2	79.2	79.8	77.3	75.1	72.9	70.9	70.9	74.4	79.1	77.1
Source 1: Climate-Data.org (temp & precip)
Source 2: Weatherbase (humidity)

According to the Köppen-Geiger climate classification, the climate of Malang city is tropical monsoon (Am).

Climate data for Tulungrejo, Bumiaji, Batu (elevation 1,200 m or 3,900 ft)
Month	Jan	Feb	Mar	Apr	May	Jun	Jul	Aug	Sep	Oct	Nov	Dec	Year
Mean daily maximum °C (°F)	21.4 (70.5)	21.6 (70.9)	21.6 (70.9)	21.5 (70.7)	21.5 (70.7)	21.2 (70.2)	20.7 (69.3)	21 (70)	21.8 (71.2)	22.2 (72.0)	21.8 (71.2)	21.5 (70.7)	21.5 (70.7)
Daily mean °C (°F)	17.6 (63.7)	17.7 (63.9)	17.8 (64.0)	17.8 (64.0)	17.3 (63.1)	16.9 (62.4)	16.1 (61.0)	16.2 (61.2)	16.9 (62.4)	17.6 (63.7)	17.9 (64.2)	17.6 (63.7)	17.3 (63.1)
Mean daily minimum °C (°F)	13.9 (57.0)	13.9 (57.0)	14.1 (57.4)	13.6 (56.5)	13.2 (55.8)	12.6 (54.7)	11.5 (52.7)	11.4 (52.5)	12 (54)	13.1 (55.6)	14 (57)	13.8 (56.8)	13.1 (55.6)
Average precipitation mm (inches)	406 (16.0)	353 (13.9)	395 (15.6)	242 (9.5)	176 (6.9)	81 (3.2)	52 (2.0)	35 (1.4)	46 (1.8)	130 (5.1)	282 (11.1)	385 (15.2)	2,583 (101.7)
Average relative humidity (%)	81.7	82.3	82.2	79.2	79.8	77.3	75.1	72.9	70.9	70.9	74.4	79.1	77.1
Source 1: Climate-Data.org (temp & precip)
Source 2: Weatherbase (humidity)

Climate data for Ngadas, Malang Regency (elevation 2,071 m or 6,795 ft)
Month	Jan	Feb	Mar	Apr	May	Jun	Jul	Aug	Sep	Oct	Nov	Dec	Year
Mean daily maximum °C (°F)	18.3 (64.9)	18.4 (65.1)	18.6 (65.5)	18.3 (64.9)	18.2 (64.8)	17.8 (64.0)	17.2 (63.0)	17.3 (63.1)	18 (64)	18.5 (65.3)	18.3 (64.9)	18.2 (64.8)	18.1 (64.5)
Daily mean °C (°F)	14.6 (58.3)	14.6 (58.3)	14.9 (58.8)	14.4 (57.9)	14.1 (57.4)	13.6 (56.5)	12.7 (54.9)	12.7 (54.9)	13.4 (56.1)	14.1 (57.4)	14.6 (58.3)	14.5 (58.1)	14.0 (57.2)
Mean daily minimum °C (°F)	10.9 (51.6)	10.8 (51.4)	11.2 (52.2)	10.6 (51.1)	10.1 (50.2)	9.4 (48.9)	8.2 (46.8)	8.2 (46.8)	8.8 (47.8)	9.8 (49.6)	11 (52)	10.9 (51.6)	10.0 (50.0)
Average precipitation mm (inches)	297 (11.7)	328 (12.9)	347 (13.7)	182 (7.2)	108 (4.3)	63 (2.5)	31 (1.2)	15 (0.6)	20 (0.8)	79 (3.1)	159 (6.3)	319 (12.6)	1,948 (76.9)
Source: Climate-Data.org (temp & precip)

According to the Köppen-Geiger climate classification, the climate of Batu city and Upper Greater Malang over 1000 metres above sea level classified as subtropical highland variety(Cwb).

== Panoramas ==
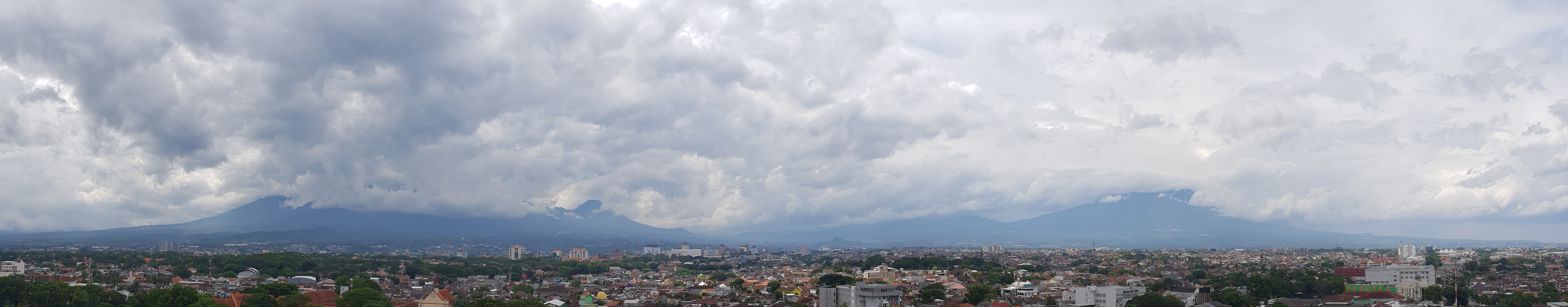
Panorama view of Malang city with Arjuno-Welirang and Kawi Butak mountains covered by Cumulonimbus cloud in January 2019.

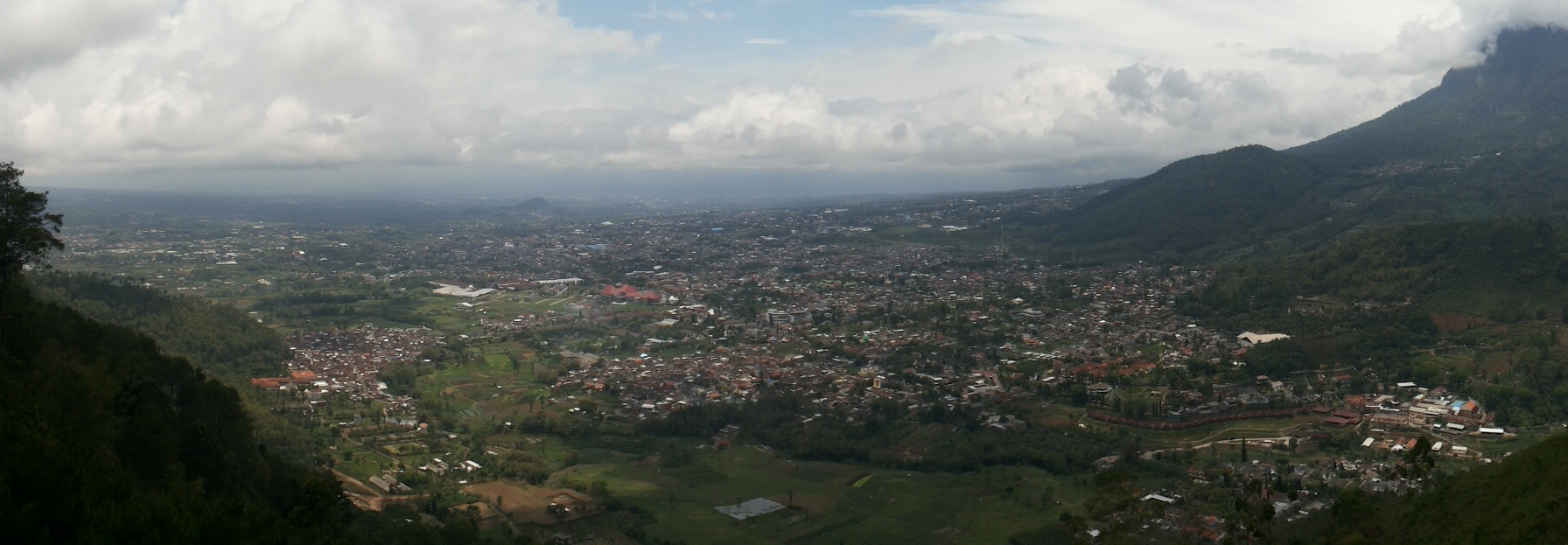
View of Batu from Gunung Banyak

== See also ==
- List of metropolitan areas in Indonesia
- Jakarta metropolitan area
- Surabaya metropolitan area
- Bandung metropolitan area
- Semarang metropolitan area
- Padang metropolitan area
