= Dampit, Malang =

District in East Java, Indonesia

Dampit
- Kecamatan
- Location within Java Location within Indonesia
- Coordinates: 08°12′42″S 112°44′47″E
- Country: Indonesia
- Provinces: East Java
- Regency: Malang
- Villages: 11

Area
  - Total: 135.31 km^{2} (52.24 sq mi)
- Elevation: 575 m (1,886 ft)

Population (mid 2024 estimate)
  - Total: 132,163
  - Density: 976.74/km^{2} (2,529.8/sq mi)
- Time zone: UTC+7 (WIB)
- Postal code: 65181
- Ministry of Home Affairs Code: 35.07.05

Dampit is an administrative district (kecamatan) in the southern part of Malang Regency, East Java, Indonesia. It is situated near the coast of the Indian Ocean, about 36 kilometres southeast of the city of Malang. It had a total population of 127,129 at the 2020 Census; the mid 2024 estimate was 132,163.

== Geography ==
Dampit is located in the southeastern part of Java. It borders Wajak District to its north, Tirto Yudo District to its east and south, Sumbermanjing District to its southwest, and Turen District to its northwest. Indonesian National Route 3 passes through the south of the district. Its average elevation is 575 meters above sea level.

== Climate ==
Dampit has a Tropical Monsoon Climate (Am). On average, its driest month is August, with 42 mm of rainfall; and its wettest month is January, with 394 mm of rainfall.

Climate data for Dampit
Month	Jan	Feb	Mar	Apr	May	Jun	Jul	Aug	Sep	Oct	Nov	Dec	Year
Mean daily maximum °C (°F)	26.9 (80.4)	27.1 (80.8)	27.2 (81.0)	27.2 (81.0)	27.1 (80.8)	26.5 (79.7)	26 (79)	26.3 (79.3)	27.4 (81.3)	28 (82)	27.5 (81.5)	26.9 (80.4)	27.0 (80.6)
Daily mean °C (°F)	23.8 (74.8)	23.9 (75.0)	23.9 (75.0)	23.9 (75.0)	23.5 (74.3)	22.8 (73.0)	22.1 (71.8)	22.1 (71.8)	22.9 (73.2)	23.8 (74.8)	24 (75)	23.8 (74.8)	23.4 (74.0)
Mean daily minimum °C (°F)	21.7 (71.1)	21.7 (71.1)	21.7 (71.1)	21.3 (70.3)	20.6 (69.1)	19.8 (67.6)	19 (66)	18.6 (65.5)	19.6 (67.3)	20.7 (69.3)	21.6 (70.9)	21.8 (71.2)	20.7 (69.2)
Average rainfall mm (inches)	394 (15.5)	364 (14.3)	380 (15.0)	242 (9.5)	121 (4.8)	85 (3.3)	53 (2.1)	42 (1.7)	74 (2.9)	128 (5.0)	301 (11.9)	382 (15.0)	2,566 (101)
Source: Climate-Data.org

== Education ==
There are a total of 90 educational facilities in Dampit. They can be divided into the following categories:

Type	Number	
Type	Public	Private
Primary schools (SD)	48	2
Junior High Schools (SMP)	2	12
Madrasah Ibtidaiyah (MI)	N/A	16
Madrasah Tsanawiyah (MTs)	N/A	10
