= 2024 Malang regency election =

Local election in Indonesia

- 27 November 2024
- Turnout: 60%
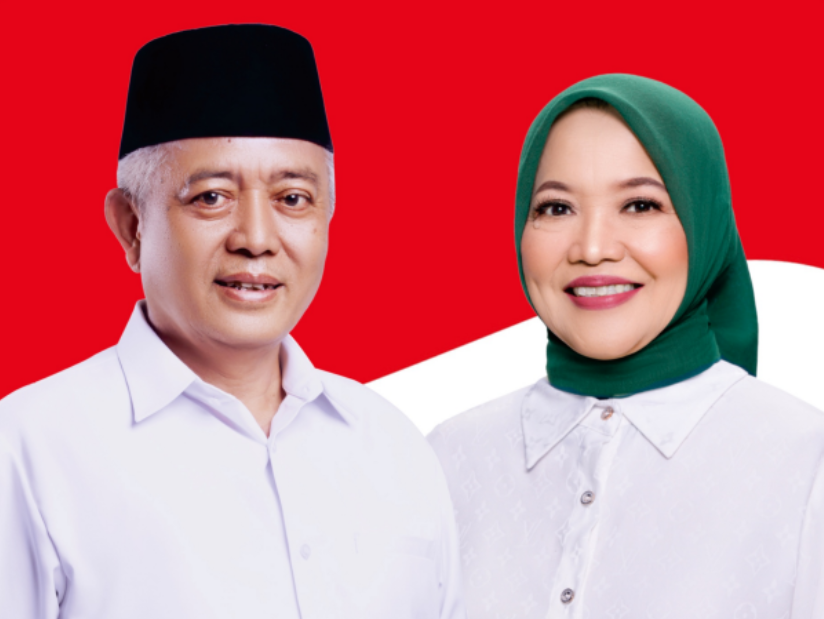

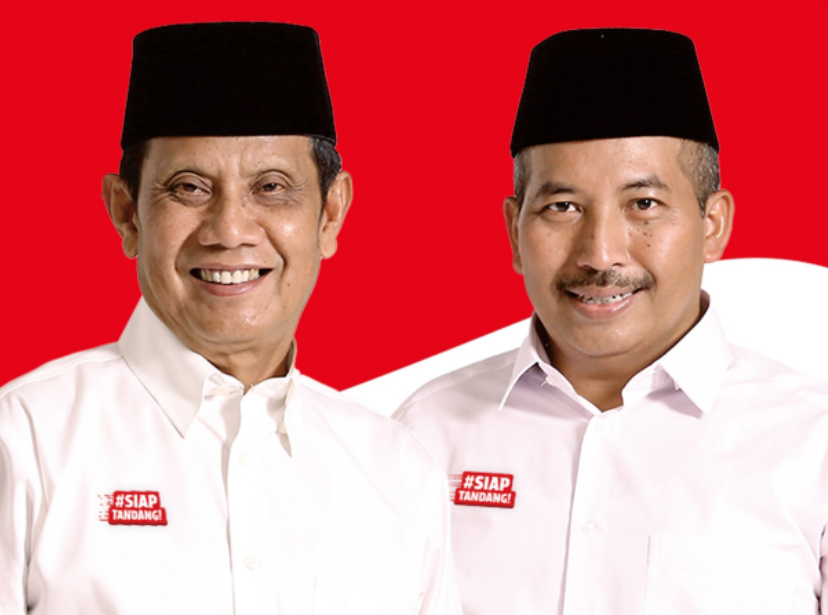
Candidate	Sanusi	Gunawan HS
Party	PDI-P	Golkar
Running mate	Lathifah Shohib	Umar Usman
Popular vote	782,356	399,144
Percentage	66.22%	33.78%
Regent before election
Sanusi
PDI-P
Elected Regent
TBD

The 2024 Malang regency election was held on 27 November 2024 as part of nationwide local elections to elect the regent of Malang Regency for a five-year term. The previous election was held in 2020. Incumbent regent Sanusi of the Indonesian Democratic Party of Struggle successfully won a second term, defeating Golkar-backed candidate Gunawan HS.

== Electoral system ==
The election, like other local elections in 2024, follow the first-past-the-post system where the candidate with the most votes wins the election, even if they do not win a majority. It is possible for a candidate to run uncontested, in which case the candidate is still required to win a majority of votes "against" an "empty box" option. Should the candidate fail to do so, the election will be repeated on a later date.

== Candidates ==
According to electoral regulations, in order to qualify for the election, candidates are required to secure support from a political party or a coalition of parties controlling 10 seats in the Malang Regional House of Representatives (DPRD). From the 2024 Indonesian legislative election, the Indonesian Democratic Party of Struggle and the National Awakening Party won 13 and 11 seats respectively, allowing both parties to nominate candidates without forming a coalition. Candidates may alternatively demonstrate support in form of photocopies of identity cards (i.e. run as an independent), which in Malang's case corresponds to 133,522 copies. No independent candidates registered with the General Elections Commission before the set deadline.

=== Potential ===
The following are individuals who have either been publicly mentioned as a potential candidate by a political party in the DPRD, publicly declared their candidacy with press coverage, or considered as a potential candidate by media outlets:

- Sanusi (PDI-P), incumbent regent.
- Lathifah Sohib (PKB), former member of the House of Representatives and 2020 regency election candidate.
- Kholiq (PKB), member of the East Java Regional House of Representatives and chairman of PKB's Malang Regency branch.

== Political map ==
Following the 2024 Indonesian legislative election, eight political parties are represented in the Malang DPRD:

Political parties	Seat count
Indonesian Democratic Party of Struggle (PDI-P)	13 / 50
National Awakening Party (PKB)	11 / 50
Party of Functional Groups (Golkar)	8 / 50
Great Indonesia Movement Party (Gerindra)	8 / 50
NasDem Party	6 / 50
Prosperous Justice Party (PKS)	2 / 50
Democratic Party (Demokrat)	1 / 50
People's Conscience Party (Hanura)	1 / 50
