= Sanusi (politician) =

Indonesian politician

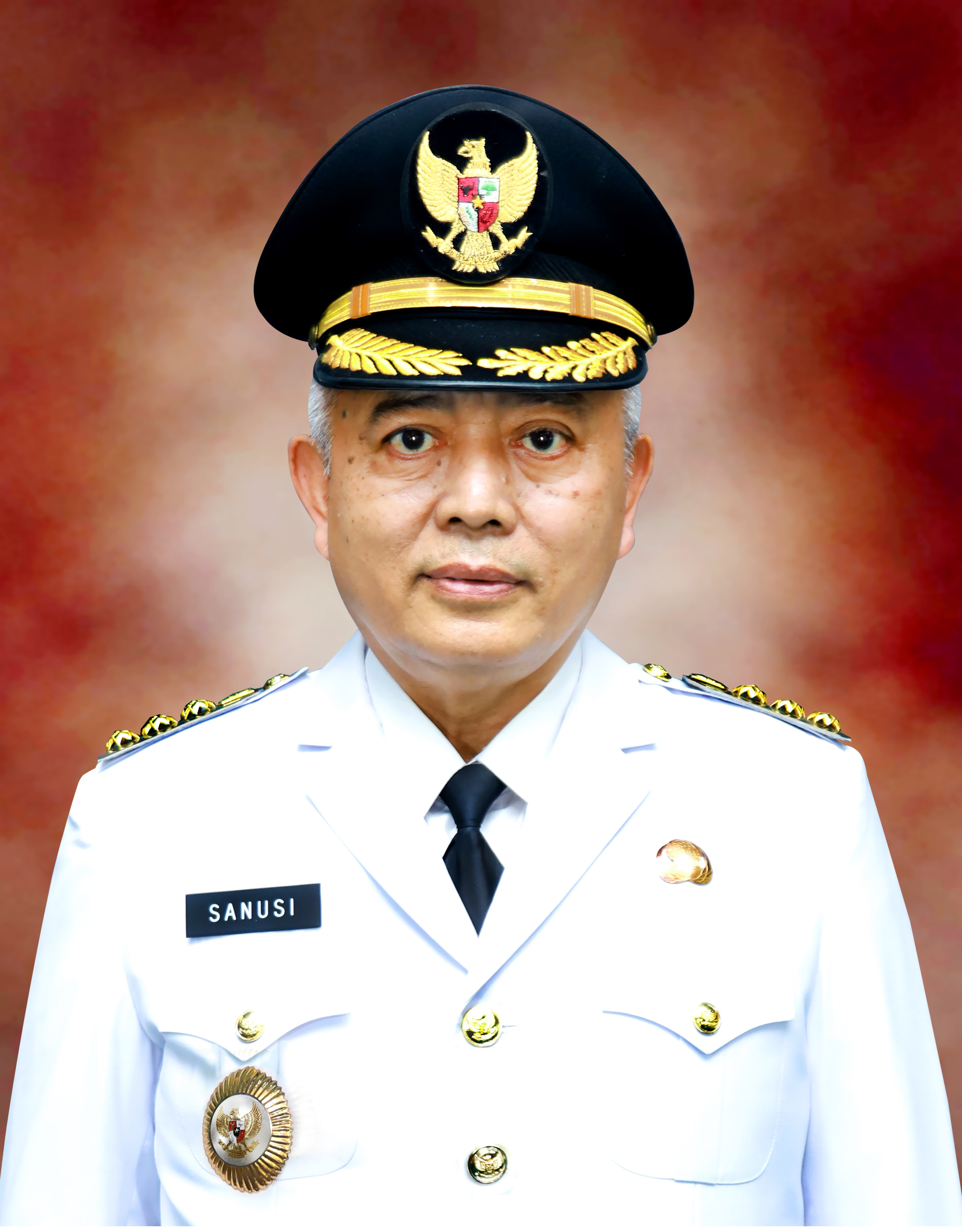
- Official portrait

20th Regent of Malang
- Incumbent
- Assumed office 26 February 2021
- President: Joko Widodo; Prabowo Subianto
- Governor: Khofifah Indar Parawansa; Adhy Karyono (Act.); Khofifah Indar Parawansa
- Vice: Didik Gatot Subroto (2021–2025); Lathifah Shohib (2025–now)
- Preceded by: Wahyu Hidayat (D.E.)
- In office 17 September 2019 – 17 February 2021; Acting: 16 October 2018 – 17 September 2019
- President: Joko Widodo
- Governor: Soekarwo; Khofifah Indar Parawansa
- Preceded by: Rendra Kresna

5th Vice regent of Malang
- In office 17 February 2016 – 15 October 2018
- President: Joko Widodo
- Governor: Soekarwo
- Regent: Rendra Kresna
- Preceded by: Achmad Subhan
- Succeeded by: Didik Gatot Subroto

Personal details
- Born: 20 May 1960 (age 66) Gondanglegi, Malang, East Java, Indonesia
- Party: PKB (1999–2020); PDI-P (2020–present)
- Spouse: Hj. Anis Zaidah Wahyuni
- Children: 4
- Education: IAIN Sunan Ampel (Drs.); Mitra Indonesia College of Economics (M.M.)
- Profession: Politician

M. Sanusi or more familiarly known as Abah Sanusi (born 20 May 1960) is an Indonesian politician of the Indonesian Democratic Party of Struggle who served as Regent of Malang for the 2019–2021, 2021–2025 and 2025–2030 terms. He served for a third term since 20 February 2025 after being inaugurated by President Prabowo Subianto at the Istana Negara, Jakarta. Previously, he served as Vice regent of Malang for the 2016–2019 term. Between 1999 and 2014, he served in the regency's legislature as a member of the National Awakening Party.

== Early life ==
Sanusi was born on 20 May 1960 in Gondanglegi village in Malang Regency. His parents were sugarcane farmers. He studied in his home village, graduating from a teachers' school before later receiving a degree from Sunan Ampel State Islamic Institution in Surabaya, later also receiving a master's degree from an economic institute in Yogyakarta.

== Career ==
After graduating, Sanusi worked as an English teacher at a state-funded Islamic High School at his home village, and was also active in the sugarcane industry. According to Sanusi, his parents and his local kyai initially disallowed him from taking a job as a government employee because duties levied by the government on haram alcohol and prostitution would be included in his salary.

He joined the Nahdlatul Ulama-affiliated GP Ansor organization, by 1998 becoming its leader at Gondanglegi. The following year, he became chairman of the National Awakening Party (PKB; also Nahdlatul Ulama affiliated) in Gondanglegi. Sanusi ran for a seat in the Malang Regency Regional House of Representatives (DPRD) in the 1999 election, and was elected, becoming head of PKB's parliamentary group. He was reelected for his second and third terms in 2004 and 2009, during which he became deputy speaker of the DPRD. By 2010, he was chairman of PKB's branch in Malang Regency.

In the 2015 regency election, he ran as the running mate of Rendra Kresna, and the pair won with 605,817 votes (51.6%). They were sworn in on 17 February 2016. On 15 October 2018, Kresna was arrested by the Corruption Eradication Commission under bribery charges, and Sanusi became acting regent the following day. Sanusi was sworn in as full regent on 17 September the following year.

Sanusi initially registered to run for a full term in the 2020 regency election as a PKB member, but as PKB refused to endorse him, he moved to the Indonesian Democratic Party of Struggle. He proceeded to win the election with Didik Gatot Subroto as running mate, securing 530,449 votes (45.5%) in a three-way race. They were sworn in on 26 February 2021. As regent, Sanusi has ordered a review into recipients of a municipally-funded free healthcare program on top of the national healthcare program, claiming that the program's cost was five times the regency government's capability of funding it. He also signed the regency on for a pilot project to eliminate plastic waste.

After completing his first term as Regent of Malang in the 2020 Indonesian local elections, he ran again as Regent of Malang paired with his former rival and PKB politician, Lathifah Shohib in the 2024 Malang regency election. In this second term, they were supported by a coalition of PDI Perjuangan, PKB, Gerindra Party, NasDem Party, and 7 non-parliamentary political parties, successfully winning in 32 of the 33 sub-districts by gaining the support of 782.356 votes or 66,22 percent of the total valid votes. They were then appointed by the Malang Regency KPU as the elected regent and deputy regent on Thursday, 6 February 2025.

== Family ==
He is married to Anis Zaidah Wahyuni, and they have four children.

Political offices
Preceded by Rendra Kresna	Regent of Malang; 2019–2021, 2021–2025, 2025–present	Succeeded by Incumbent
Preceded by Achmad Subhan	Vice regent of Malang; 2016–2018	Succeeded by Didik Gatot Subroto
