= Singosari =

District in Malang Regency, Indonesia

Coordinates: 7°53′33″S 112°39′57″E

- District
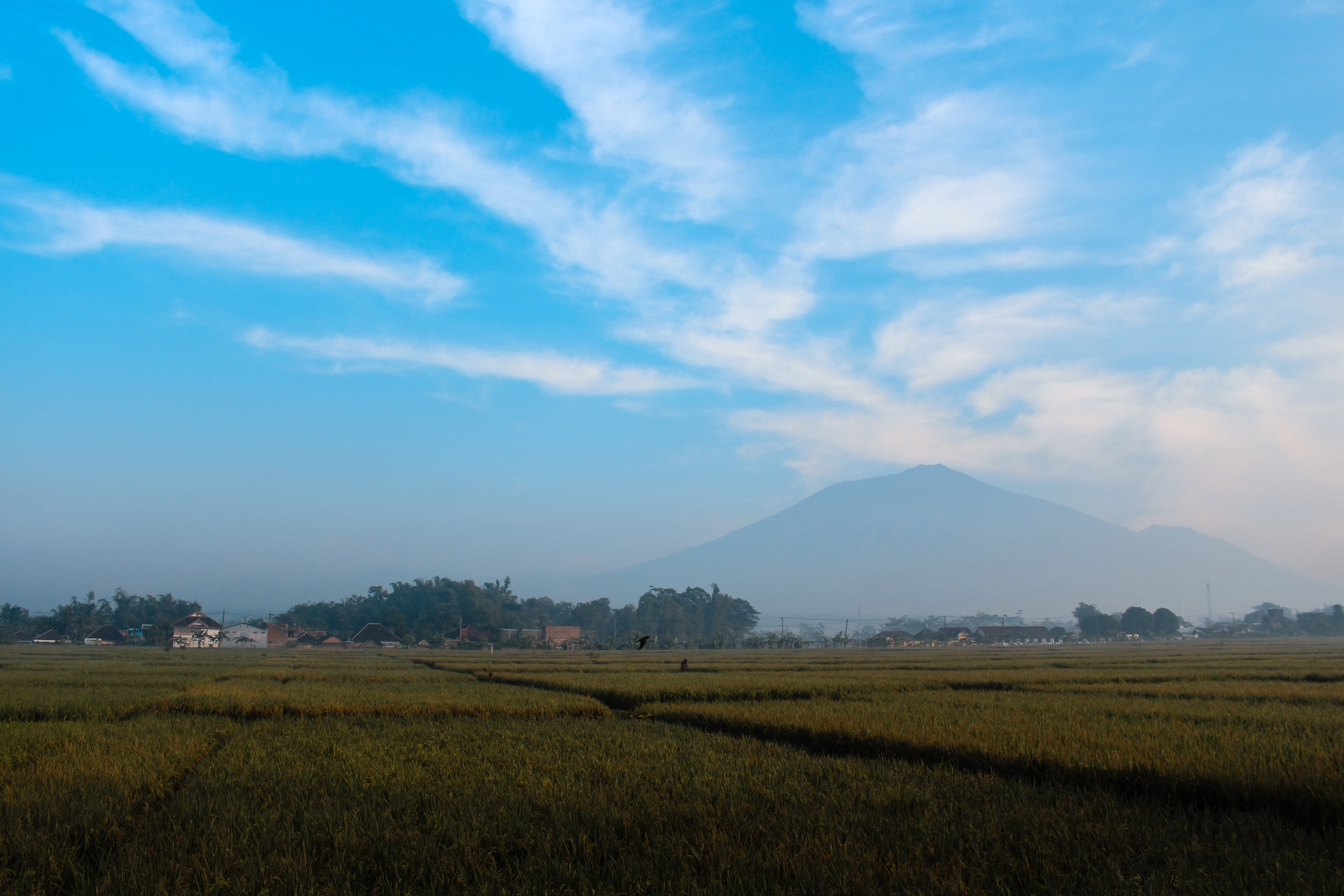
- Mount Arjuno that can be seen from Singosari.
- Interactive map of Singosari
- Country: Indonesia
- Province: East Java
- City: Malang Regency

Government
  - Camat: Agus Nuraji

Area
  - Total: 113.74 km^{2} (43.92 sq mi)

Population (mid 2024 estimate)
  - Total: 182,656
- Time zone: UTC+7 (Western Indonesian Time)
- Website: singosari.malangkab.go.id

Singosari is a district in Malang Regency, East Java Province, Indonesia. It covers an area of 118.51 km^{2} and had a population of 165,357 at the 2010 Census and 180,050 at the 2020 Census; the official estimate as at mid 2024 was 182,656. It is situated about 400 m above sea-level, and is therefore quite cool especially from June to August. Temperature hovers around 18–20 degrees Celsius at night.

== History ==
The name Singosari is derived from Singhasari, a famous Javanese medieval kingdom (1222–1292), which palace located not far away from modern Singosari District. Candi Singhasari (Singosari temple) - which was used as worship palace during this kingdom - is located in Kertanegara street, about 3 km (1.9 mi) from Singosari market.

== Economy and demography ==
It is predominantly occupied by Javanese with smaller number of Madurese, Chinese, Arabs and other groups. Singosari district is located on the main highway connecting Surabaya, the capital of East Java province, and Malang city. The main activity is at the Singosari market. A small airport, Abdul Rachman Saleh, has been constructed to facilitate air travel between Malang and Jakarta.

== Interesting places ==
There are a couple of places of interest in Singosari such as the Candi Singhasari, dated to the 13th century, Sumberawan stupa and the 3339 m high Mount Arjuno. It is a moderate 2 day climb including the return trip. There are also natural springs in the area.

Further to the west from this temple is Ken Dedes swimming pool, believed to be the bathing place and royal garden of Singhasari. Upon entering this pool complex there are 2 big statues called Dwarapala at each side of the entrance. Dwarapala is a squatting giant holding big staff as a weapon, symbolizing the guard of holy places in Javanese culture.
