= Malang Regency =

Regency in East Java, Indonesia

Malang Regency Kabupaten Malang
- Regency

Other transcription(s)
  - Javanese: Malang (Gêdrig) مالاڠ (Pégon) ꦩꦭꦁ (Hånåcåråkå)
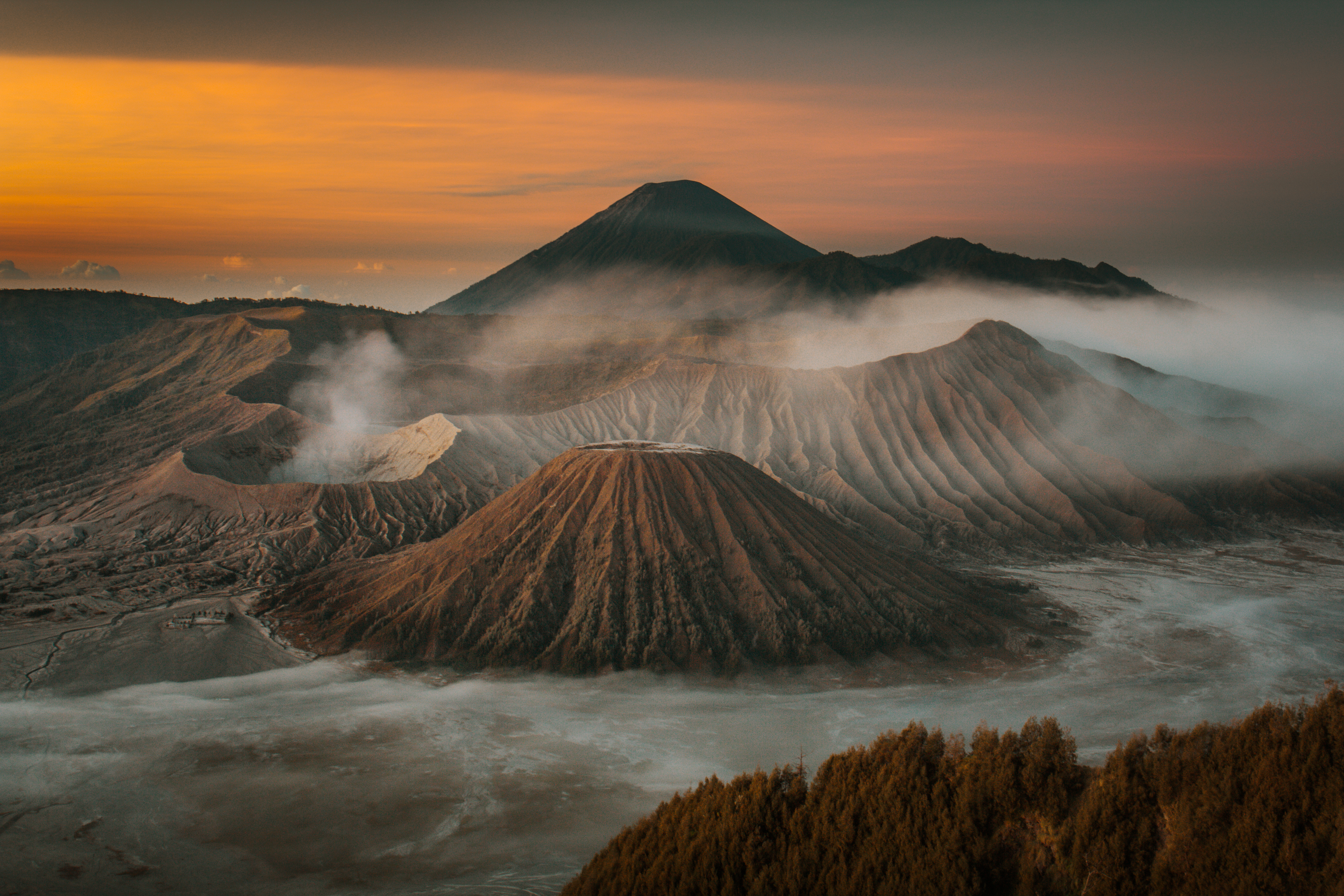
- A view of Bromo Tengger Semeru National Park

- Coat of arms
- Motto(s): Satata Gama Karta Raharja (Javanese) ꦱꦠꦠꦒꦩꦏꦂꦠꦫꦲꦂꦗ (Arranging all things towards prosperity)
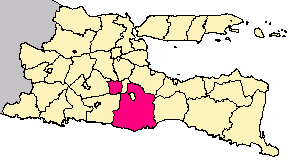
- Location within East Java

- Location in Java and Indonesia Malang Regency (Indonesia)
- Coordinates: 7.9797°S 112.6304°E
- Country: Indonesia
- Province: East Java
- Capital: Kepanjen

Government
  - Regent: Sanusi
  - Vice Regent: Lathifah Shohib

Area
  - Total: 3,530.65 km^{2} (1,363.19 sq mi)

Population (mid 2025 estimate)
  - Total: 2,778,932
  - Density: 787.088/km^{2} (2,038.55/sq mi)
- Time zone: UTC+7 (IWST)
- Area code: (+62) 341
- Website: malangkab.go.id

Malang Regency (Javanese: ꦩꦭꦁ; Pegon: مالاڠ; Osob Kiwalan: Ngalam) is the second largest regency in East Java, Indonesia, with a total area of 3,530.65 km (2,193.84 mi). It is rich in potential for agriculture, medicinal plants and tourism.

It had a population of 2,446,218 people at the 2010 census and 2,654,448 at the 2020 Census; the official estimate as at mid 2025 was 2,778,932. These figures do not include the areas and populations of the two autonomous cities of Malang and Batu which lie geographically within the regency, but are administratively independent. The capital of the regency is the town of Kepanjen.

Most of the population resides in the Greater Malang (Malang Raya) area, a metropolitan area that includes the cities of Malang and Batu and 21 other districts within the regency (plus one other adjacent district in Pasuruan Regency) in a valley between and south of the two cities. The distance between Malang and Batu is approximately 20 km. This metropolitan area covers 2,332.29 km^{2}; it had a population of 2,325,109 at the 2010 census, rising to 3,096,425 as at the mid 2025 official estimates, with an average density of 1,327.6 per km^{2} (5,016/sq mile).

== History ==
Historical and archaeological records from Hindu temples suggest that the Kanjuruhan Kingdom emerged in the region during the 8th and 9th centuries. An inscription on the Dinoyo shrine at Badhut places the shrine's inauguration on Friday, Legi 1st, Margasirsa 682 Saka in the Javanese calendar or November 28, 760 AD.

At one time, the Kanjuruhan kingdom was under the leadership of Akuwu Singhasari Ametung, who was married to Ken Dedes. At that time the Kingdom was under the rule of the Kingdom of Kediri, and the Singhasari Government Center was in Tumapel. Only after Ken Arok killed Akuwu Ametung and married Ken Dedes did the centre of control move to the Malang Kingdom, and this only after defeating the Kingdom of Kediri. Kediri at that time fell into the hands of Singhasari.

During its peak, the Mataram kingdom fell into the hands of Mataram, as well as the Kingdom of Majapahit. The government moved to Demak as Islam was introduced, brought by the Wali Songo. The government was then under the reign of Duke Ronggo Tohjiwo. In the time of the collapse, according to folklore, legendary heroes appeared against Raden Panji Pulongjiwo. He was caught by Mataram soldiers in the village now called Kepanjen Panggungrejo (Kepanji's). The destruction of the town was known as Malang Kutho Bedhah.

In the era of the Dutch East India Company, Malang was a base for the Trunojoyo resistance (1674-1680) against the Company-assisted Mataram. In the early nineteenth century, the government was headed by the Governor-General. The first Malang Regent was Raden Tumenggung Notodiningrat. He was appointed by the Dutch government by resolution of the Governor-General on 9 May 1820.

Since 1984, Malang Regency Hall has had a traditional ceremony, dating from the time of the Kanjuruhan Kingdom, wherein attendees are encouraged to wear traditional costumes of Malang.

== Administrative districts ==
The Malang Regency is divided into thirty-three districts (kecamatan), listed below with their areas and their populations at the 2010 census and the 2020 census, together with the official estimates as at mid 2025. The table also includes the locations of the district administrative centres, the number of administrative villages (totaling 378 rural desa and 12 urban kelurahan) and offshore islands in each district, and its post codes.

The most southernly nine districts - those listed first in the table below, all having a coastline on the Indian Ocean (except Dampit, Kalipare and Pagak Districts), together comprise 36% of the regency's area but have only 25.5% of its population. The next-listed 21 districts comprise the entirety of the urbanised Malang Valley, including the more rural districts to the east; these districts, together with the two cities (Malang and Batu), plus one district (kecamatan Purwodadi) of Pasuruan Regency, constitute the Malang Metropolitan Area. The last-mentioned 3 districts, which all lie west of Batu city, are almost completely physically separated by Batu from the rest of Malang Regency; they cover 9.5% of the regency area, with just 5.95% of its population in mid 2025.

Kode Wilayah	Name of District (kecamatan)	Area in km^{2}	Pop'n Census 2010	Pop'n Census 2020	Pop'n Estimate mid 2025	Admin centre	No. of villages (desa and Kelurahan)	No. of islands	Post code
35.07.01	Donomulyo	192.60	61,840	67,433	70,507	Donomulyo	10	14	65187
35.07.11	Kalipare	105.39	60,834	67,624	71,352	Kalipare	9	-	65166
35.07.02	Pagak	90.08	45,429	49,724	53,862	Pagak	8	-	65168
35.07.03	Bantur	157.15	68,069	75,855	80,233	Bantur	10	10	65179
35.07.29	Gedangan	130.55	52,020	57,052	60,996	Sumbernanas	8	4	65178
35.07.04	Sumbermanjing Wetan	239.31	89,807	98,647	106,205	Argotirto	15	49	65178
35.07.05	Dampit	135.31	118,273	127,129	134,579	Dampit	12 ^{(a)}	-	65181
35.07.30	Tirtoyudo	141.96	59,894	65,571	60.469	Tlogosari	13	17	65182 & 65183
35.07.06	Ampelgading	79.60	52,691	57,868	60,913	Tirtomarto	13	5	65183
	Southern sector	1,271.95	608,857	666,903	708,116		98	94	
35.07.07	Poncokusumo	102.99	91,833	96,183	102,047	Wonorejo	17	-	65157
35.07.08	Wajak	94.56	79,614	86,447	91,394	Wajak	13	-	65173
35.07.09	Turen	63.90	111,708	121,397	128,198	Turen	17 ^{(b)}	-	65175
35.07.14	Bululawang	49.36	68,647	70,567	74,413	Bululawang	14	-	65171
35.07.10	Gondanglegi	79.74	81,495	87,124	91,792	Gondanglegi Kulon	14	-	65174
35.07.33	Pagelaran	45.83	65,491	73,243	78,088	Pagelaran	10	-	65170
35.07.13	Kepanjen	46.25	102,621	110,649	116,704	Kepanjen	18 ^{(c)}	-	65163
35.07.12	Sumberpucung	35.90	51,297	57,314	59,376	Sumberpucung	7	-	65160
35.07.31	Kromengan	38.63	38,005	42,148	43,606	Kromengan	7	-	65165
35.07.20	Ngajum	60.12	48,157	52,197	55,153	Ngajum	9	-	65164
35.07.32	Wonosari	48.53	40,783	45,900	46,141	Wonosari	8	-	65161
35.07.21	Wagir	75.43	80,013	89,645	92,101	Gondowangi	12	-	65158
35.07.19	Pakisaji	38.41	82,215	91,844	94,442	Pakisaji	12	-	65162
35.07.15	Tajinan	40.11	51,818	56,506	59,792	Tajinan	12	-	65172
35.07.16	Tumpang	72.09	74,414	78,234	81,819	Tumpang	15	-	65156
35.07.18	Pakis	57.62	135,757	150,437	154,736	Pakisjajar	15	-	65154
35.07.17	Jabung	135.89	71,567	74,311	79,924	Sukolilo	15	-	65155
35.07.25	Lawang	68.23	103,402	110,981	114,780	Lawang	12 ^{(d)}	-	65211- 65218
35.07.24	Singosari	118.51	165,357	180,050	185,640	Pagentan	17 ^{(e)}	-	65153
35.07.23	Karangploso	58.74	74,585	85,056	85,568	Girimoyo	9	-	65152
35.07.22	Dau	41.96	67,491	70,996	69,782	Mulyoagung	10	-	65151
	Malang Valley sector	1,924.58	1,686,270	1,829,769	1,905,498		263	-	
35.07.26	Pujon	130.75	65,268	68,653	72,477	Pandesari	10	-	65391
35.07.27	Ngantang	147.70	55,711	58,176	60,565	Kaumrejo	13	-	65392
35.07.28	Kasembon	55.67	30,112	30,947	32,278	Kasembon	6	-	65393
	Northwestern sector	334.12	151,091	157,776	165,320		29	-	
	Regency Totals	3,530.65	2,446,218	2,654,448	2,778,932	Kepanjen	390	94	

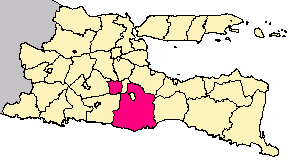
Malang in East Java.

Notes: (a) including one kelurahan - Dampit. (b) including 2 kelurahan - Sedayu and Turen. (c) including 4 kelurahan - Ardirejo, Cepokomulyo, Kepanjen and Penarukan.
(d) including 2 kelurahan - Kalirejo and Lawang. (e) including 3 kelurahan - Candirenggo, Losari and Pagentan.

== Government ==
The Regent of Malang is the highest-ranking official within the Malang Regency government. He reports to the Governor of East Java. The current regent or regional head of Malang Regency is Sanusi, with Lathifah Shohib as vice regent. They both took office on 20 February 2025.

== Tourism ==
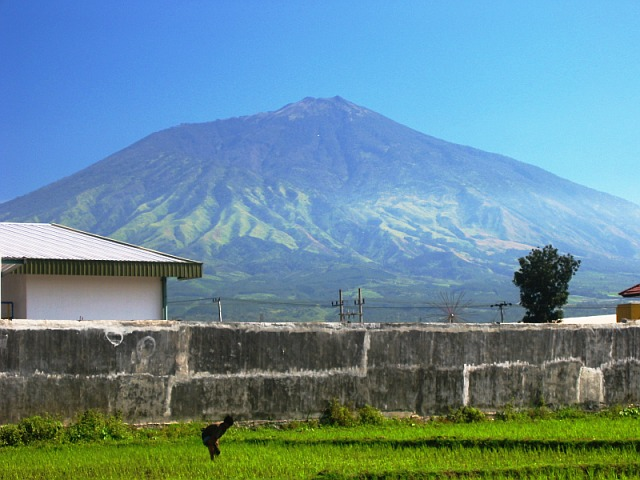
Mount Arjuno viewed from Singosari

Balekambang Beach is 70 km (43 mi) south of Malang and 2 km (1.2 mi) long. Pantai Bajul Mati beach is between Balekambang Beach and Sendang Biru Beach. The name means "Dead Crocodile" due to a rock in the sea shaped like a crocodile. Batu Bengkung Beach is near Bajul Mati Beach and has a natural pool trap by the sand dunes.

== Climate ==
Malang Regency has a tropical monsoon climate (Am) with moderate to little rainfall from June to September and heavy to very heavy rainfall from October to May. The following climate data is for the town of Kepanjen.

Climate data for Kepanjen
Month	Jan	Feb	Mar	Apr	May	Jun	Jul	Aug	Sep	Oct	Nov	Dec	Year
Mean daily maximum °C (°F)	28.1 (82.6)	28.3 (82.9)	28.4 (83.1)	28.5 (83.3)	28.7 (83.7)	28.7 (83.7)	28.5 (83.3)	28.9 (84.0)	29.6 (85.3)	29.8 (85.6)	29.0 (84.2)	28.4 (83.1)	28.7 (83.7)
Daily mean °C (°F)	23.6 (74.5)	23.9 (75.0)	23.8 (74.8)	23.7 (74.7)	23.5 (74.3)	23.0 (73.4)	22.4 (72.3)	22.6 (72.7)	23.3 (73.9)	23.8 (74.8)	23.7 (74.7)	23.6 (74.5)	23.4 (74.1)
Mean daily minimum °C (°F)	19.2 (66.6)	19.5 (67.1)	19.3 (66.7)	19.0 (66.2)	18.4 (65.1)	17.4 (63.3)	16.3 (61.3)	16.4 (61.5)	17.0 (62.6)	17.9 (64.2)	18.5 (65.3)	18.8 (65.8)	18.1 (64.6)
Average rainfall mm (inches)	344 (13.5)	284 (11.2)	302 (11.9)	215 (8.5)	153 (6.0)	102 (4.0)	69 (2.7)	38 (1.5)	50 (2.0)	154 (6.1)	251 (9.9)	359 (14.1)	2,321 (91.4)
Source: Climate-Data.org
