= Tourism in Indonesia =

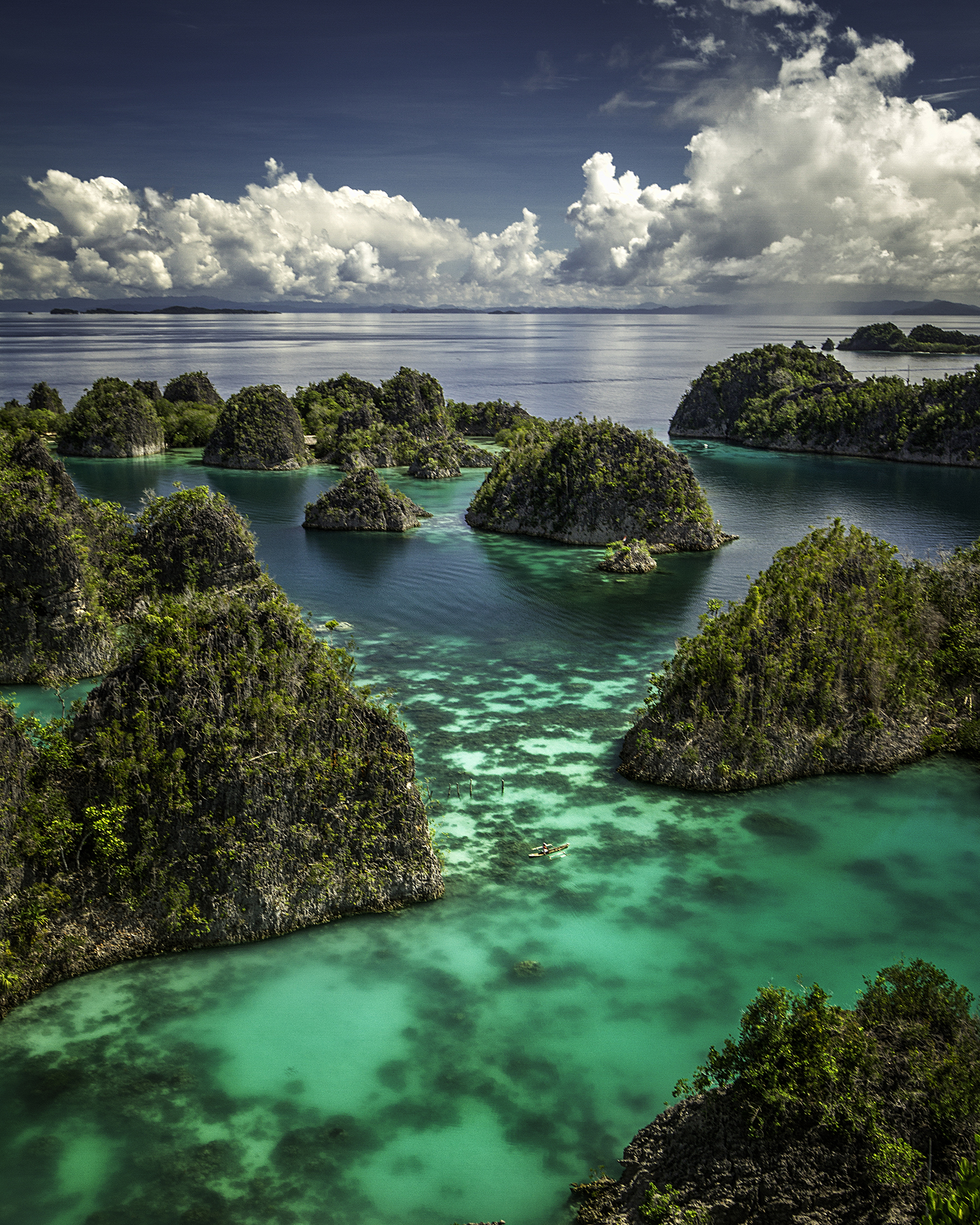
Piaynemo karst archipelago in Raja Ampat, Southwest Papua

Tourism in Indonesia is an important component of the Indonesian economy, as well as a significant source of its foreign exchange revenues. Indonesia ranked 20th in the world tourist industry in 2017, and ninth-fastest among all countries in tourist-sector growth, third-fastest in Asia and fastest in Southeast Asia. In 2018, Denpasar, Jakarta and Batam were among the ten cities globally with the fastest tourism growth at 32.7%, 29.2% and 23.3% respectively. Tourism ranked as the fourth-largest export earner among goods and services sectors.

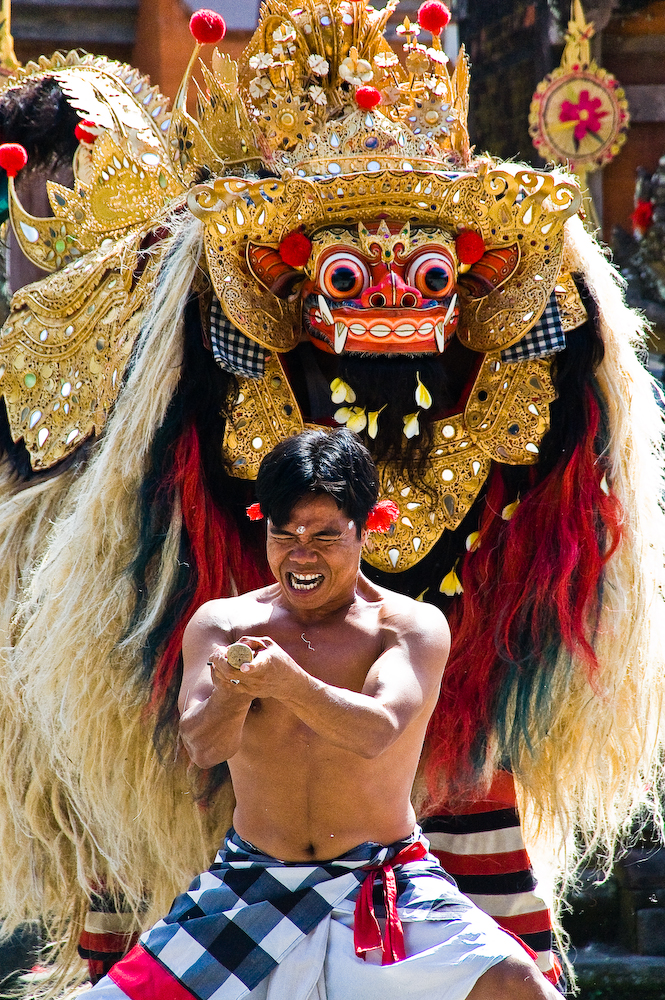
Indonesia possesses a diverse range of traditions, such as this Barong dance performance in Bali.

In 2019, Indonesia recorded 16.10 million foreign tourist arrivals, seeing a 1.9% increase from 2018. In 2015, 9.73 million international visitors entered Indonesia, staying in hotels for an average of 7.5 nights and spending an average of US$1,142 per person during their visit, or $152.22 per person per day. Singapore, Malaysia, China, Australia, and Japan are the top five sources of visitors to Indonesia.

The Travel and Tourism Development Index 2024 ranks Indonesia 22nd out of 119 countries overall with a Travel and Tourism Competitiveness Index score of 4.46. This is an improvement for the Indonesian tourism sector. In 2019, Indonesia ranked 40th out of 140 countries overall with an index score of 4.3. This is also an improvement from Indonesia's 2017 position of 42nd out of 136 countries overall with an index score of 4.2. The 2015 report ranked the price competitiveness of Indonesia's tourism sector 3rd out of 141 countries. The report mentions that Indonesia scored well in the 'T&T Policy and Enabling Conditions' subindex (ranked 9th). The country also scores highly on natural and cultural resources (ranked 17th). However, the country scored poorly in the infrastructure subindex (ranked 75th), as some aspects of tourist service infrastructure are underdeveloped.

In 2016, the Indonesian government was reported to be investing more in tourism development by attracting more foreign investors. The government has given priority to 10 areas as follows: Borobudur, Central Java; Mandalika, West Nusa Tenggara; Labuan Bajo, East Nusa Tenggara; Bromo-Tengger-Semeru, East Java; Thousand Islands, Jakarta; Lake Toba, North Sumatra; Wakatobi, Southeast Sulawesi; Tanjung Lesung, Banten; Morotai, North Maluku; and Tanjung Kelayang, Bangka Belitung Islands. As quoted in the newspaper The Jakarta Post, the government is aiming for 275 million trips from domestic tourists by the end of 2019. The government has also secured commitments from potential investors, totalling $70 million for building accommodations, marinas and ecotourism facilities in 3 of the prioritised 10 areas. Indonesia was ranked seventh among travel publisher Lonely Planet's top 10 countries to visit in 2019. The country ranked fourth among the top 25 destinations in the world in 2018 by the travel site TripAdvisor.

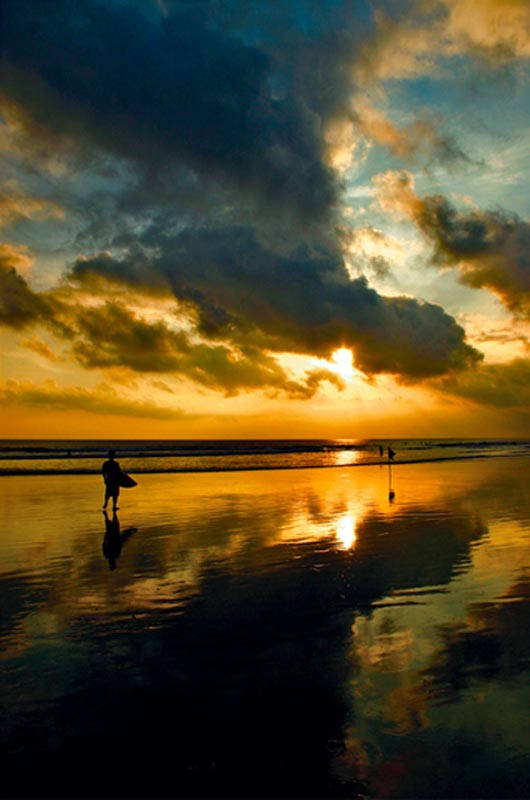
Jimbaran Beach, Bali

== Overview ==
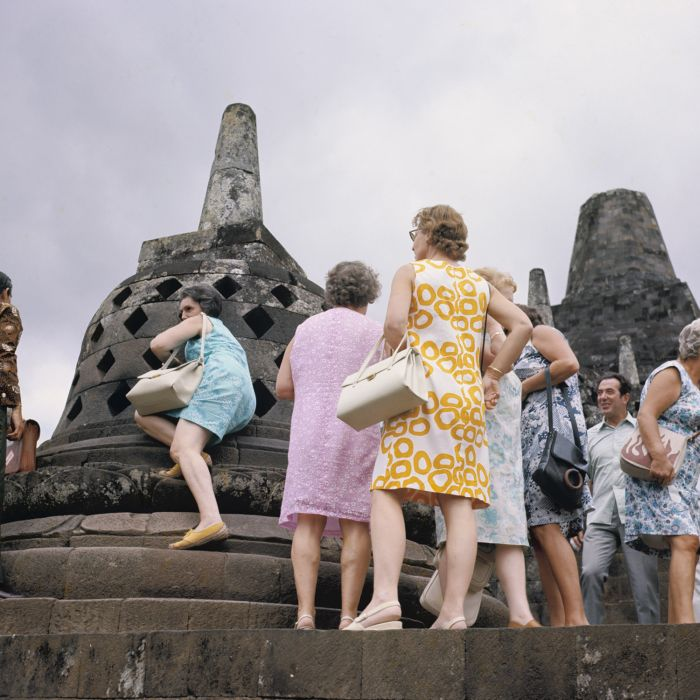
Borobudur is the single most visited tourist attraction in Indonesia.

Indonesia's tourism industry benefits from a tropical climate, a large archipelago of 17,508 islands, 6,000 of them inhabited, and the world's second-longest shoreline (54,716 km) after Canada. Indonesia is the world's largest and most populous country situated entirely on islands. The beaches in Bali, the diving sites in Bunaken, Mount Bromo in East Java, Lake Toba and various national parks in Sumatra – all are popular scenic destinations. Indonesia is culturally diverse, with 719 living languages used across the archipelago. The ancient Prambanan and Borobudur temples, Toraja, Yogyakarta, Minangkabau and Bali (with its many Hindu festivities) are popular destinations for cultural tourism.

Indonesia belongs to the Pacific Asia Travel Association (PATA) and hosted its annual conference in 1963 and 1974 in Jakarta, and in 2003 in Bali. Indonesia also hosted the PATA Travel Mart in 1985 and 1989 in Bali, and in 2016 in Jakarta.

Tourism in Indonesia is overseen by the Indonesian Ministry of Tourism. International tourism campaigns have focused on the country's tropical coastlines and cultural heritage sites. Resort infrastructure has been developed in several popular destinations, particularly Bali. The integration of cultural affairs and tourism under a single ministry shows that cultural tourism is considered an integral part of Indonesia's tourism industry, and conversely, that tourism is used to promote and preserve the cultural heritage.

Some challenges faced by Indonesia's tourism industry include the development of infrastructure to support tourism across the large archipelago, incursions of this industry into local traditions (adat), and the impact of tourism development on local life. The tourism industry has also faced setbacks because of security problems. Since 2002, warnings have been issued by some countries about terrorist threats, as well as ethnic and religious conflicts in some areas, significantly reducing the number of foreign visitors for a few years. However, the number of international tourists has recovered since 2007; this number reached a new high in 2008, and it has continued to rise since then.

The 2019 Travel and Tourism Competitiveness Report ranks Indonesia 40th out of 140 countries overall, with a score of 4.3. This report lists the price competitiveness of Indonesia's tourism sector as 6th out of 140 countries. The report states that Indonesia scores well on visa policy (3rd) and international openness (16th), as well as on natural (17th) and cultural resources (24th). However, Indonesia scores poorly on infrastructure (98th), because some aspects of tourist service infrastructure are underdeveloped. Other aspects that must be improved include health and hygiene, environmental sustainability, and affinity for travel and tourism.

=== Historical context ===
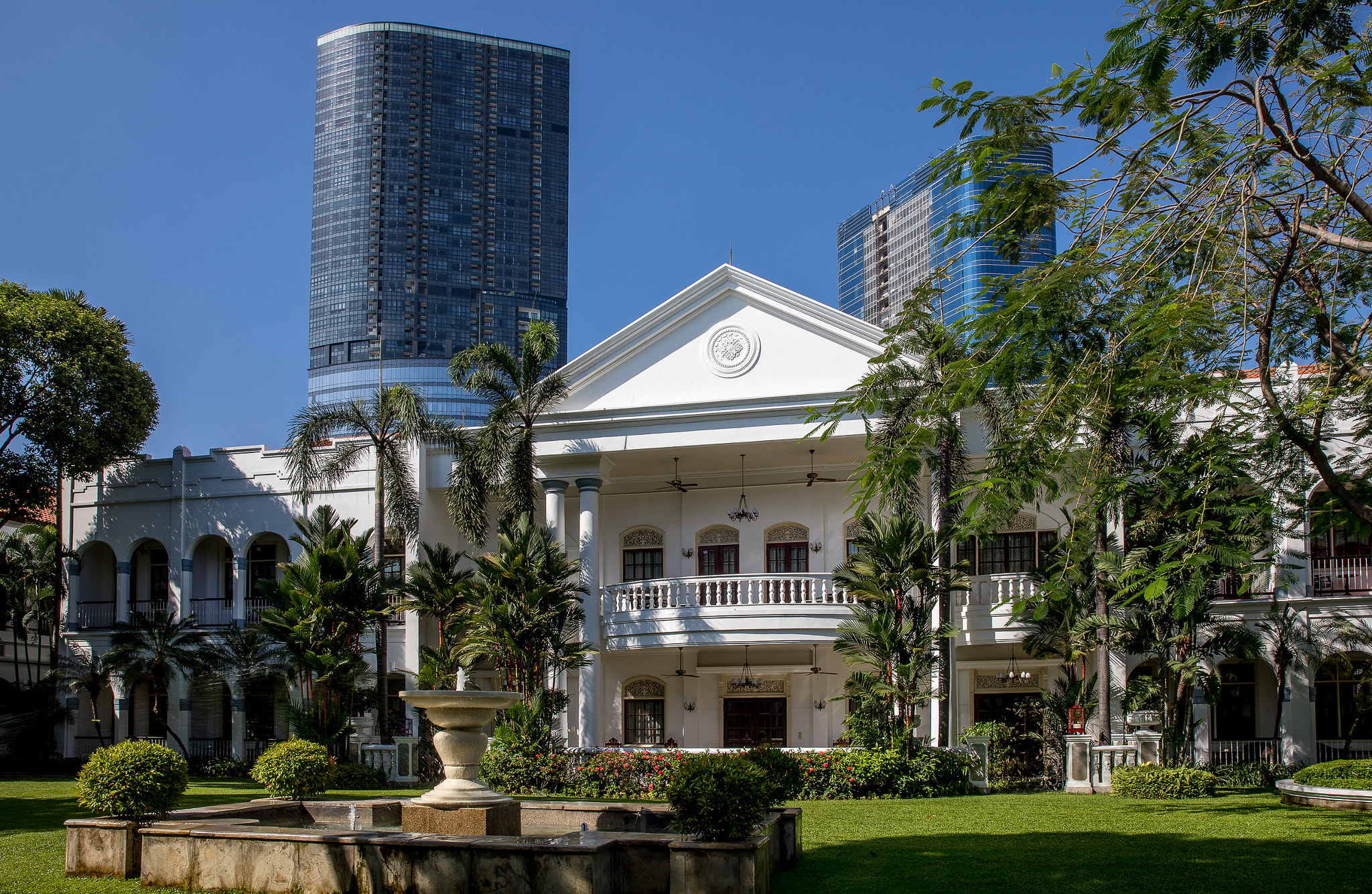
Hotel Majapahit (est. 1910) in Surabaya experienced the tearing of the Dutch flag by the youth of Surabaya in 1946.

Indonesia seems to have been a travel destination for centuries. Some panels in Borobudur bas-reliefs depicted drink vendors, warungs (small restaurants), and taverns or lodgings where people drank and danced. The historical record of travel in Indonesia can be found since the 14th century. The Nagarakretagama (old Javanese eulogy) reported that King Hayam Wuruk's royal travel throughout the Majapahit realm in East Java included many carriages, accompanied by nobles, royal courtiers, officials and servants. Although it seemed like an affair of state, in some instances the king's trip resembled a modern-day tour, as the king visited multiple modern tourism sites – from temples such as Palah and Jajawa, to mountain scenery, bathing in petirtaan (bathing pools) and going to the beach. The 15th-century travelogue of Bujangga Manik, a traveling Hindu scholar-priest from the city of Pakuan Pajajaran, reported on his travels around Java and Bali. Although his journey was a pilgrimage, visiting temples and sacred places in Java and Bali, sometimes he behaved like a contemporary tourist – for example, sitting and fanning himself while looking at mountain scenery in the Puncak area, Gede volcano that he describes as the highest point around Pakuan Pajajaran (capital of the Sunda kingdom).

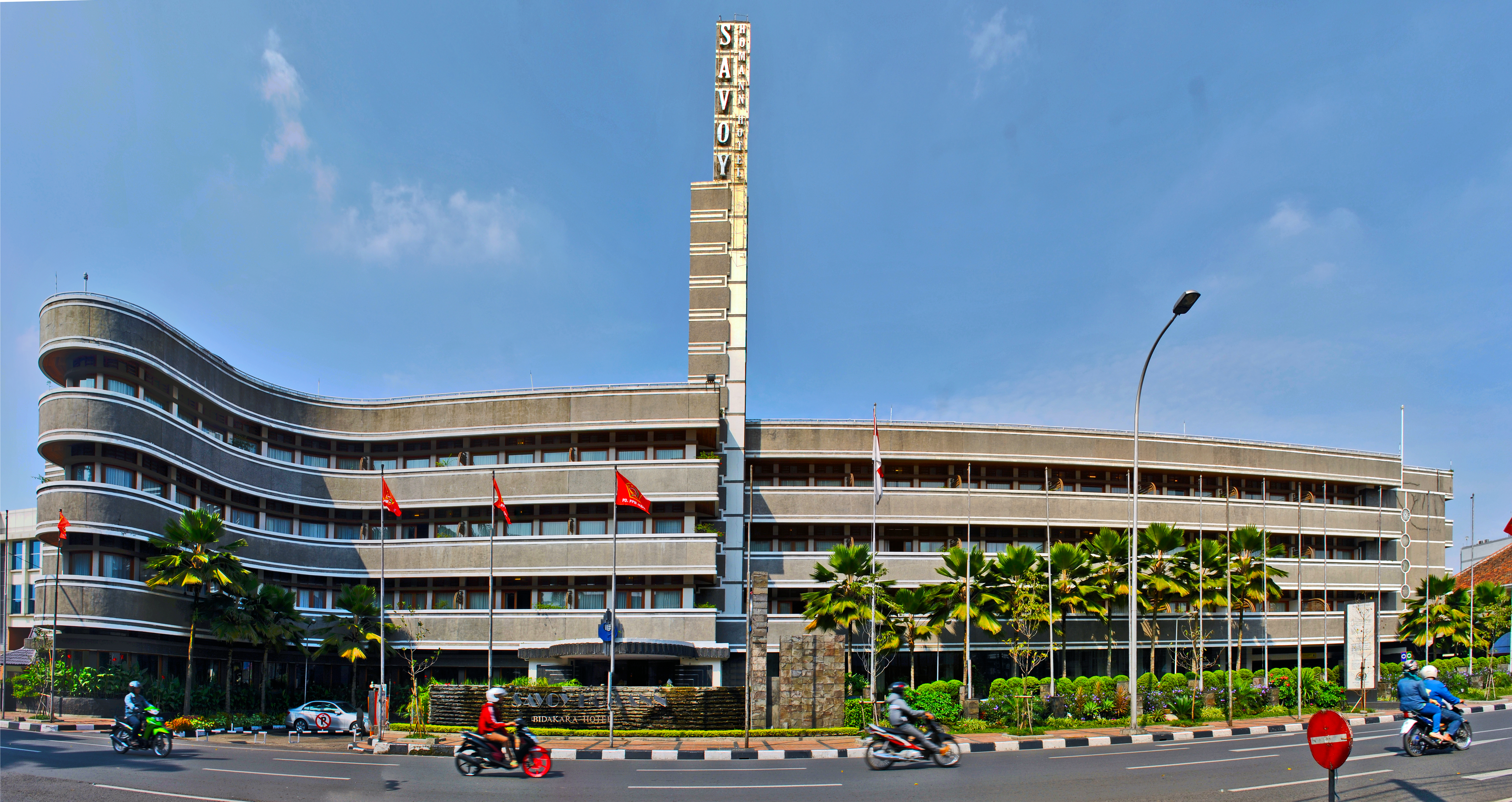
Hotel Savoy Homann (completed in 1939) in Bandung, an example of Art Deco architecture in Indonesia

Initially, the tourism, service and hospitality sectors in the Dutch East Indies were developed to cater to the lodging, entertainment and leisure needs of domestic visitors, especially the wealthy Dutch plantation owners and merchants during their visits to the city. In the 19th century, colonial heritage hotels equipped with dance halls, live music and fine-dining restaurants were established in urban areas of the Dutch East Indies; these hotels included Hotel des Indes (est. 1829) in Batavia (now Jakarta), Savoy Homann Hotel (est. 1871) in Bandung, Hotel Oranje (est. 1910) in Surabaya, and Hotel De Boer in Medan. Since the 19th century, the Dutch East Indies have attracted visitors from the Netherlands. The first national tourism bureau was the Vereeniging Toeristen Verkeer, established by the Governor-General of the Dutch East Indies in the early 20th century; this bureau shared its head office in Batavia with the airline Koninklijke Nederlandsch Indische Luchtfahrt Maatschappij, or KNILM (not a KLM subsidiary), which began flying from Amsterdam to Batavia in 1929. In 1913, the Vereeniging Touristen Verkeer wrote a guidebook on tourist locations in the Indies. Since then, Bali has become known to international tourists, with foreign tourist arrivals rising by more than 100% in 1927. Much of the international tourism of the 1920s and 1930s was by international visitors on ocean cruises. The 1930s saw a modest but significant influx of mainly European tourists and long-term visitors to Bali. Many came for the blossoming arts scene in the Ubud area, which was both an internal phenomenon and a two-way exchange between the Balinese and outsiders.

Hotel Indonesia (est. 1962), one of the earliest high-rise buildings in Jakarta

Tourism mostly disappeared during World War II, the Indonesian National Revolution and the early years of President Sukarno's era. On 1 July 1947, the government of the Republic of Indonesia tried to revive the country's tourism sector by establishing HONET (Hotel National & Tourism) led by R. Tjitpo Ruslan. This new national tourism authority took over many of the colonial heritage hotels in Java and renamed them all "Hotel Merdeka". After the Dutch–Indonesian Round Table Conference in 1949, this tourism authority changed its name to NV HORNET. In 1952, the president formed the Inter-Departmental Committee on Tourism Affairs, which was responsible for reestablishing Indonesia as a global tourism destination.

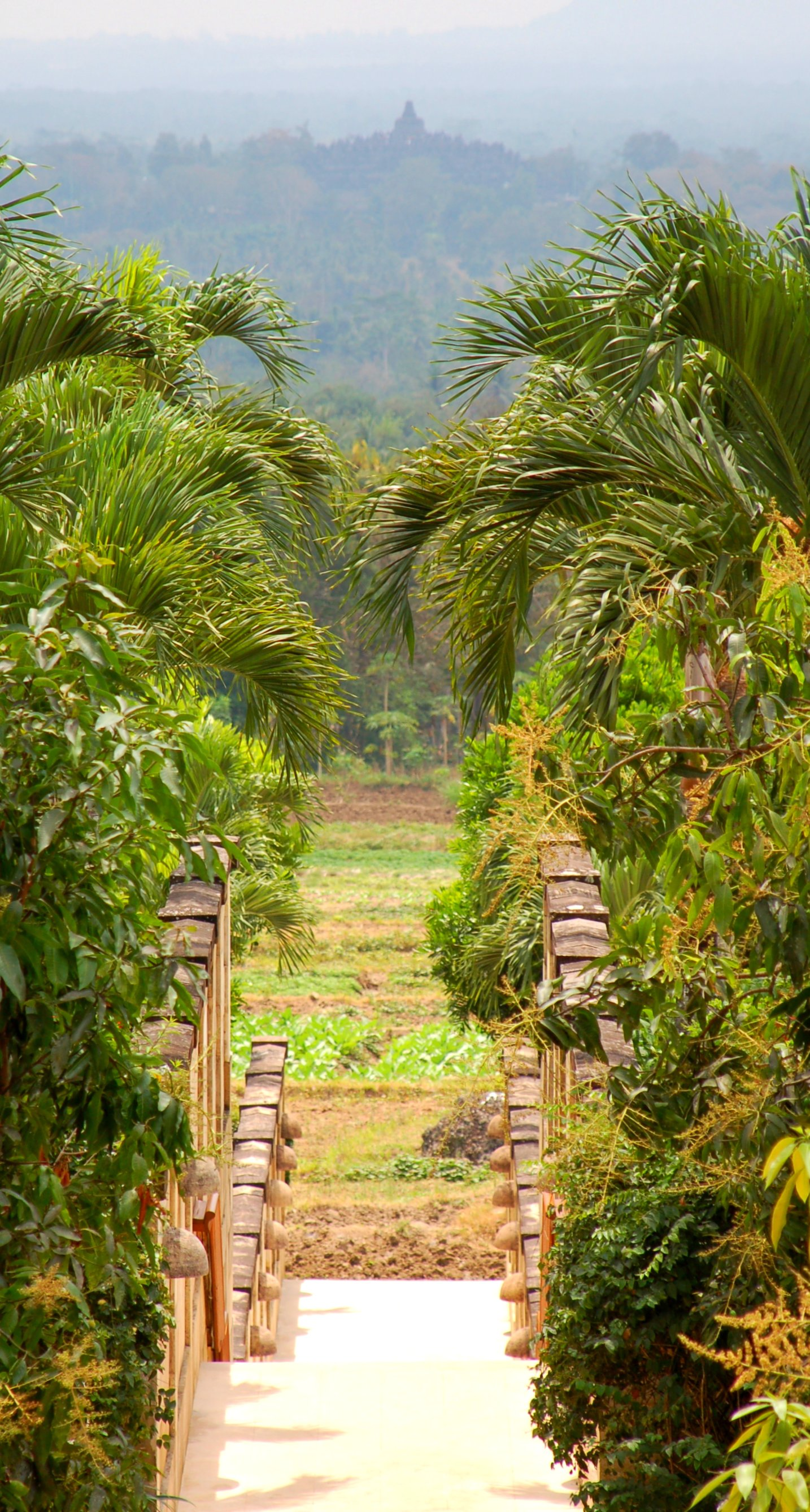
Borobudur viewed from Amanjiwo hotel

National pride and identity in the late 1950s and early 1960s were incorporated into the architectural monumentalism of Sukarno in Jakarta; this included the development of multi-story international standard hotels and beach resorts, such as Hotel Indonesia in Jakarta (est. 1962), Ambarrukmo Hotel in Yogyakarta (est. 1965), Samudra Beach Hotel in Pelabuhan Ratu beach, West Java (est. 1966), and Inna Grand Bali Beach Hotel in Bali (est. 1966). The political and economic instability of the mid-1960s saw a radical decline in tourism again. However, during this time, Bali – particularly the village of Kuta – was an important stopover on the overland hippy trail between Australia and Europe, as well as a supposedly secret, undeveloped surf spot. To stimulate the tourism sector, Indonesia joined PATA in the early 1960s; the country was appointed host of the PATA annual conference in 1963 and 1974 in Jakarta, and in 2003 in Bali. To host the 1974 PATA conference, the Hotel Borobudur was built and named the official event hotel. At that time, the hotel was the largest and the most luxurious in Jakarta.

In the early-to-mid-1970s, high-standard hotels and tourist facilities began to appear in Jakarta and Bali. After the completion of the Borobudur restoration project in 1982, Yogyakarta became a popular tourist destination in Indonesia following Bali; tourists were mostly attracted to the 8th-century Buddhist monument, the surrounding ancient Javanese temples and the Yogyakarta Sultanate palace. From this period to the end of President Suharto's era, governmental policy on the tourism industry included many regulations and developments to encourage more international tourists both to visit Indonesia and to stay longer.

== Statistics ==
=== Tourist arrivals ===
Annual tourist arrivals (millions)

Source: Statistics Indonesia

Annual tourist arrivals by country of origin
Country of origin	9/2026	2025	2024	2023	2022	2021	2020	2019	2018	2017
Malaysia	2,125,935	2,639,749	2,278,281	1,901,242	1,212,574	480,723	980,118	2,980,753	2,503,344	1,238,276
Australia	1,402,295	1,754,791	1,671,222	1,431,177	655,370	3,196	256,291	1,386,803	1,301,478	1,188,449
China	1,207,581	1,344,074	1,198,582	787,924	169,378	54,713	239,768	2,072,079	2,139,161	1,972,405
Singapore	1,123,038	1,526,438	1,408,015	1,414,447	736,797	18,704	280,492	1,934,445	1,768,744	1,512,813
Timor-Leste	701,539	1,009,181	776,294	728,586	703,780	819,488	994,590	1,178,381	1,762,442	960,026
India	536,464	734,490	710,688	606,439	281,814	6,670	111,724	657,300	595,636	485,314
South Korea	353,982	496,862	436,054	347,185	122,226	9,497	75,562	388,316	358,885	378,769
United States	318,713	412,115	418,196	392,310	188,764	21,962	91,782	457,832	387,856	331,132
United Kingdom	311,260	412,902	392,133	335,209	170,881	5,177	69,997	397,624	392,112	361,197
France	286,475	367,904	346,337	273,682	134,541	3,776	43,438	283,814	287,917	268,989
Japan	274,358	380,079	338,934	251,866	73,913	5,952	92,228	519,623	530,573	538,334
Germany	210,385	287,596	281,397	263,534	128,634	3,429	46,361	277,653	274,166	260,586
Philippines	184,957	246,728	239,714	209,458	78,436	9,375	50,413	260,980	217,874	162,726
Netherlands	184,638	251,941	314,211	250,201	115,052	12,229	53,495	215,287	209,978	205,844
Russia	178,231	219,162	180,215	161,323	75,578	8,392	67,491	158,943	125,728	110,529
Taiwan	170,598	204,704	183,341	155,150	25,750	1,398	35,680	207,490	208,317	211,489
New Zealand	138,312	181,081	159,229	116,603	44,125	482	19,947	149,010	128,366	106,914
Papua New Guinea	131,453	156,138	124,492	76,471	22,509	31,703	20,975	78,433	142,648	141,299
Hong Kong	115,847	131,140	56,302	13,885	7,086	2,432	2,625	50,324	91,182	98,272
Saudi Arabia	114,128	156,318	135,643	107,684	47,472	2,053	31,906	157,512	165,912	166,111
Italy	109,226	146,360	131,149	104,393	47,415	2,339	13,260	91,229	94,288	90,022
Spain	102,242	140,245	142,247	106,581	51,563	3,255	11,829	83,373	85,560	81,690
Canada	76,497	97,558	87,889	83,696	36,042	1,242	23,200	103,616	97,908	96,139
Thailand	73,854	112,137	119,664	111,786	61,128	3,992	21,303	136,699	124,153	106,510
Vietnam	64,153	87,398	106,630	121,879	68,067	2,008	19,608	96,024	75,816	77,466
Turkey	60,222	66,902	50,051	30,433	14,424	1,122	6,038	23,883	20,861	34,433
Poland	46,985	68,100	53,907	41,988	18,401	752	9,055	41,637	31,437	32,704
Switzerland	44,076	60,616	58,205	48,459	23,192	782	8,362	57,484	60,293	61,191
Belgium	43,691	55,493	52,826	42,888	21,120	798	5,902	46,780	50,050	48,477
Myanmar	39,042	57,147	49,255	40,920	22,637	3,093	12,669	46,381	28,612	48,133
Denmark	33,395	44,309	42,141	39,555	20,913	557	10,533	45,090	46,825	43,721
Pakistan	32,933	36,348	23,150	14,264	5,247	974	4,110	14,663	13,448	11,424
Portugal	28,882	41,193	37,350	32,029	14,393	476	6,245	35,434	36,804	33,223
Ireland	27,679	39,607	38,676	34,466	16,003	291	5,167	28,602	28,742	29,400
Sweden	26,602	38,719	40,297	37,481	19,885	3,516	17,600	56,402	50,381	51,417
Brazil	25,777	34,497	32,031	29,497	14,855	952	5,945	30,232	26,503	32,403
Kazakhstan	25,772	24,424	19,403	8,198	2,282	378	3,735	9,781	7,955	7,219
Austria	25,546	34,095	39,041	34,984	17,708	2,103	4,858	28,476	29,492	27,208
South Africa	25,377	36,548	33,135	31,872	13,267	572	15,142	47,657	41,962	38,073
Ukraine	22,825	30,688	27,672	22,204	11,428	3,044	16,491	35,537	26,697	32,964
Brunei	22,649	31,797	19,796	13,518	4,798	144	2,701	19,278	17,279	23,455
Czech Republic	19,981	27,209	22,741	18,388	7,607	496	6,178	23,941	22,848	20,125
Norway	18,469	23,721	22,170	19,577	10,069	336	5,072	23,886	24,906	22,838
Romania	18,070	27,191	27,030	25,031	9,896	510	4,320	18,650	14,092	18,787
Hungary	14,778	21,042	19,234	16,689	6,384	218	3,664	14,218	13,434	12,600
Uzbekistan	11,648	10,480	8,130	5,283	1,393	68	1,586	3,756	3,548	4,057
Mongolia	10,082	9,708	4,850	2,323	706	12	1,483	4,260	3,679	2,414
Total	12,005,400	15,386,646	13,902,420	11,677,825	5,889,031	1,557,530	4,052,923	16,106,954	15,810,305	14,039,799

Between January and November 2024, Indonesia recorded 12.66 million foreign visitor arrivals, the most in five years and about 20.7% more than the same period in 2023, according to Statistics Indonesia (BPS).

=== Past arrival statistics ===
Indonesian tourism statistics
2000	5,064,217
2001	5,153,620
2002	5,033 400
2003	4,467,021
2004	5,321,165
2005	5,002,101
2006	4,871,351
2007	5,505,759
2008	6,429,027
2009	6,452,259
2010	7,002,944
2011	7,649,731
2012	8,044,462
2013	8,802,129
2014	9,435,411
2015	10,406,759
2016	11,519,275
2017	14,039,799
2018	15,810,305
2019	16,106,954
2020	4,052,923
2021	1,557,530
2022	5,889,031
2023	11,677,825
2024	13,902,420
2025	15,386,646

The ten most popular tourist destinations in Indonesia, as recorded by the Central Statistics Agency (BPS), are Bali, West Java, Central Java, East Java, Jakarta, North Sumatra, Lampung, South Sulawesi, South Sumatra, Banten and West Sumatra. (This list includes 11 provinces because Banten was previously part of West Java.)

As in most countries, domestic tourists are the largest market segment by far. The most substantial movements by domestic tourists occur during the Islamic holiday Eid al-Fitr, locally known as lebaran. During this period, which is a two-week holiday after a month of fasting during Ramadan, many urban Muslim Indonesians visit relatives in their hometowns. Intercity traffic peaks, and an additional surcharge is often applied during this time.

During the five years leading up to 2006, attention was focused on generating more domestic tourism. Competition among budget airlines has increased the number of domestic air travelers throughout the country. Recently, the Ministry of Labour legislated to create long weekends by combining public holidays that occur near weekends, except for important religious holidays. During these long weekends, most hotels in popular destinations are fully booked.

Since 2000, on average, five million foreign tourists have visited each year (see table), who spend an average of $100 per day. With an average visit duration of 9–12 days, Indonesia gains $4.6 billion of foreign exchange income annually. This income makes tourism Indonesia's third most important source of foreign revenue other than oil and gas, after timber and textile products.

After surpassing Japan two years ago, China – as the world's biggest tourism spender – outranked Australia to become the third largest source of visitors to Indonesia, with a 30.42% year-on-year (y-o-y) increase; foreign tourist arrivals, growing 10.6% y-o-y, were projected to exceed 2.9 million. The data on top countries of origin during the first quarter of 2014 comes from the Asia-Pacific region, with Singapore (15.7 per cent), Malaysia (14.0), China (11.0), Australia and Japan among the top countries.

Around 59% of all visitors travel to Indonesia on holiday, while 38% travel for business.

In 2012, according to the World Travel & Tourism Council, travel and tourism contributed 8.9% of Indonesia's Gross Domestic Product (GDP) and supported 8% of total employment in the country.

== Nature tourism ==
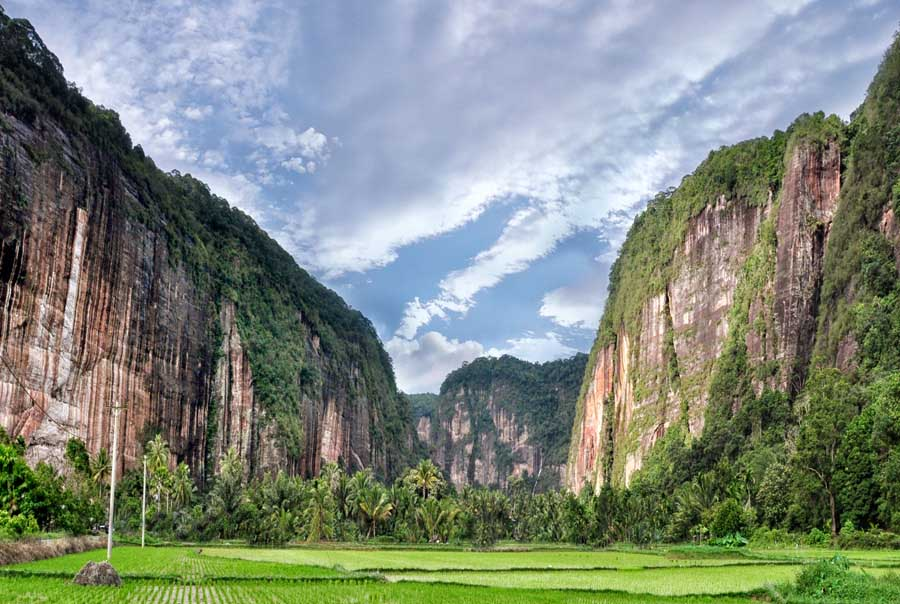
Harau Canyon in Lima Puluh Kota Regency is close to Payakumbuh, West Sumatra

Indonesia has a well-preserved, natural ecosystem with rainforests that stretch over about 57% of Indonesia's land (910,000 square kilometres or 225 million acres), approximately 2% of which are mangrove systems. The natural ecosystem in Indonesia is still well-preserved partly because only 6,000 islands out of 17,000 are permanently inhabited. Forests on Sumatra and Java are examples of popular tourist destinations. Moreover, Indonesia has one of the world's longest coastlines, measuring 54,716 kilometres (33,999 mi), with a number of beaches and island resorts – such as those in southern Bali, Lombok, Bintan and Nias Island. However, most of the well-preserved beaches are in more isolated and less developed areas, such as Karimunjawa, the Togian Islands and the Banda Islands.

=== Dive sites ===
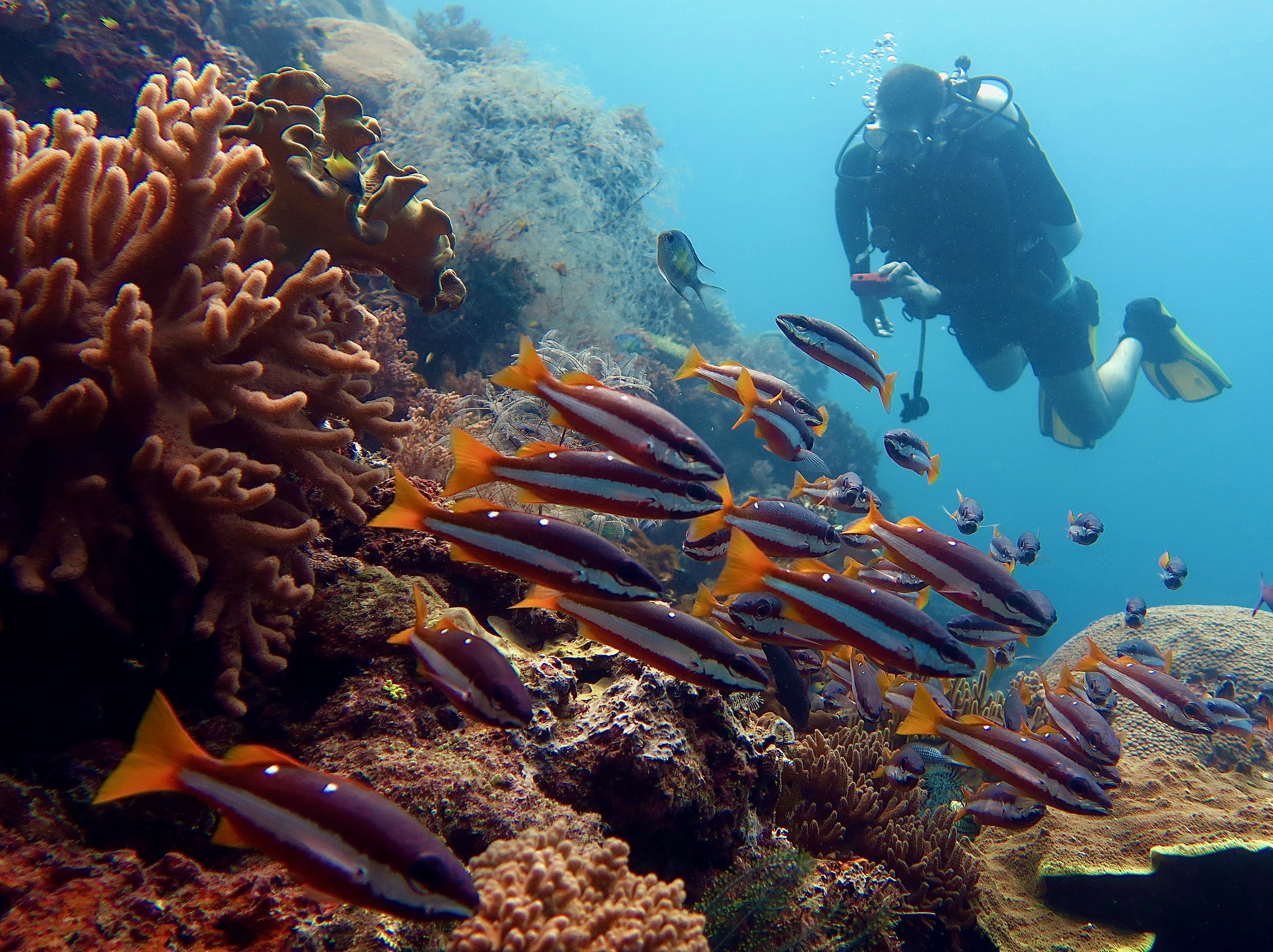
A diver in Raja Ampat

With more than 17,508 islands, Indonesia offers ample opportunities for diving. Indonesia has 20% of the world's coral reefs, over 3,000 fish species and 600 coral species, deep water trenches, volcanic sea mounts, World War II wrecks, and a large variety of macro life; so scuba diving in Indonesia is both varied and relatively inexpensive. Bunaken National Marine Park, at the northern tip of Sulawesi, reportedly has seven times more genera of coral than Hawaii, and the park has more than 70% of all known fish species in the Western Indo-Pacific. Moreover, there are more than 3,500 species living in Indonesian waters, including sharks, dolphins, manta rays, turtles, morays, cuttlefish, octopus and scorpionfish, compared to 1,500 species on the Great Barrier Reef and 600 in the Red Sea. Tulamben Bay in Bali has the wreck of the 120 metres (390 ft) US Army commissioned transport vessel, the Liberty. Other popular dive sites on Bali are at Candidasa and Menjangan. Across the Badung Strait from Bali, there are several popular dive sites on the islands of Nusa Lembongan and Nusa Penida. Lombok's three Gili Islands (Gili Air, Gili Meno and Gili Trawangan) are popular, as is Bangka. Saronde Island is a popular spot also in Gorontalo, Sulawesi. Some of the best-known diving sites in Indonesia are the most difficult to reach; places such as Biak (off the coast of Papua) and the Alor Archipelago are among the popular, more remote, destinations for divers.

=== Surf breaks ===
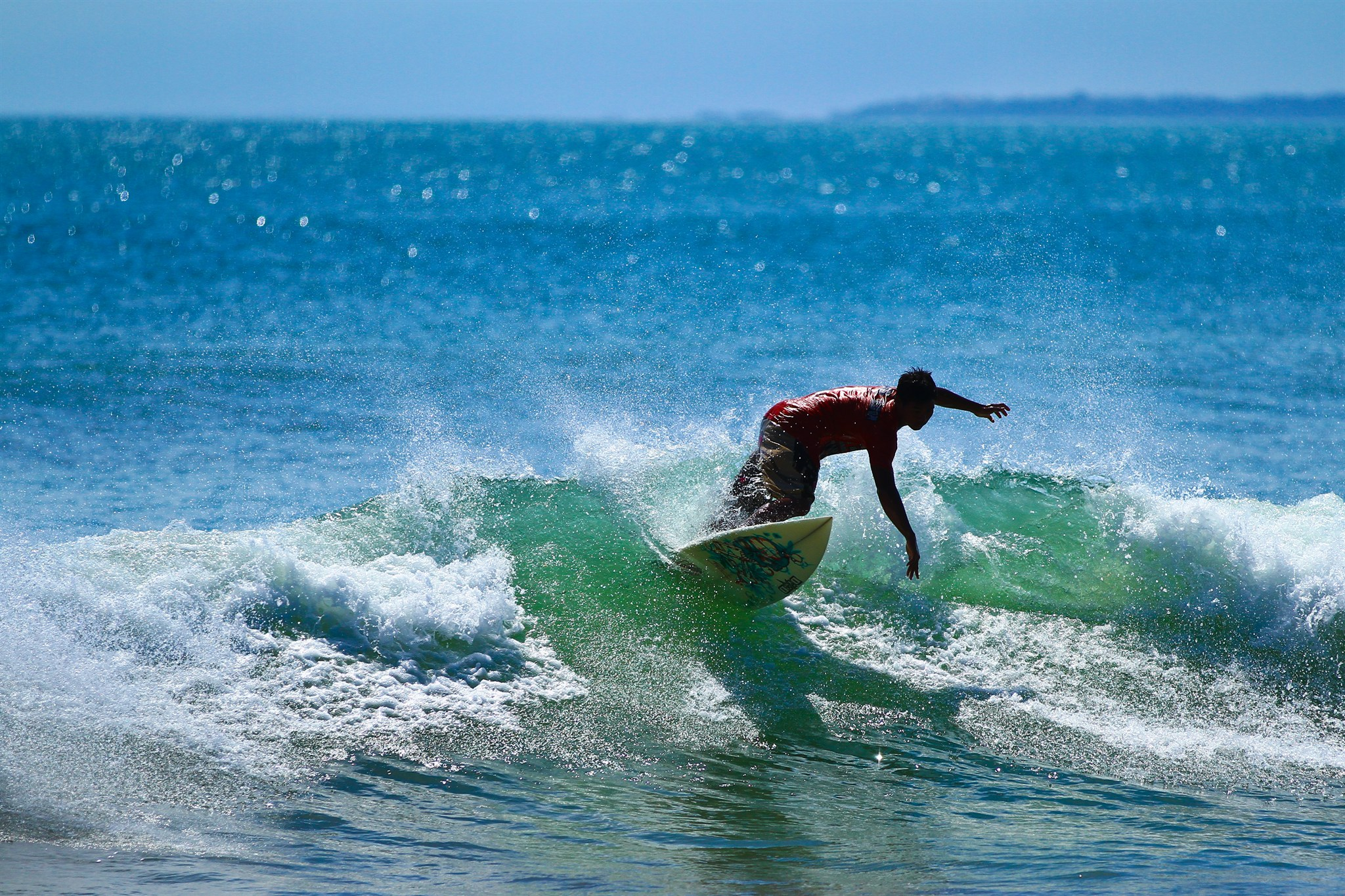
Surfing at Kuta beach, Bali

In addition, surfing is a popular water activity in Indonesia, and the country's sites are recognised internationally. The best-known locations are mainly on the southern, Indian Ocean side of Indonesia, with the largest breaks on southern Java. The north coast does not receive the same surf from the Java Sea. Surf breaks can be found all along Sumatra, down to Nusa Tenggara, including Aceh, Bali, Banten, Java, Lombok, the Mentawai Islands and Sumbawa. Although Indonesia has many internationally known surfing locations, the majority of surfers come from abroad, especially Australia and the United States. Local interest in surfing began at Bali and West Java's Pelabuhan Ratu and Pangandaran beaches, with most surfers arriving from the nearby cities of Jakarta and Bandung.

In 2018, the World Surf League held eight surfing events in Indonesia.

Bali has about 33 surf locations, from West Bali to East Bali, including four on the offshore island of Nusa Lembongan. On Sumbawa, Hu'u and Lakey Beach in Cempi Bay are popular spots among surfers. Among the islands, Sumatra has the most surf spots, with 18 in total. High season for surfing is around May to September, with the trade winds blowing from east to southeast. From October to April, winds tend to come from the west to northwest, so the east-coast breaks receive the offshore winds.

Two well-known surf breaks in Indonesia are the G-Land in the Bay of Grajagan, East Java, and Lagundri Bay at the southern end of Nias island. G-Land was first identified in 1972 when a surfer saw the break from an airplane window. Since 6- to 8-foot waves (on the Hawaiian scale) were discovered by surfers at Lagundri Bay in 1975, the island has become internationally known for surfing.

=== National parks ===
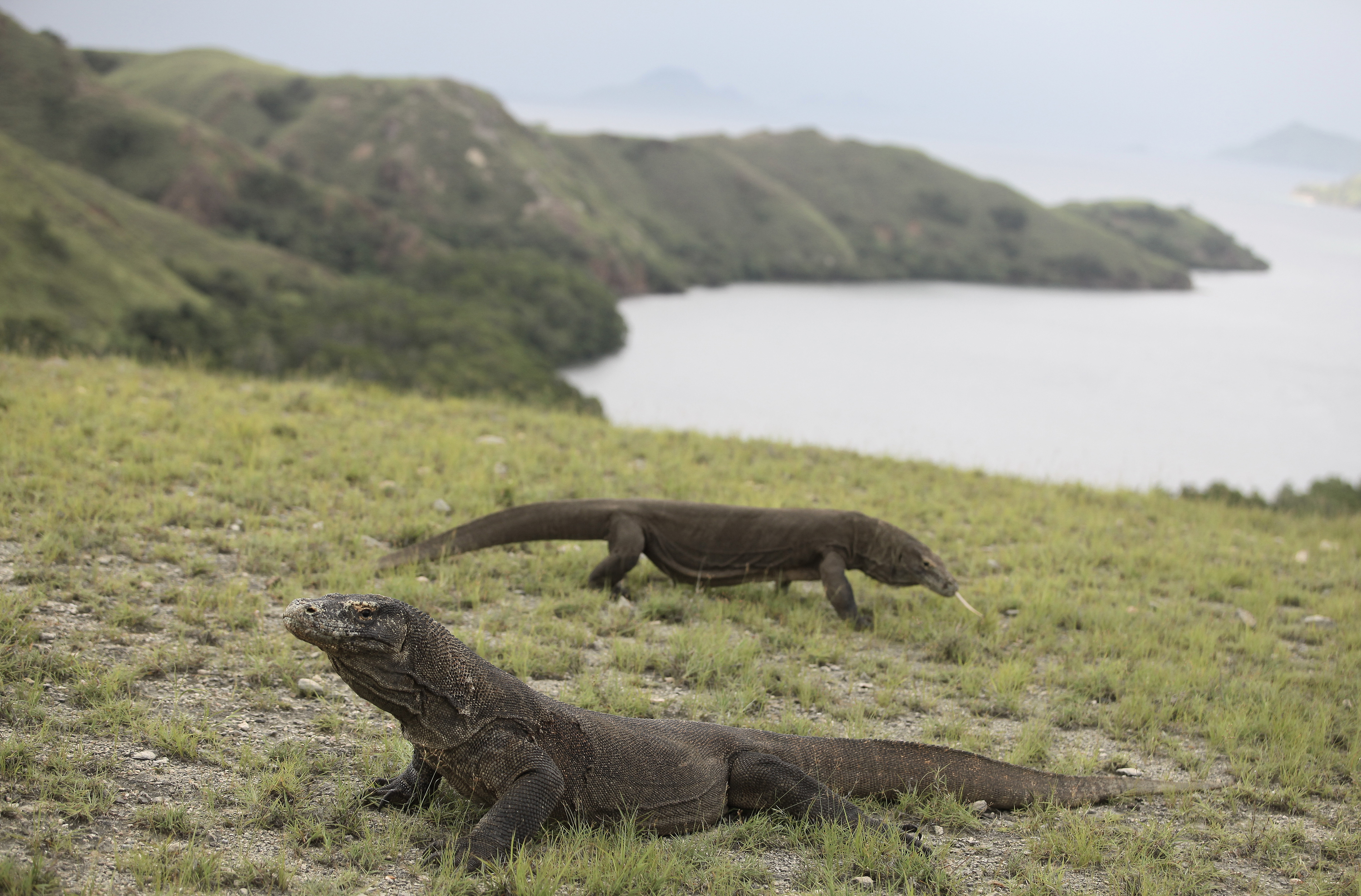
Komodo dragon at Komodo National Park

Bogor Botanical Gardens, established in 1817, and Cibodas Botanical Gardens, established in 1862, are among the oldest botanical gardens in Asia. With collections of tropical plants, these gardens have been centres for botanical research as well as tourist attractions since the colonial era.

Indonesia has 50 national parks, of which six are listed as United Nations Educational, Scientific and Cultural Organization (UNESCO) World Heritage sites. The largest national parks in Sumatra are the 9,500-square-kilometre (3,700 sq mi) Gunung Leuser National Park, the 13,750-square-kilometre (5,310 sq mi) Kerinci Seblat National Park and the 3,568-square-kilometre (1,378 sq mi) Bukit Barisan Selatan National Park. All of these parts are recognised as Tropical Rainforest Heritage of Sumatra on the World Heritage list. Other national parks on this list are Lorentz National Park in Papua, Komodo National Park in the Lesser Sunda Islands, and Ujung Kulon National Park in the west of Java.

Notably, different national parks feature different biodiversity because Indonesia's natural habitat is divided into two areas by the Wallace line. The Wallacea biogeographical distinction implies that the western part of Indonesia (Sumatra, Java and Kalimantan) has the same flora and fauna characteristics as Asia, while the eastern part of Indonesia has similarities with Australia.

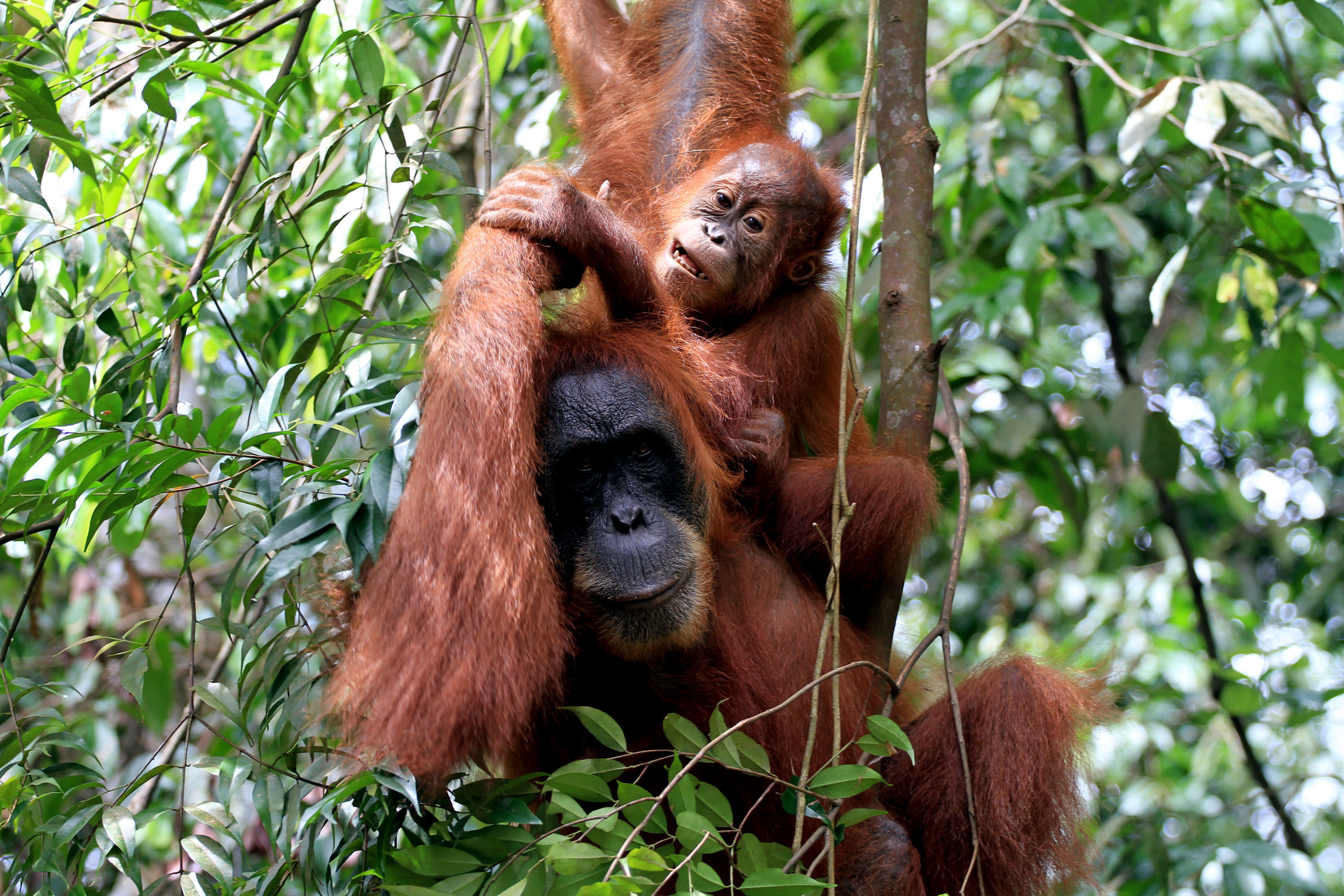
Sumatran orangutan mother and child in Mount Leuser National Park, North Sumatra

Many native species – such as Sumatran elephants, Sumatran tigers, Sumatran rhinoceroses, Javan rhinoceroses and orangutans – are listed as endangered or critically endangered; the remaining populations are found in national parks and other conservation areas. Sumatran orangutans can be visited in the Bukit Lawang conservation area, while Bornean orangutans can be visited in Tanjung Puting National Park, Central Kalimantan. The world's largest flower, Rafflesia arnoldii, and the tallest flower, titan arum, can be found in Sumatra.

The east side of the Wallace line offers unusual, rare, and exotic animals. Birds-of-paradise, locally known as cenderawasih, are plumed birds that can be found among other fauna in Papua New Guinea. The largest bird in Papua is the flightless cassowary. One species of lizard, the Komodo dragon, can be found on Komodo, located in the region of the Nusa Tenggara Lesser Sunda Islands. In addition to Komodo island, this endangered species can also be found on the islands of Rinca, Padar and Flores.

=== Volcanoes ===
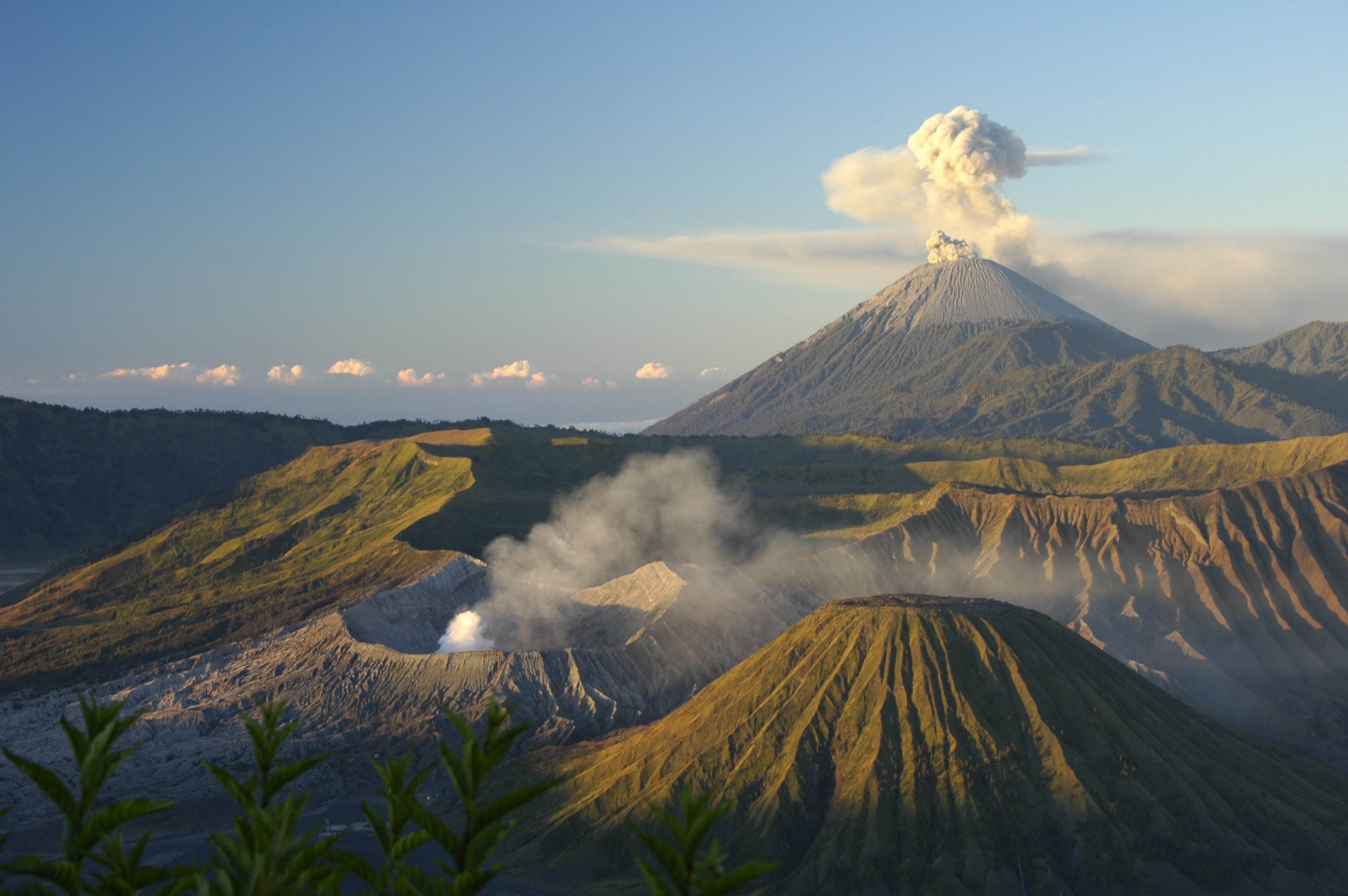
Mount Bromo and Semeru in East Java

Hiking and camping in the mountains are popular adventure activities. Some mountains feature ridge rivers, supporting rafting activities. Though volcanic mountains can be dangerous, they have become major tourist destinations. Several tourists have died on the slopes of Mount Rinjani, Indonesia's second-highest volcano and a popular destination for climbers visiting Lombok in eastern Indonesia. Popular active volcanoes are the following:

- the 2,329-metre (7,641 ft) high Mount Bromo in the East Java province, with its scenic volcanic desert around the crater
- the upturned boat-shaped Tangkuban Perahu and the volcanic crater Kawah Putih, north and south of Bandung respectively, both offering drive-in access to the crater
- the most active volcano in Java, Mount Merapi, near Yogyakarta
- the legendary Krakatau, with its new caldera known as Anak Krakatau (the child of Krakatau)

Gede Pangrango volcano in West Java is another popular hiking destination, especially among domestic hikers.

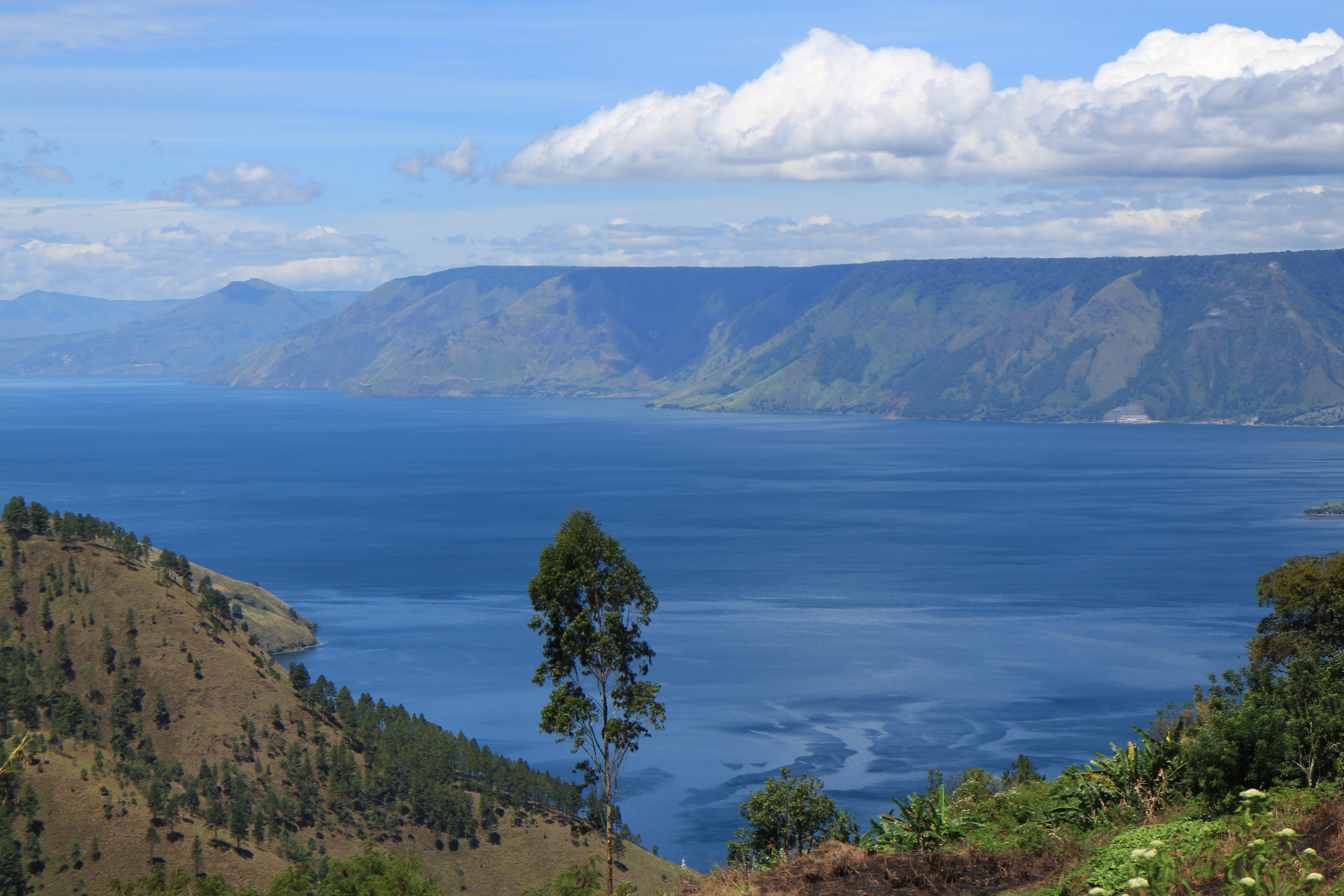
Lake Toba, the world's largest volcanic lake, panoramic view seen from Merek, North Sumatra

In Sumbawa, Mount Tambora – with a historic major volcanic eruption in 1815 that produced a huge caldera – also gained attention among hikers. On the neighbouring island of Flores, the three-coloured volcanic crater-lake of Kelimutu is also praised as one of Indonesia's natural wonders and has attracted visitors worldwide. Puncak Jaya in the Lorentz National Park, the highest mountain in Indonesia and a rare mountain with ice caps at the (tropical) equator, offers opportunities for rock climbing. In Sumatra, the remains of a supervolcano eruption have created the landscape of Lake Toba near Medan in North Sumatra.

== Cultural tourism ==
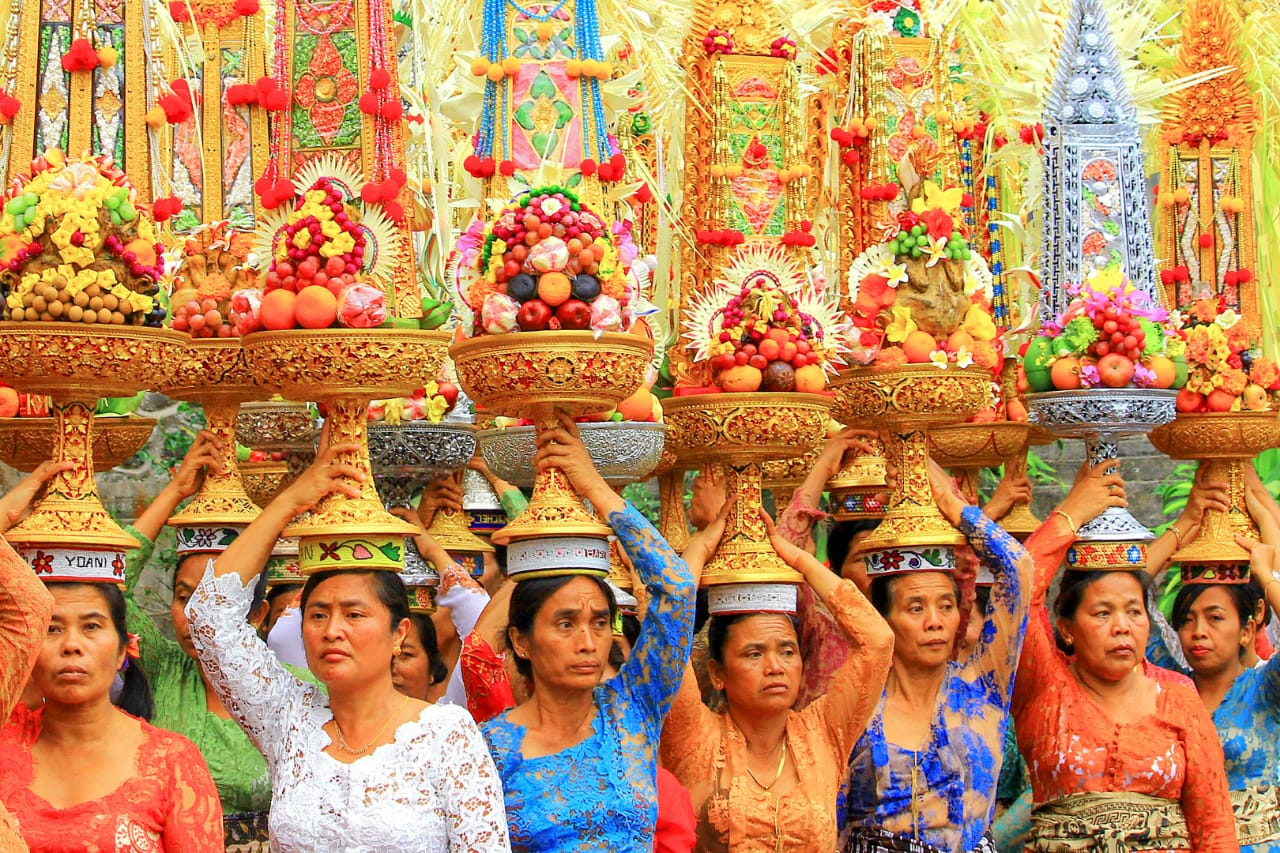
Bali is known for its rich and colourful culture, Hindu festivals and dances.

The population of Indonesia consists of over 600 ethnic groups, spread over the 1.8 million km^{2} area of 6,000 inhabited islands. This population creates cultural diversity, further amplified by Hindu, Buddhist, Islamic and European colonial influences. In Bali, where most Indonesian Hindus live, cultural and religious festivals with Balinese dance-drama performances in Balinese temples are attractions for foreign tourists.

Despite foreign influences, an array of indigenous traditional cultures is still evident in Indonesia. The indigenous ethnic group of Toraja in South Sulawesi retains a strong tradition that derives from animistic beliefs, even though most Toraja are Christian. A well-known Toraja tradition is the funeral rites, Rambu Solo. The Minangkabau ethnic group retains a unique matrilineal culture, despite being devoted Muslims. Other indigenous ethnic groups include the Asmat and the Dani in Papua; the Dayak in Kalimantan; and the Mentawai in Sumatra, where traditional rituals are still performed.

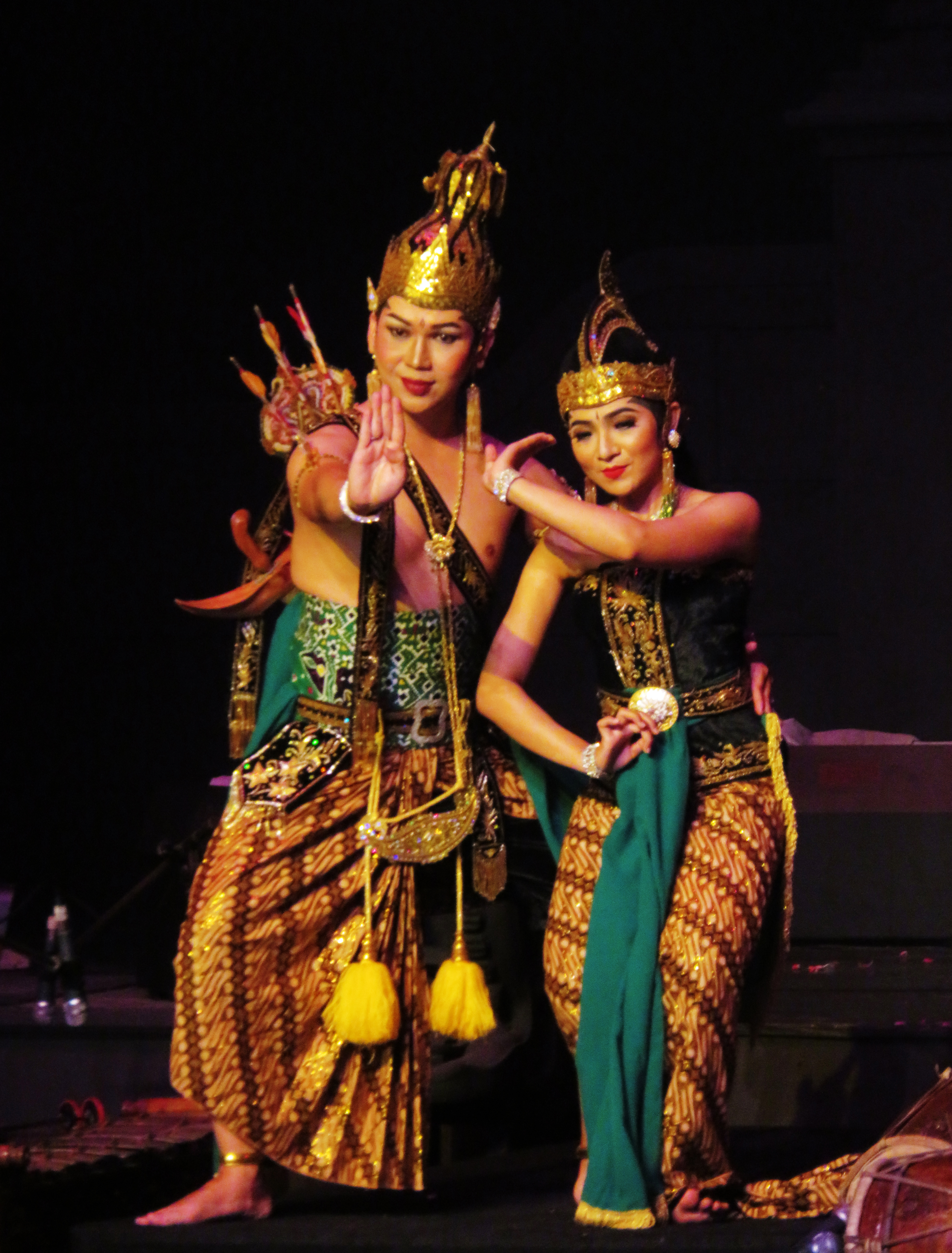
Ramayana Wayang wong Javanese dance performance at Prambanan temple.

Cultural tourism also plays a significant part in Yogyakarta, a special province in Indonesia known as the centre of classical Javanese fine art and culture. The rise and fall of Buddhist, Hindu, and Islamic kingdoms in Central Java has changed Yogyakarta into a melting pot of Indonesian culture. Classical Javanese dances are performed in the royal courts of Yogyakarta and Surakarta, and Javanese Ramayana Ballet is performed in the Prambanan open-air theatre.

Most major Indonesian cities have state-owned museums, although most are modest in appearance. As a prominent example, the National Museum of Indonesia in Jakarta displays Indonesian culture and history from the prehistoric to the colonial era.

For Indonesian and foreign visitors unable to visit all Indonesian provinces, the cultural theme park Taman Mini Indonesia Indah in East Jakarta provides a comprehensive microcosm of Indonesian culture. This park was established in 1975 by Tien Suharto, wife of Indonesian president Suharto. The park features museums, pavilions with collections of Indonesian architecture, clothing, dances and traditions.

=== Ancient Hindu and Buddhist temples ===
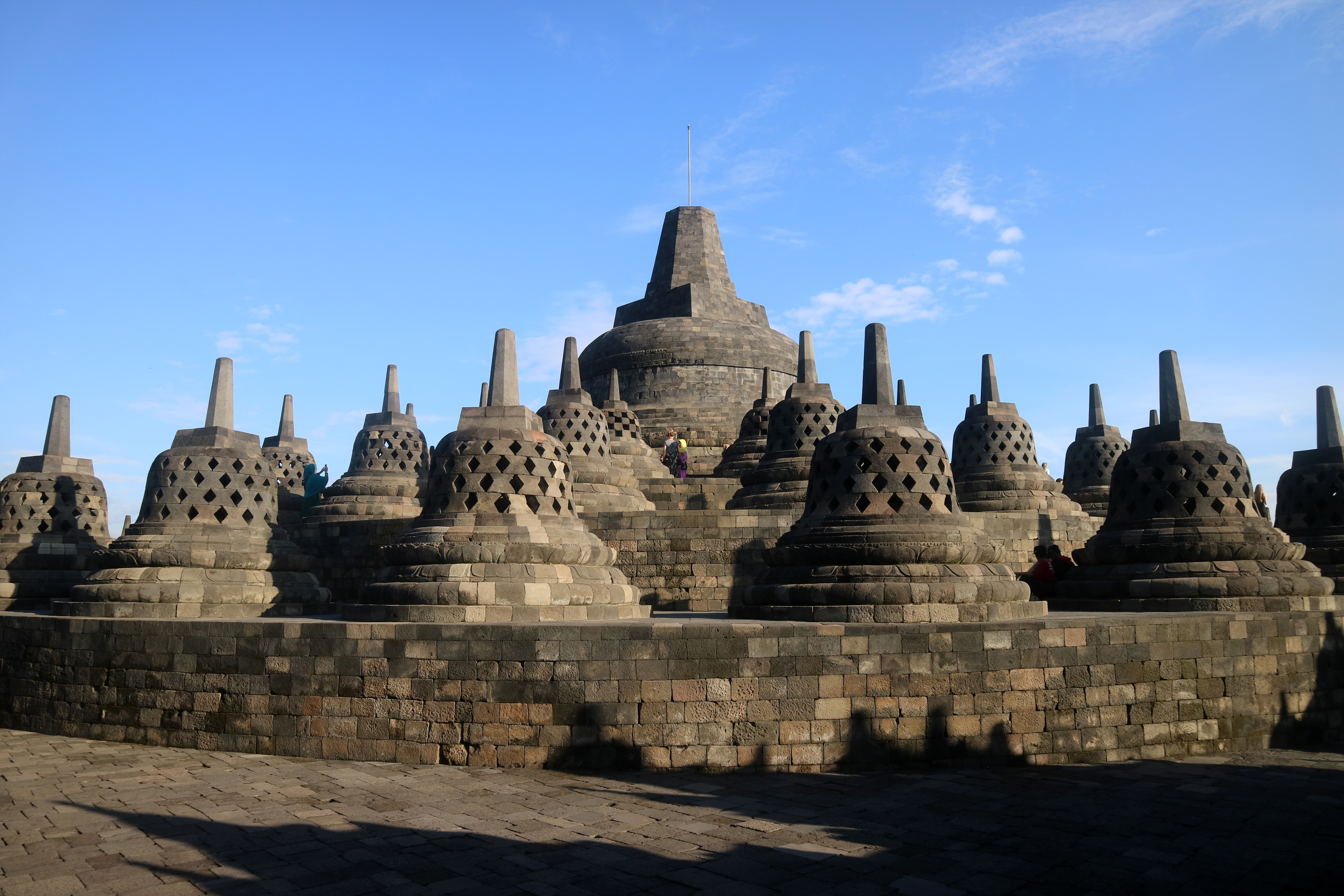
Stupas on upper terraces of Borobudur temple in Central Java.

From the 4th century to the 15th century, Hinduism and Buddhism shaped the culture of Indonesia. Kingdoms rose and fell, such as the Mataram kingdom, Srivijaya, Kediri, Singhasari and Majapahit. Together with the Indonesian classical history of the Hindu–Buddhist era, these kingdoms produced temples and monuments called candi. The best-preserved Buddhist shrine, which was built during the Sailendra dynasty in the 8th century, is Borobudur temple in Central Java. This temple is a giant stone mandala-shaped stepped pyramid that is adorned with bell-shaped stupas, ornamented with bas-reliefs of Buddha's stories and teachings.

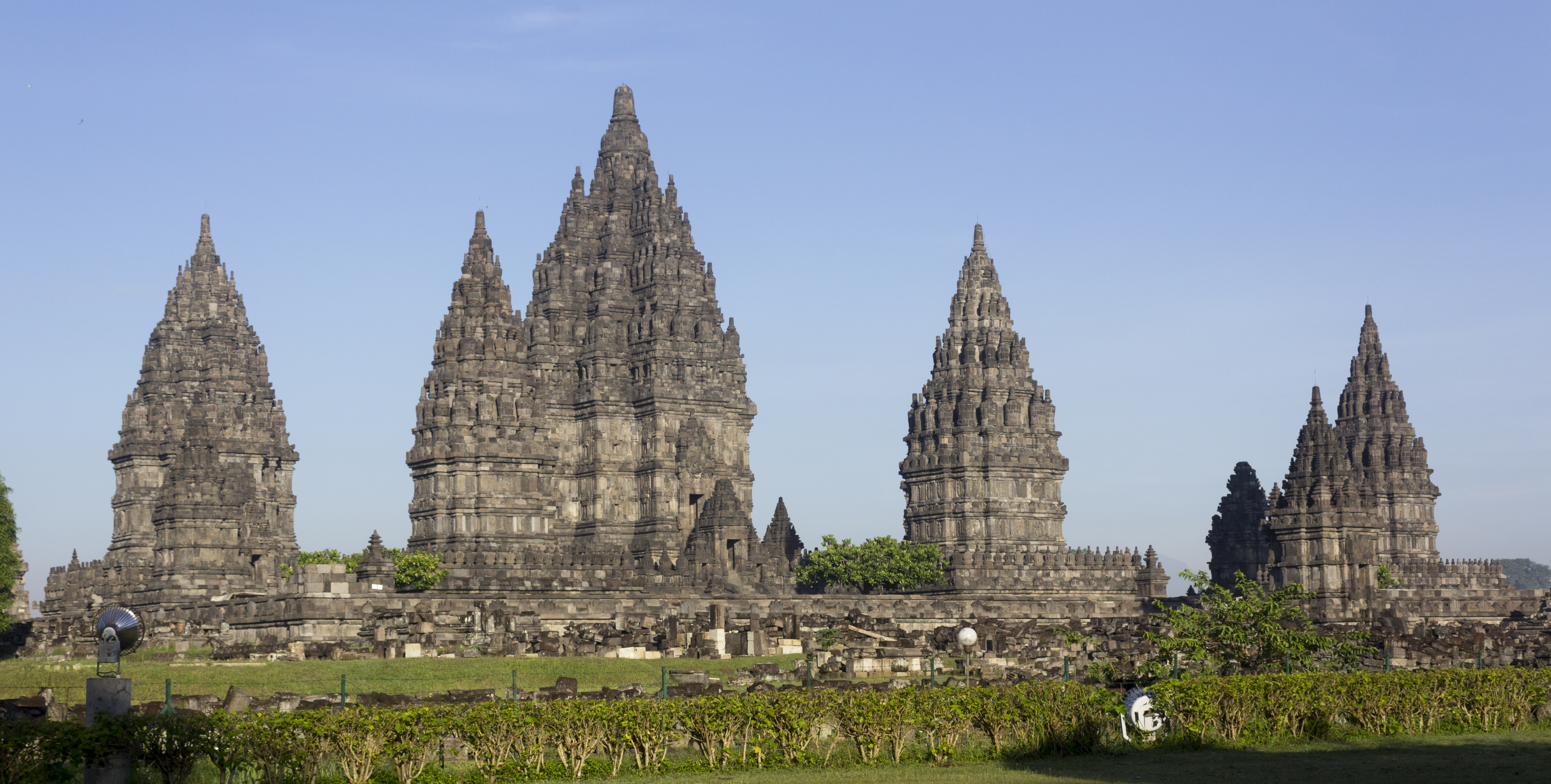
Prambanan Hindu temple near Yogyakarta.

A few kilometres southeast of Borobudur temple is the Prambanan complex, the largest Hindu temple in Indonesia, built during the second Mataram dynasty. The Prambanan temple is dedicated to Trimurti, Shiva, Vishnu and Brahma, the three highest gods in Hinduism. Both the Borobudur and the Prambanan temple compounds have been on the UNESCO World Heritage list since 1991. Both temples are large and popular, conveniently accessible from Yogyakarta, the centre of Javanese culture. The Ramayana Javanese dance is routinely performed on stage near Prambanan temple, providing visitors with a glimpse of Javanese classical culture.

In and around Yogyakarta, much ancient Javanese archaeology and many ancient temples are accessible by car or motorcycle. Although not as grand or popular as Borobudur and Prambanan, these smaller temples provide a glimpse of ancient culture and details of ancient Java temple architecture. Mendut and Pawon temples are on the Kedu Plain near Borobudur; Ratu Boko, Sewu, Lumbung, Plaosan, Kalasan, and Sari are on the Prambanan Plain near Prambanan temple.

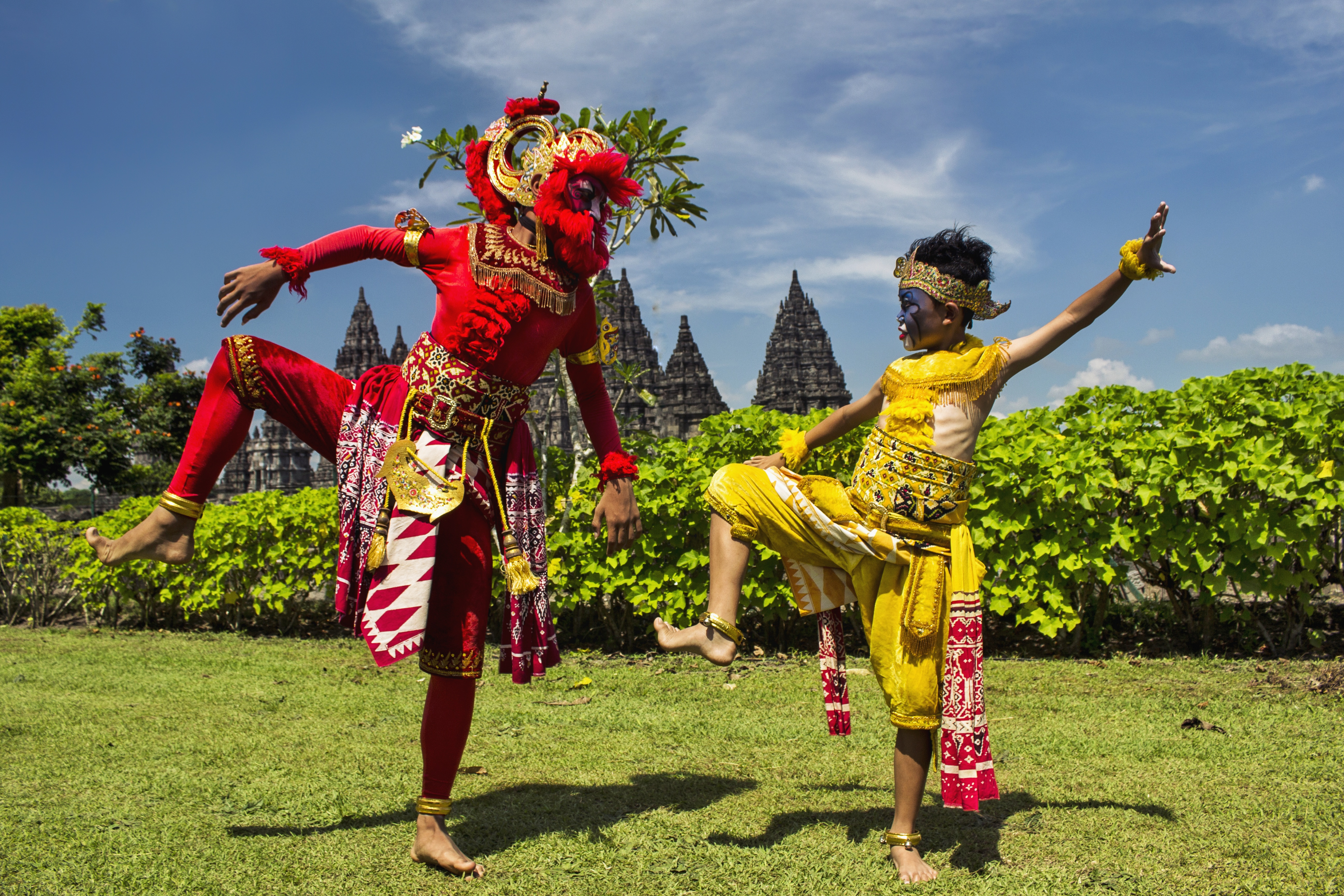
Cultural performance near Prambanan temple.

The temples of East Java date from the era of the Singhasari kingdom and the Majapahit empire, located primarily at the Trowulan archaeological site, as well as scattered around Blitar and Malang. Although not as grand and popular as the temples of Central Java, the East Javanese temples are also interesting destinations for candi and Indonesian ancient history. East Javanese temples include Wringin Lawang, Brahu, Bajang Ratu and Candi Tikus at the Trowulan archaeological site; the Jawi temple near Pandaan, south of Surabaya; the Penataran temple in Blitar; the Kidal temple; and the Singhasari temple near Malang.

Most major Indonesian archaeological sites feature museums, such as the Samudra Raksa Museum and the Karmawibhangga Museum in Borobudur, the Prambanan Museum in the Prambanan temple compounds, and the Trowulan Museum in the former Majapahit capital. Some archaeological discoveries are also displayed in municipal museums, such as Sonobudoyo Museum in Yogyakarta, Radyapustaka Museum in Surakarta and the Indonesian National Museum in Jakarta.

In addition, Sumatra contains several ancient Buddhist temples primarily linked to the Srivijaya kingdom; these temples include Muaro Jambi in Jambi province, Muara Takus in Riau, and Biaro Bahal in North Sumatra. Sumatran temples, however, are less elaborate than their Javanese counterparts, so they are less popular. (These temples are in rural locations, so renting a car is advisable for visiting them, since public transportation to those locations is scarce.)

=== Islamic heritage ===
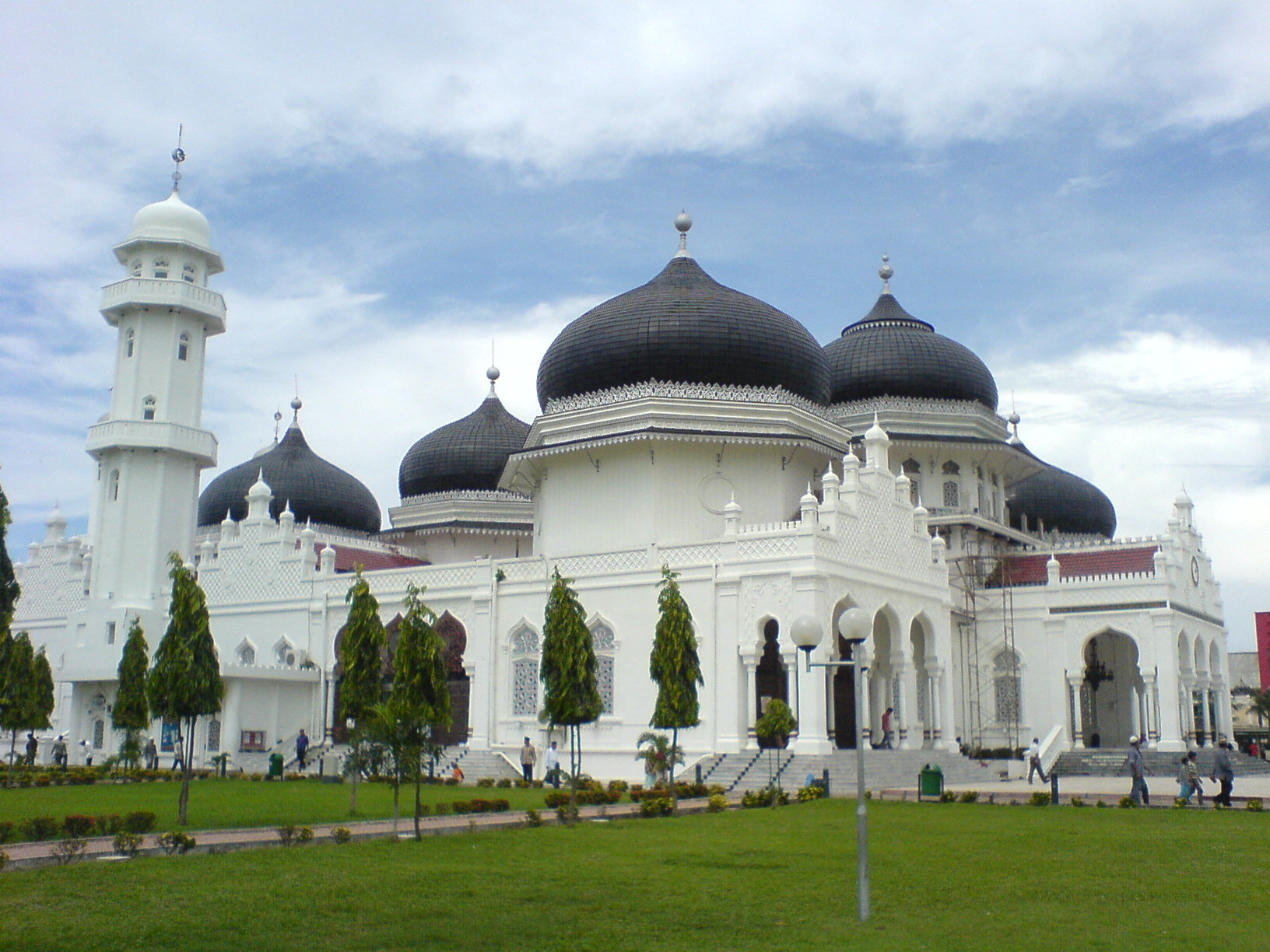
Baiturrahman Mosque in Aceh, an example of Islamic art and architecture in Indonesia

In addition, Islam has contributed significantly to culture and society in Indonesia. As of 2006, 88% of Indonesia's recorded population was Muslim. Islamic culture is prominent in Sumatra, and a few of the remaining sultanate palaces can be seen in Medan and Tanjung Pinang.

Islamic heritage tourism is popular, especially among Indonesian Muslims and Muslims from neighbouring countries – such as Malaysia, Singapore and Brunei – that share a Southeast Asian Islamic heritage. This tourist activity is usually tied to an Islamic ziyarat pilgrimage to historic Islamic sites, such as mosques and tombs of revered Islamic figures. However, for visitors to Islamic sites – either local or foreign, Muslim or non-Muslim – rules of conduct apply, and modest attire is required. For example, a visitor should remove footwear when entering mosques or makam (tombs); in addition, a visitor should not enter a site wearing shorts. (A sarong garment can usually be borrowed near a site's entrance, to cover a visitor's lower torso.)

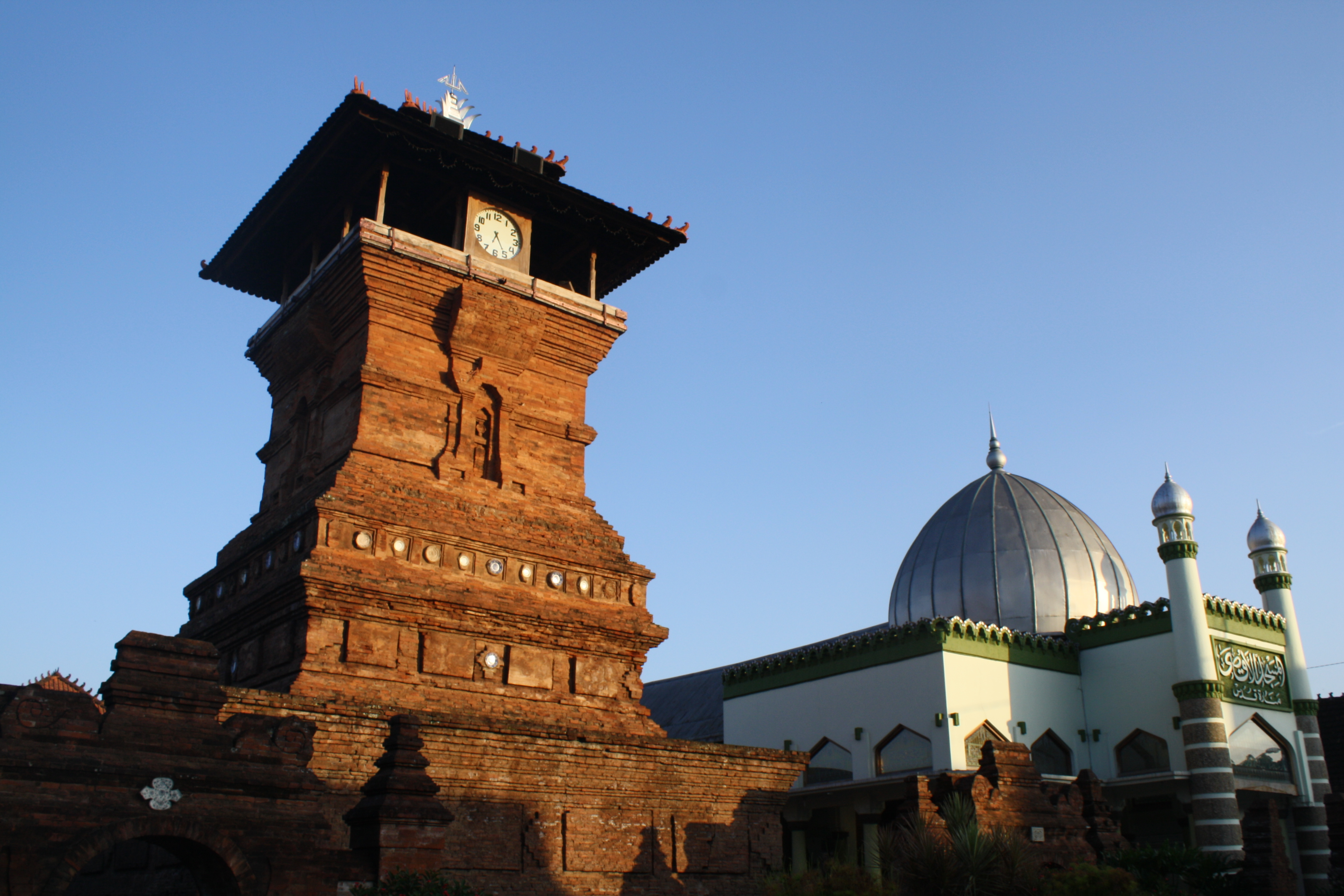
Menara Kudus Mosque combines Majapahit, Arab, and Javanese architecture in Indonesia.

In Aceh, the Baiturrahman Grand Mosque and the tombs of Aceh Sultanate kings are popular destinations; in Medan, the Medan Great Mosque and Maimun Palace are major Islamic heritage destinations. Most major Indonesian cities have their own historic or monumental Masjid Agung (Grand Mosque), which has become the city's landmark as well as a tourist attraction. Istiqlal Mosque, Jakarta – the Indonesian national mosque and the largest in Southeast Asia – is Jakarta's most significant landmark as well as a tourist attraction.

In Java, a ziyarat pilgrimage is usually linked to the historically important Islamic figures of Wali Sanga (Nine Saints). They are important because of their role in spreading Islam in Indonesia. Their tombs and mosques are in towns along Java's north coast, such as Demak, Kudus, Cirebon, Gresik, and Ampel in Surabaya. The 15th-century Agung Demak Mosque was the first mosque established in Java. Menara Kudus Mosque is notable for incorporating Majapahit Hindu–Javanese architecture. In addition, the tomb of Sunan Gunungjati near Cirebon is an important ziyarat site in West Java.

Heritage tourism might also focus on the era of the 17th- to 19th-century royal Javanese courts of the Yogyakarta Sultanate, the Surakarta Sunanate and Mangkunegaran.

=== Colonial heritage ===
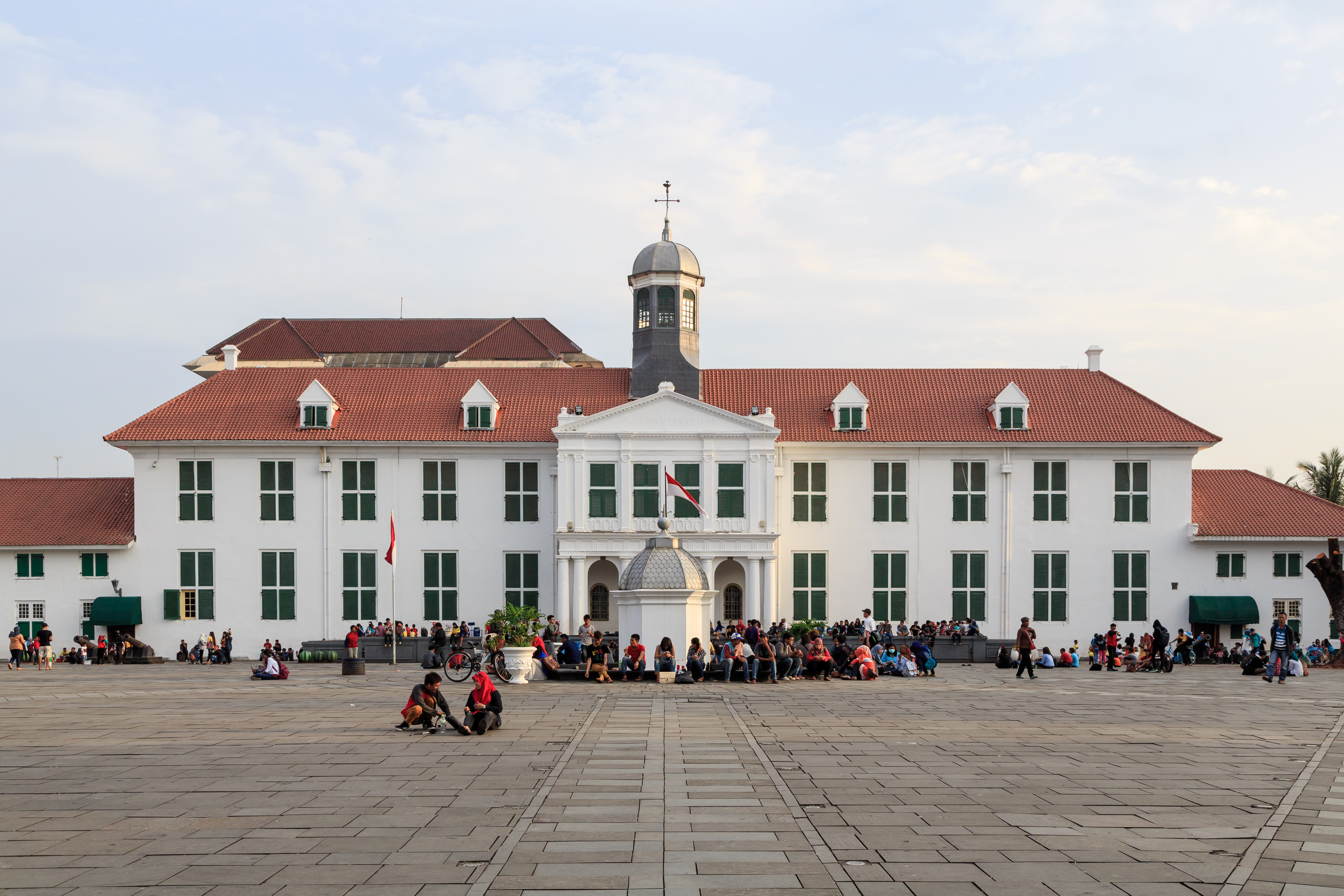
Former Batavia Stadhuis, now Jakarta History Museum in Kota Tua

Heritage tourism is focused on Indonesian history, such as the colonial architectural heritage of the Dutch East Indies era in Indonesia. Colonial heritage tourism mostly attracts visitors from the Netherlands who share historical ties with Indonesia, as well as other people interested in colonial history.

Tourist activities include visiting museums, churches, forts and historic colonial buildings, as well as spending nights in colonial heritage hotels. Popular heritage tourist attractions are in Kota – the centre of old Jakarta – with its Maritime Museum, Kota Intan drawbridge, Gereja Sion, Wayang Museum, Stadhuis Batavia, Fine Art and Ceramic Museum, Toko Merah, Bank Indonesia Museum, Bank Mandiri Museum, Jakarta Kota railway station, and Glodok (Jakarta Chinatown). In the old ports of Sunda Kelapa in Jakarta and Paotere in Makassar, tall-masted pinisi ships still sail. In addition, the neo-Gothic Jakarta Cathedral in Central Jakarta attracts visitors interested in architecture.

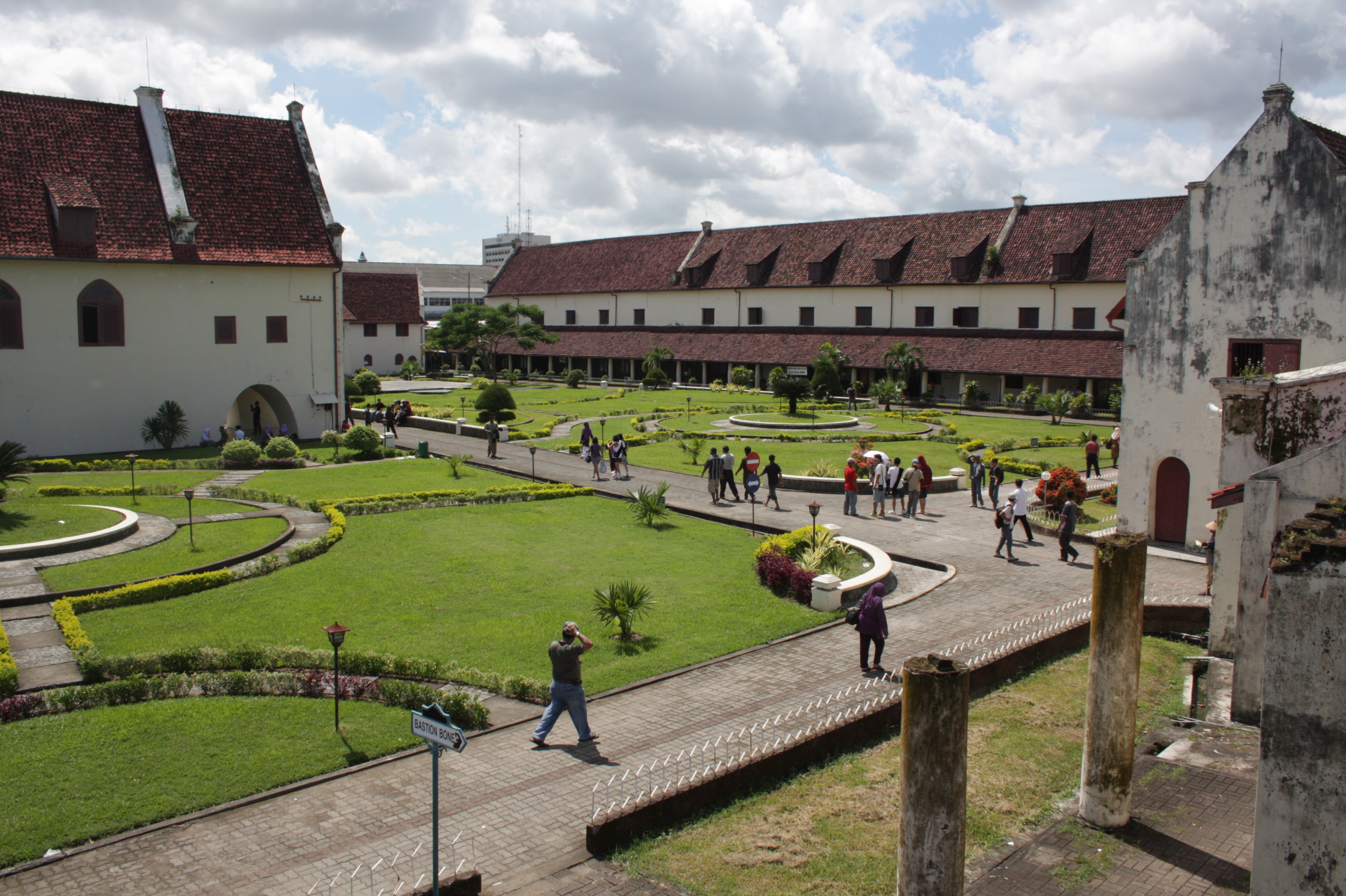
Fort Rotterdam, colonial heritage in Makassar

Bandung's historic avenue around Asia Afrika and Braga Street displays collections of Indies and Art Deco architecture from the early 20th century. Several hotels – such as Savoy Homann in Bandung and Hotel Majapahit in Surabaya – have a colonial heritage. The forts of the Dutch East India Company (Dutch: Vereenigde Oostindische Compagnie; VOC) can be found in Yogyakarta, Makassar, Bengkulu and Ambon. Colonial buildings can also be found in old town districts of various Indonesian cities, with notable buildings in Semarang, Surabaya, Malang, Medan and Sawahlunto.

=== Village tourism ===
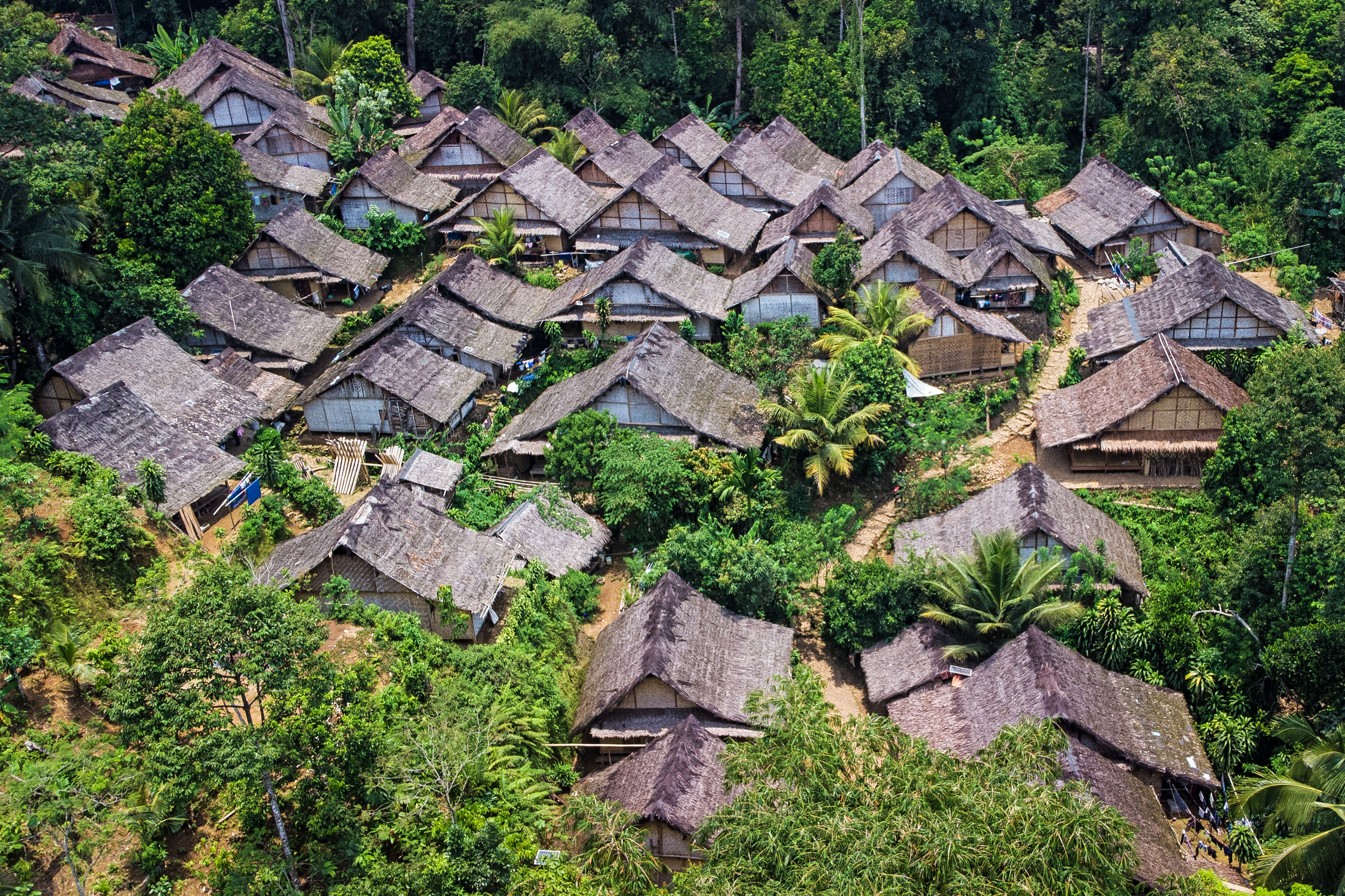
Desa wisata Baduy, a traditional village in Banten.

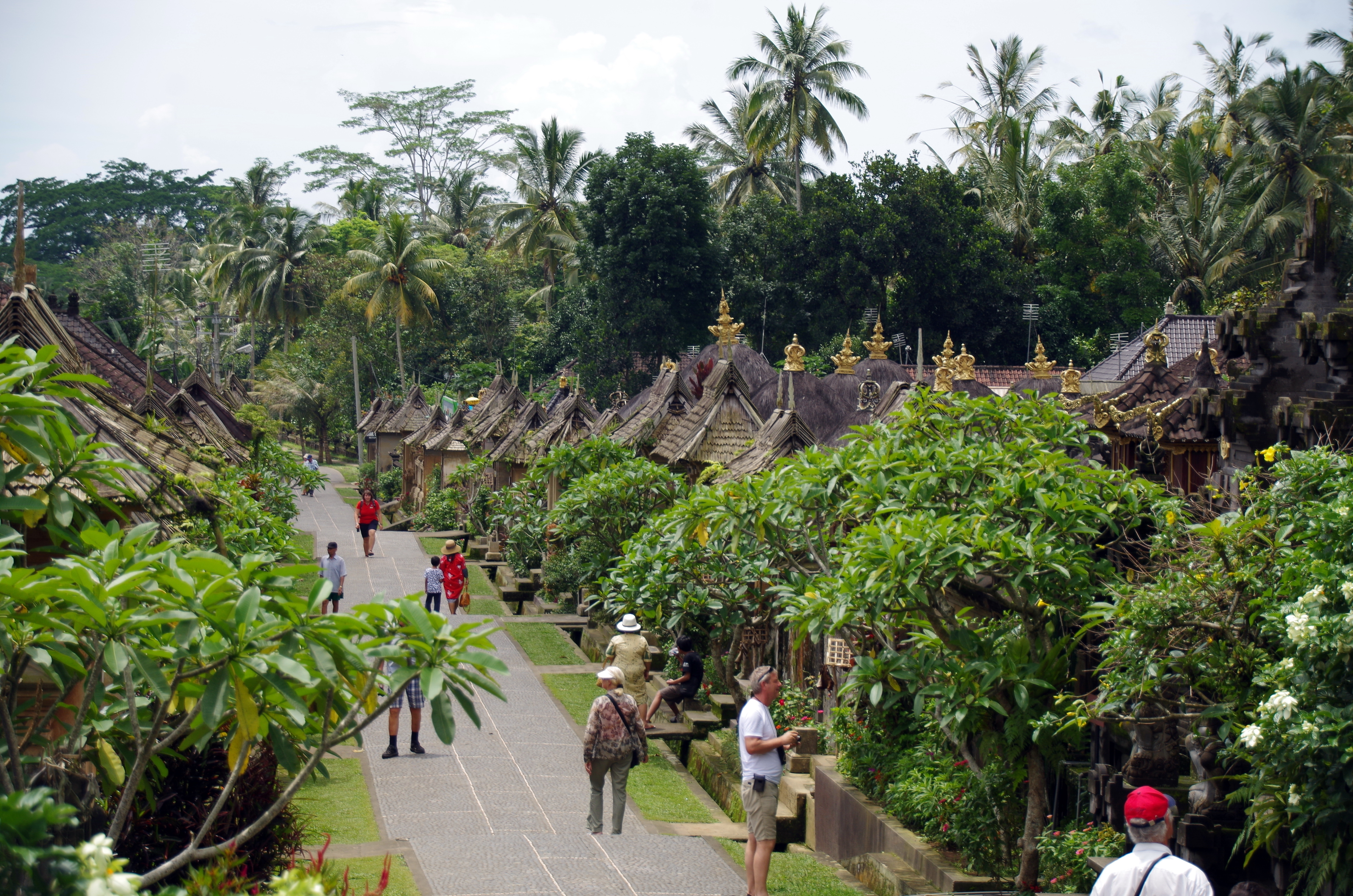
Penglipuran Village, recognised as one of the world's cleanest villages, is located in Bali.

Village tourism (Indonesian: desa wisata) is a concept in Indonesia to integrate attraction, activity, accommodation, and supporting facilities within a specific area, called a desa or a village, to maximize the local tourism potential. Unlike popular resort areas that are primarily owned by global hotel chains, village tourism usually features small-scale family- or community-owned accommodations: boarding houses, guest houses, bed and breakfasts, lodges, taverns, restaurants or warung shops. This community-based tourism model is intended to support the local economy, create jobs, and empower the local community.

Tourism potential may include natural points of interest, specific foods, local activities, festivals, crafts, arts and cultural events that are unique to an area. Indonesia has 1,734 tourism villages, most of them in Java and Bali.

== Leisure and urban tourism ==
Leisure and urban tourism includes shopping, sightseeing in large cities, and enjoying modern amusement parks, nightlife and entertainment. To some extent, urban tourism may also involve municipal culture and heritage tourism, such as visits to city museums or parts of a colonial old town.

=== Shopping ===
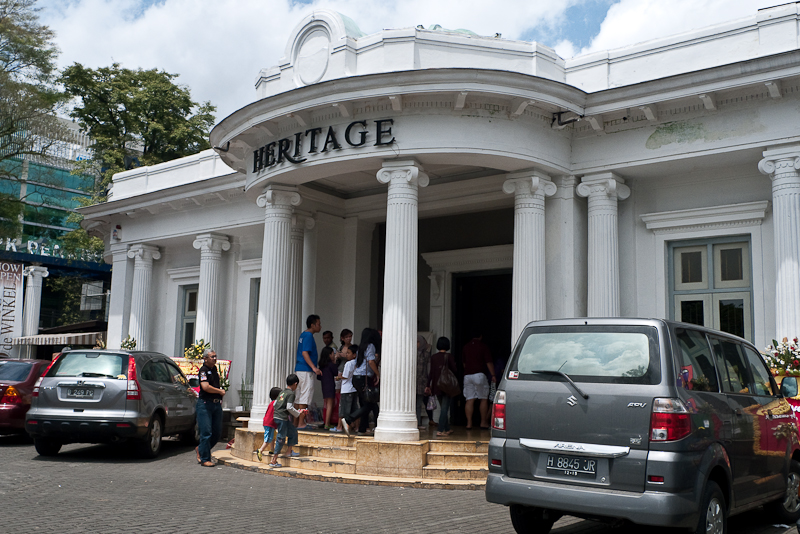
Bandung with its boutiques, distribution stores and factory outlets, is well-known to locals and foreign visitors for shopping in Indonesia

The nation's capital, Jakarta, offers many locations for shopping. Mal Kelapa Gading – the largest mall, with 130,000 square metres (1,400,000 sq ft) – and Plaza Senayan, Senayan City, Grand Indonesia, Sarinah, and Plaza Indonesia are some of the city's shopping malls. Besides high-end shopping centres with branded products, Indonesia is also a destination for handicraft shopping in the region. Certain Indonesian traditional crafts – such as batik, songket, ikat weaving, embroidery, wooden statues and fashion products – are popular souvenirs for visitors.

Indonesian textile and fashion products are known for offering value – good quality with reasonable prices. Bandung is a popular shopping destination for fashion products among Malaysians and Singaporeans. Bali has many shopping centres, for instance, the Kuta shopping centre and the Galeria Nusa Dua.

=== Amusement and theme parks ===
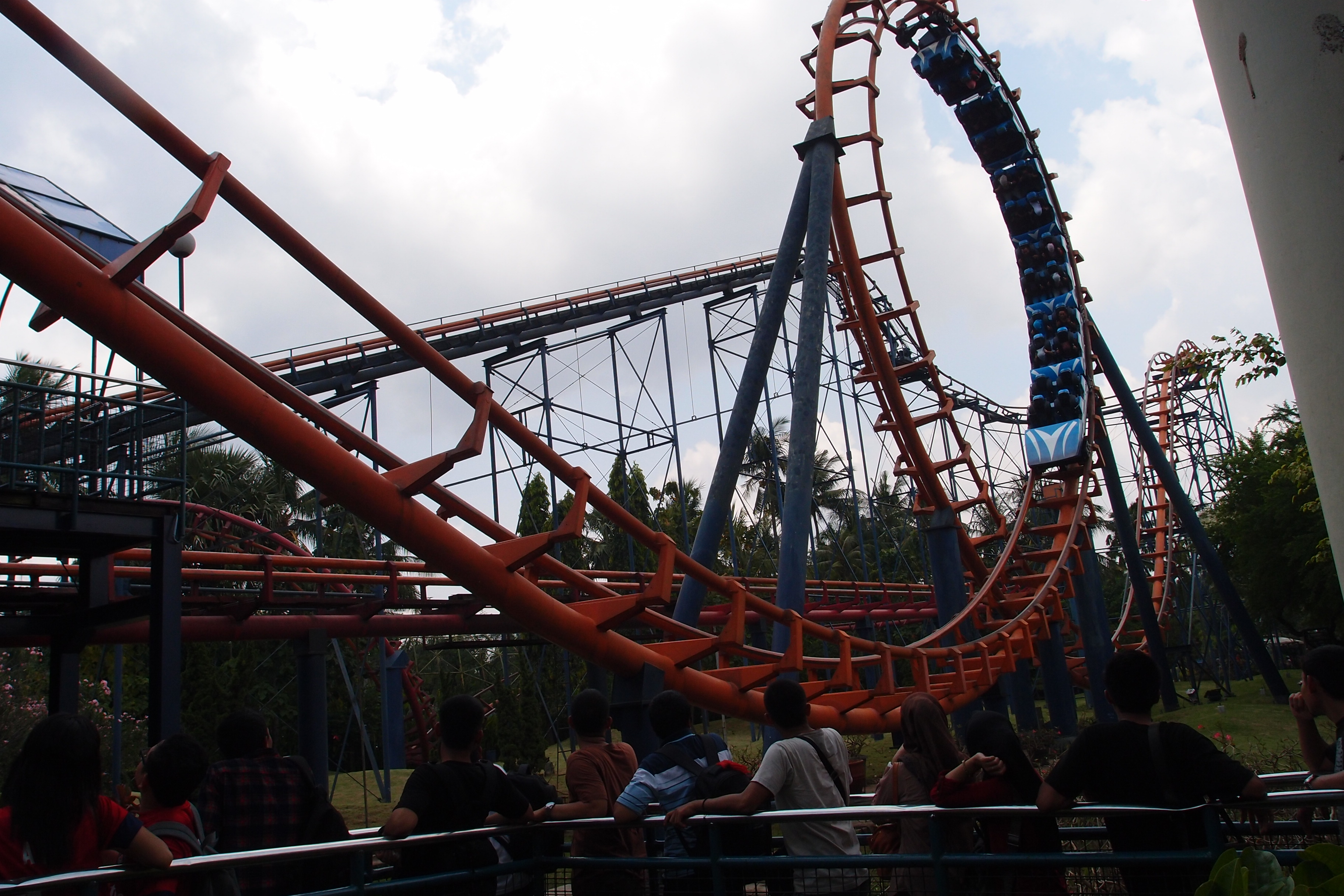
Halilintar, an amusement park in Dunia Fantasi, Jakarta

Amusement parks are popular destinations for Indonesian families. Ancol Dreamland, with Dunia Fantasi theme park and Atlantis Water Adventure, is Jakarta's version of a Disneyland-style amusement park and water park. Several similar theme parks have also developed in other cities, such as Trans Studio Makassar and Trans Studio Bandung.

Taman Mini Indonesia Indah (TMII) is one of the larger theme parks.

=== Gastronomic tourism ===
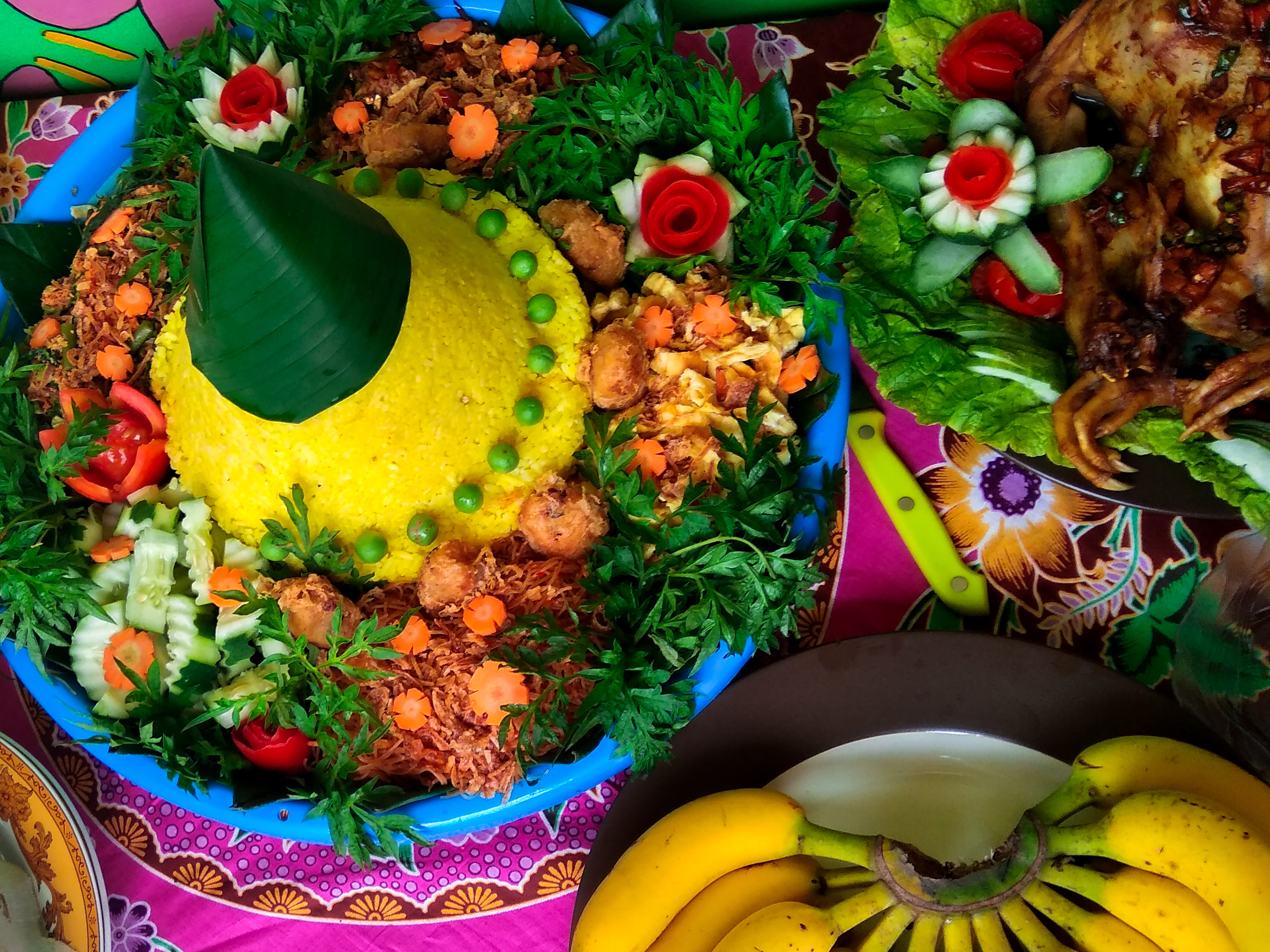
Tumpeng, an example of Javanese cuisine

Indonesia has rich and diverse culinary traditions. Rendang was recently voted the number one dish on CNN International's 'World's 50 Most Delicious Foods' list. Many regional cuisines exist, often based upon indigenous culture and foreign influences. Indonesian cuisine varies by region and has multiple influences. Some popular Indonesian dishes such as nasi goreng, sate, and soto are widespread around the country and have regional variations. These dishes are considered Indonesian national dishes.

Eating establishments in Indonesia range from street-side cart vendors to fine-dining restaurants. Most malls and shopping centres in major Indonesian cities have full-floor food courts, where a person can sample a variety of Indonesian cuisines. Some Indonesian cities have their own signature dishes: Mie Aceh, Padang's rendang, Palembang's pempek, Jakarta's soto betawi and gado-gado, Bandung's siomay and batagor, Yogyakarta's gudeg, Solo's tongseng, Semarang's lumpia, Surabaya's rawon, Madura's satay, Balinese nasi campur and babi panggang, Makassar's konro, Manado's tinutuan, and Chinese Indonesian mie goreng. There are also regional food fairs and festivals, such as the Jakarta Fair, which offers local delicacies and food products from around Indonesia, and the Jakarta Fashion & Food Festival (JFFF), which features food and fashion.

=== Wellness and spas ===
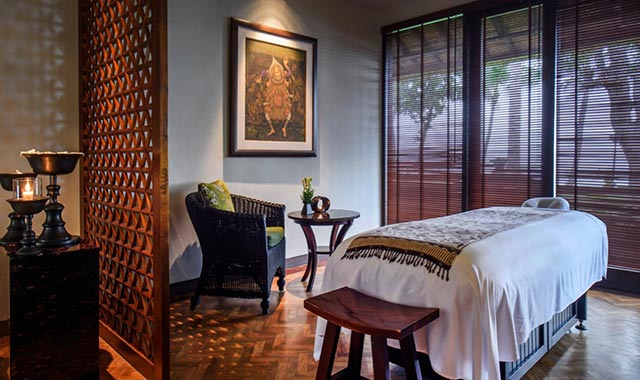
A spa suite in Legian, Bali

Indonesia has a tradition of health and beauty treatments. However, the wellness tourism business became particularly popular in Java and Bali in the 2000s. In 2009 and 2012, Indonesia won international awards as the best spa destination.

Indonesians – especially in Java and Bali – have traditional wellness treatments for health, beauty and wellbeing. Such traditional treatments include Javanese Jamu herbal medicine, as well as Javanese and Balinese massage. Spas, fitness centres, and yoga classes are available for tourists in major Indonesian cities, especially in Bali, Yogyakarta, Jakarta and Bandung. The Tourism Ministry of Indonesia has promoted Indonesia as a spa and wellness destination through multiple exhibitions.

Built in 1758, the Taman Sari of Yogyakarta is a water castle that functioned as a pleasure garden for Sultan Hamengkubuwono I, his concubines and the royal family. This palace – equipped with rooms and bathing pools – was a place to cleanse, purify and energize body and soul, though it was restricted to the king and royals; the palace was effectively an 18th-century royal spa. Javanese royal treatments included Jamu herbal medicine, traditional massage, luluran (herbal body scrub), bathing and aromatherapy.

In 2019, the Indonesian Tourism Ministry partnered with the Indonesian Health Ministry to provide health tourism in four sectors: medical tourism, wellness tourism and Jamu, sports tourism, and academic health tourism.

=== Golfing ===
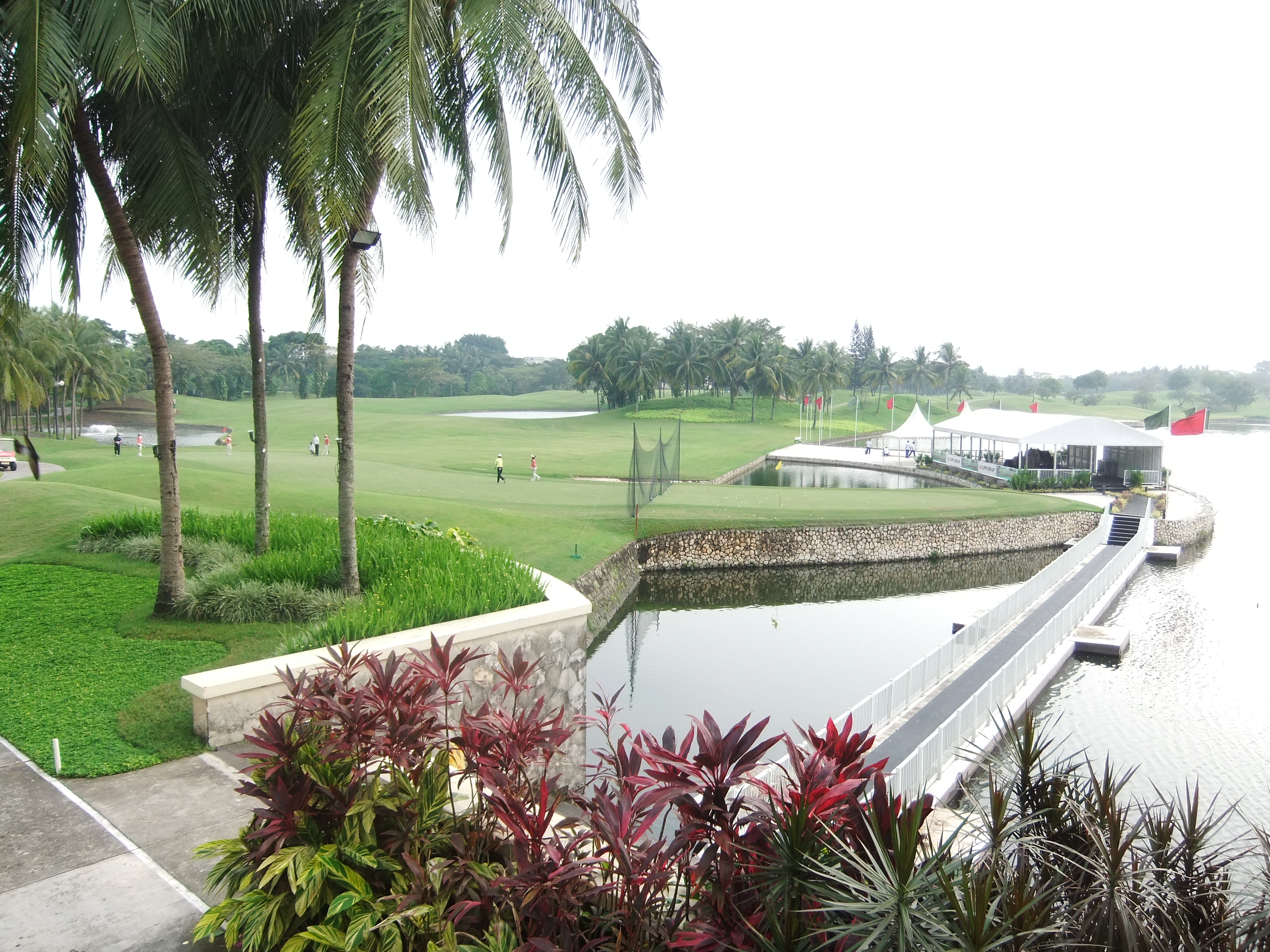
A golf course in Karawaci, Greater Jakarta area

A popular tourist activity is golfing, a favourite sport of upper-class Indonesians and foreigners. Indonesia has around 150 golf courses. These are concentrated mostly in Greater Jakarta, West Java, East Java, Bali, Bintan and Batam. Bali, West Java and Yogyakarta have well-designed golf courses, either by the sea or in the highlands overlooking volcanoes. Some notable golf courses include Taman Dayu in Pasuruan, East Java; Ria Bintan; Damai Indah Golf; Bumi Serpong Damai Tangerang; Rancamaya near Bogor; New Kuta Golf in Bali; and Merapi Golf near Yogyakarta.

=== Nightlife ===
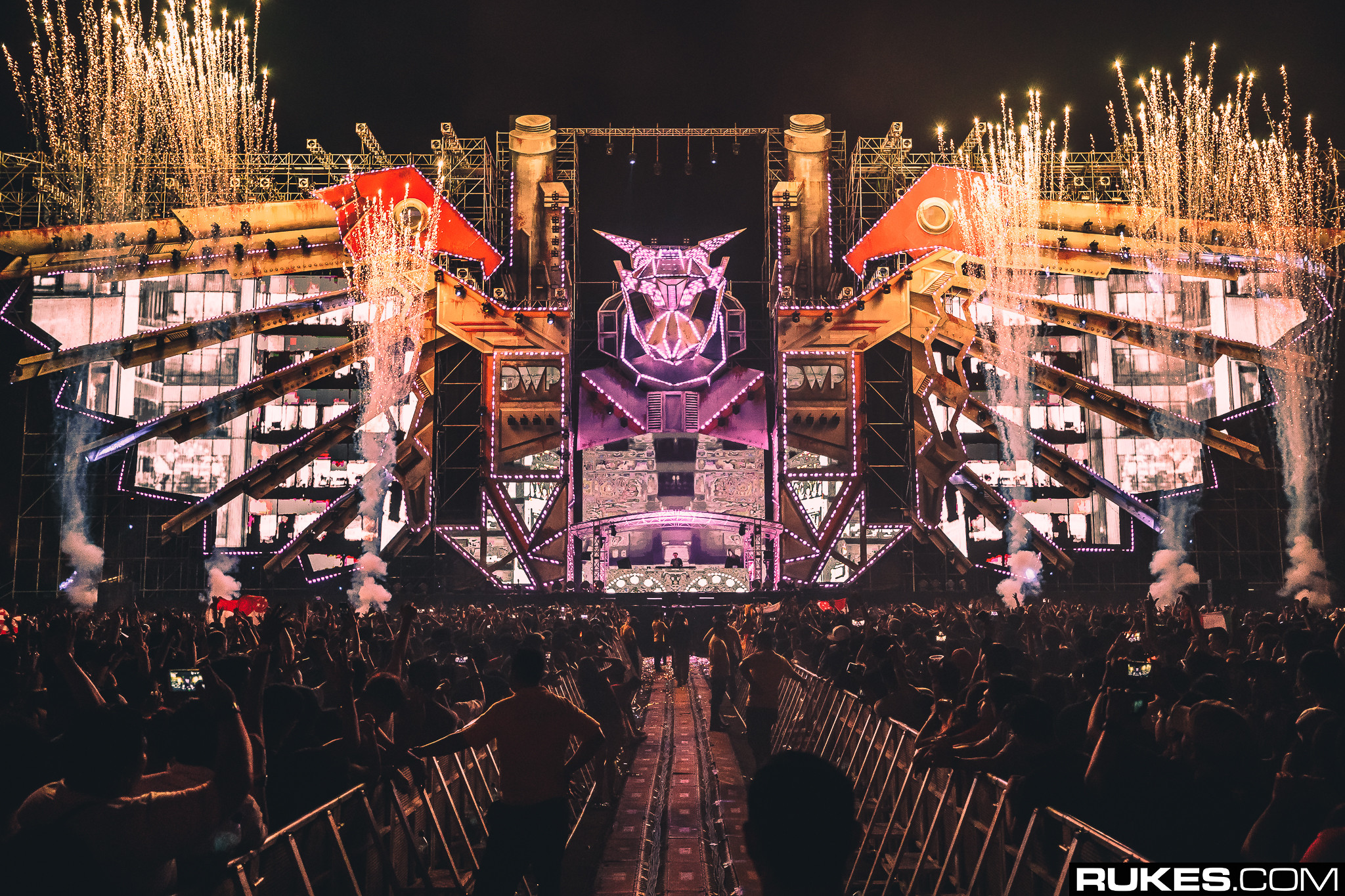
The Garuda main stage of the Djakarta Warehouse Project 2017

Indonesia's nightlife is popular among foreigners as well, especially in big cities such as Jakarta, Bandung, Surabaya, Manado, Denpasar and Medan. Jakarta and Bali, for example, are popular for nightlife and festivals, as both feature many discotheques and clubs. The annual dance music festival called the Djakarta Warehouse Project is one of the largest electronic dance music events in Asia.

=== Sex tourism ===
International sex tourism and child sex tourism remain issues, especially on the islands of Batam and Karimun, as well as in major urban centres and tourist destinations around the country, including Bali and Riau Islands. In Indonesia, prostitution is illegal and seen as a "crime against decency and morality". In practice, however, prostitution is widespread, tolerated, and partially regulated – though mostly illegal or underground in discotheques, massage parlours and karaoke rooms, and also on particular streets. An estimated 40,000 to 70,000 Indonesian children are exploited for prostitution within the country. Prostitution is practiced by both genders, with Bali being notorious for its 'Kuta Cowboys' – local gigolos targeting female foreign tourists.

== Transportation ==
=== International airports ===
Ngurah Rai International Airport in Bali, a main gateway for international visitors entering Indonesia

Each of the larger Indonesian islands has at least one international airport. The largest and busiest airport in Indonesia is Soekarno-Hatta International Airport in Jakarta, followed by Juanda International Airport in Surabaya. There are four international airports in Java: Halim Perdanakusuma International Airport, Yogyakarta International Airport, Jenderal Ahmad Yani International Airport and Kertajati International Airport.

Bali, popular with tourists, contains the I Gusti Ngurah Rai International Airport, which is the third busiest in Indonesia and a main entry point for foreign visitors.

There are seven international airports in Sumatra: Kualanamu International Airport in Medan, Sultan Iskandar Muda International Airport in Banda Aceh, Sultan Syarif Kasim II International Airport in Pekanbaru, Minangkabau International Airport in Padang, Sultan Mahmud Badaruddin II International Airport in Palembang, Hang Nadim International Airport in Batam, and H.A.S. Hanandjoeddin International Airport in Tanjung Pandan.

In Kalimantan, there are three international airports: Supadio International Airport in Pontianak, Sultan Aji Muhammad Sulaiman Sepinggan International Airport in Balikpapan, and Syamsudin Noor International Airport in Banjarmasin. In Sulawesi, there are two international airports: Sam Ratulangi International Airport in Manado and Sultan Hasanuddin International Airport in Makassar (which is a hub serving central and eastern Indonesia, as well as the country's fourth busiest airport).

Other international airports in Indonesia include Sentani International Airport in Jayapura, Lombok International Airport on the island of Lombok, and Komodo International Airport on the island of Flores.

=== Other transportation ===
==== Trains ====
Indonesia is an archipelagic country. There are several ways to explore it. As alternatives to airplanes, trains, ships and buses are available. Local transportation can be used to explore the country; trains can be used to travel between cities. For example, tourists can explore the island of Java by taking a train from Jakarta to Yogyakarta in order to visit Borobudur. Indonesia offers fast train service between Jakarta and Bandung, as well as local train services in the Jakarta area.

==== Buses ====
Many bus companies operate in the country, both within and between cities.

==== Angkot ====
An angkot (shared taxi) is a small car used for local transportation.

==== Taxis ====
There are several taxi operators in the city. Major cities also offer online taxi services.

==== Motorcycles ====
There are online motorcycle services.

== Marketing ==
=== Destination Management Organization ===
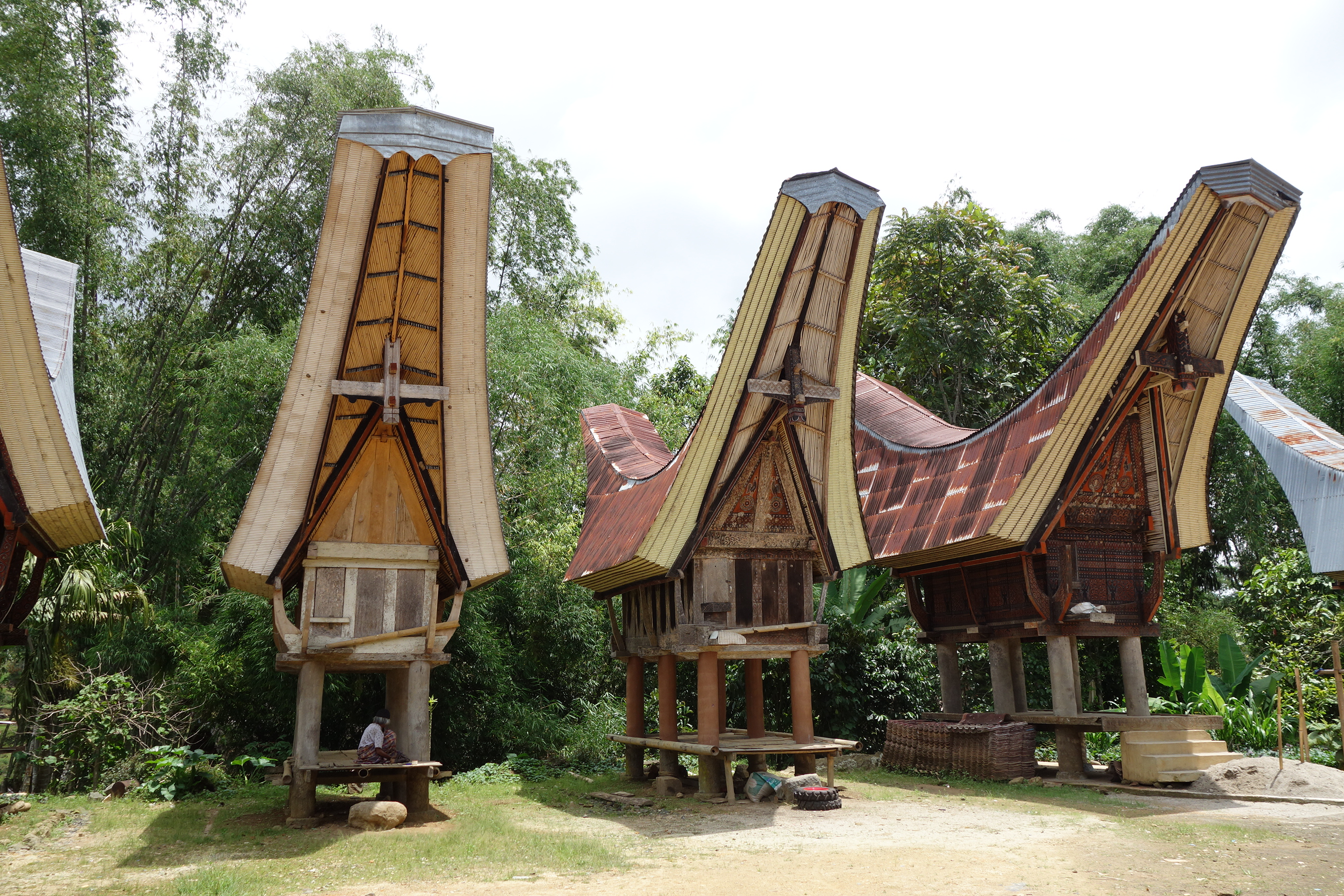
Tana Toraja in South Sulawesi, an area targeted by the Destination Management Organization in Indonesia

Indonesia's central government has the Destination Management Organization (DMO), an integrated promotion and management program which involves all stakeholders in the tourism industry, including local authorities, business owners and people. In 2010–2014, the DMO targeted 15 areas: Sabang, Toba, Jakarta Old City Area, Pangandaran, Borobudur, Tanjung Puting, Bromo-Tengger-Semeru, Batur Bali Area, Rinjani, Derawan Islands, Toraja, Bunaken, Wakatobi, Raja Ampat, and Komodo-Kelimutu-Flores.

=== Indonesian tourism campaigns ===
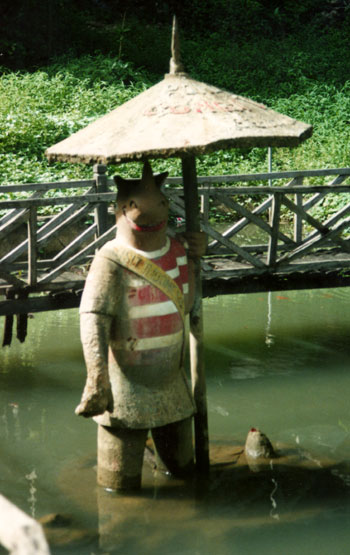
The rhinoceros was the mascot of Visit Indonesia Year 1991.

The Indonesian government authority that is officially responsible for the country's tourism sector is the Ministry of Culture and Tourism of Indonesia. Several campaigns to promote Indonesian tourism have been launched, either by the government or the private sector, through media such as print, television and online.

==== Visit Indonesia Year 1991 ====
Indonesia learned from the success of neighbouring countries – such as Thailand, Singapore and Malaysia – which successfully benefited from and exploited their tourism sectors through intensive promotions. In the early 1990s, the Indonesian government launched integrated efforts to promote Indonesian tourism worldwide. The first integrated campaign was named Visit Indonesia Year, and its first year was Visit Indonesia Year 1991.

==== Visit Indonesia Year 2008 ====
The Indonesian Ministry of Culture and Tourism declared 2008 as a Visit Indonesia Year. The campaign Visit Indonesia Year 2008 was launched on 26 December 2007. The branding for this campaign used the concept of Garuda Pancasila – Indonesia's national emblem – for the country's way of life. The five components of Pancasila were represented by five coloured lines that symbolised Indonesian "unity in diversity". The target number of tourists was seven million. The campaign also commemorated the 100th anniversary of Indonesia's national awakening in 1908.

==== Visit Indonesia Year 2009 ====
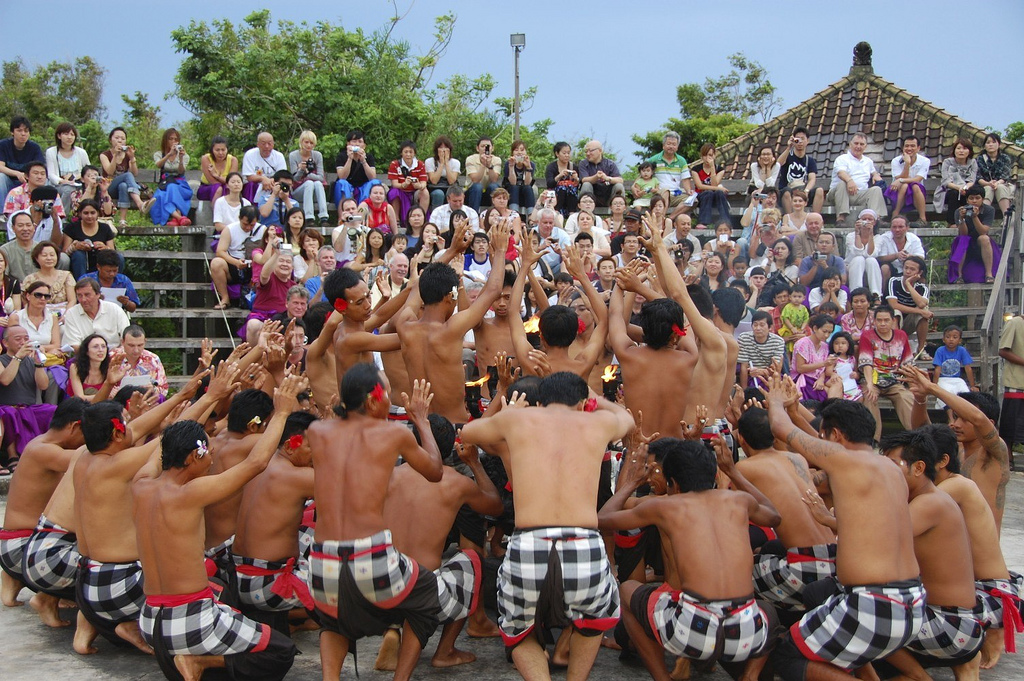
Kecak dance performance as a tourist attraction in Bali.

Tourism Indonesia Mart & Expo (TIME) 2009 was held at Santosa Villas & Resort in Senggigi on the west coast of Lombok, Nusa Tenggara Barat (NTB). Entering its 16th year, TIME 2009 was organised by the Indonesian Tourism Promotion Board, and it received support from many tour participants in Indonesia.

TIME 2009 attracted 127 buyers from 25 countries. The top six buyers came from Korea, India, Malaysia, Indonesia, the United States and the Netherlands. TIME 2009 also attracted a total of 250 seller delegates from 97 Indonesian companies, occupying 84 booths at the exhibition. Sellers came from 15 provinces, led by West Nusa Tenggara, Jakarta, Bali, Central Java, and East Kalimantan as the top five sellers. The percentages of sellers by industry were as follows:

- hotel, resort and spa (75%)
- NTO (10%)
- tour operator/travel agent (7%)
- adventure/activity holiday (3%)
- airline (1.5%)
- other – hotel management, tourism board, tourism organisation and travel portal(8.5%)

During the 2008 financial crisis, TIME 2009 recorded an estimated transaction value of $17.48 million; this was an increase of 15% from the previous TIME in Makassar, South Sulawesi, in 2008.

==== Visit Indonesia Year 2010 ====
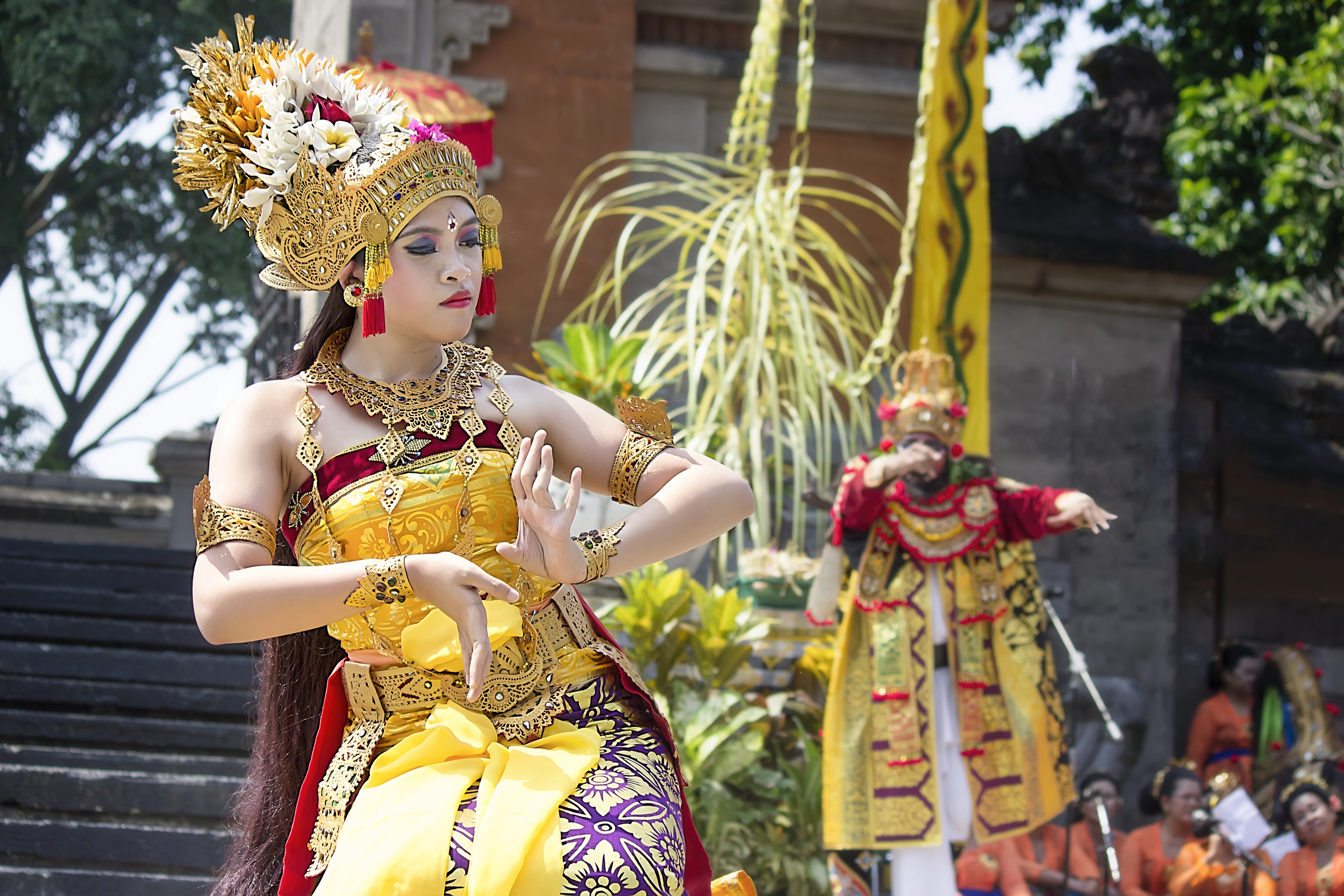
Cultural performances such as Balinese Ramayana traditional dance are popular tourist attractions, especially in Ubud, Bali.

After TIME was held on the island of Lombok in 2009, the event was again held in Lombok–Sumbawa on 12–15 October 2010 at Santosa Villas & Resort in Senggigi, on the west coast of Lombok. Entering its 16th year, TIME was organised by the Indonesian Tourism Promotion Board and supported by many tour participants in Indonesia. TIME 2010 was supported by the travel and tourism industry in Indonesia, including the Ministry of Culture & Tourism, the Provincial Government of West Nusa Tenggara, the West Nusa Tenggara Culture & Tourism Office, Lombok Sumbawa Promo, Garuda Indonesia (as the official airline), other supporting airlines, the Indonesia National Air Carriers Association (INACA), the Board of Airline Representatives Indonesia (BARINDO), the Association of Indonesian Tours & Travel Agencies (ASITA), the Indonesia Hotels and Restaurant Association (PHRI), the Indonesian Conference and Convention Association (INCCA), Pacto Convex (as the event organiser), and national and international media. Lombok and Sumbawa in West Nusa Tenggara set a target of attracting one million tourists to visit the islands by 2012.

==== Wonderful Indonesia (since 2011) ====
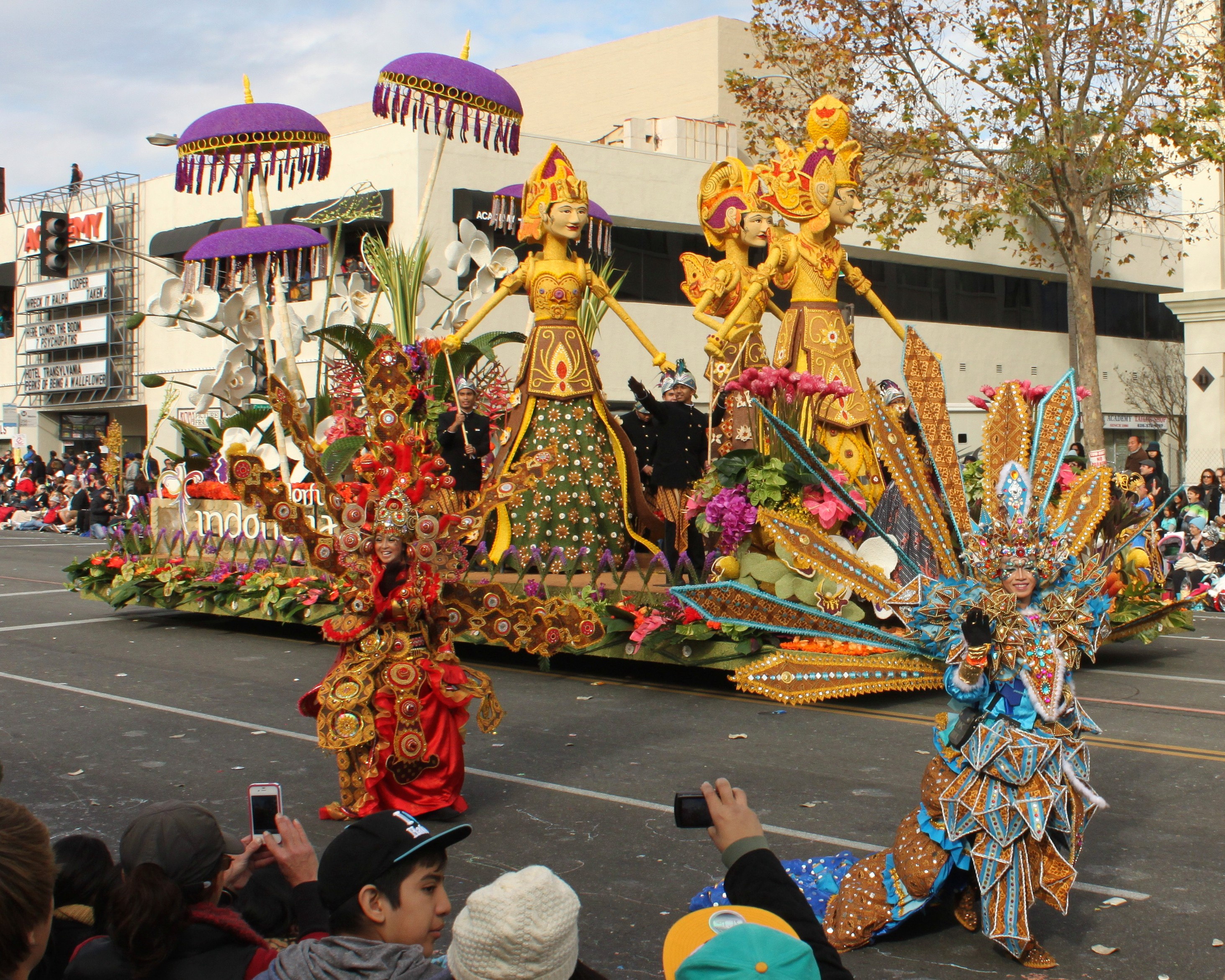
Indonesian floral float, depicting wayang golek wooden puppets in the Pasadena Rose Parade 2013.

Since January 2011, "Wonderful Indonesia" has been the slogan of an international marketing campaign directed by the Indonesian Ministry of Culture and Tourism. This campaign replaced the previous Visit Indonesia Year campaign, which had been used since 1991. The Wonderful Indonesia concept highlights Indonesia's "wonderful" nature, cultures, people, food, and affordability. After the campaign was launched, Indonesia reported an increase in foreign visitors: 7,002,944 in 2010; 7,649,731 in 2011; and 8,044,462 in 2012.

In late January 2011, Culture and Tourism Minister Jero Wacik announced that Wonderful Indonesia would replace the previous Visit Indonesia Year branding used by the nation's official tourism promotional campaigns, although the stylised Garuda logo persisted. The minister announced that in 2010, foreign tourists visiting Indonesia reached 7 million, and he predicted 7.7 million in 2011. He reportedly described the new branding as reflecting the country's beautiful nature, unique culture, varied food, hospitable people and price competitiveness. "We expect each tourist will spend around $1,100 and with an optimistic target of 7.7 million arrivals, we will get $8.3 billion" from this campaign. The Culture and Tourism Minister added that 50% of the revenue would be generated from about 600 meetings, conventions and exhibitions that were expected to take place around the country in 2011. He added in the announcements of January 2011 that his ministry would promote the country's attractions under an eco-cultural banner.

==== Pesona Indonesia (since 2014) ====
In December 2014, the new minister of tourism, Arief Yahya, launched the new brand Pesona Indonesia, targeting the domestic tourism market. Both Wonderful Indonesia and Pesona Indonesia share the Garuda logo. The minister hopes that both brands will offer a single tourism identity for Indonesia.

==== 2016 ====
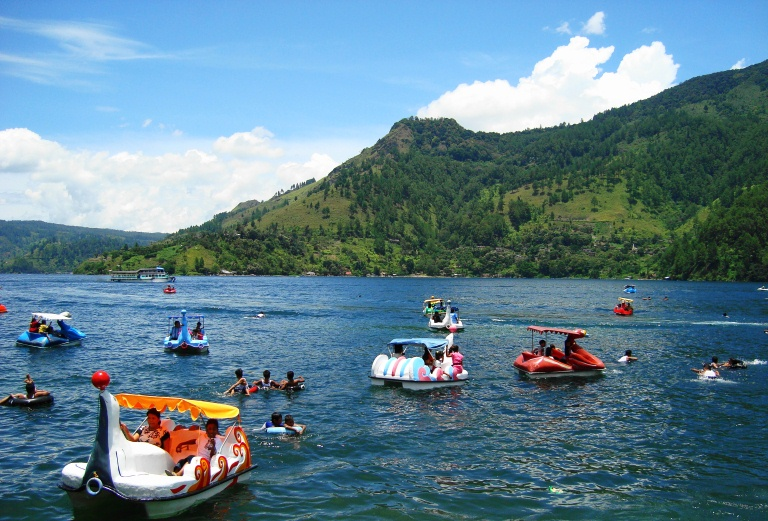
Lake Toba in North Sumatra, one of the 10 Priority Tourism Destinations

Most often, Indonesian tourism relies on Bali's charms to attract tourists. As a result, most foreign visitors are concentrated in Bali, which already has a well-developed tourism culture and infrastructure. To distribute tourism wealth and generate tourism-related economic opportunities among Indonesian provinces, the tourism authority launched a program to create and add new centres of attraction as alternatives to Bali.

In mid-2016, the Indonesian Ministry of Tourism launched a program named "10 Priority Tourism Destinations (Indonesian: 10 Destinasi Wisata Prioritas)" dubbed "the new Bali". These destinations are as follows: Borobudur temple, Lake Toba, Mount Bromo, Komodo National Park, Kepulauan Seribu, Mandalika, Wakatobi Islands, Tanjung Kelayang beach, Tanjung Lesung beach, and Morotai island.

These efforts included creating and improving tourism infrastructure facilities – including hotels, homestays, restaurants, handicraft and souvenir art markets – and improving interconnections among these regions by improving and constructing new airports. In practice, by 2017, only 4 of these 10 priorities had been launched, as well as received full government attention and support: Lake Toba in North Sumatra, Borobudur in Central Java, Labuan Bajo as the gateway to Komodo National Park, and Mandalika in Lombok.

== Challenges to the tourism industry ==
Travel warnings
Australia	21 Aug 2006	All Indonesia	Terrorist threats
United Kingdom	21 Aug 2006	All Indonesia	Terrorist threats
United Kingdom	21 Aug 2006	Maluku, Central Sulawesi, Aceh	Regional conflicts
United States	3 Jan 2015	Surabaya	Terrorist threats

=== Terrorism ===
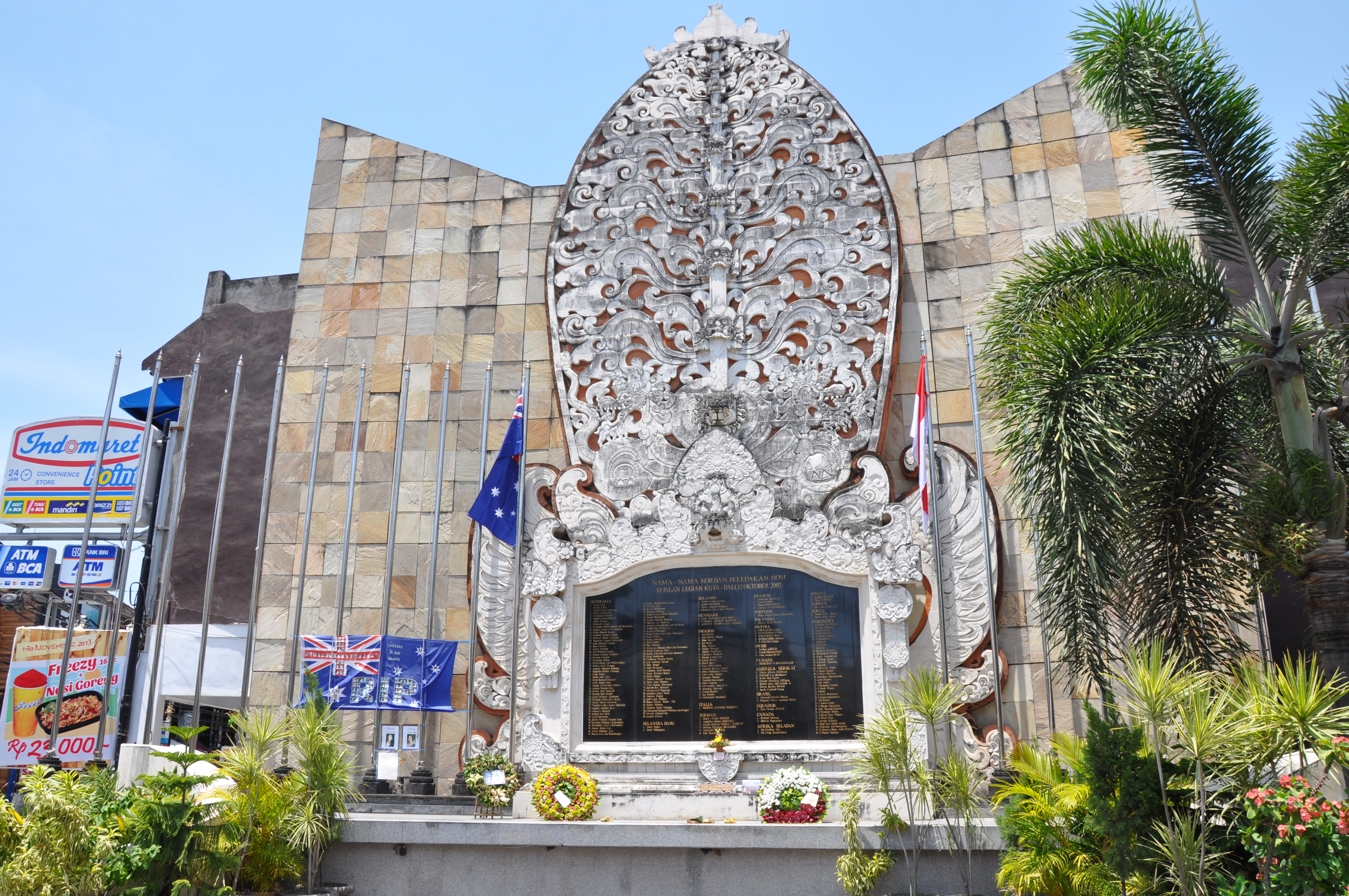
The Bali bombings memorial; the terrorist attacks were a major setback for the Indonesian tourism industry

Although Indonesia had suffered terrorist attacks during the 1980s, the attacks became disturbingly organised in the 2000s. The first major terrorist attack in Indonesia was the 2002 Bali bombing. This was a major setback for Indonesia's tourism industry. A series of travel warnings was issued by several countries. After the attack, the rate of tourism in Bali decreased by 32%.

After the 2002 attack, there were three major terrorist bombings during the following three years: the 2003 Marriott Hotel bombing, the 2004 Australian embassy bombing in Jakarta, and a second bombing in Bali. By 2008, no major terrorist attack had occurred in the country since 2005, so the US government lifted its warning against travel to Indonesia. In 2006, 227,000 Australians visited Indonesia; in 2007, the tourist rate continued to increase with 314,000 tourists entering the country.

By 2016, the terrorist threat had been renewed by reactivated ISIS-affiliated sleeper cells in the region. In 2016, Jakarta suffered a terrorist attack. By 2018, a number of terrorist attacks occurred in Surabaya and Pekanbaru.

=== Policies ===
Most of the major tourist destinations in Indonesia – especially Bali, Yogyakarta, Batam, Bandung and Jakarta – have a relaxed, modern, cosmopolitan social outlook, which benefits the tourism industry. However, some provinces have a different outlook and tend to be conservative. In addition to national laws, some provinces have applied regional autonomous laws – some of them based on Islamic sharia law – such as Aceh province. Caution must be exercised by visitors to Aceh, since the province follows strict Islamic-based law, enforced by Islamic religious police, called the Wilayatul Hisbah in Indonesia.

In more conservative provinces, certain personal behaviours, such as beach clothing (especially bikinis), modesty, parties and alcohol consumption – or a display of affection between a couple – are disapproved of and can lead to legal problems. Care and discretion are required, especially for unmarried couples, as well as lesbian, gay, bisexual, and transgender (LGBT) travelers.

The legal restriction of alcohol, advocated by Islamist parties and organisations in the country, also harms the tourism and service sectors. As a result, the alcohol tax in Indonesia is among the highest in the world, which has caused unusually high prices for alcoholic beverages. This policy is harmful for the bar, club and restaurant industry in Indonesia.

Indonesia's relatively strict policy on nightlife is also unfavorable: local authorities sometimes raid clubs, karaoke rooms and discotheques under the pretext of curbing drugs and substance abuse, which could be inconvenient for visitors. Indonesian government authorities reportedly arrested 32 foreign nationals for failing to show proper identification during a raid on an entertainment hub in Batam (on 23 April 2017). Yudi Kurnain, a member of Batam's Legislative Council, condemned the raid, saying that it might discourage tourism on the island. He added: "They should humanely conduct immigration checks, not through such repressive actions".

Since 2016, anti-LGBT incidents are increasing in the country, including homophobia, hate crimes, raids, criminalization and harassment of LGBT locals and foreigners. The government's failure to curb Islamist attacks on LGBT people could damage the tourism sector and real estate development.

=== Regional conflicts ===
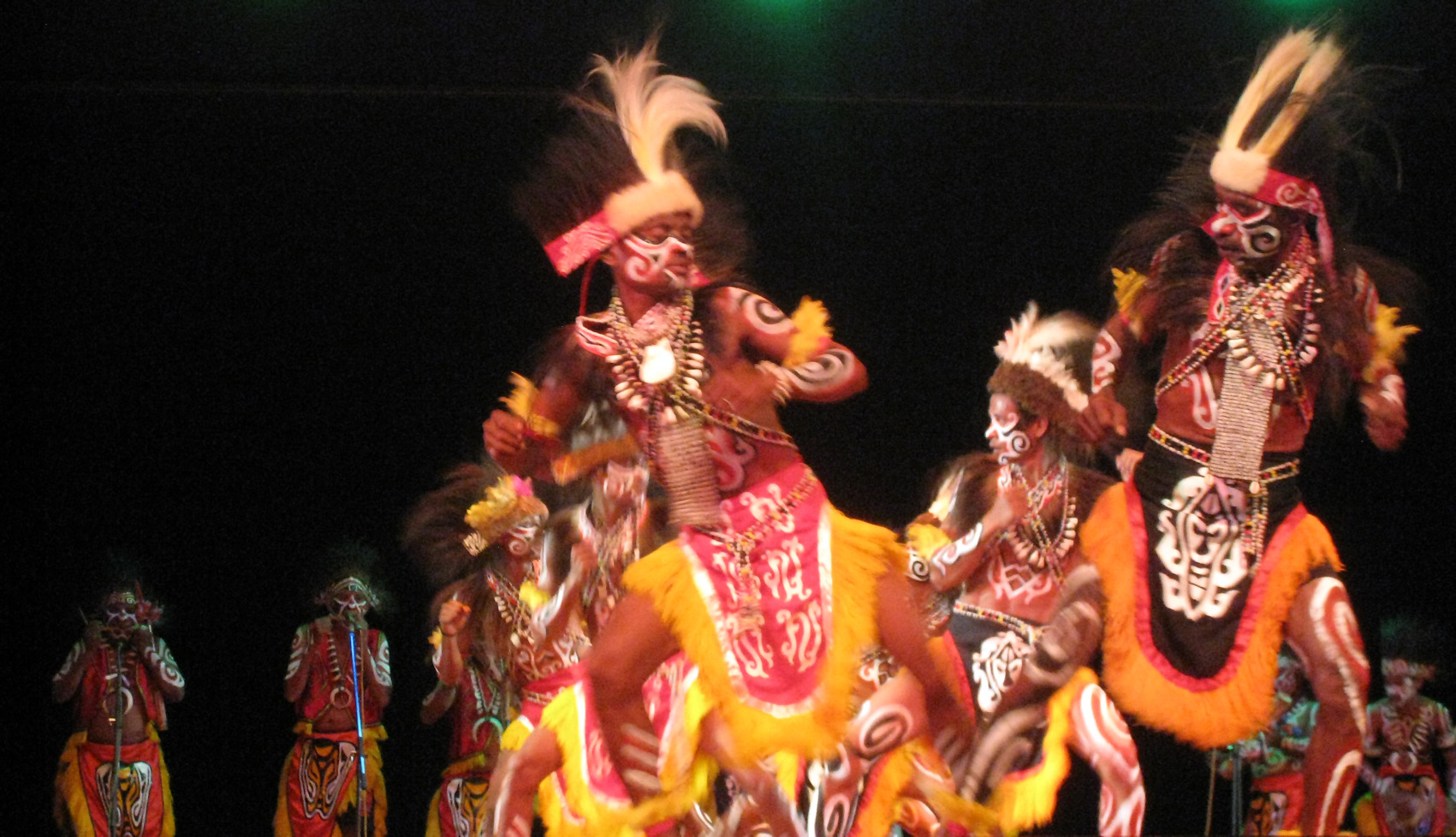
Papuan tribal war dance from Yapen, Papua. The easternmost provinces of Papua and West Papua are still affected by small-scale regional conflict caused by separatist rebellion. (Caution is required for travelers to these provinces.)

A significant threat to Indonesia's tourism industry is sectarian and separatist conflict in some provinces. Decades of separatism-related violence in Aceh ended in 2005, with the signing of a peace agreement between the Indonesian Government and the Free Aceh Movement. As of 2018, Aceh is trying to develop its tourism sector, although the province still has problems related to unconducive policies, such as strict enforcement of sharia law, which may harm tourism development in the province.

The tourism industry in Maluku and Central Sulawesi, which has suffered in recent years from serious sectarian conflicts, is recovering.

Papua, by contrast, is still affected by Papuan separatism, a small-scale regional conflict. The government and military have been accused of a "slow genocide" against native inhabitants, through transmigration from other densely populated Indonesian provinces, which alters the demographic balance in Papua. The government and military have also been accused of suppressing free speech in West Papua, after an expulsion of foreign journalists.

=== Environmental issues ===
In addition, environmental issues pose challenges for the Indonesian tourism sector, especially related to nature conservation, the ocean, forests and national parks. Problems include deforestation; haze hazards caused by slash-and-burn practices that disrupt air transportation and health; and plastic garbage that pollutes marine life.

During the tropical dry season in 2015, Indonesia and its neighbours were affected by the Southeast Asian haze, caused by slash-and-burn practices to clear land in Sumatra and Kalimantan (Indonesian Borneo). Riau suffered the worst, as the haze disrupted air transportation and endangered health.

In March 2018, a diver showed video footage of a popular diving site that was polluted by floating plastic garbage in Manta Point, Nusa Penida, around 20 kilometres off the coast of Bali. Bali lies in the middle of the Indonesian throughflow, a current that flows from the Pacific Ocean into the Indian Ocean via the straits of the Indonesian archipelago. This flow implies that plastic waste could be either local or carried from as far away as the Pacific Ocean – from within Indonesia; from neighbouring Malaysia and the Philippines; or from distant Asia-Pacific regions.

=== Health issues ===
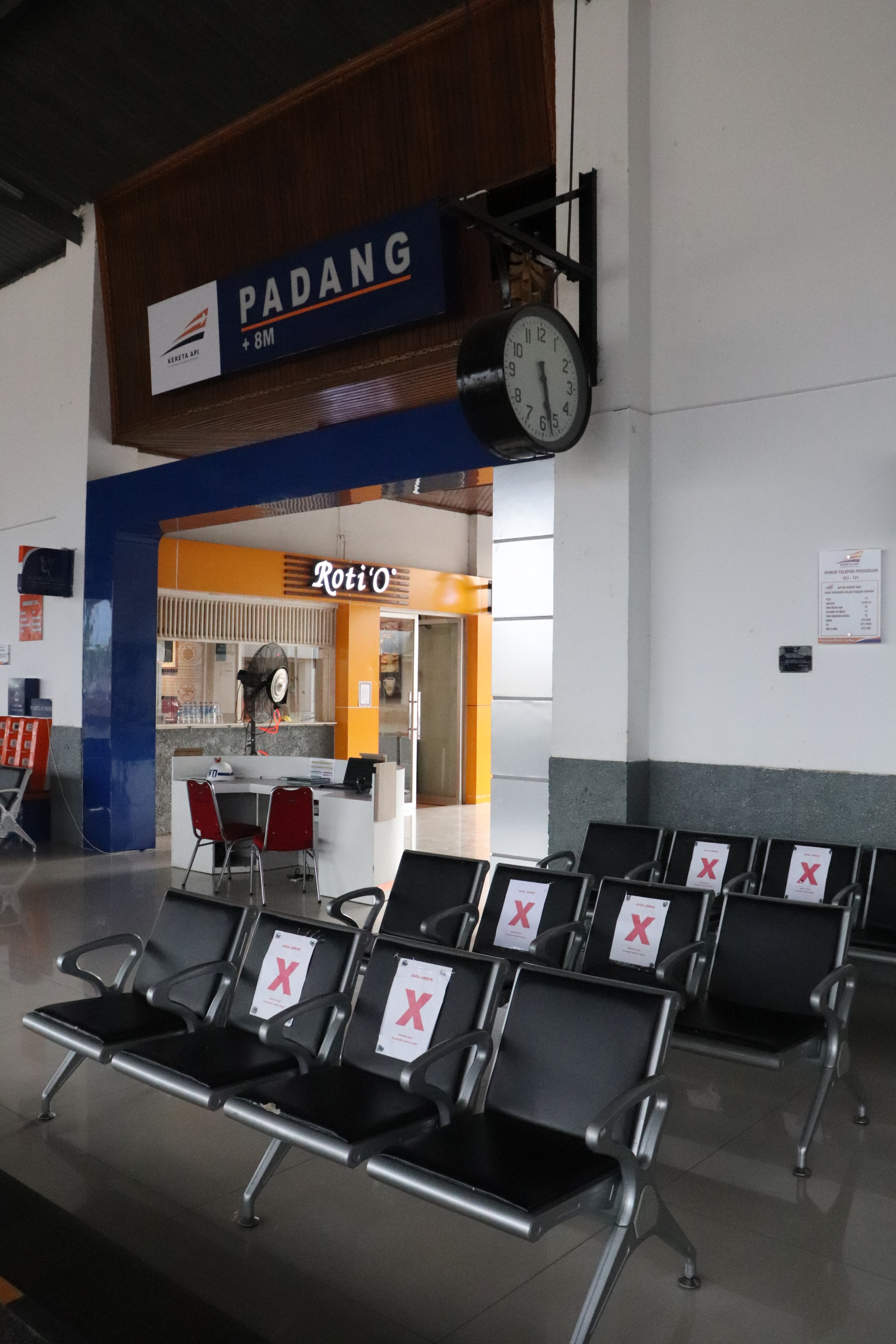
Empty seats at Padang Station during the COVID-19 pandemic in April 2020. The Indonesian travel and tourism industry was severely affected during this coronavirus outbreak.

Because of the COVID-19 pandemic, Indonesia closed its borders to all travelers from China. This closure impacted Indonesian tourism because Chinese travelers are the second-largest group of foreign visitors to Indonesia. The Indonesian government planned to spend $477 million in the form of tax cuts, discounts, and other measures to reduce the downturn in the tourism sector. Foreign tourist arrivals fell sharply in April 2020 compared to April 2019 at three of Indonesia's 26 main entry points: arrivals at Ngurah Rai decreased by 99.94%; at Soekarno-Hatta, by 99.79%; and at Batam, by 99.27%. In March 2020, the Indonesian government suspended several policies for one month: Visa Free Arrival (BVK), Visa on Arrival, and the Diplomatic / Free Service Visa.

== Guidebooks ==
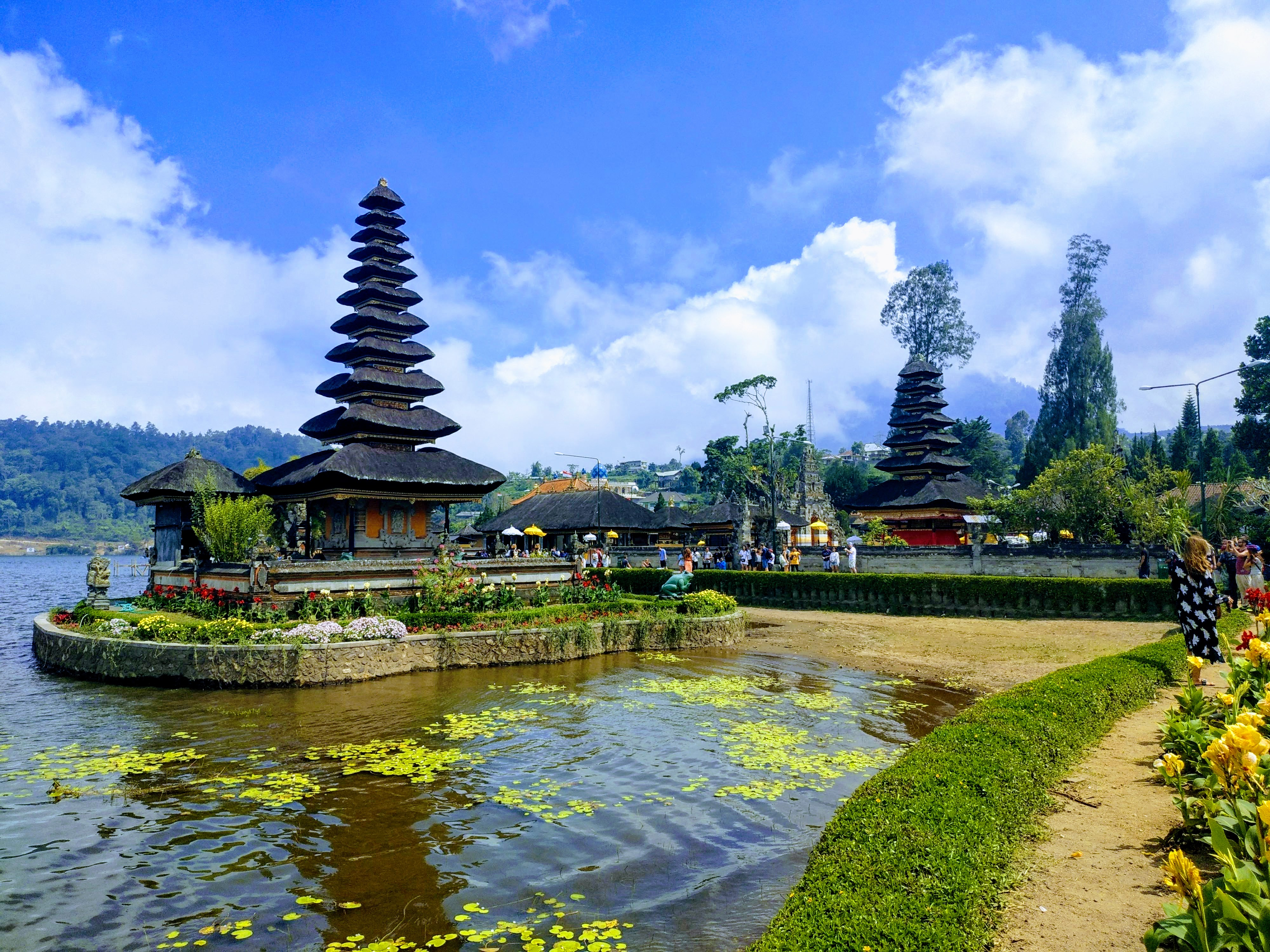
Beratan Lake and Temple in Bali, a scene often used to promote Indonesian tourism

Guidebooks and travel accounts with details of Indonesia and its people have a long history; some books from the 19th century and early 20th century are classics describing places that were viewed as "things to see". Both private and government publications – such as the 1920s Come to Java books produced in Batavia by the government tourist bureau – have appeared every decade since then.

Tourism was restricted during World War II and the mid-to-late 1960s; outside those two periods, travel accounts and guidebooks have been produced regularly. James Rush's and Adrian Vickers' texts introduce the range of travel writing that has been created about Indonesia.

The most popular English-language guidebook on Indonesia from the 1970s to the 1990s was Bill Dalton's Indonesia Handbook; from the 1990s onward, Lonely Planet's Indonesia was in its tenth edition as of 2010. Many other guidebooks have been produced in English and other languages.

International newspapers regularly publish travel features and stories about Indonesia. Indonesia's travel journalists joined the Indonesian Tourism Journalist Association (ITJA), and they actively create tourist information about unique aspects of the country.

== Gallery ==
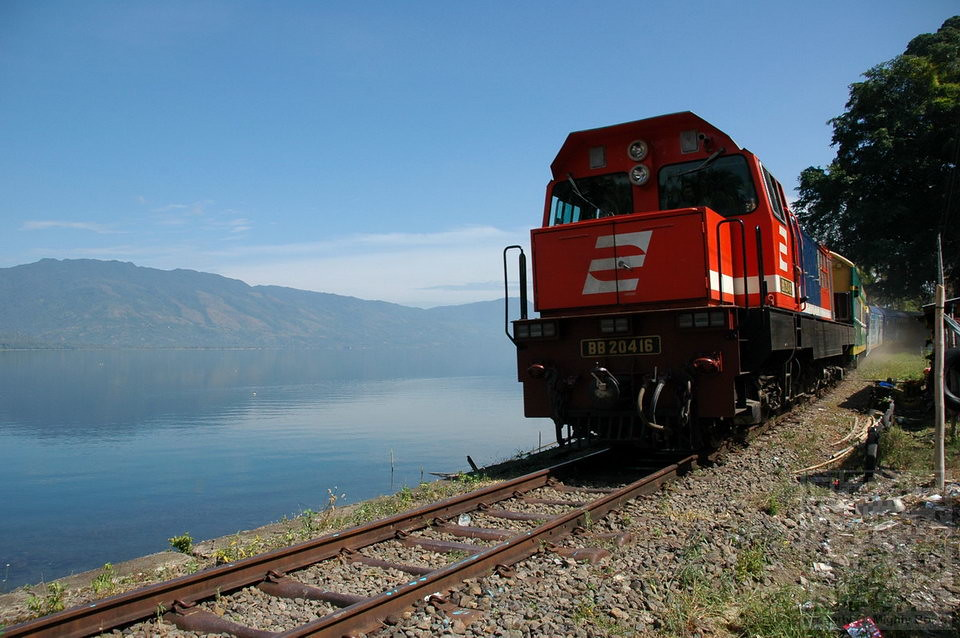
Lake Singkarak, West Sumatera

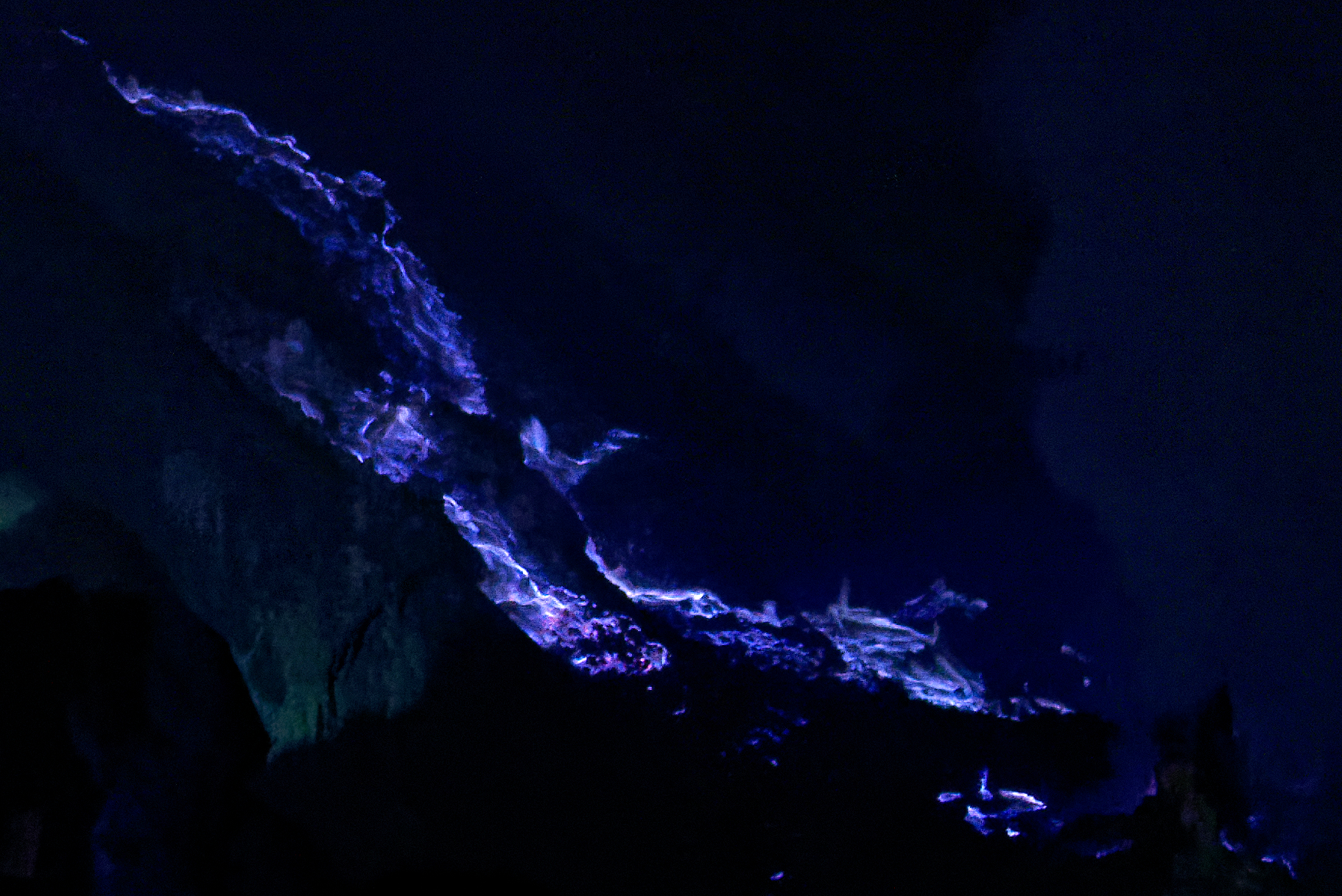
Blue lava of Ijen crater, East Java

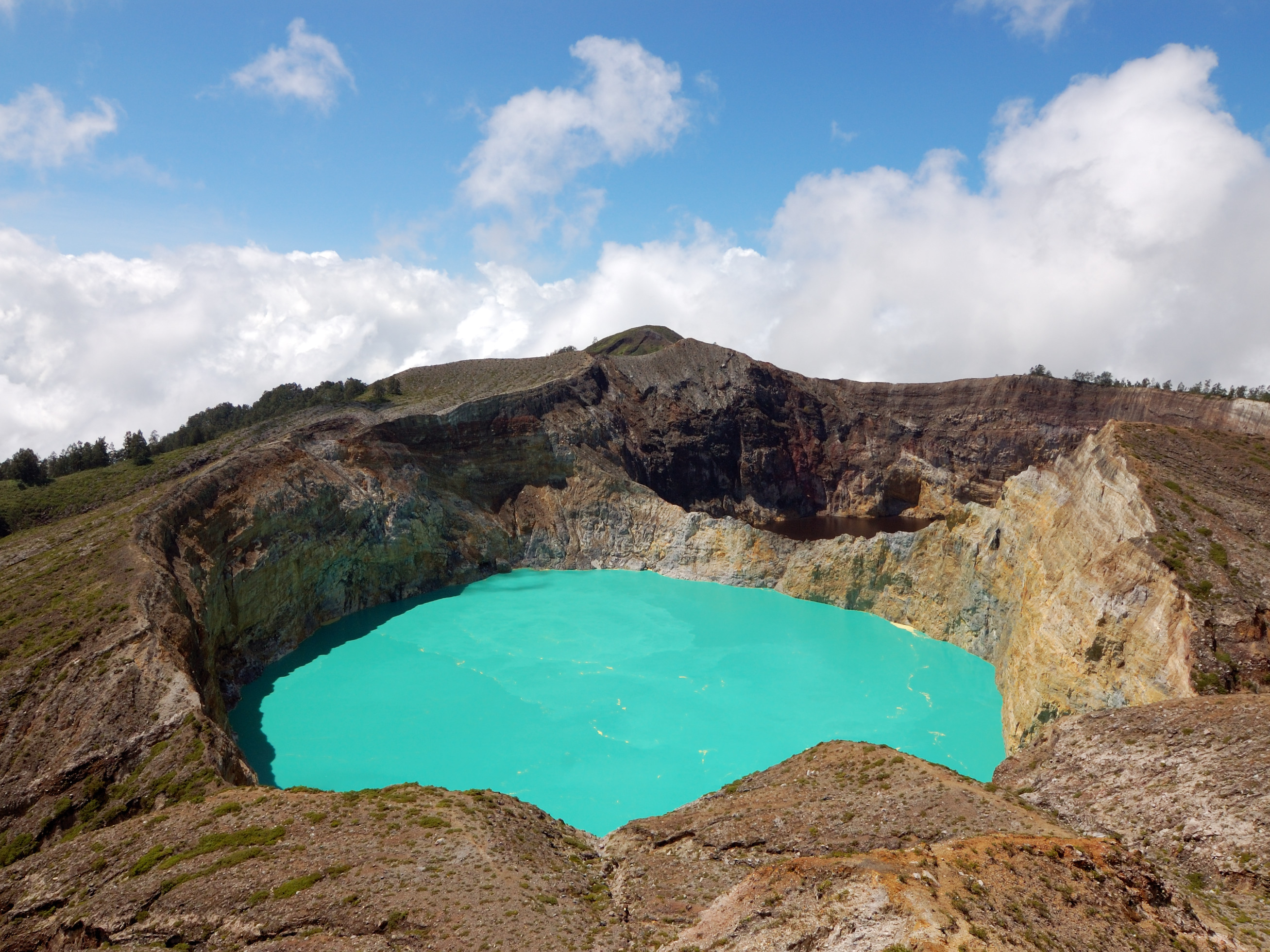
Mount Kelimutu crater lakes, East Nusa Tenggara

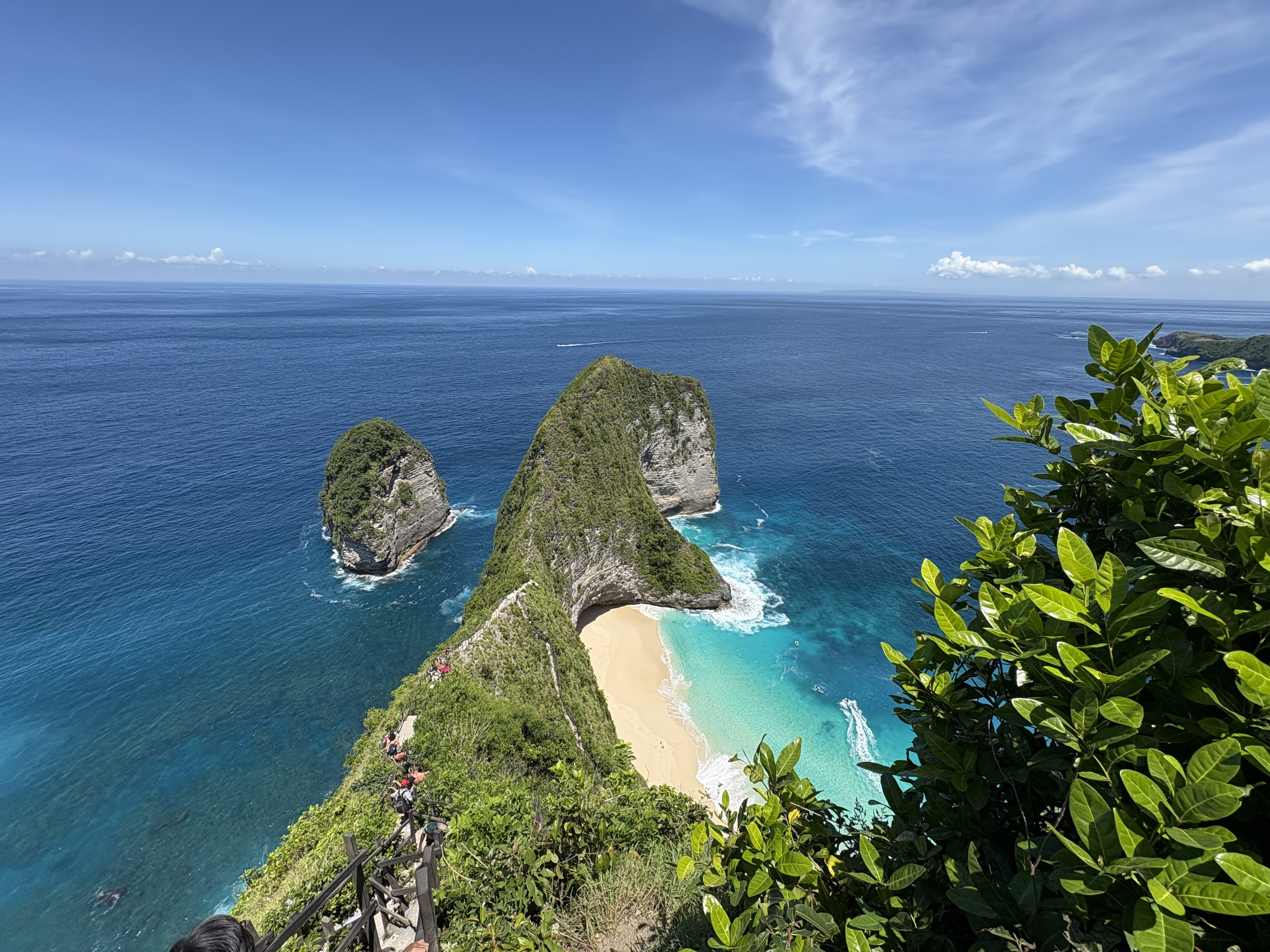
Nusa Penida, Bali

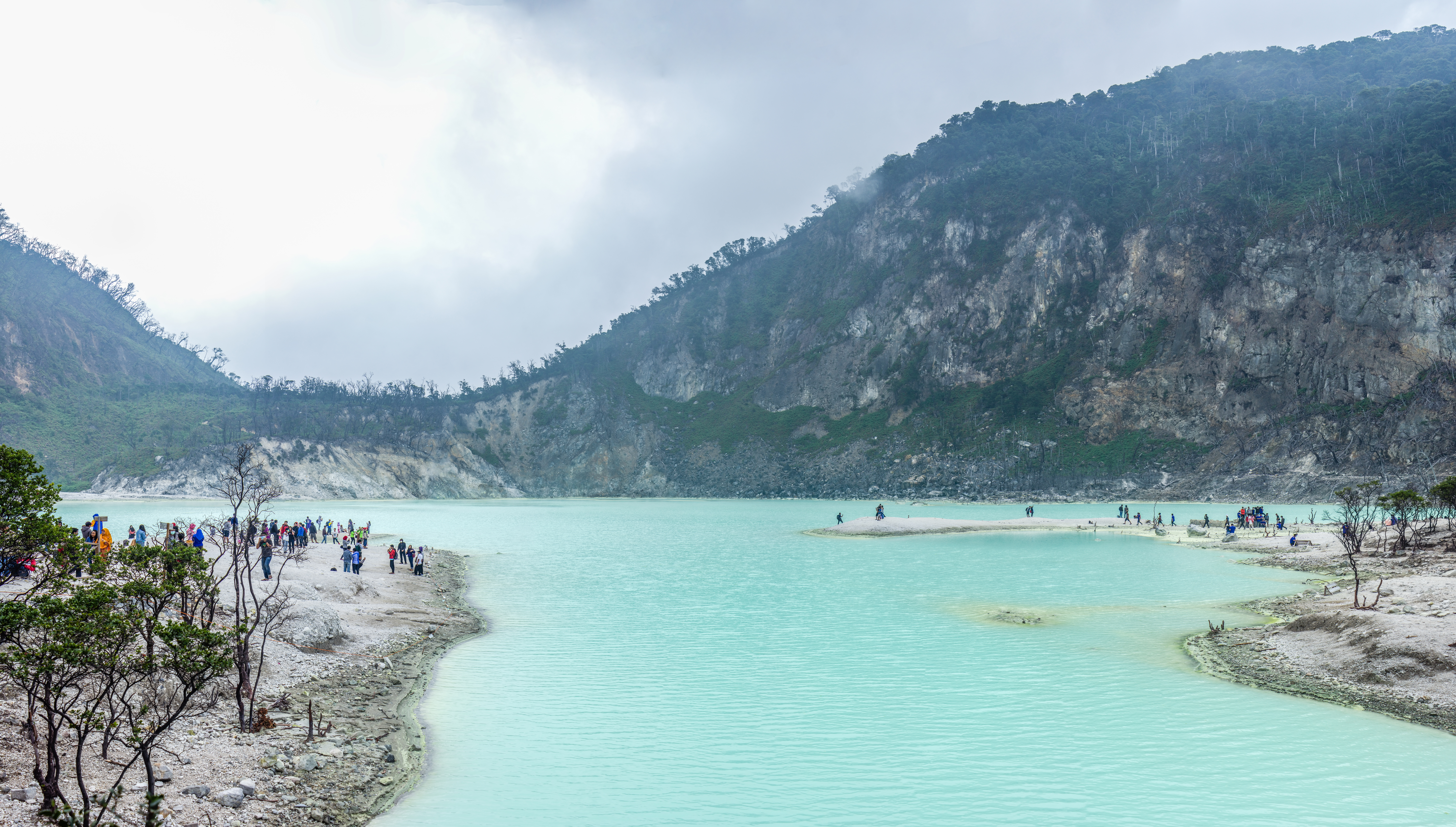
Kawah Putih, West Java

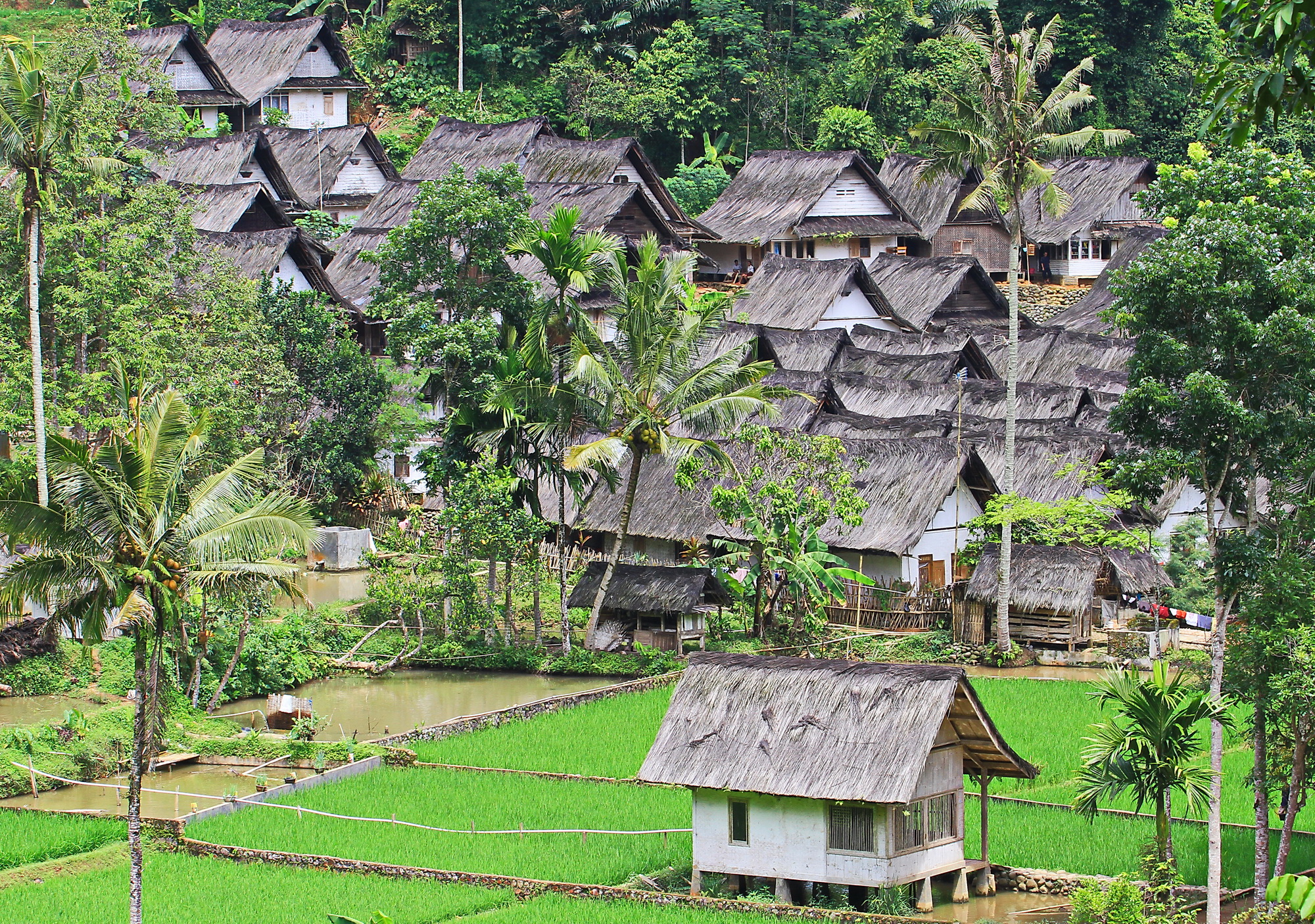
Kampung Naga, West Java

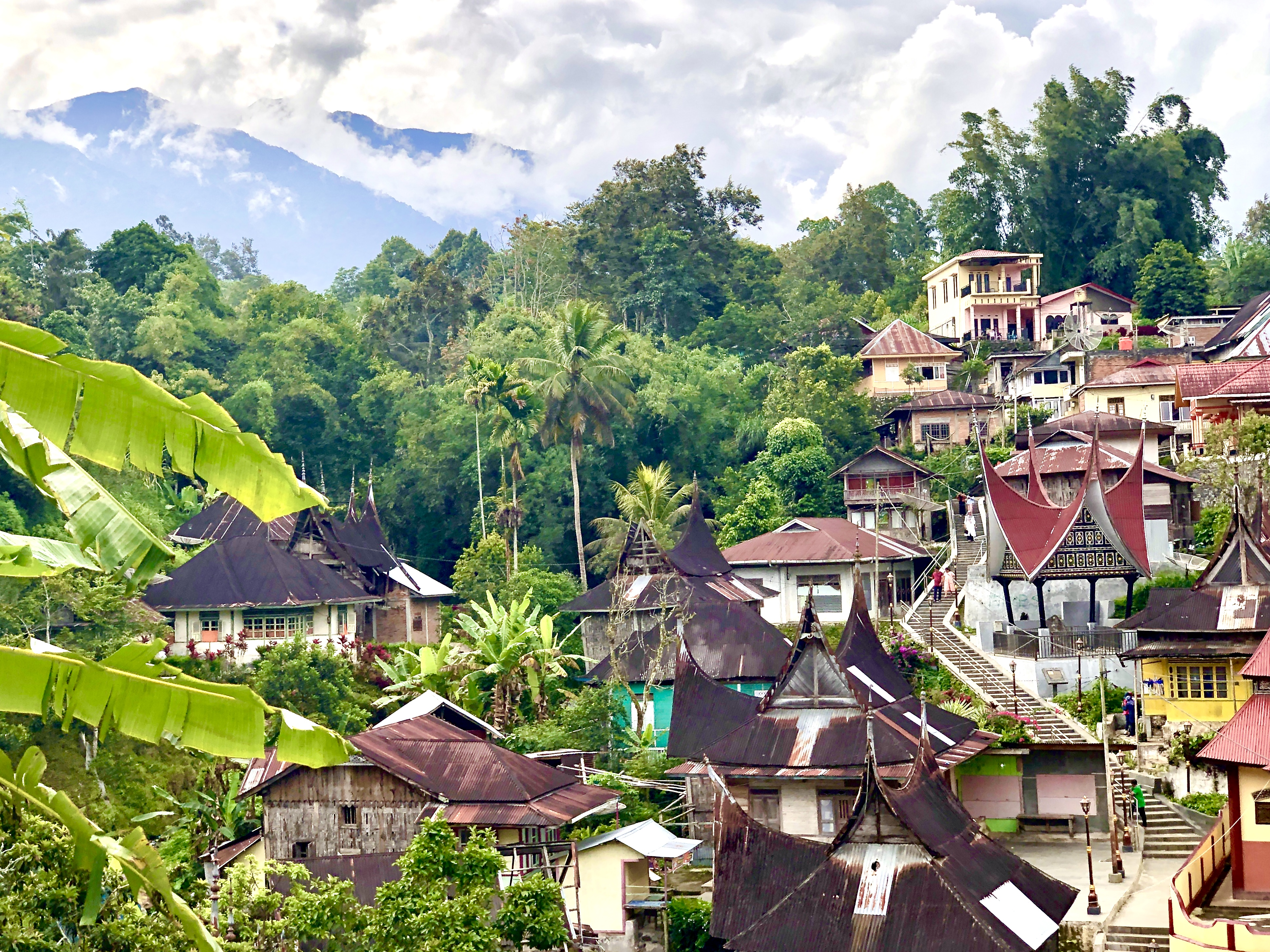
Pariangan Village, West Sumatra

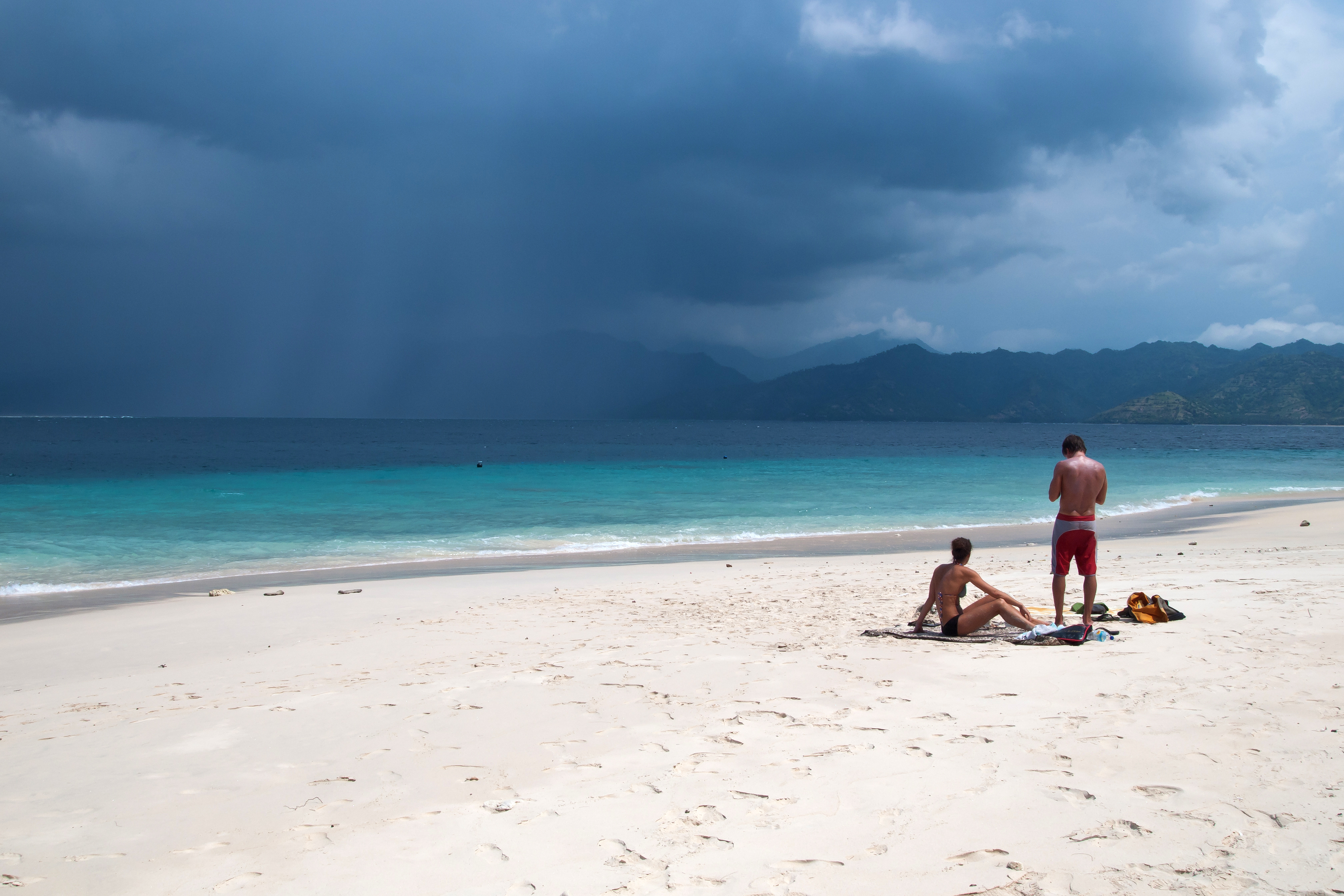
The beach at Gili Meno with Lombok in the far background

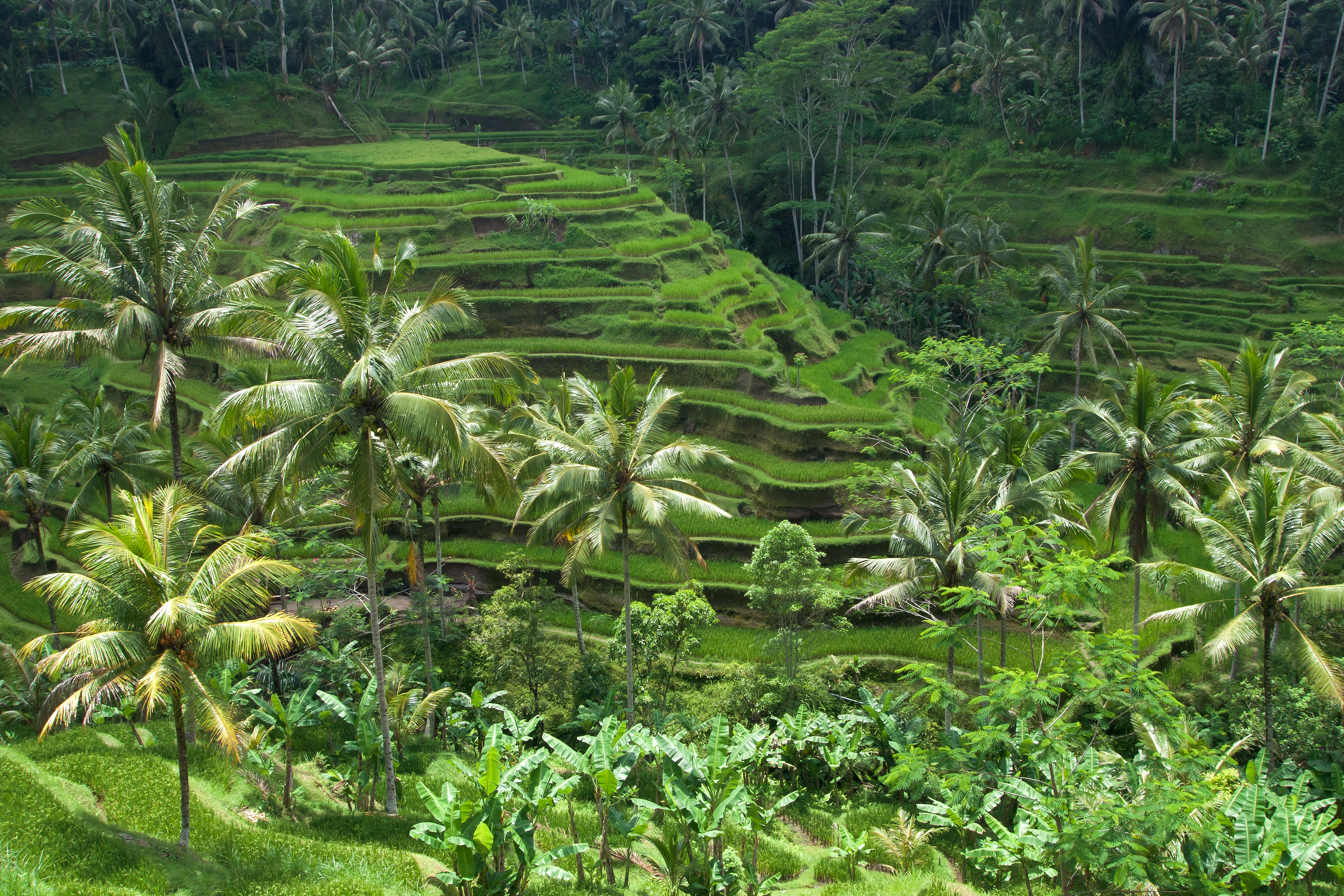
Rice terraces in Bali

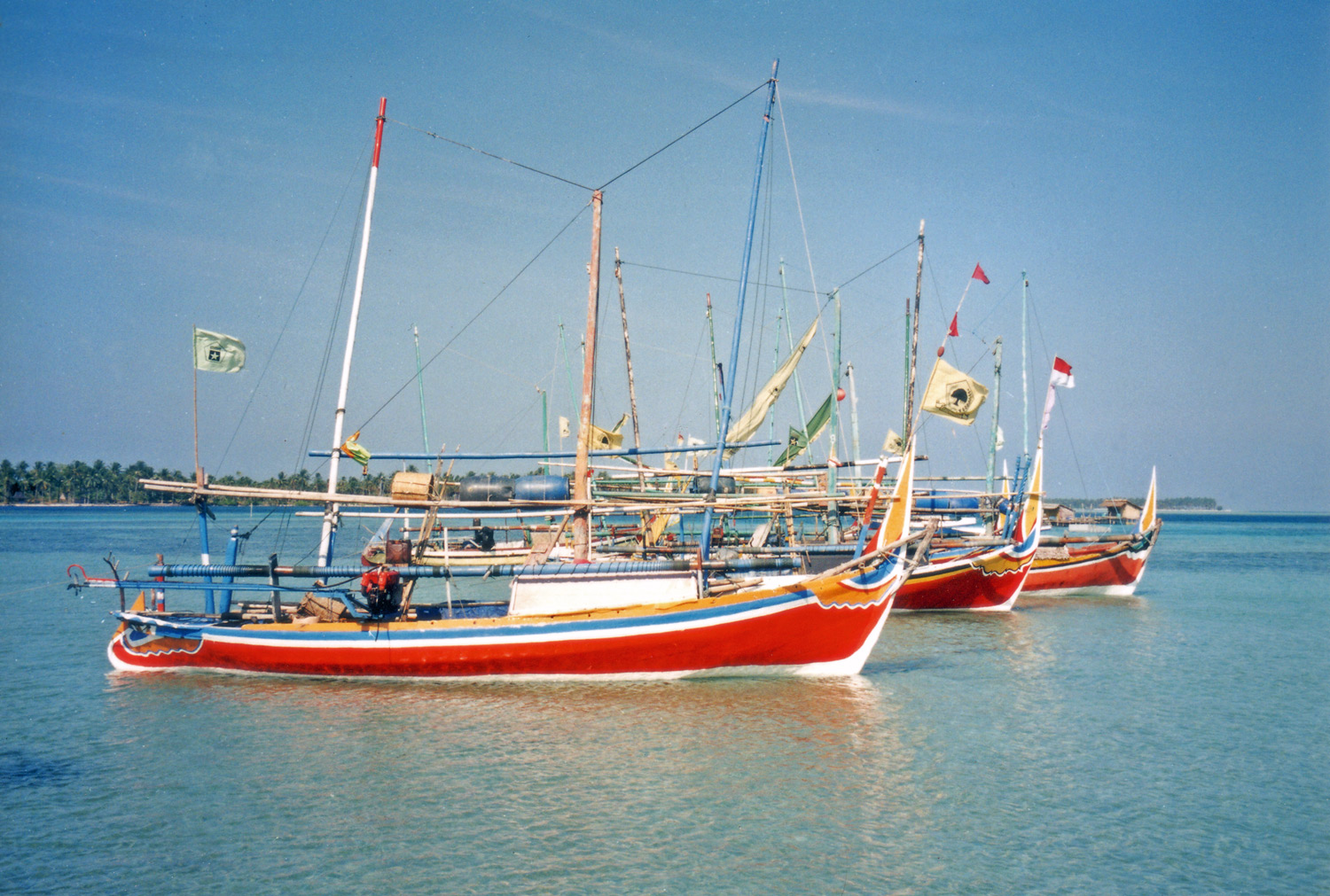
Fishing boats in the main harbour of Karimunjawa

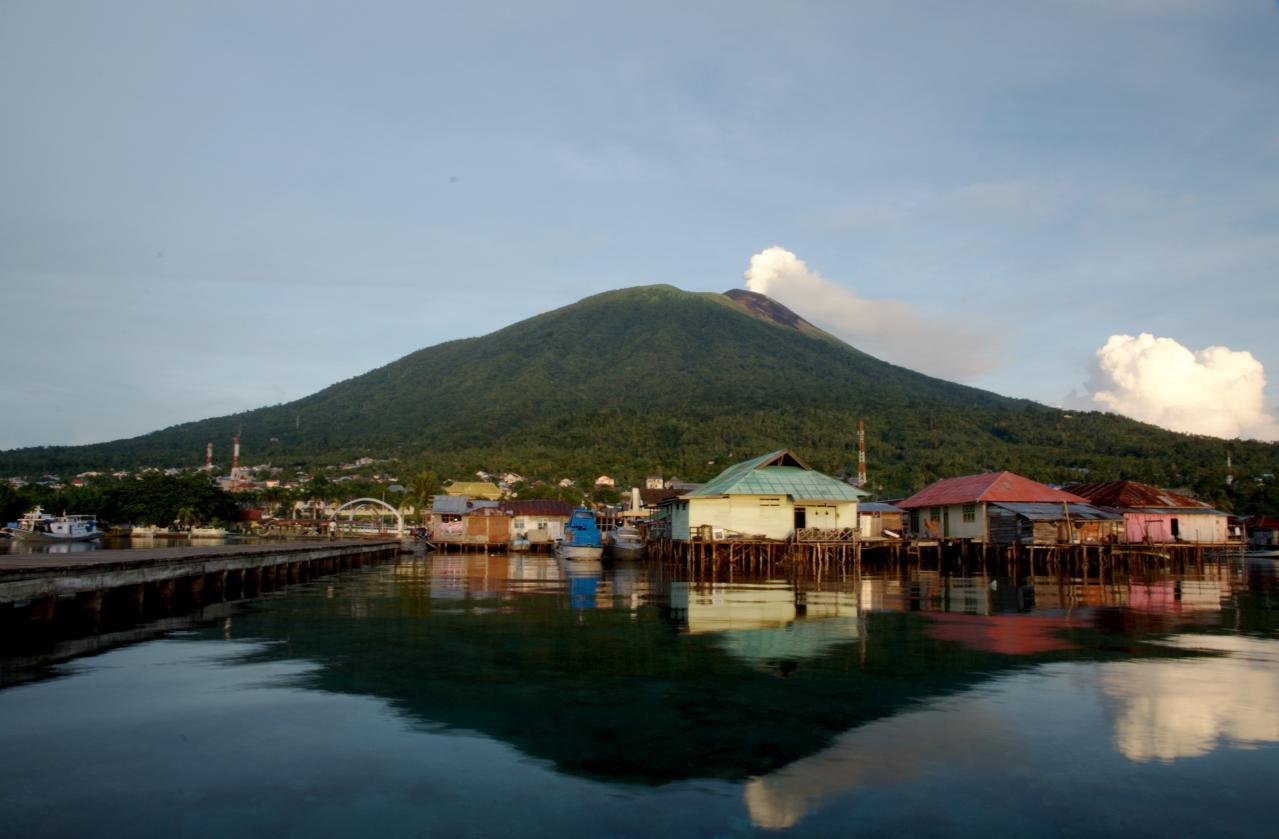
Ternate, North Maluku

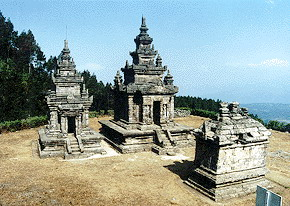
Gedong Songo Temples, Ungaran, Central Java

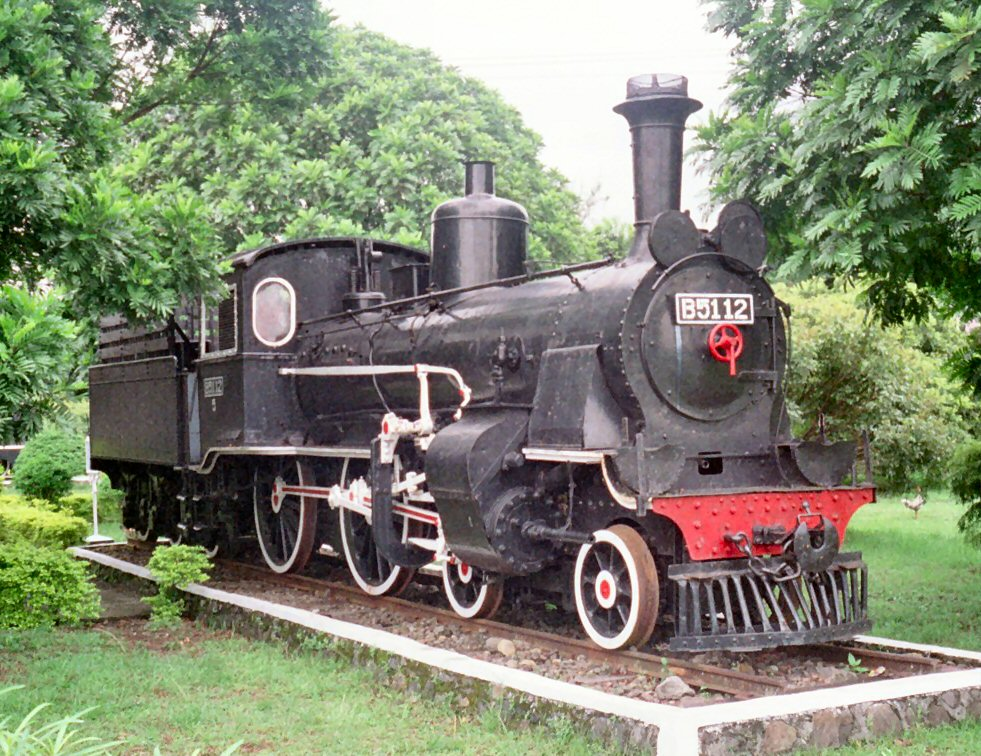
Ambarawa Railway Museum, Central Java

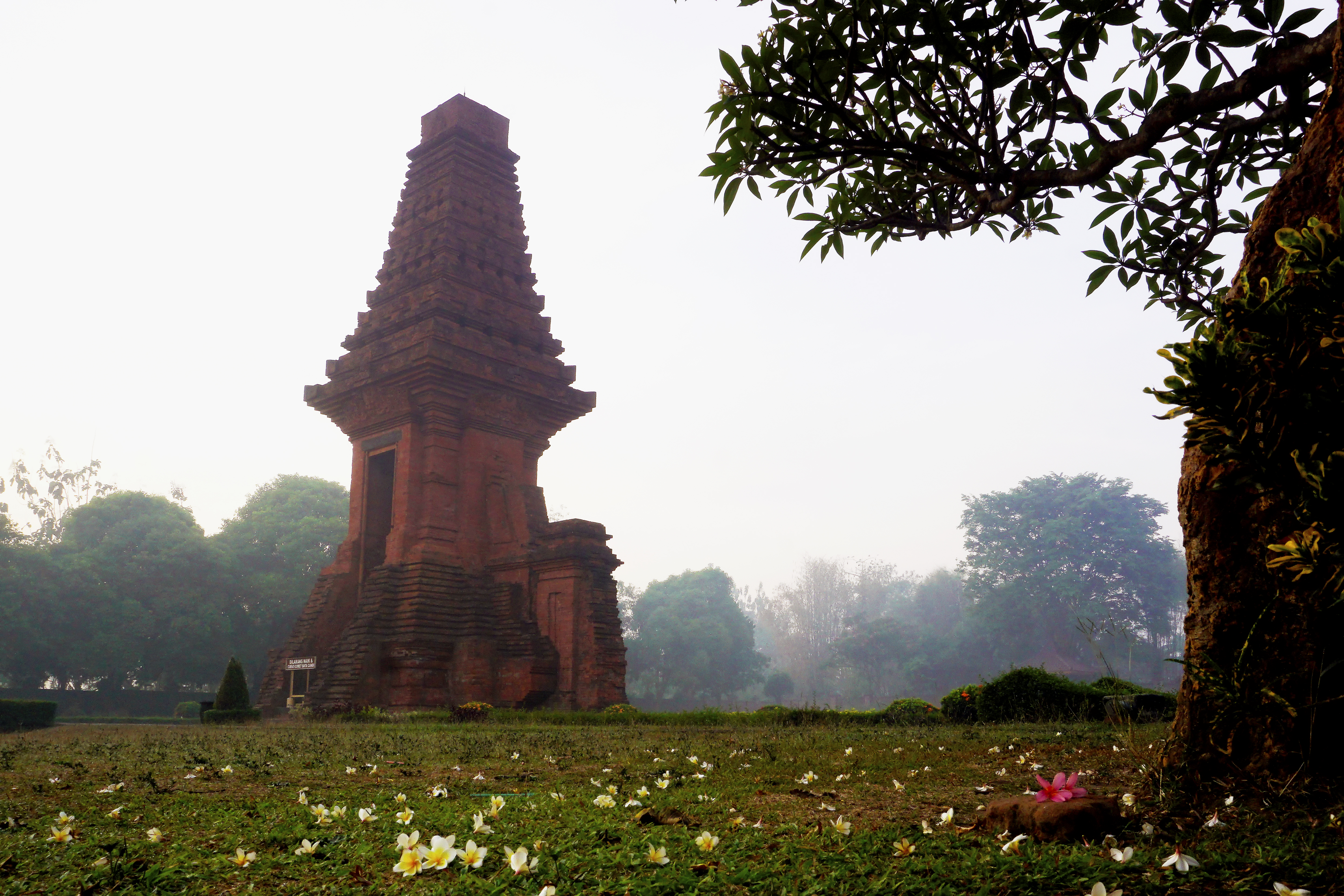
Trowulan archaeological site, East Java

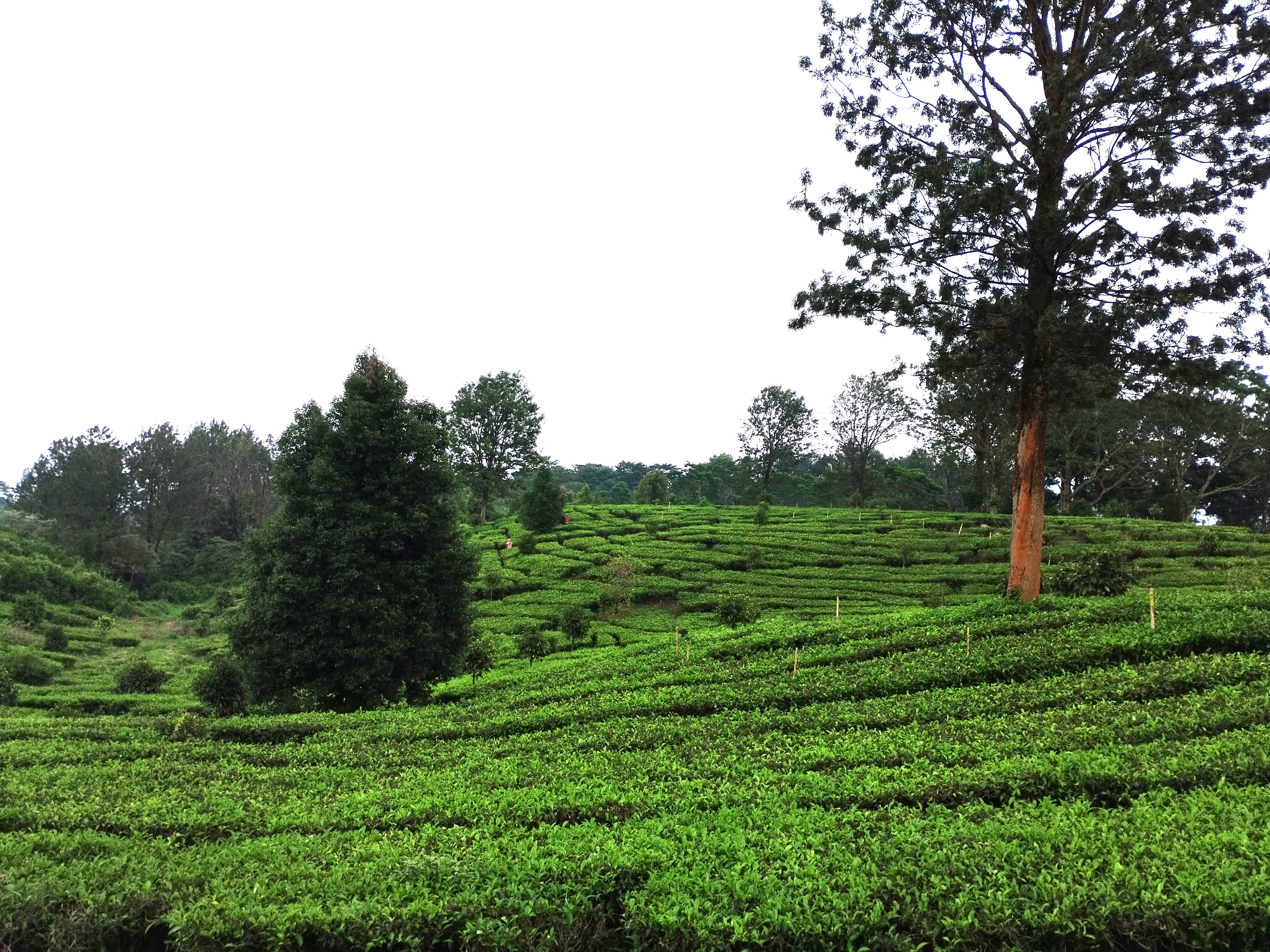
Puncak in West Java

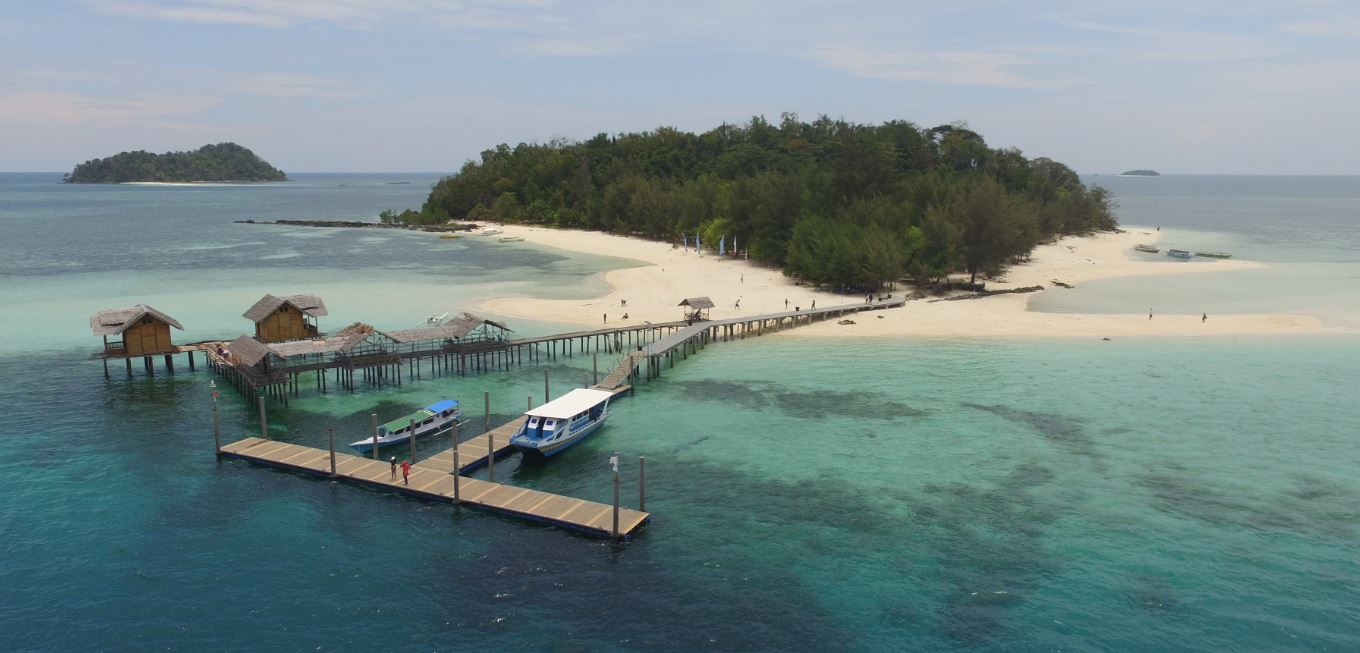
Saronde Island, Gorontalo

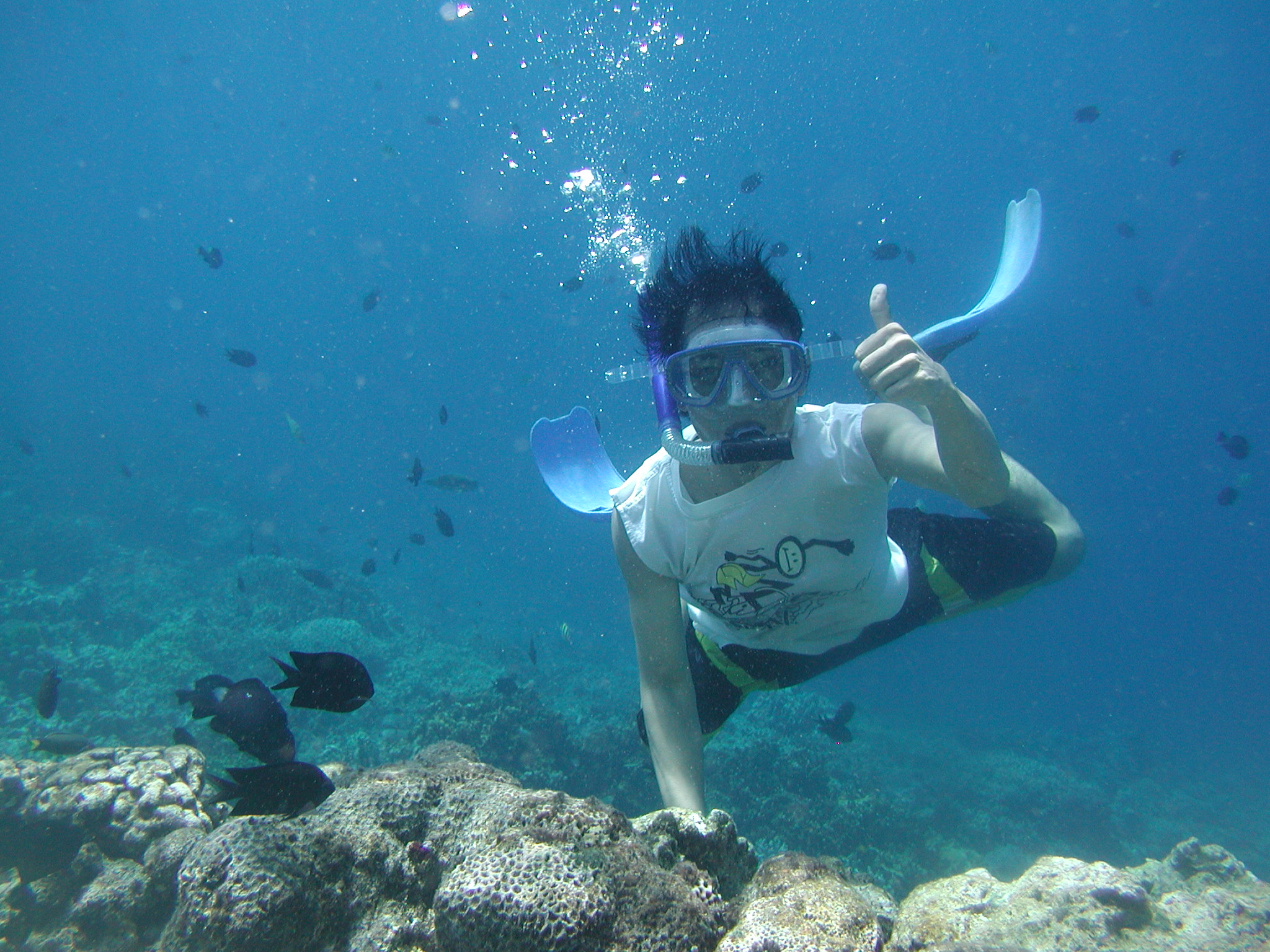
Bunaken National Park, North Sulawesi

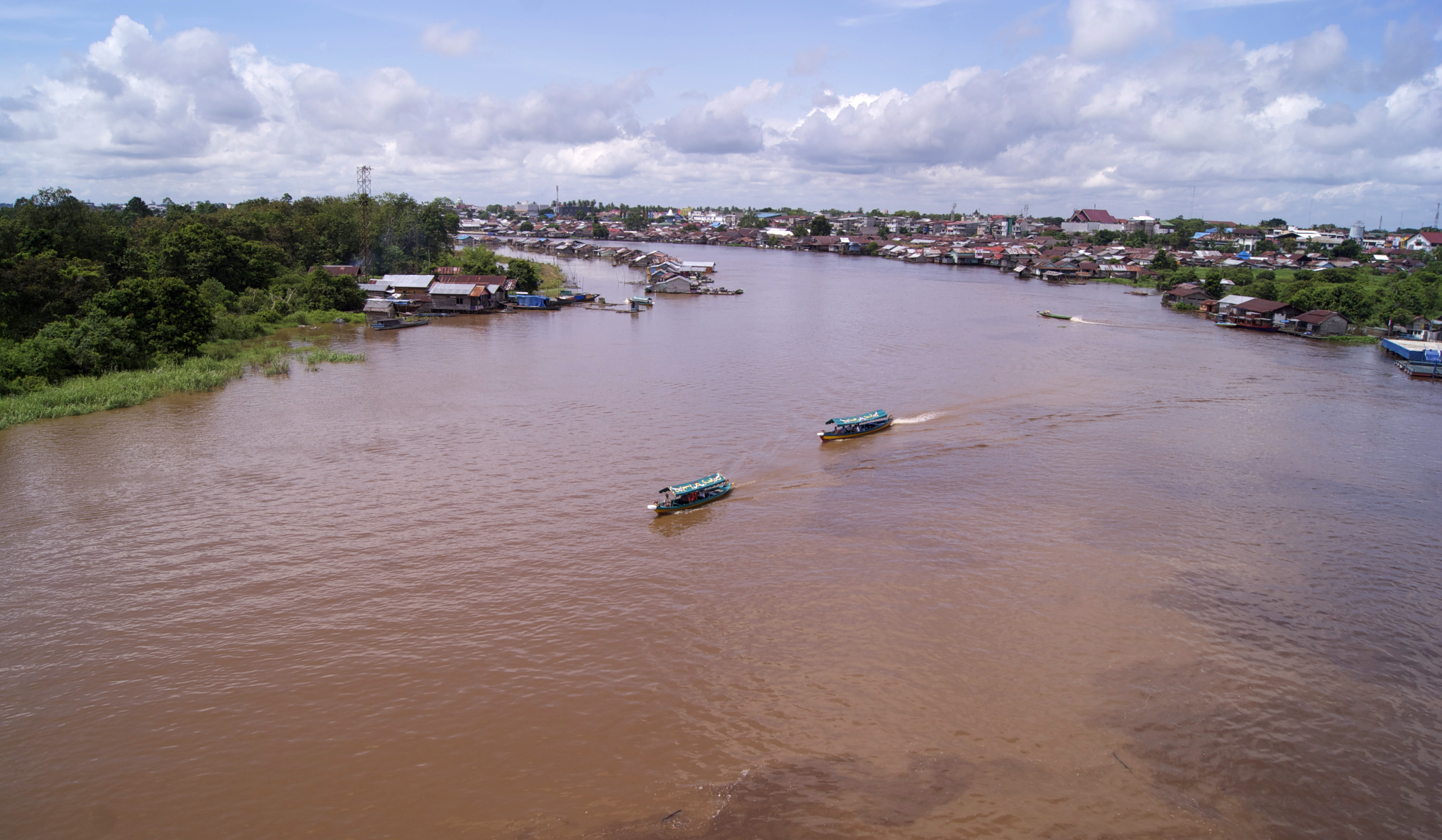
Kahayan River, Central Kalimantan

== See also ==
- Alcohol in Indonesia
- Transport in Indonesia
- Visa policy of Indonesia
- Category:World Heritage Sites in Indonesia
