= Desa Bubuk =

Bubuk Desa Bubuk
- Village
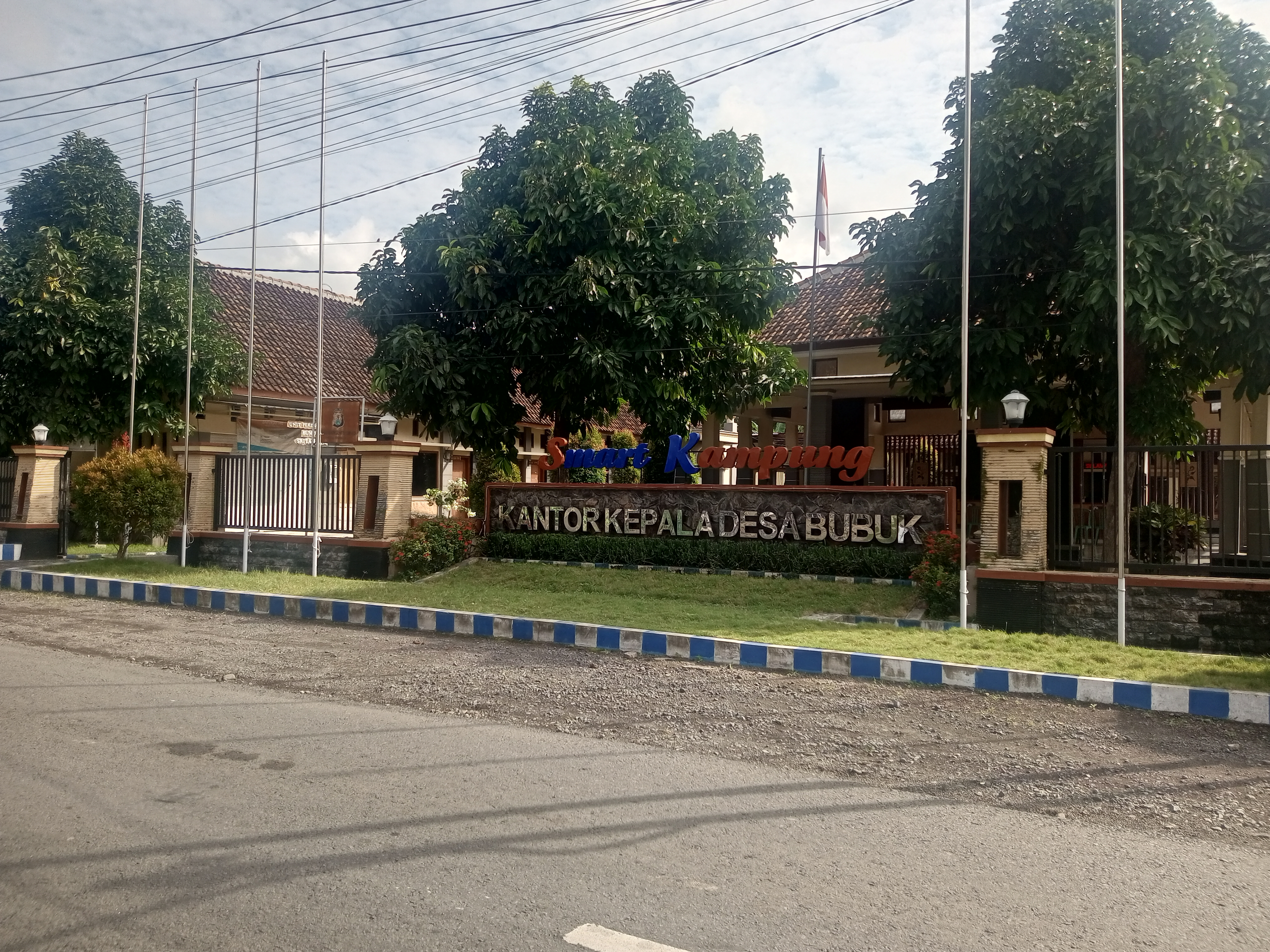

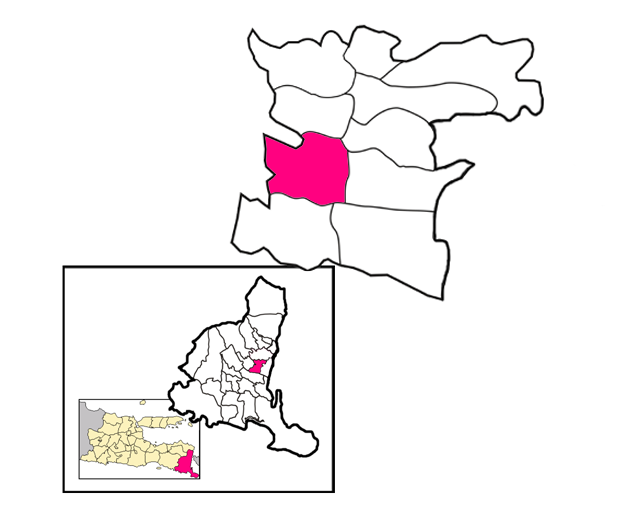
- Coordinates: 8°19′58.905″S 114°16′47.942″E
- Country: Indonesia
- Province: East Java
- Regency: Banyuwangi
- District: Rogojampi

Area
  - Total: 12.9 km^{2} (5.0 sq mi)
- Time zone: Time in Indonesia (UTC+07:00)
- Zip Code: 68462
- Website: Situs resmi Pemerintah Kabupaten Banyuwangi Archived 2009-02-22 at the Wayback Machine

Bubuk is a village Located in the District Rogojampi, Banyuwangi Regency, East Java Province, Indonesia. Most of the Village area is lowland. Bubuk is the border area between Rogojampi District and Singojuruh District. It is bordered by Gladag from the east, Desa Benelan Kidul from the west, Desa Kedaleman from the north, and Desa Aliyah from the north.

== Hamlet ==
Desa Bubuk is divided into 3 hamlets and 1 Dukuh, namely:

- Bubuk Krajan Hamlet
- Banje Hamlet
- Warengan Hamlet
- Dukuh Sukosari or Gelundengan

== History ==
This Village used to be a village where almost all of its residents worked as farmers. All the villagers were very prosperous with fertile rice fields. At that time the village was experiencing a bumper harvest with abundant agricultural produce. The villagers seemed to forget the Creator because of this abundant harvest. A pest and disease then attacked the residents' agricultural crops in the following season. The pest was in the form of a fine powder like flour which immediately attacked and damaged the rice that was ready to be harvested. There was a massive crop failure which then threatened the lives of the local people due to starvation. The following season a local community leader, Buyut Kopek, named this village Bubuk, as a form of gratitude and asking for forgiveness from "Dewi Sri" (Goddess of Fertility) for reminding the community about the arrival of the pest and giving them an abundant harvest. The name Bubuk again reminds us of the incident where various agricultural crops were attacked by the powder pest.

== Geography ==
A river divides the village that borders the Bubuk Krajan Hamlet with the Warengan and Banje Hamlets. Several Gumuk are also scattered in the Village. One of the famous ones is Gumuk Kopek which is located on the border between Bubuk Krajan Hamlet and Warengan Hamlet. The name of this gumuk is also taken from one of the village elders in the past, namely Buyut Kopek.

=== Access ===
Desa Bubuk can be accessed from Banyuwangi (town) City by exiting the South Coast Route. From the Adipura Rogojampi intersection, you can take the straight route or go through the Route to Jember Regency. From the east route, you can go through Gladag, then from the Gladag intersection, turn west, or from the west route, you can go through the Route to Jember, then from the Benelan Kidul intersection right in front of the TVRI Commercial Television Station, you can turn east.

== Demographics ==
Majority of the Bubuk resident are Ethnic Osing that lived in the village generation by generation.

=== Religions ===
Sunni Islam are the majority religion amongst the residents, and between the border of Banje and Warengan there's a Hindu Temple and a minority Hindus Community lived side by side with the muslims in Banje
