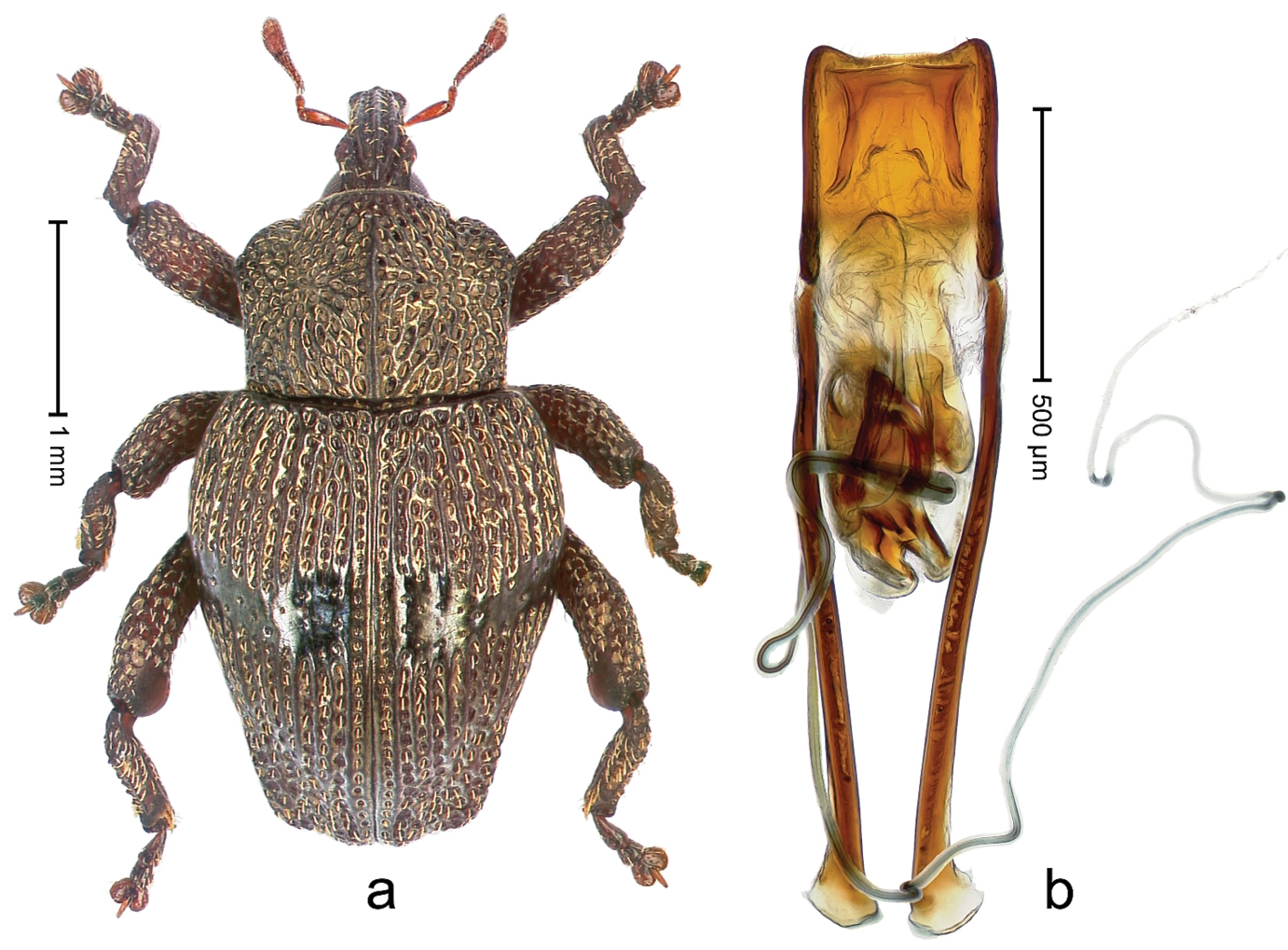

Scientific classification
- Kingdom: Animalia
- Phylum: Arthropoda
- Clade: Pancrustacea
- Class: Insecta
- Order: Coleoptera
- Suborder: Polyphaga
- Infraorder: Cucujiformia
- Family: Curculionidae
- Genus: Trigonopterus
- Species: T. alaspurwensis

Binomial name
- Trigonopterus alaspurwensis Riedel, 2014

= Trigonopterus alaspurwensis =

Species of beetle

Trigonopterus alaspurwensis is a species of flightless weevil in the genus Trigonopterus from Indonesia. The species was described in 2014. The beetle is 2.97–3.47 mm long. It has a reddish-brown head and legs, while the rest of the body is black with a coppery-greenish sheen. It is endemic to the Indonesian province of East Java, where it is known only from Alas Purwo National Park.

== Taxonomy ==
Trigonopterus alaspurwensis was described by the entomologist Alexander Riedel in 2014 on the basis of an adult male specimen collected from Alas Purwo National Park on the island of Java in Indonesia. The species is named after the national park in which it was discovered.

== Description ==
The beetle is 2.97–3.47 mm long. It has a reddish-brown head and legs, while the rest of the body is black with a coppery-greenish sheen. A polished black transverse band crosses the elytra. The body is elongated, with a pronounced narrowing between the pronotum and elytra when viewed from above, and it appears flat in profile. The rostrum features a central ridge and two submedian ridges, with the grooves between them lined with punctures and semi-erect, piliform scales. The epistome is simple.

The pronotum projects noticeably along the sides of the front of the body, is rounded, and narrows near the apex. Its surface is densely punctured, with some punctures elongated or arranged in rhombus-like patterns near the center. Each puncture contains a white piliform scale, and a smooth central ridge runs down the middle. The elytral intervals each have a row of coarse punctures flanked by smooth ridges.

The striae are difficult to distinguish from secondary puncture rows. The punctures contain long, flat, cream-colored scales. A mostly smooth transverse band is present near the middle. Interval 7 is swollen near the tip, forming a lateral edge. The elytral tip is nearly straight and the sutural interval does not protrude. The femora are edentate and the underside ridge is indistinct. The hind femur has a stridulatory patch near the tip. The upper edge of the tibiae has a sharp tooth formed by an angled projection near the base. The fifth abdominal segment has a shallow central pit and is covered with long, semi-upright scales at the base and sides.

In males, the penis is short with nearly parallel sides and a broadly rounded tip. It contains a complex transfer apparatus that is rotated to the left. The apodemes are three times the length of the penis. The ductus ejaculatorius lacks a bulb.

Females are more slender than males. Their rostrum has smooth central and submedian ridges. The female elytra are widest near the middle and have a more convex outline, while male elytra are widest between the humeri. The female elytral sculpture is less distinct, with weak or absent longitudinal ridges, a faint transverse band near the middle, and sparse punctures. The fifth abdominal segment in females is flat.

== Distribution ==
Trigonopterus alaspurwensis is endemic to the Indonesian province of East Java, where it is known only from Alas Purwo National Park. It has been recorded from an elevation of 25 m (82 ft).
