= Pecel ayam =

Indonesian chicken rice dish

- Place of origin: Indonesia
- Region or state: Banyuwangi, East Java

Pecel ayam (Javanese: pecel pitik) is a traditional chicken dish of the Kemiren Banyuwangi Osing tribe of East Java, Indonesia.

== Ingredients ==
Pecel ayam is made with chicken and coconut sauce cooked in salted tamarind water. The sauce requires grain coconut, garlic, onions, peanuts, cutchery, kaffir lime leaves, fried nutmeg, a sachet of shrimp paste and optionally for added spice, cayenne or chili. Basil leaf and lime juice may also be added. Sugar, salt, and MSG are also added.

== Method ==
The ingredients for pecel ayam must be prepared beforehand. The chicken is rubbed in tamarind water, salt, and spices, and baked until cooked and browned. Then, the chicken is drained and shred. After that, the grated coconut is cooked. Added spices include fried nutmeg, salt, chili, and peanuts that have been roasted. The seasoning is mixed with chicken that has been cut in several pieces. Optionally, lime juice is added. Finally, pecel ayam is ready to serve.

== See also ==
- Cuisine of Indonesia
- Javanese cuisine
- Nasi pecel
- Pecel
- Pecel lele
