= Osing people =

Ethnic group in Indonesia

Osing
ꦭꦫꦺꦈꦱꦶꦁ Lare Using Lare Osing
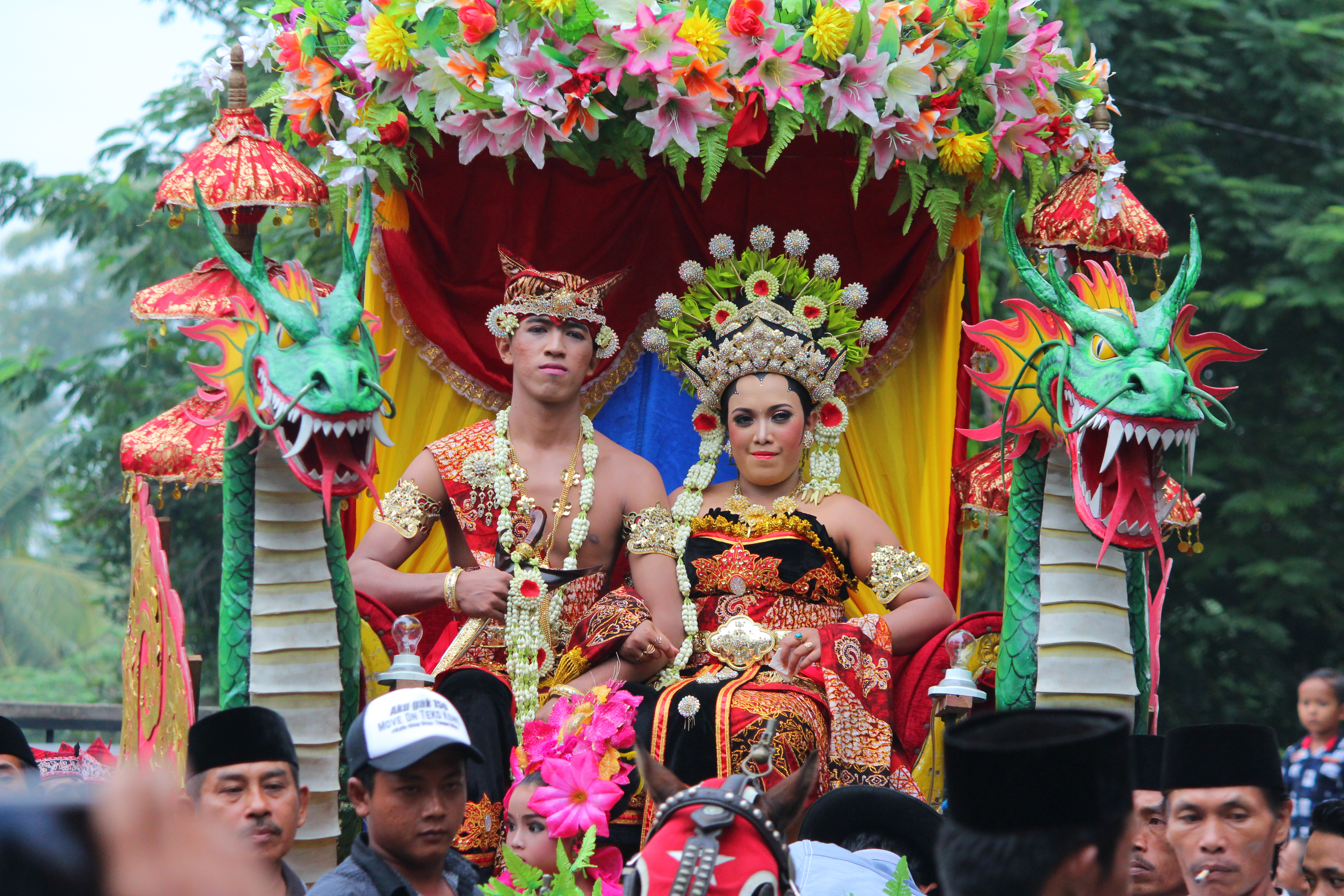
- Portrait of Osing groom and bride in Kemanten (wedding procession) wearing the traditional Mupus Braen attire in Banyuwangi

Total population
- 400,000

Regions with significant populations
- Indonesia (Banyuwangi Regency, East Java)

Languages
- Native: Osing languages; Also: Javanese (arek dialect); Indonesian

Religion
- Majority; Islam; Minorities; Christianity; Hinduism

Related ethnic groups
- Other Javanese sub-ethnic groups such as: Cirebonese, Banyumas, Tenggerese, etc, Pendalunganese, Balinese

The Osing or Using (Osing: Lare Osing; Lare Using) are a sub-group of Javanese people native to the easternmost part of Java (especially in Banyuwangi), Indonesia. They are the descendants of the people of the ancient Kingdom of Blambangan. The population of Osing people is approximately 400,000 who are concentrated in the Banyuwangi Regency of East Java Province.

== Demography ==
The Osing people are settled in several districts in the central and northern regions of Banyuwangi Regency especially in Banyuwangi district, Rogojampi district, Sempu district, Glagah district, Singojuruh district, Giri district, Kalipuro district and Songgon district. The Osing community or also commonly known as Laré Osing by some circles and as a result of research, are considered as the natives of Banyuwangi Regency, including an area at the easternmost tip of the Java island that is also known as Blambangan Peninsula. This community of people are spread throughout fertile farming villages in the central and eastern regions of Banyuwangi Regency, administratively includes districts such as Giri, Kabat, Glagah, Belimbing Sari, Rogojampi, Sempu, Singojuruh, Songgon, Cluring, Banyuwangi (city), Genteng and Srono. In the four later districts, integration with non-Osing people occurs usually with migrants from western East Java, Central Java including Jogjakarta; which the Osing people refer them as Wong Jawa Kulon (Western Javanese people).

== Language ==
The native language of Osing people is the Osing language, it is categorized as part of the Javanese language family. Linguistically speaking, this language has been influenced heavily by its neighbour notably the Standard Javanese (mainly eastern dialects) and Balinese. The main factor is probably due to Osing's cultural land which located between the two cultural lands of Javanese and Balinese people.

== History ==
The history of the Osing people began in the late 15th century, with the fall of Majapahit. The Blambangan kingdom, previously a vassal of Majapahit, still existed. Much of eastern Java was converted to Islam in the 16th century.Hindu princes continued to rule the Blambangan Kingdom, which stretched from the Blambangan Peninsula to the Tengger Mountains in East Java. Blambangan ruled for over two hundred years before surrendering to the Dutch East India Company (VOC) in 1743, ultimately conquering the Osing people. However, the conversion process wasn't complete until the mid-19th century, although small Muslim communities existed before that time. The Osing people's conversion occurred in the 18th century, when Banyuwangi was still largely unoccupied by Dutch colonial rule. However, because the Dutch were convinced of the high cost of losses and casualties, (as occurred previously in the Puputan Bayu War or Blambangan War in 1771–1773) they sent Javanese from Central and East Java to populate parts of western Blambangan. Only then was Banyuwangi captured, and the Dutch launched a long and ambitious dream of further colonizing Bali

After the Dutch East India Company completely conquered the region in 1767, the Dutch settled many Madurese there.

== Religion ==
The Osings are adherents of Islam, Elements of animism can be seen in their religion too. The Osings share a similar culture and spirit with the Balinese. Just like the Balinese people, the Osing people also share the puputan tradition. It is not uncommon to see mosques and puras (Balinese Hindu temples) to be built nearby to each other in Banyuwangi.

== Vocation ==
The main profession of the Osing people are farmers with a small number of them are traders and officers in formal areas of employment such as teachers and local government officials.

== Culture ==
=== Social stratification ===
The Osing people differ from the Balinese people in terms of social stratification as the majority of the Osing are Muslims but even the Hindu Osing do not practice the caste system like the Balinese people, even though they are Hindus. This is because of the Islamic influences that is practiced by a significant number of Muslims in their community.

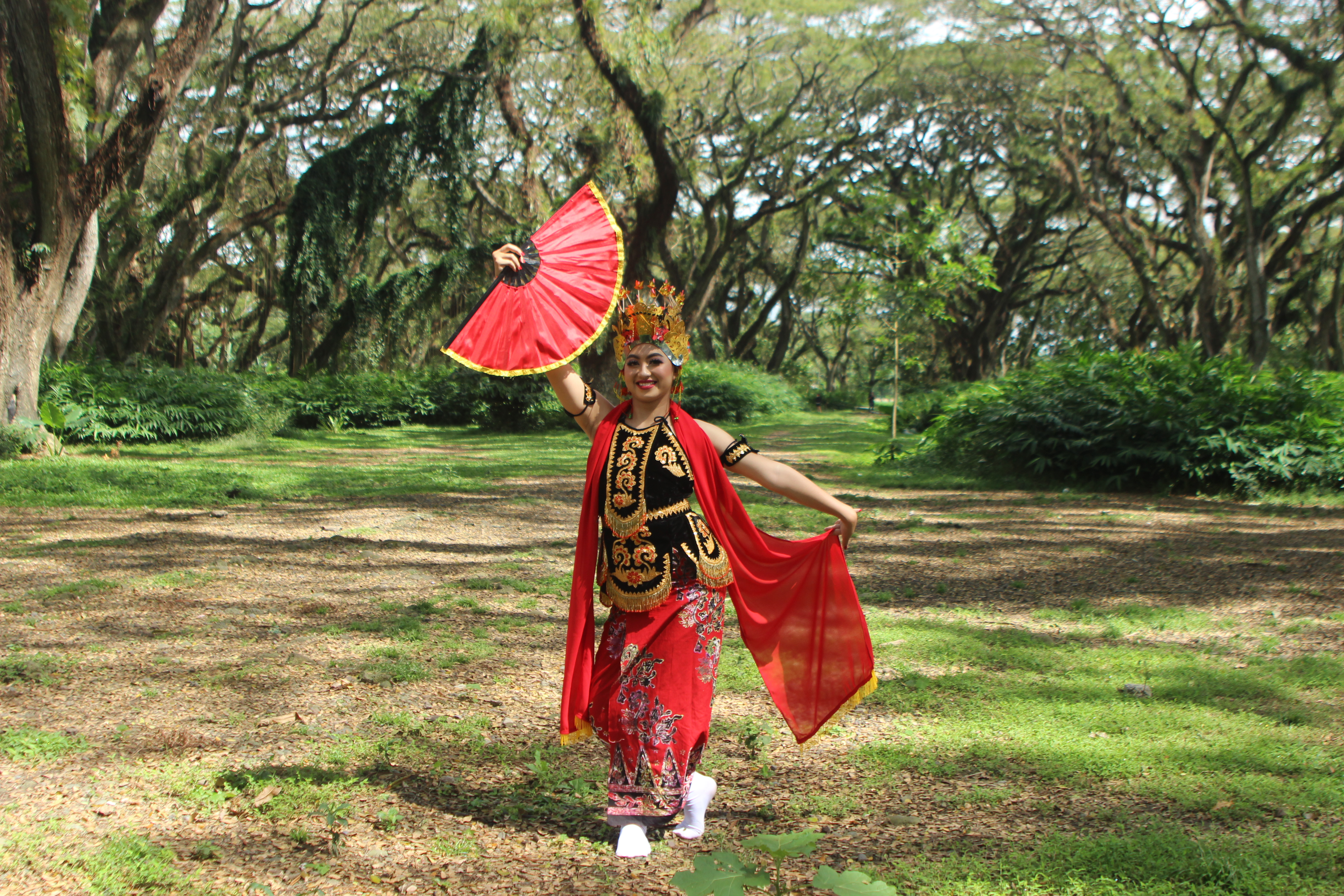
A Gandrung Dancer

=== Art ===
The Osing people's various art forms are unique and contains mystical elements just like their Balinese and Javanese relatives. The main art form is their popular version of Gandrung traditional dance., Patrol, Seblang, Angklung, Barong dance, Kuntulan, Kendang Kempul, Janger, Jaranan, Jaran Kincak, Angklung Caruk and Jedor.

Other art forms that are still preserved is the nursery rhyme, especially among school children such as Jamuran and Ojo Rame-Rame. These short poem nursery rhymes in general are used to accompany during children's play. Apart from adding a cheerful atmosphere when children are playing in groups, these nursery rhymes can work to teach positive values in early childhood. Jamuran nursery rhyme teaches about communal work, while Ojo Rame-Rame teaches patriotism.

== Customary village ==
The government of Banyuwangi Regency sees great potential in the culture of the Osing people by establishing Kemiren village in Glagah district as a customary village that preserves the cultural values of the Osing people. Kemiren village is also a tourist destination that is popular among the Banyuwangi people and its surrounding communities. Cultural festivals and annual artistic events are often held in the village.
