= Srono =

- District
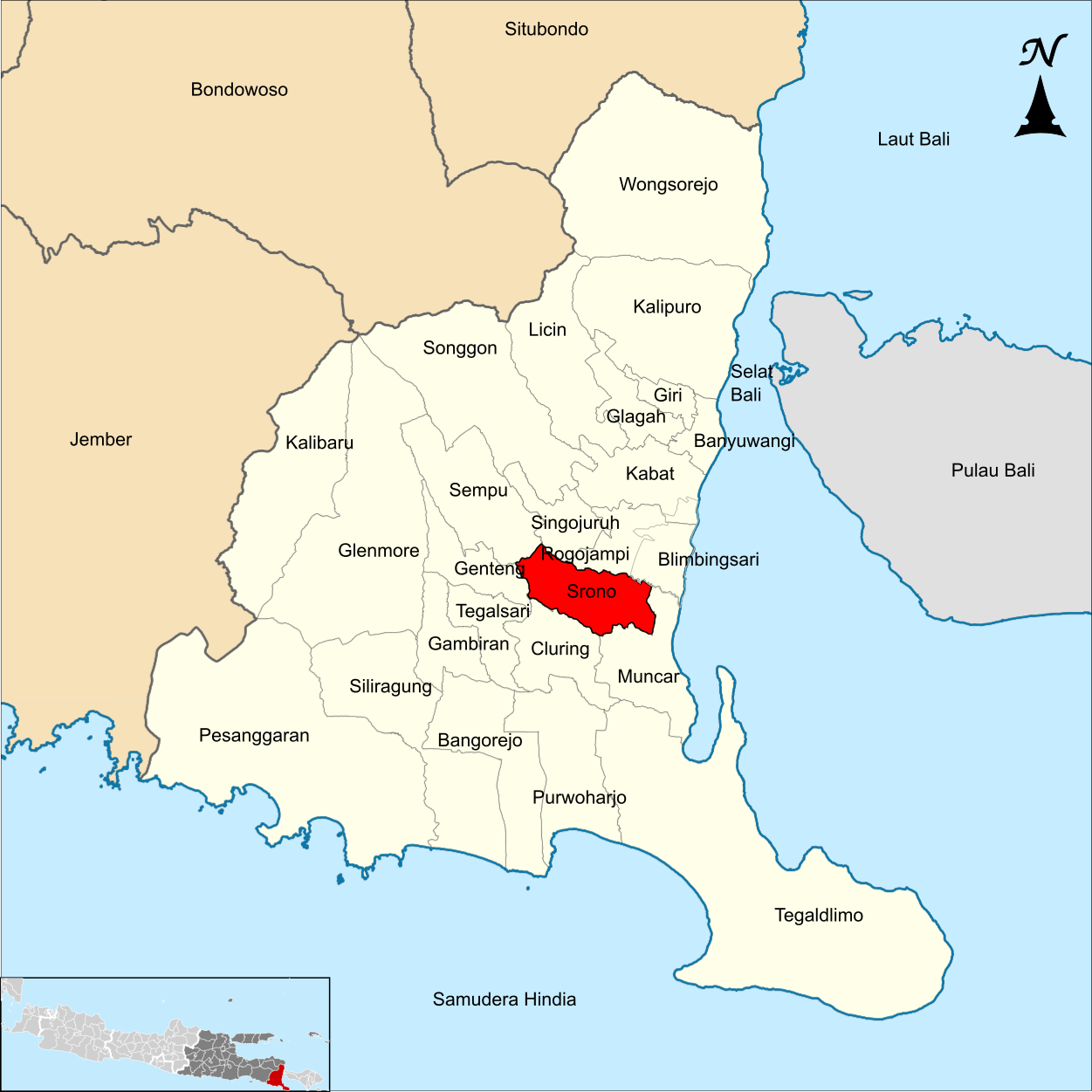
- Location in Banyuwangi Regency
- Coordinates: 8°22′40″S 114°15′35″E
- Country: Indonesia
- Province: East Java
- Regency: Banyuwangi

Area
  - Total: 100.77 km^{2} (38.91 sq mi)

Population (2020)
  - Total: 96,914
  - Density: 961.73/km^{2} (2,490.9/sq mi)
- Time zone: UTC+7 (WIB)
- Postal Code: 68471

Srono is a district (kecamatan) in Banyuwangi Regency, East Java, Indonesia.
