= Tegaldlimo =

- District
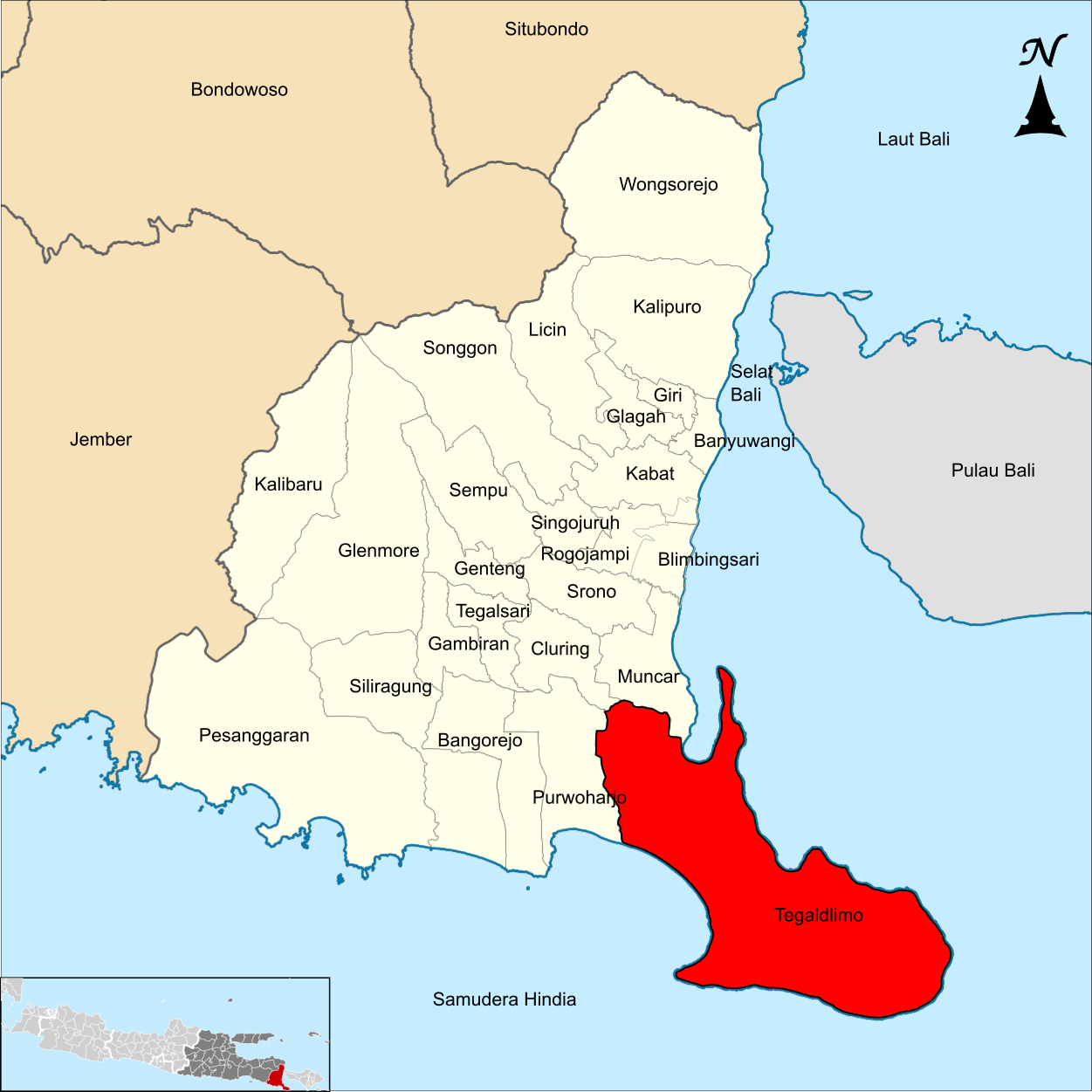
- Map of Banyuwangi Regency with Tegaldlimo highlighted
- Coordinates: 8°38′53″S 114°24′33″E
- Country: Indonesia
- Province: East Java
- Regency: Banyuwangi

Area
  - Total: 1,341.12 km^{2} (517.81 sq mi)

Population (mid 2025)
  - Total: 69,800
  - Density: 52.0/km^{2} (135/sq mi)
- Time zone: UTC+7 (WIB)
- Postal Code: 68484

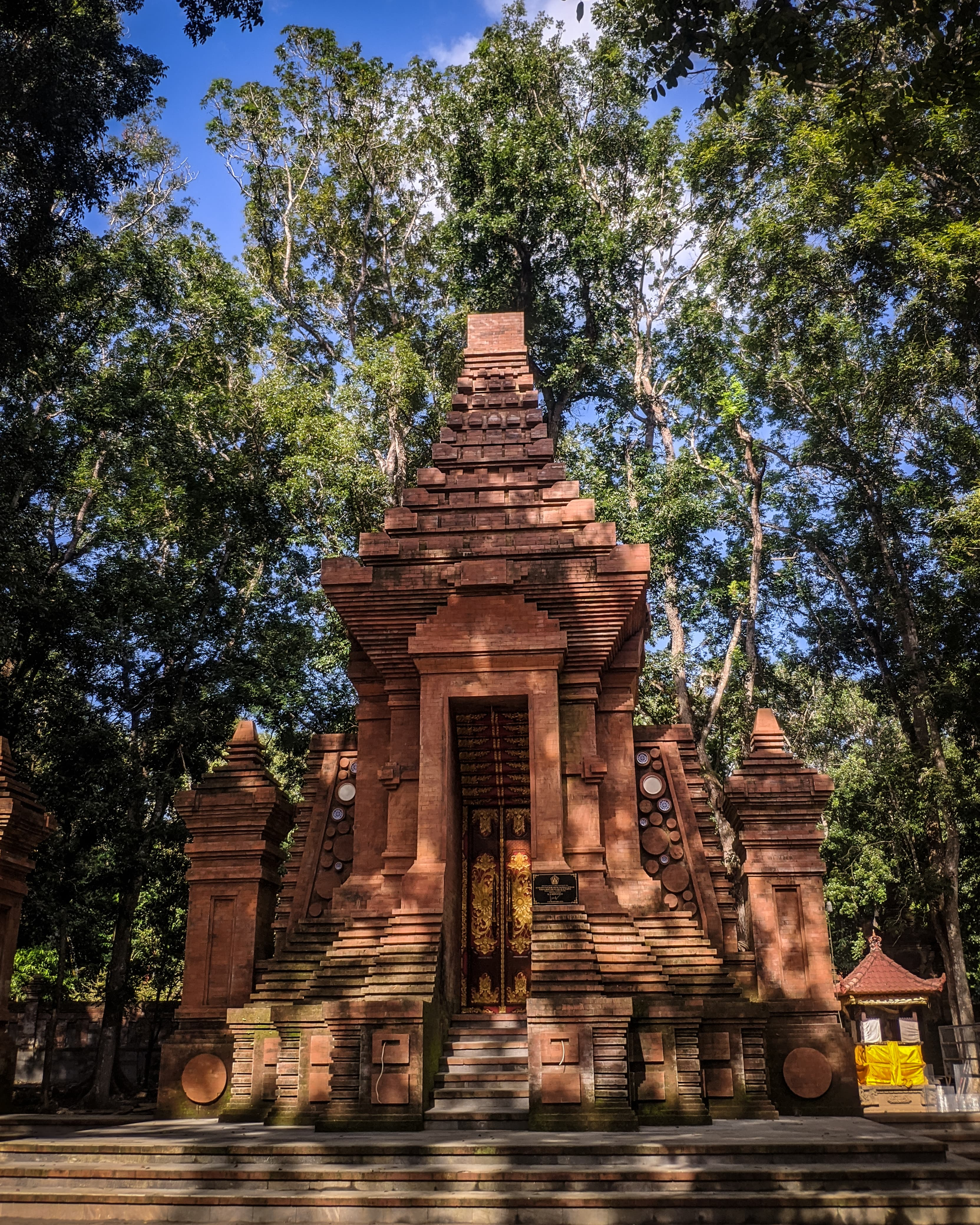
The Luhur Giri Salaka Hindu temple in Tegaldlimo

Tegaldlimo is an administrative district (kecamatan) of Banyuwangi Regency, East Java, Indonesia. It covers a land area of 1,341.12 km^{2}, and had a population of 66,737 at the 2020 Census; the official estimate as at mid 2025 was 69,800. It includes the entire Blambangan Peninsula at the extreme southeast corner of Java Island, where Alas Purwo National Park is located.
