= Gladag =

Gladag Desa Gladag
- Village
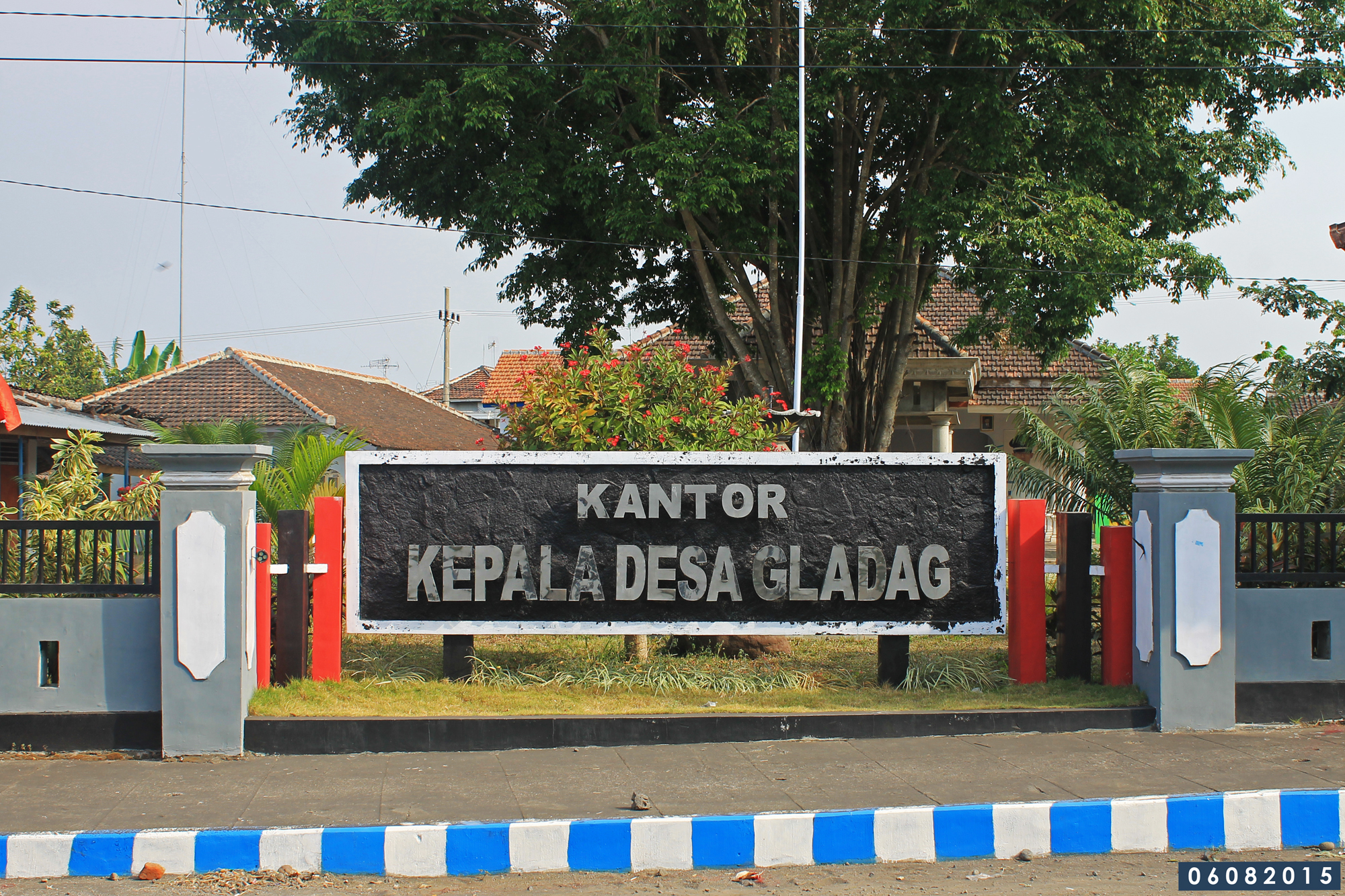

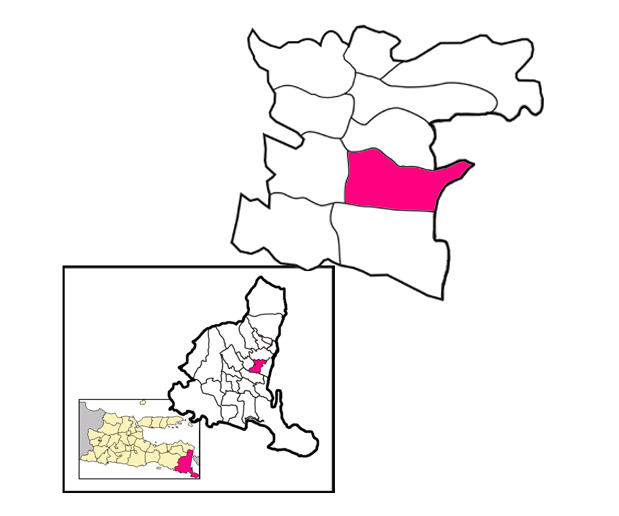
- Coordinates: 8°20′08″S 114°17′08″E
- Country: Indonesia
- Province: East Java
- Regency: Banyuwangi
- District: Rogojampi

Government
  - Type: village administration
  - Kepala Desa: A. Chaidir Sidqi

Area
  - Total: 3.4454 km^{2} (1.3303 sq mi)

Population (2010)
  - Total: 5,251
- 2010 National Census
- Time zone: Time in Indonesia (UTC+07:00)
- Zip Code: 68462
- Website: gladag.desa.id

Gladag (Indonesian pronunciation: [ˈɡladak̚]) is a village in the Rogojampi District, Banyuwangi Regency, East Java Province, Indonesia. The village consists of the hamlets of Krajan, Lateng, Susukan Kidal and Susukan Lor, and its population at the date of the 2010 Indonesian Census is given as 5,251. A citizen's forum was established in 2022 with representatives from each of the hamlets. The hamlet of Lateng is in a rice growing area. The name Gladag is a change in form of the word gletakan, which means to lie down or repose, and according to folklore the name was given to the village by Sulung Agung while resting in the area.
