= G-Land =

Surf break in Java, Indonesia

Location of G-Land in the southeastern edge of Java island, just across the strait from Bali.

G-Land, also known as Plengkung Beach, is an internationally renowned surf break on Grajagan Bay, Banyuwangi, Alas Purwo National Park, East Java, Indonesia, about half a day by road from the popular tourist destinations of Bali. It is most commonly reached via boat charter from Bali.

The discovery in the protected jungle of Alas Purwo began when West Australian surfer Barry Middleton searched intently for surf breaks throughout Indonesia, Timor, Roti, Flores, Sumba, Sumbawa, Lombok, Bali, Java and Sumatra. After discovering and surfing all the coral reef surf breaks of Bali, Barry started his search on the southeast coast of Java during mid-1971. Before that, whilst surfing in Western Australia, he had witnessed the huge rolling swells traveling north through the Indian Ocean. He had a theory there was great surfing potential in Indonesia.

His discovery was noted by Bob Laverty, and so the legendary tales began. Barry and Chris Lilley later set up the founding camp with the help of a Javanese fisherman who used his machete to cut bamboo from the Jungle and build Barry and Chris a huge bamboo bed to get away from the hundreds of hermit crabs and also built cupboards to stop the crab-eating macaque (Macaca fascicularis) and East Javan langur (Trachypithecus auratus) from raiding there provisions. Four years after the discovery, a mate of Barry's Mike Boyum helped set up the first surf camp at G-Land, which was possibly the start of the paying surf camp concept that has since spread across the globe. Balinese surfer Bobby Radiasa took over the operation in the late 70s and still runs it today. From the days of the original Boyum/Bobby's camp, other camps have opened at G-Land offering various standards of accommodation and facilities to suit a range of holiday budgets.

== Geomorphology ==
The south coast of Java faces the Indian Ocean, so it is exposed to large swells generated by low-pressure systems circling Antarctica, many thousands of kilometers to the south. G-Land is situated on the eastern side of the Bay of Grajagan, so it has a westerly aspect; i.e. at right angles to the predominant swell direction. As a result, swell wraps around the point and into the eastern side of the bay, producing long, walling left-handers, which peel at a rapid rate along a half-kilometer stretch of shallow coral reef, forming perfectly hollow tubes that remain open the whole way.

The wind at G-Land blows offshore between April and September, which also happens to be when the swells are at their largest and most consistent. Since the swells are generated by low-pressure systems circling Antarctica, their regularity coincides with the passage of these lows. So, the swell arrives in pulses, each lasting for a couple of days, with a couple of days between each swell.

Waves tend to be bigger and better at high tide, so it is best to plan a surf trip for the week following a full or new moon since this is when the tide is high during the middle of the day.

== Surf break ==
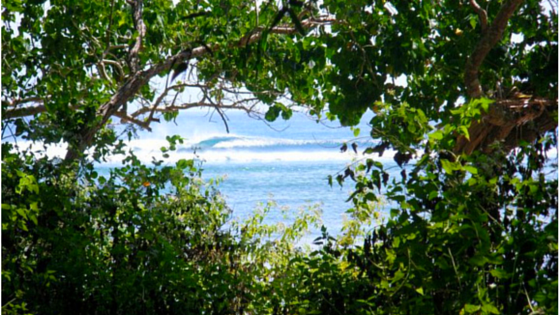
Looking through the jungle at 'Money-Trees' the most popular section of the wave.

A very long left-hand reef/point break breaks along the east side of Grajagan Bay. The correct name of the point upon which the main wave breaks is "Plengkung." The wave becomes shallower and more critical the further down the point one rides the wave. It has very consistently rideable waves when in season, with offshore tradewinds and often plentiful swell between the months of, roughly, mid-April to mid-October.

The G-Land surf break has been divided up into several sections. The first, at the top of the point, is called "Kongs," which break up to several hundred metres in length and can hold quite large sizes (from about 2 to 12 feet+, Hawaiian scale). It is not usually a barrel, nor genuinely world-class, but more a series of takeoff zones with some long wall sections, although it can also barrel on occasion. This is also where surfers can find the 'key-hole' which is a section of the reef that allows a more forgivable paddle out. This section picks up a lot of swells, is rarely less than 3 feet, and can be a saviour when the rest of the point is too small. This wave can sometimes link up with the next section called "Moneytrees." Moneytrees works from about 2 to 10 feet (Hawaiian scale, or about 4 to 20 feet wave faces), usually breaking over several hundred metres, and is a long, testing, barreling, world-class wave. The barrels become more critical the lower the tide and the larger the swell. Money trees may also occasionally link up with the next section called "Speedies," with an outside takeoff section between the two called "Launching Pads." "Launching Pads" can catch the surfer off-guard, as it can break a significant way out to sea in larger swells. "Speedies" (named after how fast the wave breaks) is the heaviest wave at G-Land, but can be a perfect, very round barrel for several hundred metres, rideable from about 2 to 8 feet+ (Hawaiian scale). It usually needs larger swells, and low tide can be very dangerous. Most severe injuries at G-Land have occurred at "Speedies."

It is not common to ride a wave more than about 300–400 metres at G-Land, even though the section of the point where rideable waves break is considerably longer (over 1 km long), because the waves usually don't link up with each other.

The dry season (May to October) is when the offshore southeast trade winds blow and the swell, pouring out of the Southern Ocean, is at its biggest and most consistent.

== Other nearby surf breaks ==
There are a few other, smaller waves further down and within the bay, which include "Chickens," "20/20," "Tiger Tracks," "Parang Ireng," and a few unnamed others. These waves generally only work on larger swells, but are surprisingly good alternatives when the main point is big. All of these waves can barrel in the right conditions, which generally require higher tides. There are also some right hand waves on the other side of the peninsula at G-Land, but they are fickle, requiring large swells, and no wind or off-season winds.

Another right-hand wave is situated about 20 miles east of G-land, which has been featured in Indonesian surf magazines, and dubbed as "Reverse G." It is a quality, long, right-hand wave (the 'reverse' of G-Land) but which is very difficult to get to, requiring some boat access, and only works in off-season winds (about late November to April).

== See also ==
- Nias, other notable surfing spot in Indonesia
- List of beaches in Indonesia, for other beaches in Indonesia.
