= Licin =

- Town
- Location in Banyuwangi Regency, Java and Indonesia Licin (Java) Licin (Indonesia)
- Coordinates: 8.15857°S 114.23636°E
- Country: Indonesia
- Region: Java
- Province: East Java
- Regency: Banyuwangi Regency
- Time zone: UTC+7 (IWST)
- Area code: (+62) 333
- Villages: 8
- Website: licin.banyuwangikab.go.id

For the area in Sumatra see Napal Licin and for the area in Kalimantan, Borneo see Batulicin. Licin is an area of the Banyuwangi Regency, East Java, Indonesia.

Henry Ogg Forbes identified Boea treubii of the genus Boea during his expeditions from 1878 until 1883. He described the flower as "sungularly beautiful" when he saw it in full flower November 1881 near Napal Litjin at 580 feet above sea level. among calcareous blocks near the summit of Karangnata amongst Caelogynes and "pink-fruited" Malastomacae. He named it in honor of Dr. Treub, director of the Buitenzorg Botanic Gardens.

== Gallery ==
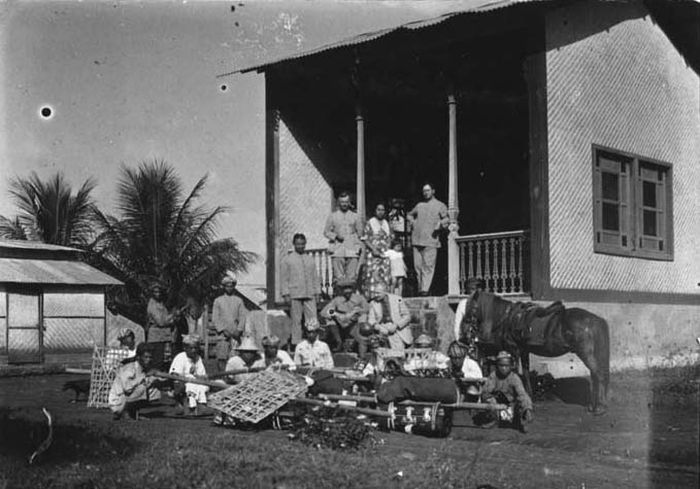
Java family home "Ottolander" Litjin at 437 m (circa 1915)

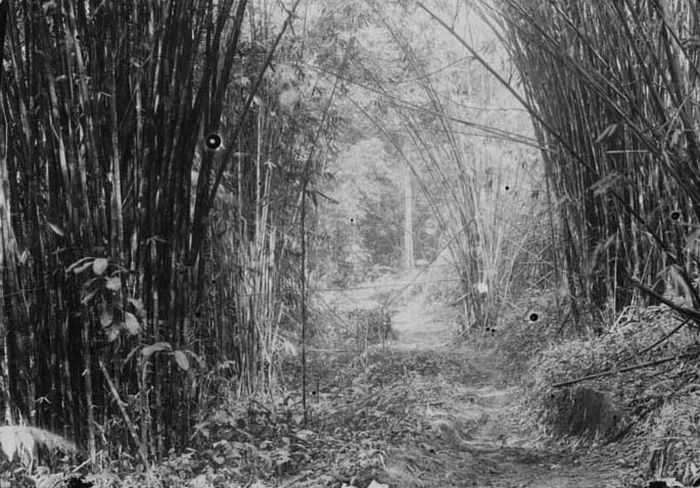
Central Java Bamboo route from Litjin to the "kawah" at 750 m (circa 1915)
