= Janger dance =

Indonesian traditional dance

Janger
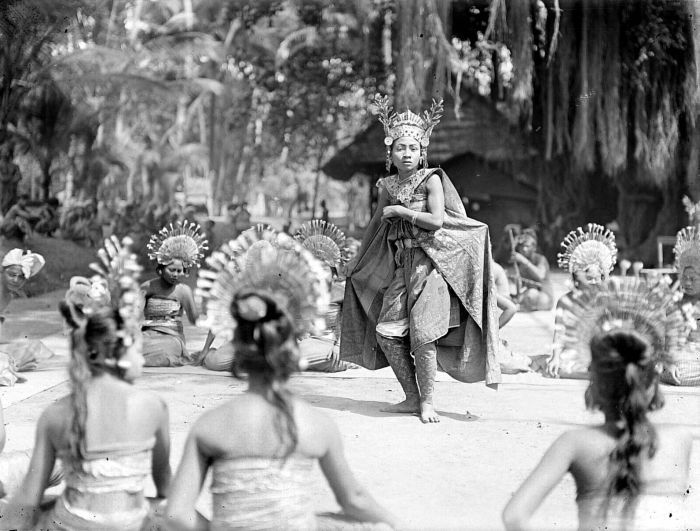
- Performance of janger dance
- Native name: ᬚᬗᬾᬃ (Balinese); Tari Janger (Indonesian)
- Instrument(s): Gamelan, Kendhang
- Inventor: Balinese and Osing
- Origin: Indonesia

Janger (Balinese: ᬚᬗᬾᬃ) is a traditional Balinese and Osing dance drama performance originated from the Indonesian island of Bali, and commonly performed by Balinese in Bali as well as Osing people in the easternmost region of Java. The term roughly translates to '"infatuation," with a connotation of someone who is madly in love" ^{:97}

== History ==
Janger is a social dance created in the 1920s, though its exact date of origin is unknown^{:17, 161} I Madé Kredek claims it 'originated in the village of Menyali, North Bali and the songs featured in it were those of the horse drivers in the area.'^{:101}

== Performance ==
Janger is a 'flirtatious youth group dance'^{:92} which begins with a tableau vivant and a welcoming song.^{:161} This is followed by 12 male dancers (kecak) who perform an elaborate routine. When finished, they sit in two rows of six facing each other, and then, a female group (janger) enters the area, sings a traditional folk song,^{:161} and performs a slower dance with an 'emphasis on fluid, undulating, arm movements'.^{:100} When finished, they form two lines of six, with the male dancers 'forming a boundary around the playing area.'^{:161} This opening is followed by a drama, which usually concerns some sort of domestic theme.^{:162}

== Gallery ==
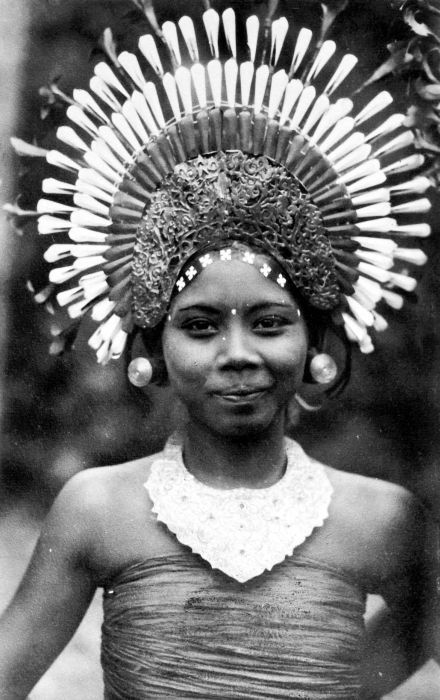
Janger dancers

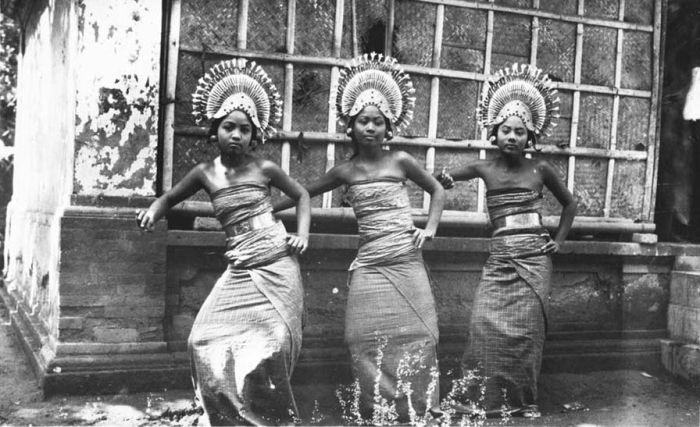
Janger performance

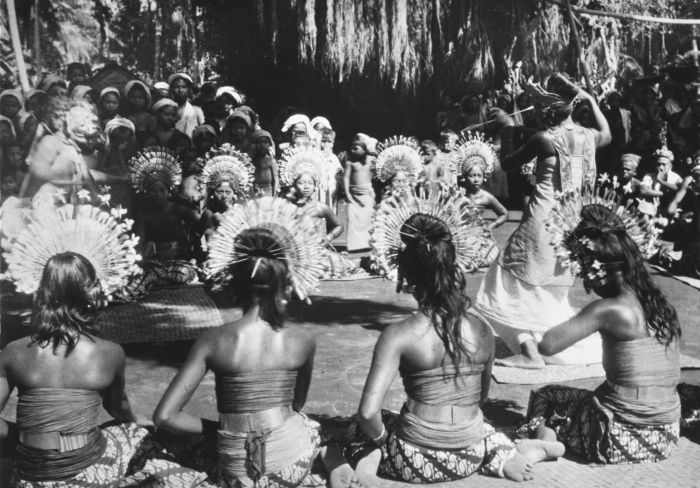
Janger performance, back view

== See also ==
- Gandrung
- Kecak
