= Blambangan Peninsula =

Coordinates: 8.7°S 114.5°E

Blambangan Peninsula is located at the southeastern end of Java Island. Administratively this peninsula is entirely within the Tegaldlimo District of Banyuwangi Regency. It is the location of the 434.2 square kilometres (167.6 sq mi) Alas Purwo National Park. This peninsula contains Cape Bantenan, the southernmost point of Java, and Cape Slaka, the easternmost point of Java.

== World’s Biosphere Reserves ==
In mid-March 2016, UNESCO declared Blambangan Biosphere Reserve to consist of four conservation areas, namely the Alas Purwo National Park, the Baluran National Park, the Meru Betiri National Park, and Ijen Crater Natural Reserve. It is the eleventh of Indonesia's biosphere reserves acknowledged by UNESCO.
