= Songgon =

- District
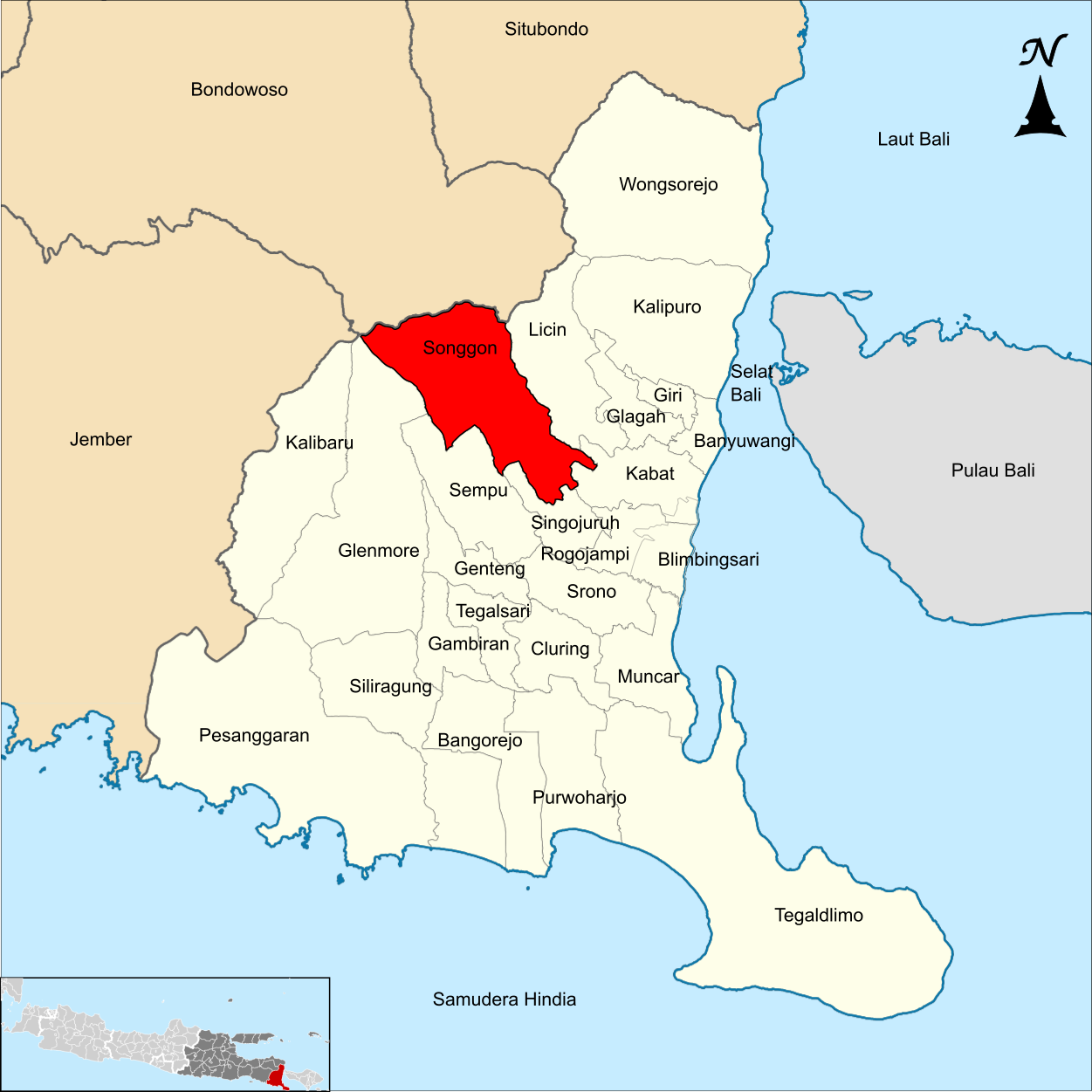
- Location of Songgon in Banyuwangi Regency
- Coordinates: 8°11′10″S 114°09′40″E
- Country: Indonesia
- Province: East Java
- Regency: Banyuwangi

Area
  - Total: 212.0 km^{2} (81.9 sq mi)

Population (2010)
  - Total: 50,275
  - Density: 237.1/km^{2} (614.2/sq mi)
- Time zone: UTC+7 (WIB)
- Postal Code: 68463
- Vehicle registration: P

Songgon is a district (kecamatan) in Banyuwangi Regency, East Java, Indonesia.
