= Alas Purwo National Park =

National parks of Indonesia

- Taman Nasional Alas Purwo
- IUCN category II (national park)
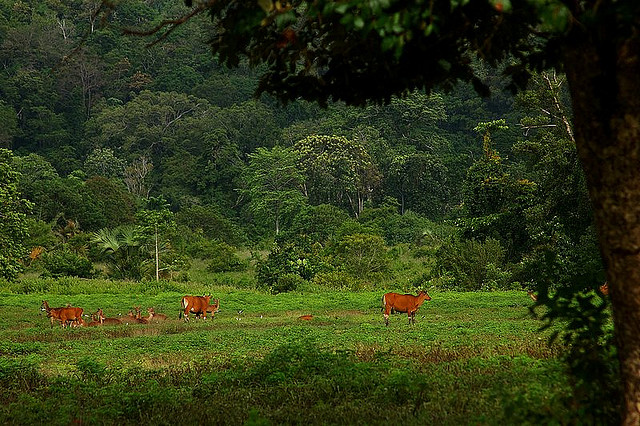
- Banteng (Bos javanicus) in the national park

- Location within Java
- Location: East Java, Indonesia
- Nearest city: Banyuwangi
- Coordinates: 8°41′S 114°28′E
- Area: 434.20 km^{2} (167.65 sq mi)
- Established: 1992
- Visitors: 14,720 (in 2006)
- Governing body: Ministry of Environment and Forestry
- Website: tnalaspurwo.org

Alas Purwo National Park is situated at Tegaldlimo, Banyuwangi Regency, on the Blambangan Peninsula at the southeastern tip of East Java province. The park is famous for its wild Banteng and surfing location at Grajagan Bay.

The park's name means first forest or ancient forest, following a Javanese legend that says the earth first emerged from the ocean here.

== Geography ==
The park is located in Blambangan Peninsula at the southeastern tip of Java island, along the shore of the strait across Bali.

With an area of 434 km^{2}, the park is made up of mangroves, savanna, lowland monsoon forests, and coral-fringed beaches. An internationally renowned surf break peels along the edge of the park at Plengkung on Grajagan Bay. Mount Linggamanis (322m) is also located in this national park.

== Culture ==
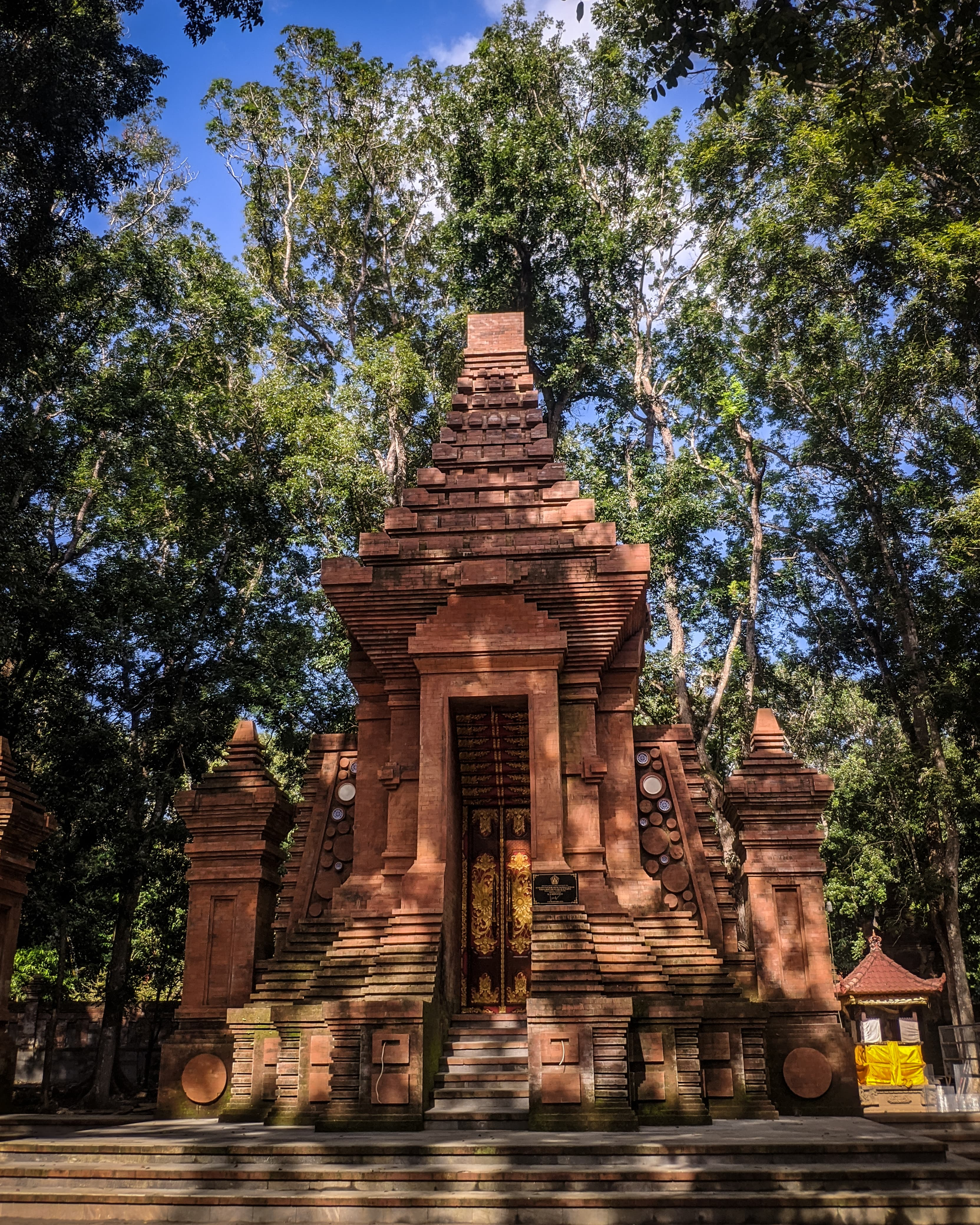
The Luhur Giri Salaka Hindu temple in Tegaldlimo

== Flora and fauna ==
The flora protected in this national park include Terminalia catappa, Calophyllum inophyllum, Sterculia foetida, Barringtonia asiatica, and Manilkara kauki.

It is home to some of Java's endangered species, such as the banteng (Bos javanicus). In April 2004, there were only 57 bantengs found in the savanna of Sadengan, while the population in the previous year was estimated to be 80 to 100, but in August 2010, the scientists found 73 bantengs in the 80-hectare savanna area, a big increase in 6 years, although they faced threats of poaching and loss of habitat. Herds of bantengs usually come to Sadengan in the morning and afternoon in search of plants.

The biggest threat to the bantengs are humans. Poachers set traps outside the park during the dry season to snare bantengs wandering outside the park in search of water. The bantengs are slaughtered and the meat is sold.

Other threatened animal species protected in Alas Purwo include the dhole, Javan langur, green peafowl, red junglefowl, olive ridley, hawksbill turtle, and green turtle.

== Surfing ==
Between the months of March and November, thousands of surfers from all over the world visit the park for its surf break. The destination is Plengkung Beach in Grajagan Bay, also known as G-Land, which is about half a day's travel from Bali.

The beach is considered one of the best surfing spots in Asia. With rideable waves up to 5 meters, it is considered a spot for experienced surfers only. The place is listed as Quicksilver World Tour Circuit.
