= Banyuwangi Regency =

Regency in East Java, Indonesia

Banyuwangi Regency Kabupaten Banyuwangi Blambangan
- Regency

Other transcription(s)
  - Osing: Byanyuwangai (Latin) بياۑوواڠاي (Pego) ꦧꦾꦚꦸꦮꦔꦻ (Hanacaraka)
  - Javanese: Banyuwangi (Gêdrig) باۑوواڠي (Pégon) ꦧꦚꦸꦮꦔꦶ (Hånåcåråkå)
  - Madurese: Bhânyowangè (Latèn) بۤاۑَوواڠَي (Pèghu) ꦨꦚꦺꦴꦮꦔꦺ (Carakan)
  - Balinese: Bañuwaṅi (Latin) ᬩᬜᬸᬯᬗᬶ (Wyañjana)
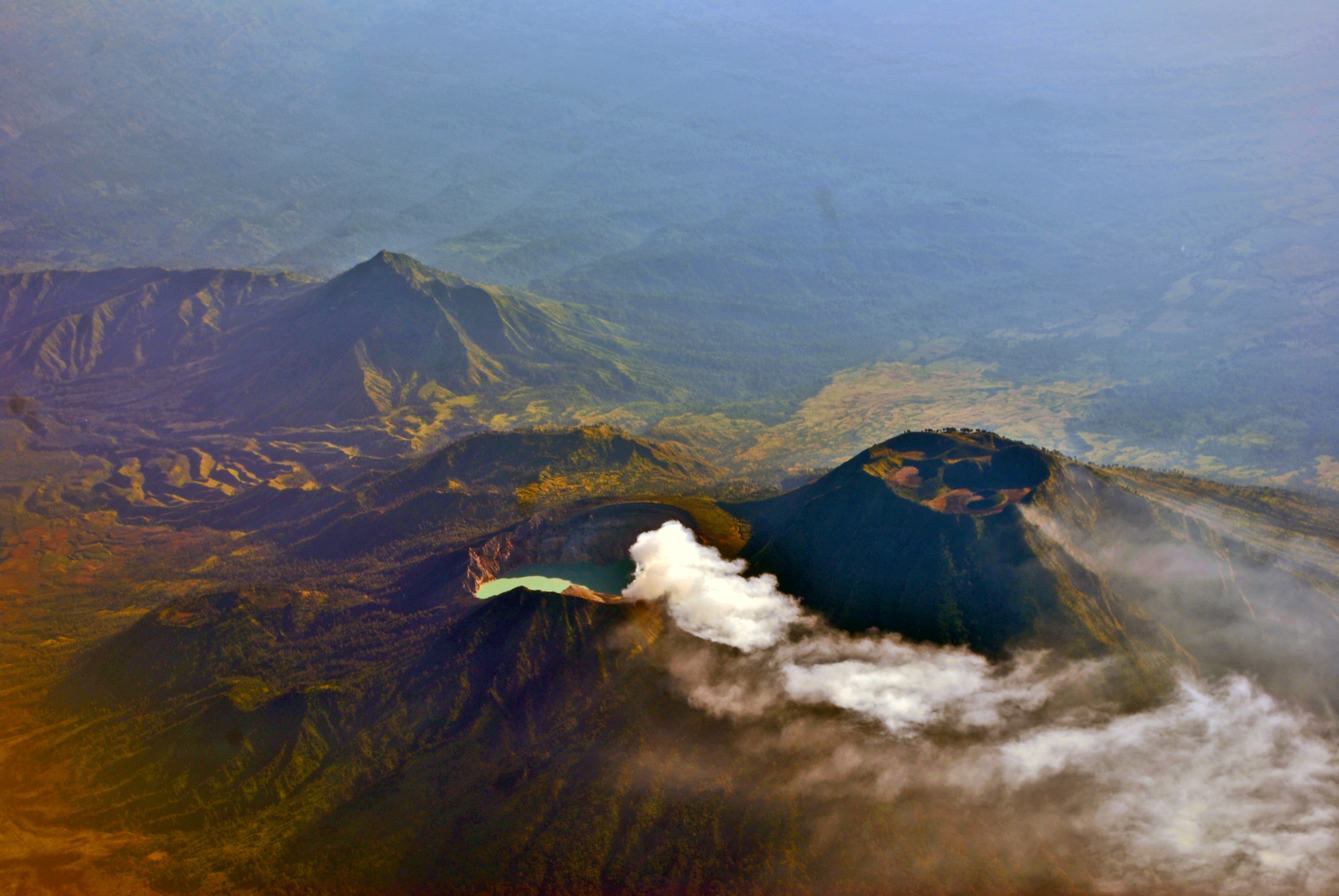
- Ijen volcano complex

- Coat of arms
- Mottoes: Satya Bhakti Praja Mukti (Sanskrit) (devoted to the truth for the welfare of the people)
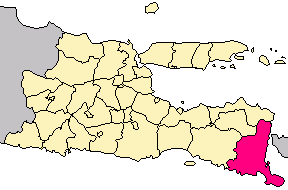
- Location within East Java

- Location in Java and Indonesia Banyuwangi Regency (Indonesia)
- Coordinates: 8°13′36″S 114°21′59″E
- Country: Indonesia
- Province: East Java
- Anniversary: 18 December 1771
- Capital: Banyuwangi

Government
  - Regent: Ipuk Fiestiandani
  - Vice Regent: Mujiono

Area
  - Total: 5,782.50 km^{2} (2,232.64 sq mi)

Population (mid 2025 estimate)
  - Total: 1,812,709
  - Density: 313.482/km^{2} (811.914/sq mi)
- Time zone: UTC+7 (IWST)
- Area code: (+62) 333
- Website: banyuwangikab.go.id

Banyuwangi Regency (Javanese: ꦏꦧꦸꦥꦠꦺꦤ꧀ꦧꦚꦸꦮꦔꦶ, Pegon: كابوڤاتَين باۑوواڠي, romanized: Kabupatèn Banyuwangi) is a regency of East Java province in Indonesia. This regency also known as the sun rise of Java because it is located at the easternmost end of Java Island. The town of Banyuwangi serves as a port for ferry services between Java and Bali. The regency is surrounded by mountains and forests to the west; by sea to the east and south - is separated by the Bali Strait from Bali. With an area of 5,782.50 km^{2}, this regency is the third largest on the island of Java after Cianjur Regency and Sukabumi Regency in West Java. The regency is a tourist destination, and subject to ongoing development as an international tourist destination with relevant infrastructure. Banyuwangi regency has been declared a taman bumi (earth park), or national geological park (Geopark) in 2018.

It had a population of 1,488,791 according to the 2000 Census; by the 2010 Census it had risen to 1,556,078; and at the 2020 Census to 1,708,114; the official estimate as at mid 2025 was 1,812,709 (comprising 903,755 males and 908,954 females). The town of Banyuwangi is the administrative capital. The name Banyuwangi is Javanese for "fragrant waters", connected to the Javanese folklore of Sri Tanjung.

== Society and history ==
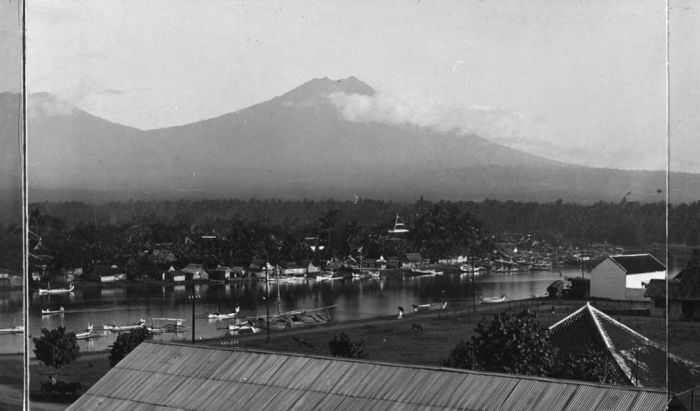
View of Banyuwangi during colonial period

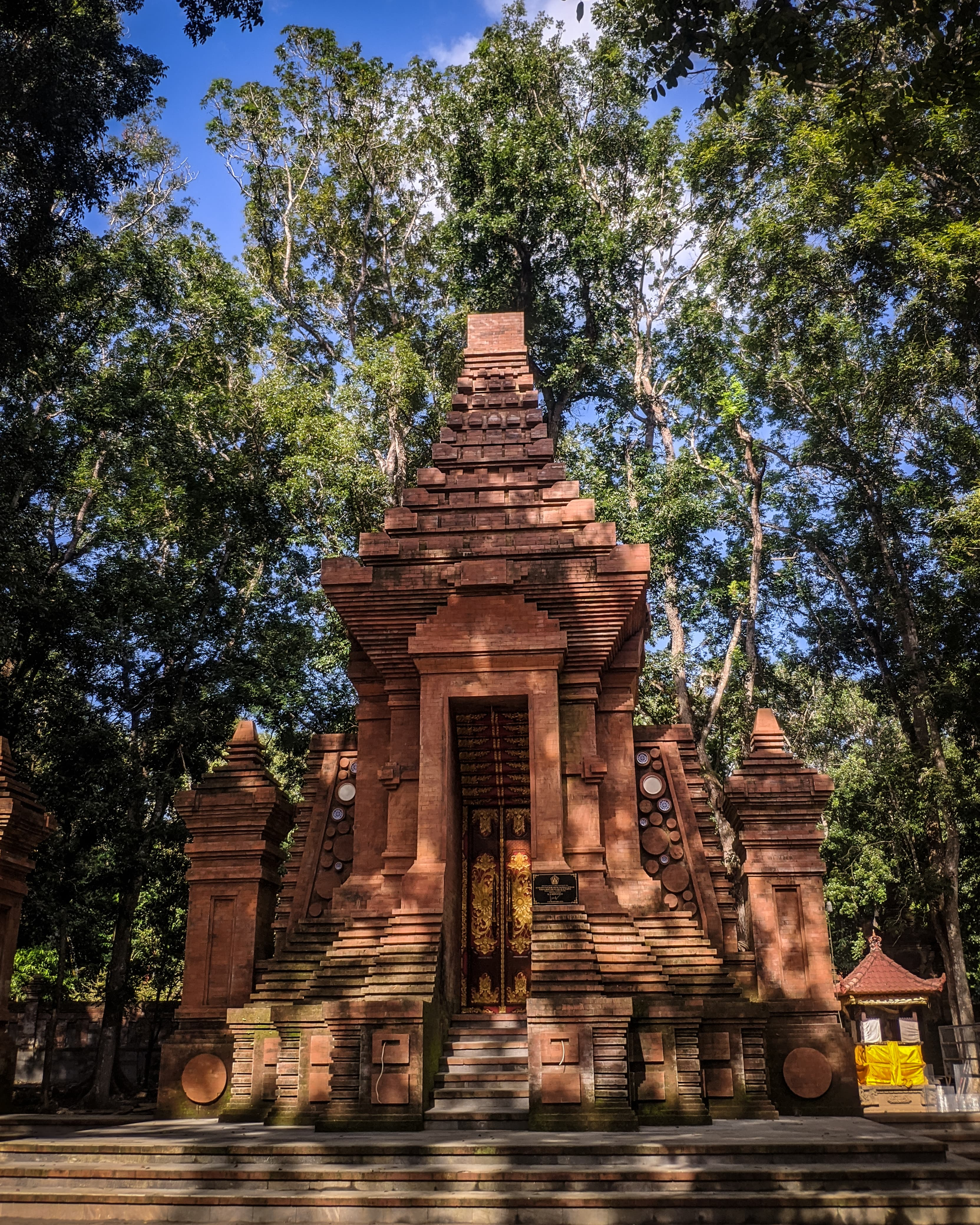
The Luhur Giri Salaka Hindu temple in Tegaldlimo

One Banyuwangi native group is the Osing community which has a Hindu culture although they can be considered as a Javanese sub-ethnic group. They live mainly in the central part of Banyuwangi and they sometimes consider themselves as Majapahit descendants. Other groups are Javanese (living mostly in the south and west), Madurese (mainly in the north, west, and coastal area) and Balinese (scattered but more concentrated in the east). Other smaller groups include Chinese, Buginese, and Arabs.

Once known as Blambangan Kingdom (or its variation: Balambangan and Balumbungan), it was a vassal of the Majapahit Kingdom and a regional trade centre. Blambangan's autonomy grew considerably after the end of 14th century AD. After the Majapahit Kingdom ceased to exist, it became an independent kingdom and, as such, the last Hindu kingdom of Java. In order to defend itself from the troops of the Demak Sultanate, which tried to occupy it, Blambangan asked for help from Balinese kings, which caused it to lose its independence to Balinese kingdoms. During this time Blambangan was deeply influenced by Balinese culture. After around 150 years of Balinese occupation, the Mataram Sultanate gained control of the territory and renamed it Banyuwangi. Tawangalun II of Blambangan freed Blambangan from Mataram sultanate during Trunajaya revolt and built the capital of Macan Putih, near modern day Banyuwangi. Later, it was part of the Mataram territory controlled by the VOC (1770). During the expansion of plantations in the 19th century, many parts of Banyuwangi were planted with coffee and sugar cane, which feature its landscape even now. The Chinese and Arabs came mostly during this period.

Banyuwangi people are known for their combination of Islamic and pre-Islamic tradition.

During the Fall of Suharto, a witchhunt in Banyuwangi (town) against alleged sorcerers spiraled into widespread riots and violence. In addition to alleged sorcerers, Islamic clerics were also targeted and killed, and Nahdlatul Ulama members were murdered by rioters.

== Culture ==
The Blambangan Peninsula is one of the remaining places in Java where Hindu culture is still retained, having a Balinese influence.

=== Gandrung Dance ===
This is a Banyuwangi-typical dance performed by a woman, accompanied with simple music from a violin, triangle (called kluncing), gong (or kempul), kendhang and sometimes keyboard as result of modern influence. It is performed during night until dawn, particularly in parties.

=== Janger or Damarwulan ===
Damarwulan is a legendary hero who features in traditional theatre art, which has been developed since the 19th century in Banyuwangi. It is a combination of Balinese, Javanese and local cultures. Balinese influences can be seen in its performers' costumes and instruments. Meanwhile, Javanese influences is in its "lakon" or stories as well as language in dialogues. It is distinct from the Balinese Janger dance.

== Administrative districts ==
Administration of Banyuwangi Regency

At the time of the 2010 census, Banyuwangi Regency was divided into twenty-four districts (Indonesian: kecamatan), but an additional district - Blimbingsari - was subsequently created on 9 January 2017 from part of Rogojampi District. The twenty-five districts are listed below with their areas and their populations at the 2020 Census and the 2020 Census, together with the official estimates as at mid 2025. The table also includes the locations of the district administrative centres, the number of villages in each district (totaling 189 rural desa and 28 urban kelurahan), and its postal codes.

Kode Wilayah	Name of District (kecamatan)	Area in km^{2}	Pop'n Census 2010	Pop'n Census 2020	Pop'n Estimate mid 2025	Admin centre	No. of villages	Post codes
35.10.01	Pesanggaran ^{(a)}	802.50	48,412	53,373	58,800	Sumberagung	5	68488
35.10.22	Siliragung	95.15	44,390	48,678	51,800	Siliragung	5	68489
35.10.02	Bangorejo	137.43	59,442	65,709	69,300	Kebondalem	7	68487
35.10.03	Purwoharjo ^{(b)}	200.30	64,969	69,471	72,400	Purwoharjo	8	68483
35.10.04	Tegaldlimo	1,341.12	61,176	66,737	69,800	Tegaldlimo	9	68484
35.10.05	Muncar	146.07	128,924	136,425	142,000	Blambangan	10	68472
35.10.06	Cluring	97.44	70,049	77,417	81,800	Cluring	9	68482
35.10.07	Gambiran	66.77	58,412	66,187	70,200	Wringinagung	6	68486
35.10.23	Tegalsari	65.23	46,161	52,361	55,200	Tegalsari	6	68485
35.10.10	Glenmore	421.98	69,471	75,365	80,100	Karangharjo	7	68466
35.10.11	Kalibaru	406.76	61,182	65,142	69,600	Kalibaruwetan	6	68467
35.10.09	Genteng	82.34	83,123	92,448	99,500	Gentang Wetan	5	68465
35.10.08	Srono	100.77	87,209	96,914	102,000	Sukomaju	10	68471
	Totals of southern two-thirds	3,963.86	882,920	966,227	1,025,700		93	
35.10.13	Rogojampi	48.51	92,358	57,217	58,800	Rogojampi	10	68462
35.10.25	Blimbingsari	67.13	^{(c)}	54,341	58,000	Blimbingsari	10	68460 & 68461
35.10.14	Kabat	94.17	67,137	63,413	67,700	Kabat	14	68461
35.10.12	Singojuruh	59.89	45,242	50,463	53,800	Singojuruh	11	68464
35.10.20	Sempu	174.83	71,281	83,100	89,800	Sempu	7	68468
35.10.19	Songgon	301.84	50,275	57,077	60,000	Tegalarum	9	68463
35.10.15	Glagah	76.75	33,992	36,532	39,000	Glagah	10 ^{(d)}	68431 & 68432
35.10.24	Licin	169.25	27,878	29,460	31,100	Licin	8	68454
35.10.16	Banyuwangi (town) ^{(e)}	30.13	106,000	117,558	122,000	Tukangkayu	18 ^{(f)}	68411 - 68419
35.10.17	Giri	21.31	28,510	31,621	33,400	Mojopanggung	6 ^{(g)}	68422 - 68425
35.10.21	Kalipuro	310.03	76,178	83,685	89,300	Kalipuro	9 ^{(h)}	68421 - 68455
35.10.18	Wongsorejo ^{(i)}	464.80	74,307	77,420	84,100	Wongsorejo	12	68453
	Totals of northern third	1,818.64	673,158	741,887	787,000		124	
	Totals	5,782.50	1,556,078	1,708,114	1,812,709	Banyuwangi (town)	217	

Note: (a) included 10 small offshore islands. (b) includes small offshore islands of Pulau Parengan and Pulau Watulayar.
(c) The 2010 population of the new Blimbingsari District is included in the figure for Rogojampi District from which it was cut out.
(d) including 2 urban kelurahan (Bakungan and Banjarsari). (e) includes small offshore islands of Pulau Boom and Pulau Santen.
(f) all 18 are kelurahan (Kampung Mandar, Kampung Melayu, Karangrejo, Kebalenan, Kepatihan, Kertosari, Lateng, Pakis, Panderejo, Penganjuran, Pengantigan, Singonegaran, Singotrunan, Sobo, Sumber Rejo, Taman Baru, Temenggungan and Tukang Kayu).
(g) comprises 4 kelurahan (Boyolangu, Giri, Mojopanggung and Penataban) and 2 desa. (h) comprises 4 kelurahan (Bulusan, Gombengsari, Kalipuro and Klatak) and 5 desa.
(i) includes small offshore island of Pulau Tabuan.

== Transportation ==
Banyuwangi Airport at Blimbingsari serves the regency, Banyuwangi (town) city and surrounding area of East Java. Banyuwangi can be reached by road and rail from Surabaya or by ferry from Bali.

== Tourism ==
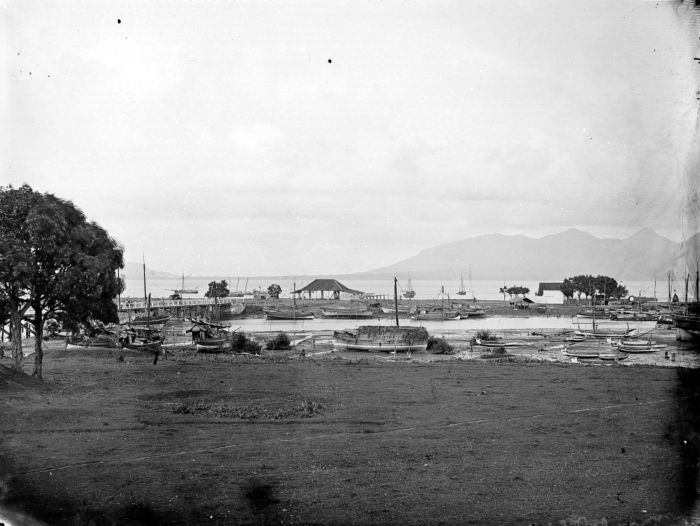
Reede on Bali Street, Banjuwangi, East Java

Many European tourists visiting Bali come to Banyuwangi to surf in Plengkung and dive in Tabuhan Island. Ferries from Bali arrive at the port of Ketapang, some 8 km to the north of Banyuwangi city. Plekung Beach is also known as G-Land or green land have 3 types of waves up to 6 to 8 meters tall.

Banyuwangi International Surfing Competition 2014

This was the second time competition after the 2012 competition. 23–25 May 2014 competition is followed by at least 15 countries in Pantai Pulau Merah (Red Island Beach) which has 4 meters height and 400 meters long of waves.

Diamond Triangle

Diamond Triangle consists of:

- Ijen Crater Nature Tourist Park, we can see tosca lake crater and traditional sulphur mining which the sulphur bunch mobilization still use human to hike and down to the crater.
- Alas Purwo National Park, besides see the animals we can surf at G-Land/Plengkung with Money Trees, Speddy's, Kongs, Twenty-twenty and Tiger Track waves.
- Meru Betiri National Park, Sukamade Turtle Breeding Station regularly releases baby marine turtles to open ocean. 4 of 6 kind of turtles can be found in Indonesia regularly visit Sukamade to put their eggs. Penyu Hijau (Green sea turtle) visit the Sukamade Beach almost everynight, Penyu Lekang (Olive ridley sea turtle) visit in March to June, Penyu Belimbing (Leatherback sea turtle) put the egg every 4 years in June to September and the scare Penyu Sisik (Eremochelys olivacea) very seldom to visit the beach.

Waterfalls

There are a number of waterfalls in Kampung Anyar (New Village), near Kalibendo Plantation, around 15 kilometers from Banyuwangi on the way to Mount Ijen. There are three waterfalls near to each other known as the "Triple Waterfall" to be found 10 minutes walk down the stairs from a parking area. Or about 300 meters along the river, walking uphill, Kethagen Waterfall can be found. The cliff besides the river can reflect sunlight, glittering like diamonds.

== Climate ==
Banyuwangi has a temperate tropical and wet dry climate, similar to Banyuwangi's dry season start from May until October, and the rest is wet season. in 2013, Banyuwangi's highest average temperature is on October with 28.2 °C and lowest average temperature is on April with 24.8 °C

Climate Data For Banyuwangi
Year	2013											
Month	Jan	Feb	Mar	Apr	May	June	July	Aug	Sept	Oct	Nov	Dec
Av. High (Celsius)	31.7	32.3	32	31.7	31.5	30.3	29.6	29.4	30.1	32.5	31.9	31.7
Daily (Celsius)	26.7	27.7	27.4	24.8	27.5	27	26.1	26	26.3	28.2	27.4	27.2
Av. Low (Celsius)	24.1	24.7	24.3	24.8	24.7	24.4	24.6	23.3	23.6	24.7	24.6	24.4
AV. Rainfall (mm)	527.5	100.2	193.1	228.8	97.3	122.8	156	37.3	6.9	0.8	237.6	160.3
Av. Rainy Days	25	14	19	16	16	18	19	8	4	4	21	21

Wind Speed and Humidity
Month	Jan	Feb	Mar	Apr	May	Jun	Jul	Aug	Sep	Oct	Nov	Dec
Wind Speed (Knot)	3.1	3.2	3.2	3.1	3.2	2.6	3	3	2.8	3.1	2.3	2.1
Humidity (%)	86	81	82	83	84	86	82	78	77	75	82	83

Air Pressure and Sunlight Exposure
Month	Jan	Feb	Mar	Apr	May	Jun	Jul	Aug	Sep	Oct	Nov	Dec
Air Pressure (mb)	1008.7	1008.3	1010.2	1004.2	1010.2	1009.2	1011.5	1012.8	1012.8	1012.4	1009.5	1008.8
Sunlight Exposure	45	71	72	67	70	58	60	87	96	99	67	61

== Environment ==
The forest and river in Banyuwangi is well-preserved, says the Indonesia Dragonfly Society because they found 3 dragonfly species which only can live in good environment.

Nevertheless, there are local controversies in the Regency over the impact of gold mining activities in the locality of Tumpang Pitu village. In 2006, the Banywangi regency administration granted a mining licence to one company, PT Indo Multi Niaga, which later transferred the licence to another company. However, the local community had expressed concern about gold mining activities as early as 1997. The issues partly related to the protection of the area around a local Hindu temple, partly relate to environmental matters, and partly related to local community views about the economic and social impact of the mining.

== Gallery ==
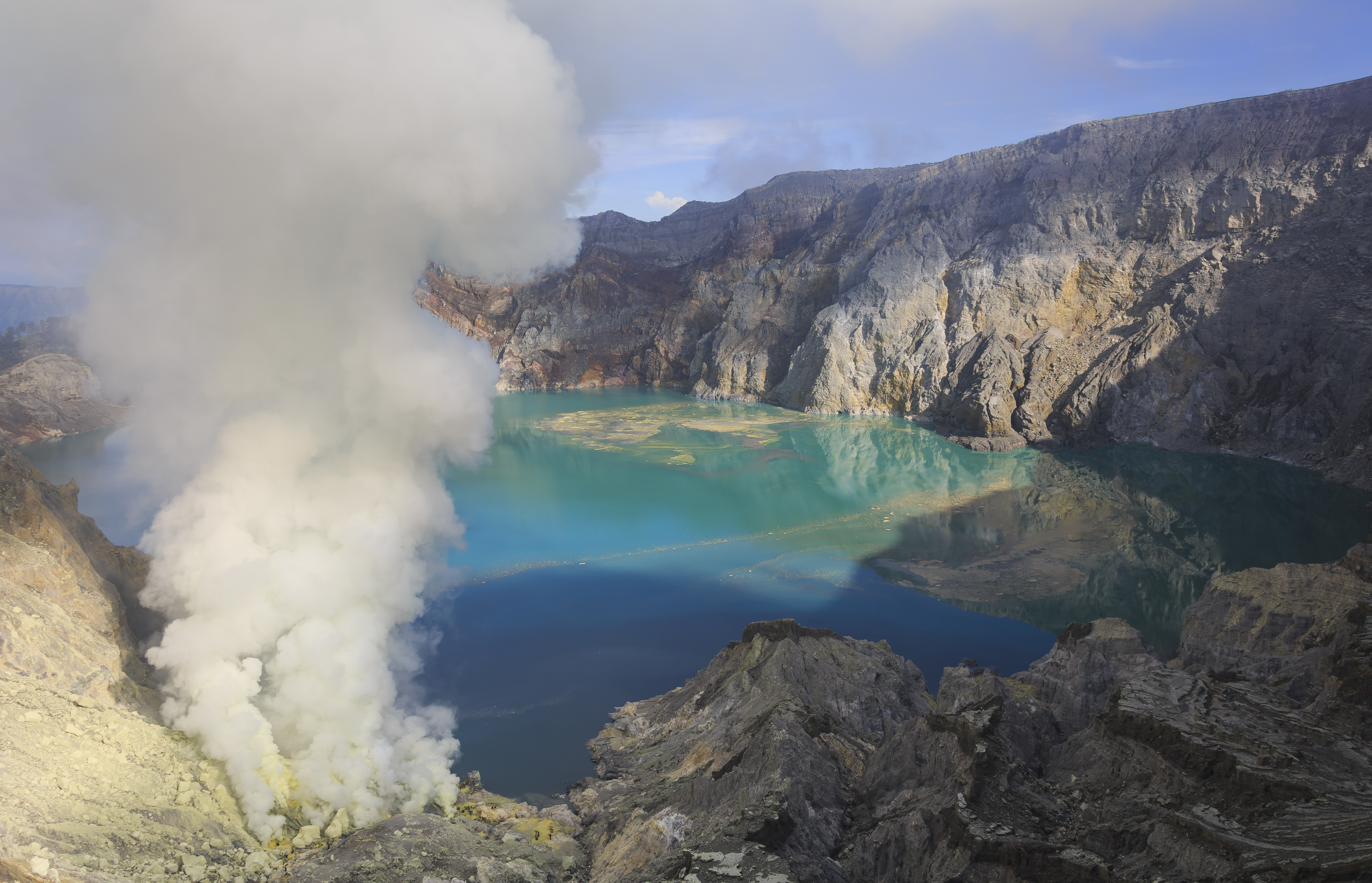
Ijen Crater

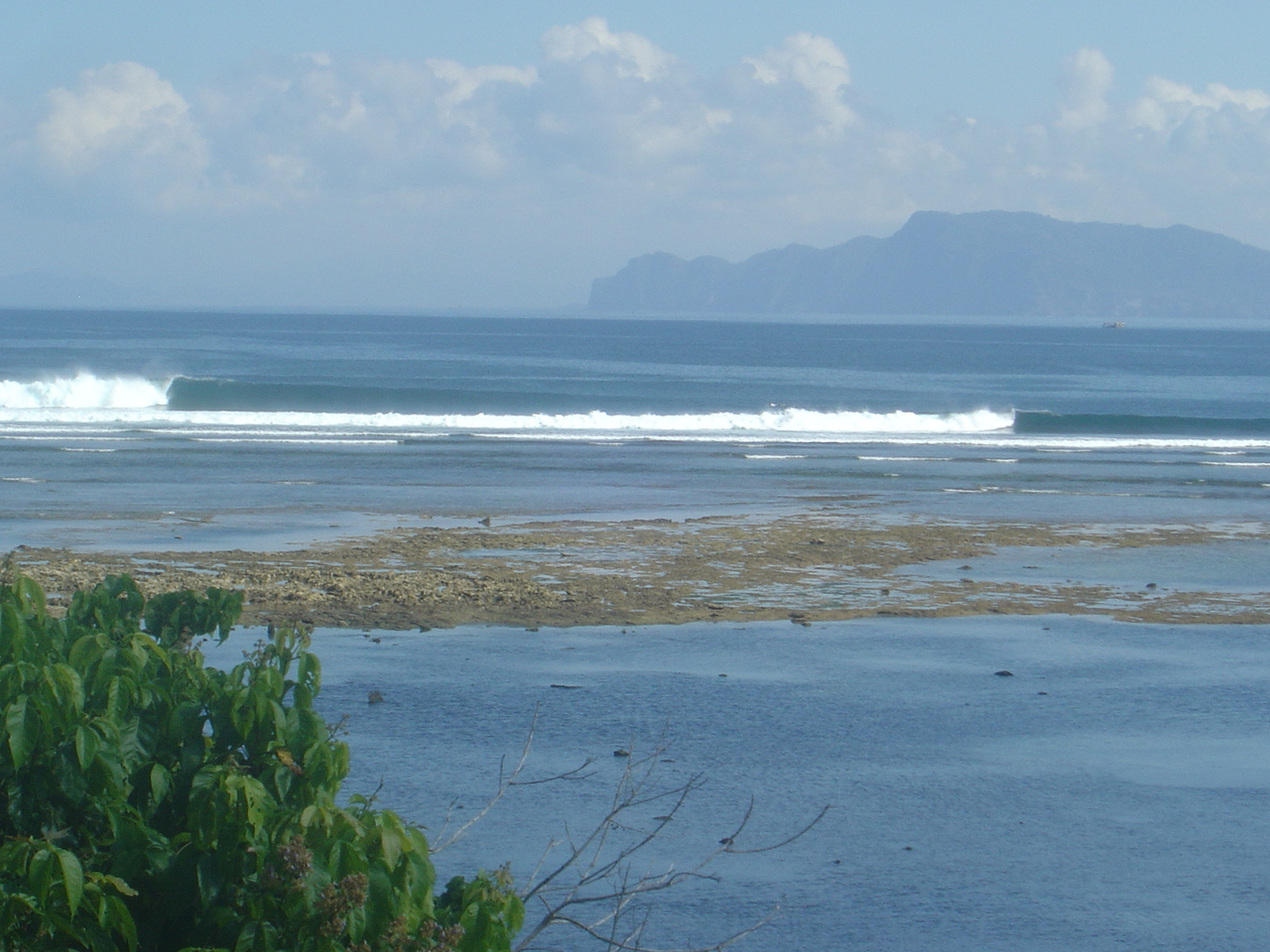
G-land, one of world's most famous surf break spot beach situated on Alas Purwo National Park
