= Banyuwangi (town) =

Town and Capital of Banyuwangi Regency, Indonesia

- Town
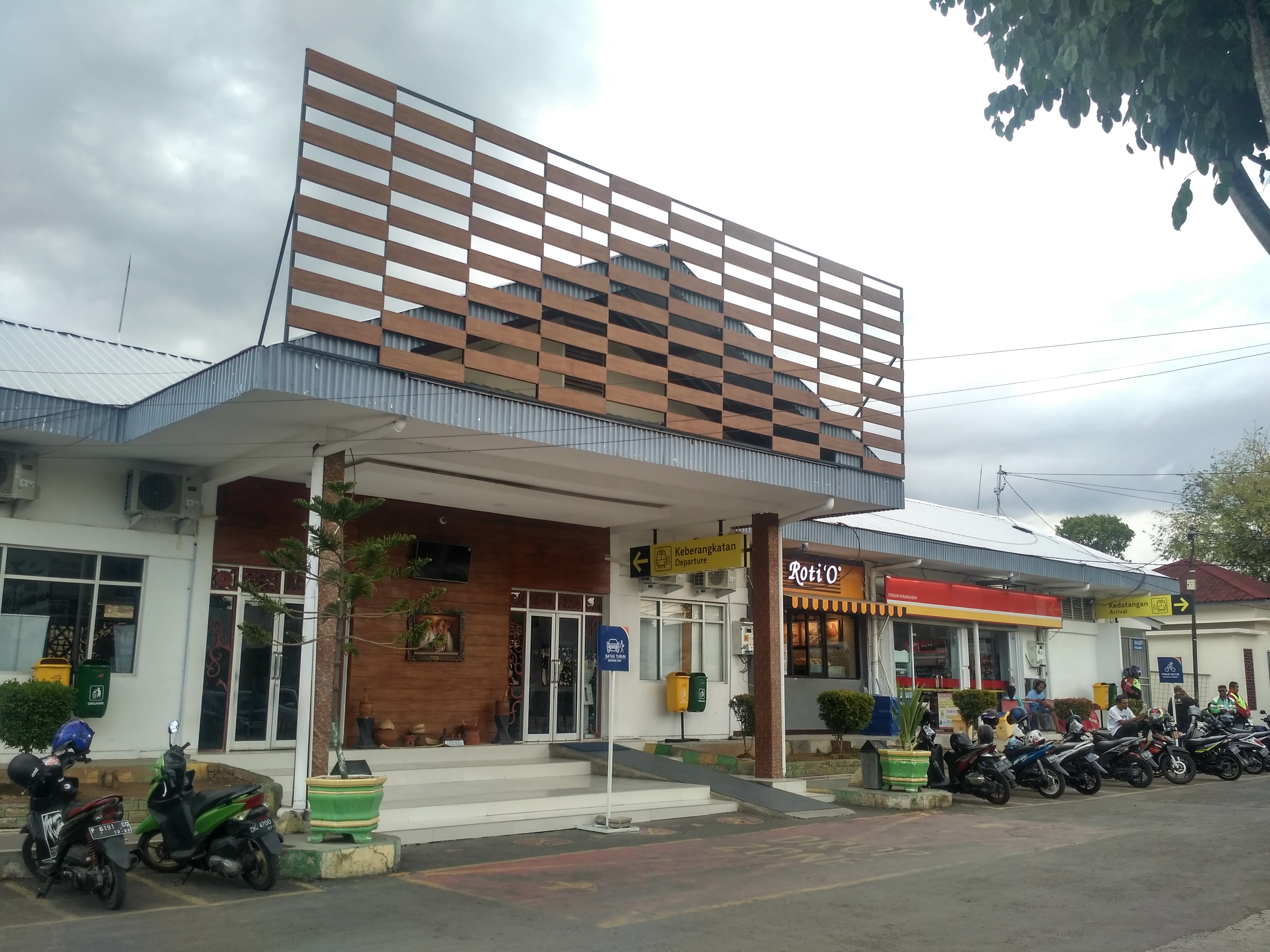
- Banyuwangi Kota railway station

- Location in Banyuwangi Regency, Java and Indonesia Banyuwangi (Java) Banyuwangi (Indonesia)
- Coordinates: 8.2186°S 114.3669°E
- Country: Indonesia
- Region: Java
- Province: East Java
- Regency: Banyuwangi Regency

Area
  - Total: 30.13 km^{2} (11.63 sq mi)

Population (mid 2024 estimate)
  - Total: 121,500
  - Density: 4,033/km^{2} (10,440/sq mi)
- Time zone: UTC+7 (IWST)
- Area code: (+62) 333
- Villages: 18

Banyuwangi, previously known as Banjoewangi, is a large town and an administrative district (kecamatan) which serves as the capital of Banyuwangi Regency at the far eastern end of the island of Java, Indonesia. It had a population of 106,000 at the 2010 census and 117,558 at the 2020 census; the official estimate as of mid-2024 was 121,500. The town extends beyond the district limits to includes substantial parts of neighbouring districts; at the 1990 Census the population of the extended town was 345,861.

The town is also known as city of festival as many festivals are held throughout the year. Banyuwangi Regency is a tourist destination, and additional developments have been proposed to encourage international tourism by building necessary infrastructures.

== Geography ==
Banyuwangi (the name meaning "Fragrant Water", after a mythical river) is built in the centre of the east coast of Java, with the backdrop of the Ijen Plateau to the west, and with fine views across the Bali Strait (Selat Bali) to the island of Bali lying to the east. The principal market area is along the Jalan Susuit Tuban, the street which links the town square (or alun-alun) with the sports stadium (Stadium Diponegoro) a half-kilometre to the southeast.

== History ==
The city was the capital of the Kingdom of Blambangan, the sixteenth-century Hindu kingdom which ruled this eastern tip of Java. Although the rapidly expanding Muslim kingdom of Mataram attacked Blambangan during the early seventeenth century, it managed to survive as the last Hindu kingdom on the island, and it was mostly ignored by the Dutch until the eighteenth century, when they took it over.

Banyuwangi was where the undersea cable connected to Darwin, Australia, met the Australian Overland Telegraph Line in November 1871.

== Transportation ==
Banyuwangi Airport at Blimbingsari serves the Regency (including Banyuwangi town) and the surrounding area in East Java. The town is also served by Ketapang Railway Station, which serves train services in and out of Banyuwangi, including those heading to Surabaya Pasar Turi, Malang, and Pasar Senen. There are also ferry services to Gilimanuk from Ketapang.

== Climate ==
Climate data for Banyuwangi (1991–2020 normals)
Month	Jan	Feb	Mar	Apr	May	Jun	Jul	Aug	Sep	Oct	Nov	Dec	Year
Mean daily maximum °C (°F)	31.9 (89.4)	31.8 (89.2)	32.0 (89.6)	31.9 (89.4)	31.3 (88.3)	30.2 (86.4)	29.5 (85.1)	29.4 (84.9)	30.4 (86.7)	31.9 (89.4)	32.4 (90.3)	32.3 (90.1)	31.2 (88.2)
Daily mean °C (°F)	27.3 (81.1)	27.4 (81.3)	27.7 (81.9)	27.9 (82.2)	27.6 (81.7)	26.7 (80.1)	26.1 (79.0)	25.9 (78.6)	26.6 (79.9)	27.6 (81.7)	28.2 (82.8)	27.7 (81.9)	27.2 (81.0)
Mean daily minimum °C (°F)	24.3 (75.7)	24.4 (75.9)	24.4 (75.9)	24.8 (76.6)	24.8 (76.6)	24.0 (75.2)	23.5 (74.3)	23.3 (73.9)	23.7 (74.7)	24.5 (76.1)	24.9 (76.8)	24.7 (76.5)	24.3 (75.7)
Average precipitation mm (inches)	257.5 (10.14)	199.1 (7.84)	152.8 (6.02)	144.5 (5.69)	96.9 (3.81)	74.1 (2.92)	68.0 (2.68)	45.5 (1.79)	25.7 (1.01)	63.8 (2.51)	101.3 (3.99)	161.2 (6.35)	1,390.4 (54.75)
Average precipitation days	16.6	13.2	10.5	10.1	8.8	6.7	5.5	6.5	3.6	4.8	8.4	14.8	109.5
Mean monthly sunshine hours	149.2	152.3	181.6	200.6	218.0	203.7	210.8	221.8	242.8	249.8	216.8	146.3	2,393.7
Source: Starlings Roost Weather
