= Ijen =

Volcano in East Java

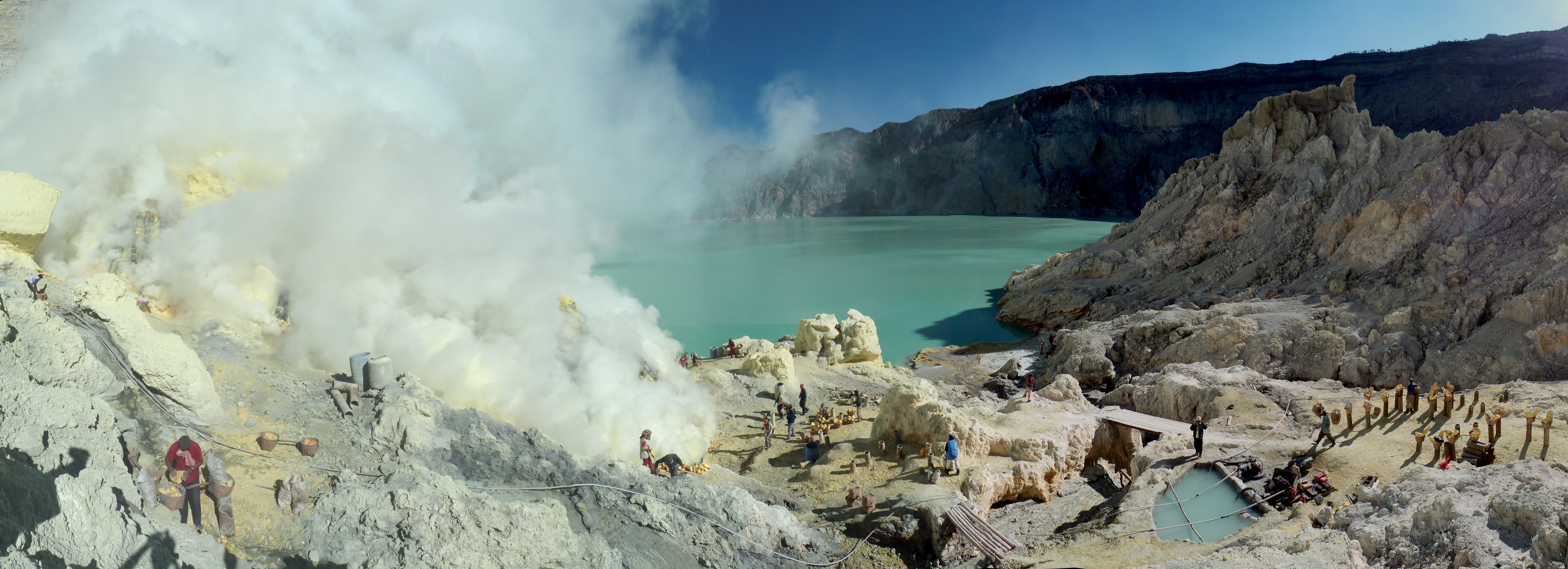
- Ijen volcano

Highest point
- Elevation: 2,769 m (9,085 ft)
- Listing: Spesial Ribu
- Coordinates: 8°3′46″S 114°15′43″E

Geography
- Location within Java
- Location: Border on between Banyuwangi Regency and Bondowoso Regency, East Java, Indonesia

Geology
- Mountain type: Stratovolcano
- Volcanic arc: Sunda Arc
- Last eruption: 1999

3D model of Ijen

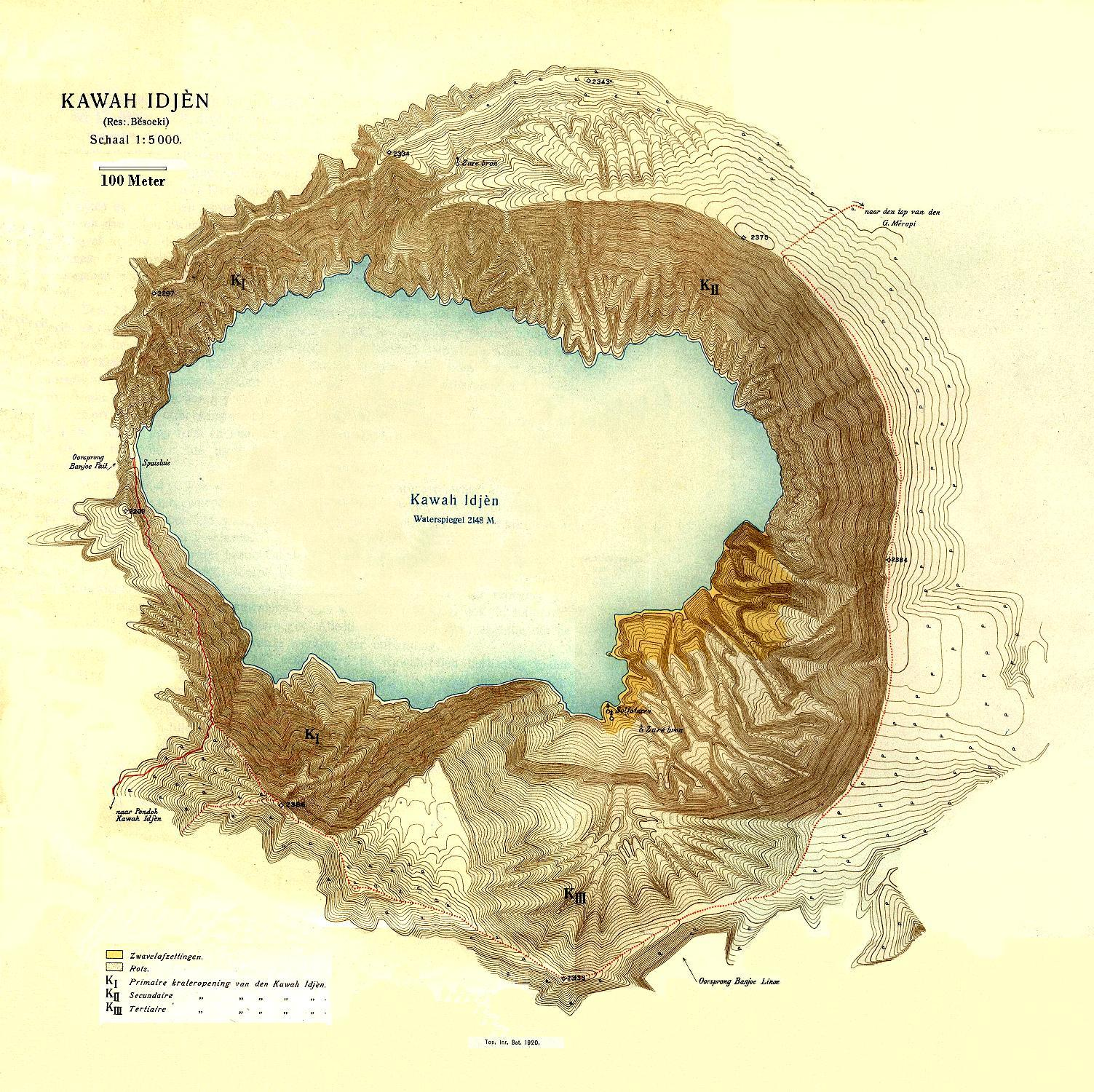
Map of Ijen Crater, where sulfur is mined

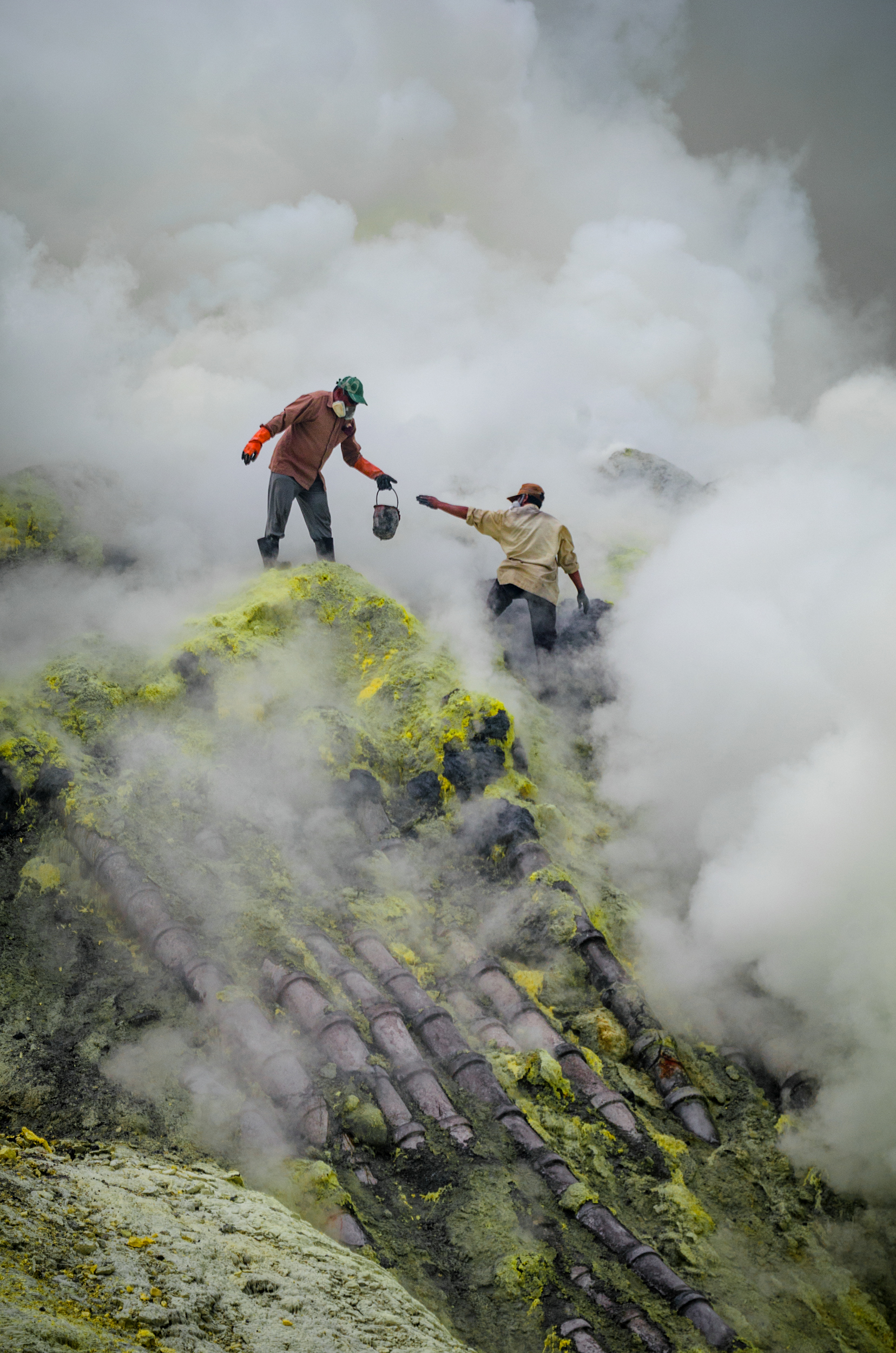
Traditional sulfur mining at Ijen. This image shows the dangerous and rugged conditions the miners face, including toxic smoke and high drops, as well as their lack of protective equipment. The pipes over which they are standing serve to guide sulfur vapors and condense them, thereby facilitating production.

The Ijen volcano complex is a group of composite volcanoes located on the border between Banyuwangi Regency and Bondowoso Regency of East Java, Indonesia. It is known for its blue fire, acidic crater lake, and labour-intensive sulfur mining.

It is inside an eponymous larger caldera Ijen, which is about 20 kilometres (12 mi) wide. The Gunung Merapi stratovolcano is the highest point of that complex. The name "Gunung Merapi" means 'mountain of fire' in the Indonesian language; Mount Merapi in central Java and Marapi in Sumatra have the same etymology.

Ijen Geopark stretches across the entire regency which is specifically in the Mount Ijen area, Pulau Merah Beach, and Alas Purwo National Park. It has various geological, biological, and cultural sites. It became part of UNESCO Global Geoparks in 2023.

West of Gunung Merapi is the Ijen volcano, which has a one-kilometre-wide (0.62 mi) turquoise-coloured acidic crater lake. The lake is the site of a labour-intensive sulfur mining operation, in which sulfur-laden baskets are carried by hand from the crater floor. The work is paid well considering the cost of living in the area, but is very onerous. Workers earn around US$13 per day and, once out of the crater, still need to carry their loads of sulfur chunks about three kilometers to the nearby Paltuding Valley to get paid.

Many other post-caldera cones and craters are located within the caldera or along its rim. The largest concentration of post-caldera cones runs east–west across the southern side of the caldera. The active crater at Kawah Ijen has a diameter of 722 metres (2,369 ft) and a surface area of 0.41 square kilometres (0.16 sq mi). It is 200 metres (660 ft) deep and has a volume of 36 cubic hectometres (29,000 acre⋅ft).

The lake is recognised as the largest highly acidic crater lake in the world. It is also a source for the river Banyupahit, resulting in highly acidic and metal-enriched river water which has a significant detrimental effect on the downstream river ecosystem. During a scientific expedition in 2001, the pH of the lake was measured at <0.3. On 14–15 July 2008, explorer George Kourounis took a small rubber boat out onto the acid lake to measure its acidity. The pH of the water at the lake's edges was measured to be 0.5 and in the middle of the lake 0.13 due to a high concentration of sulfuric acid.

== Blue fire crater ==
Since National Geographic mentioned the electric-blue flame of Ijen, tourist numbers have increased. The phenomenon has long been known, but midnight hiking tours are a more recent offering. A two-hour hike is required to reach the rim of the crater, followed by a 45-minute hike down to the bank of the crater.

The blue fire is created by ignited sulfuric gas, which emerges from cracks at temperatures up to 600 °C (1,112 °F). The flames can be up to five meters (16 feet) high; some of the gas condenses to liquid and is still ignited.

Ijen is the largest blue flame area in the world. Local people refer to it as Api Biru ('Blue Fire'). The other location at which blue fire can be seen is in Dallol Mountain, Ethiopia.

== Sulfur mining at Ijen ==
An active vent at the edge of the lake is a source of elemental sulfur and supports a mining operation. Escaping volcanic gases are channeled through a network of ceramic pipes, resulting in condensation of molten sulfur.

The sulfur, which is deep red when molten, pours slowly from the ends of these pipes and pools on the ground, turning bright yellow as it cools. The miners break the cooled material into large pieces and carry it away in baskets. Miners carry loads ranging from 75 to 90 kilograms (165 to 198 lb) up 300 metres (980 ft) to the crater rim, with a gradient of 45 to 60 degrees, and then 3 kilometres (1.9 miles) down the mountain for weighing. Most miners make this journey twice a day.

A nearby sulfur refinery pays the miners by the weight of sulfur transported; as of September 2010, the typical daily earnings were equivalent to approximately $13 US. The miners often receive insufficient protection while working around the volcano and complain of numerous respiratory afflictions. There are 200 miners, who extract 14 tons per day — about 20% of the continuous daily deposit.

== Media ==
Ijen and its sulfur mining was featured in the 1991 IMAX film Ring of Fire, and as a topic on the 5th episode of the BBC television documentary Human Planet.

In the documentary film War Photographer, journalist James Nachtwey visits Ijen and struggles with noxious fumes while trying to photograph workers. Michael Glawogger's film Workingman's Death is about sulfur workers.

== Gallery ==
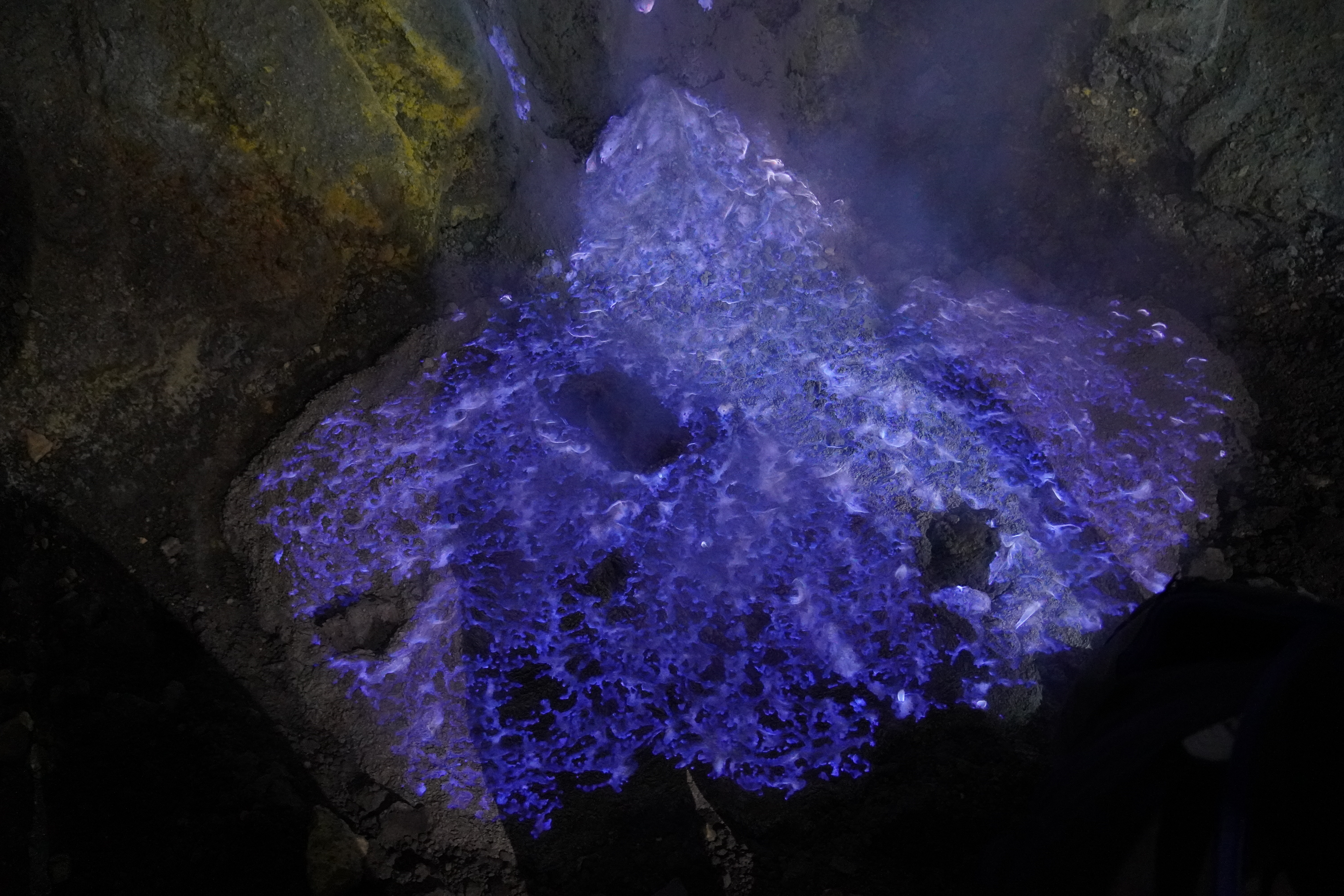
Blue flames caused by the burning of sulfur in the Ijen caldera

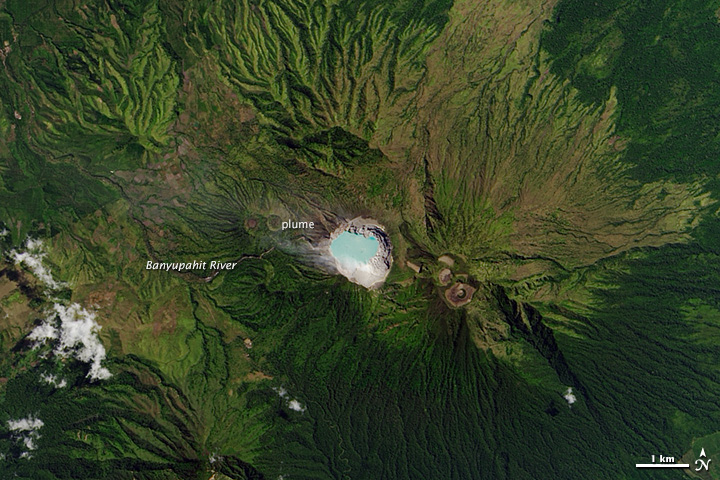
Kawah Ijen volcano and crater lake, Java, viewed from Landsat 8

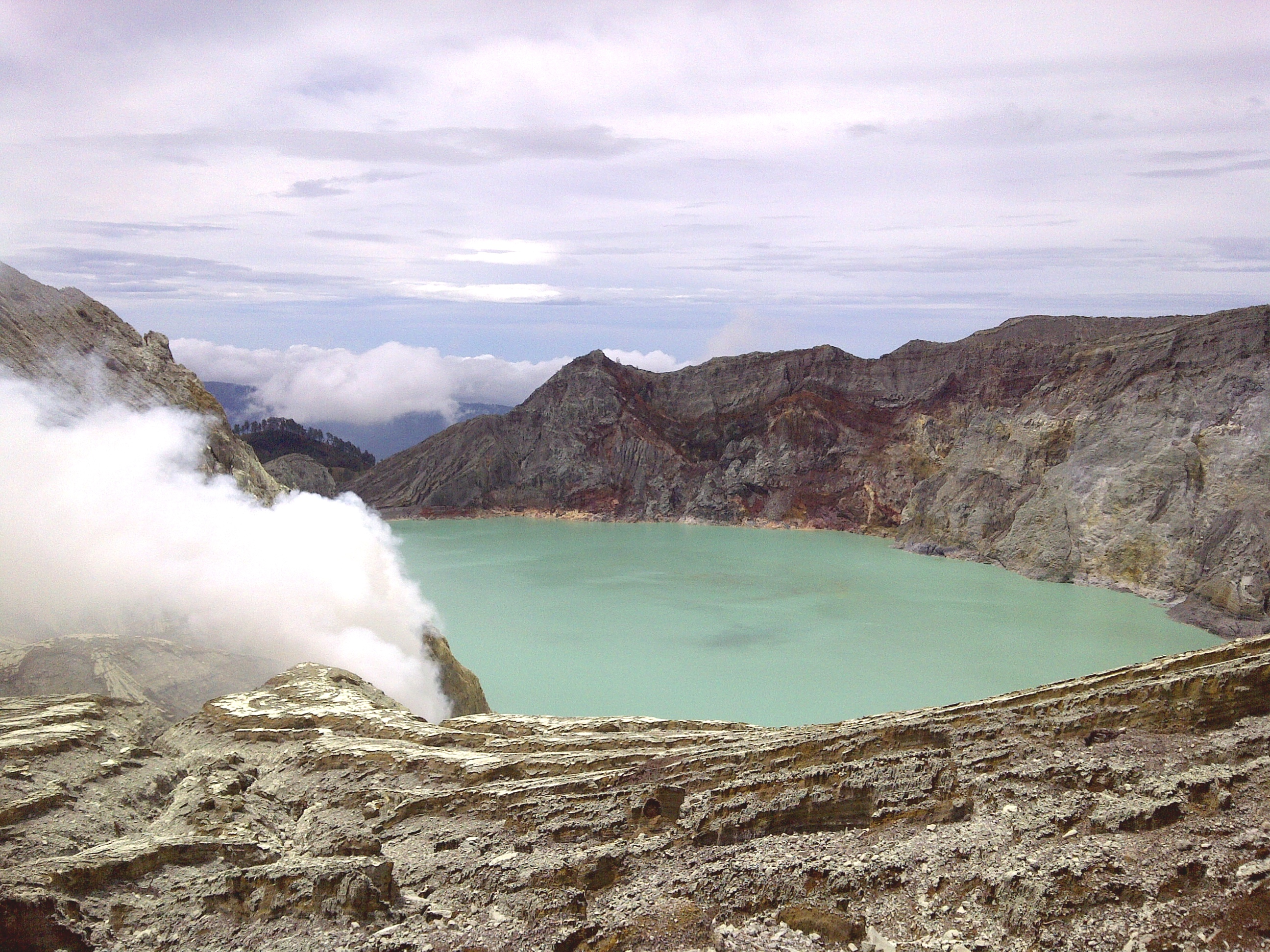
The sulfuric lake of Kawah Ijen Mountain's cauldron, Indonesia

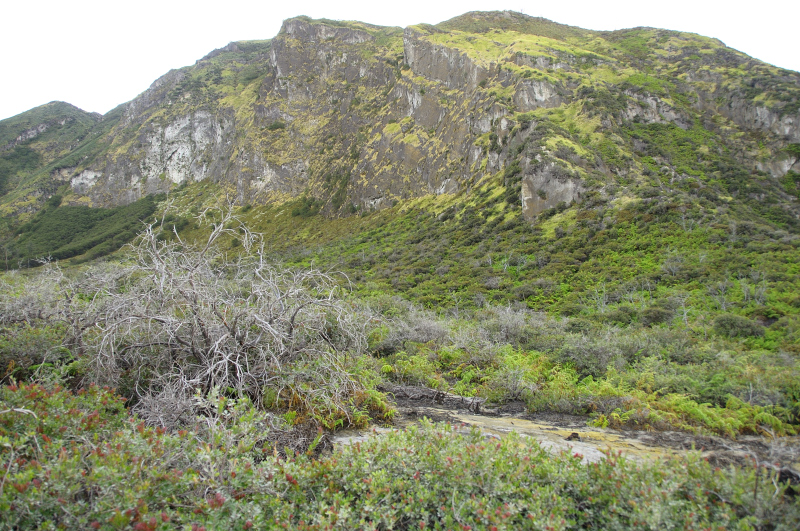
Mt. Merapi, Ijen

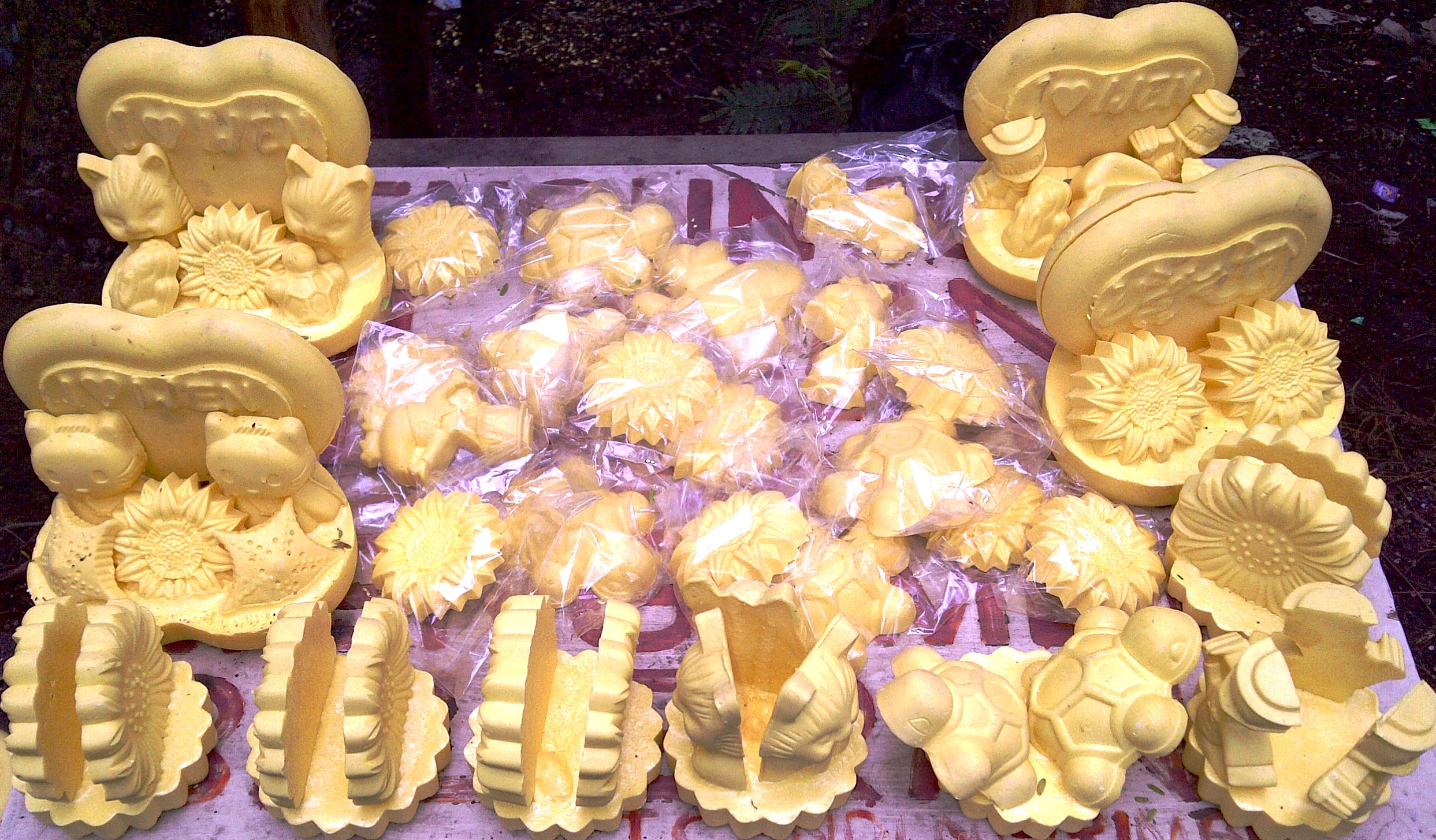
Sulfur ornaments from Ijen mines

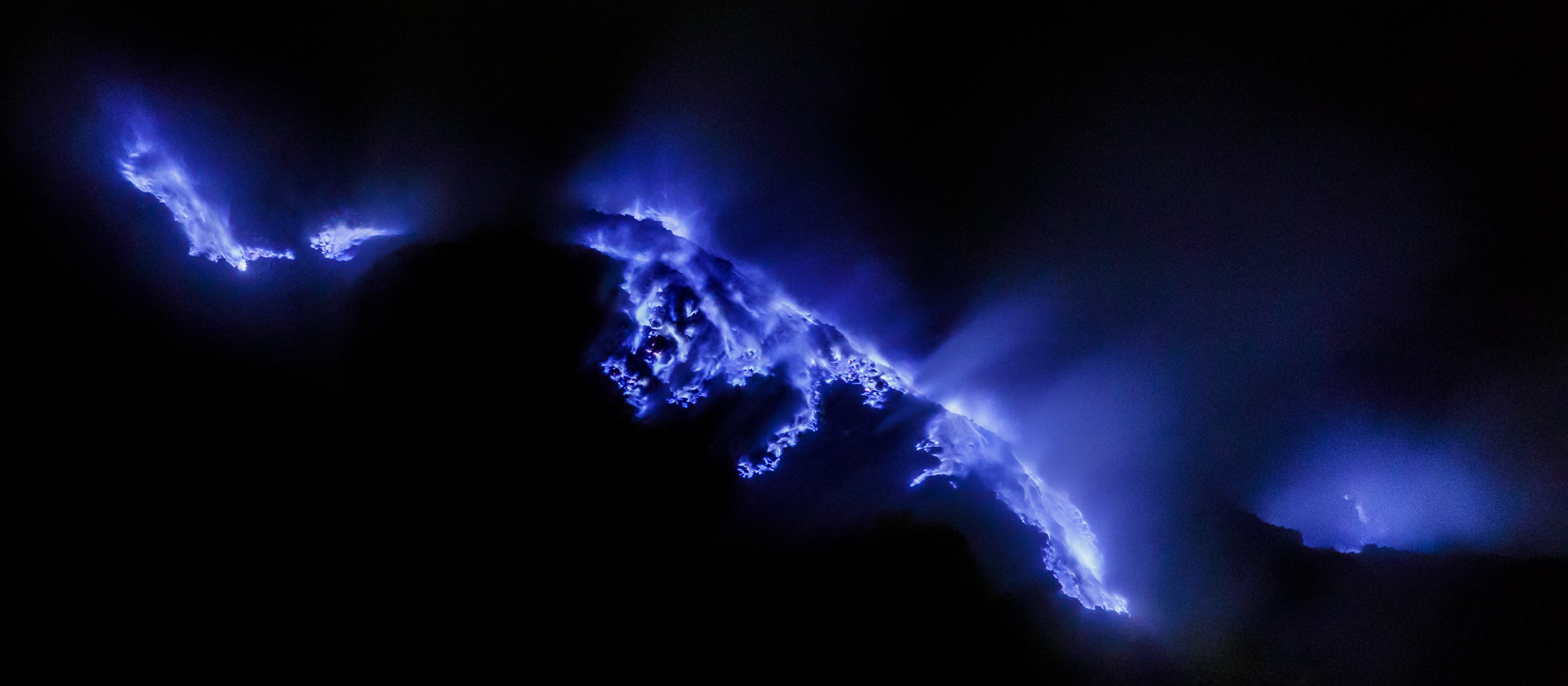
The "blue lava" of Kawah Ijen

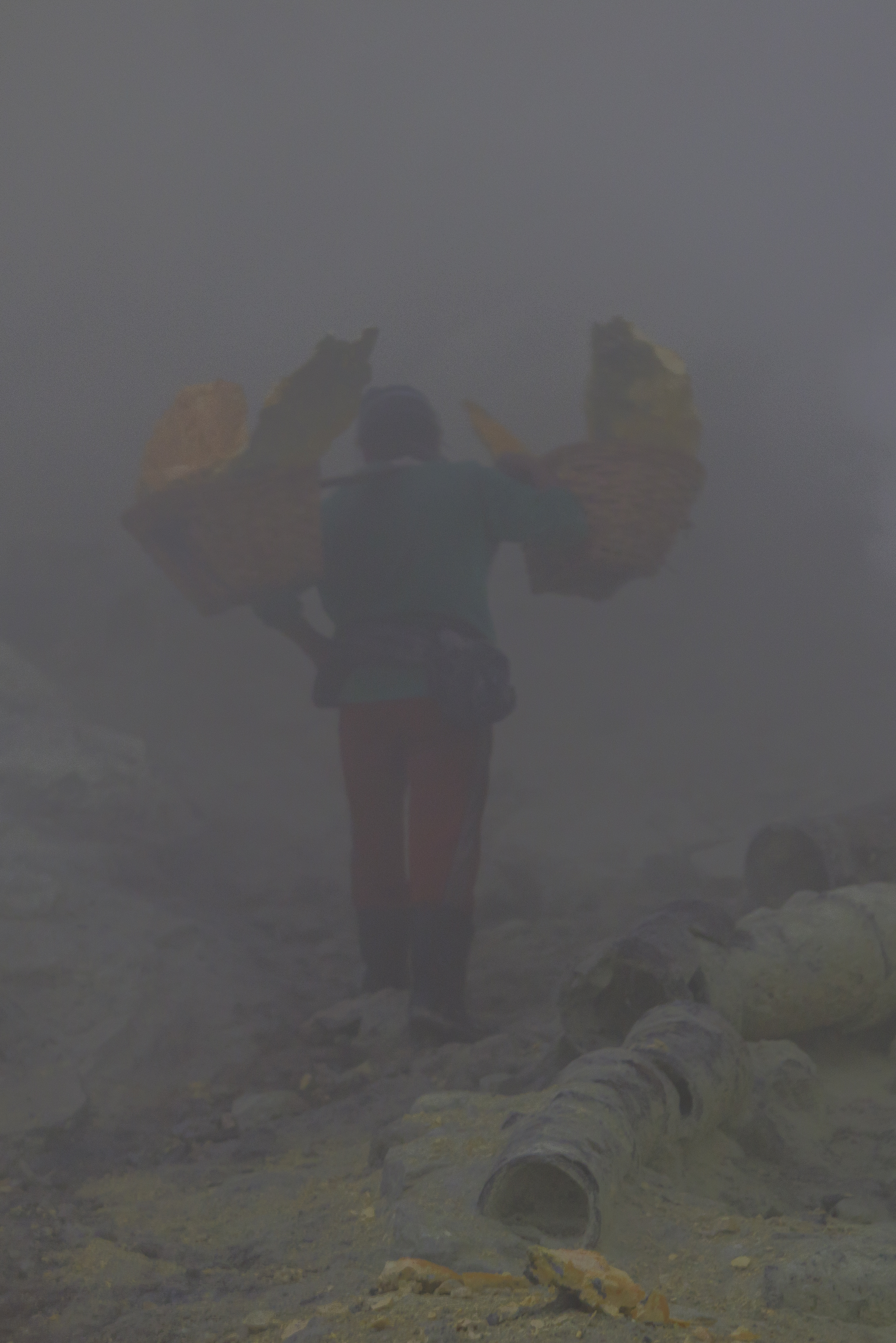
Kawah Ijen sulfur miner

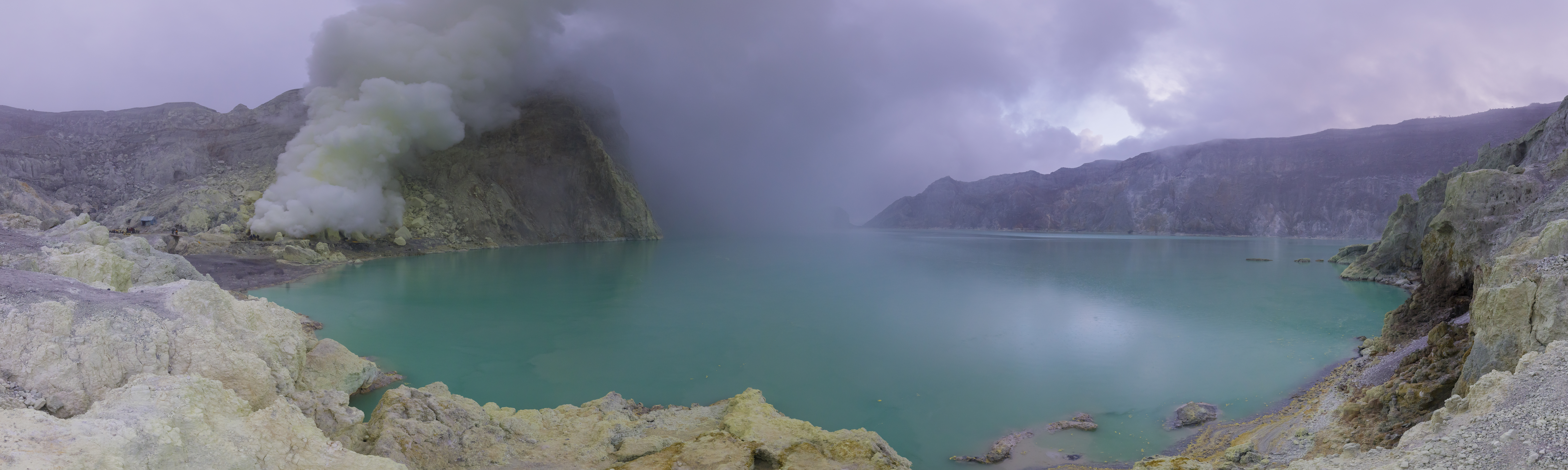
Kawah Ijen

== See also ==
- Ijen Express
- List of volcanoes in Indonesia
- Mazuku
