= Regent of Banyuwangi =

- Bupati Banyuwangi
- Coat of arms of Banyuwangi Regency

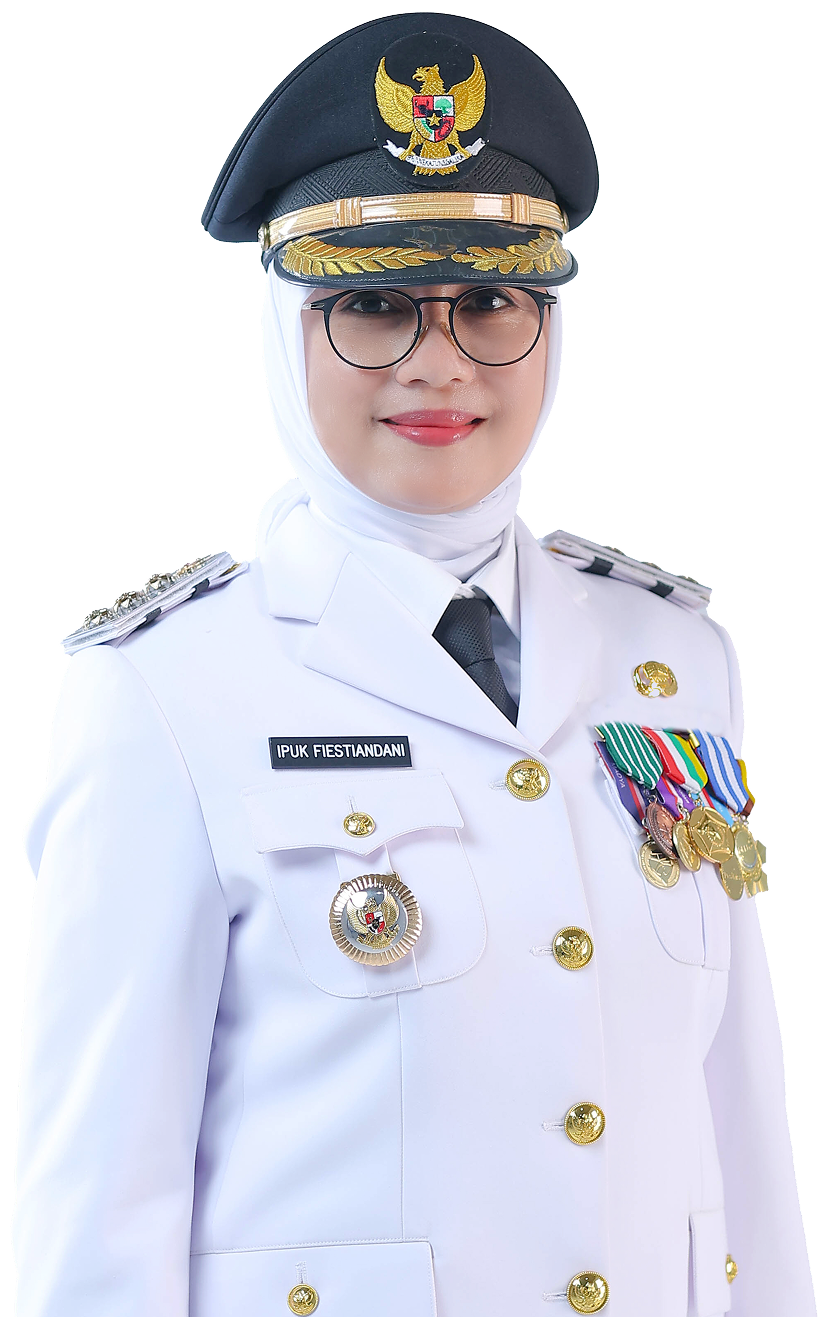
- Incumbent; Ipuk Fiestiandani since 26 February 2021
- Term length: 5 years
- Inaugural holder: Temenggung Wiroguno I alias Mas Alit
- Formation: 1771
- Website: banyuwangikab.go.id

The Regent of Banyuwangi is the head of the second-level region who holds the government in Banyuwangi Regency together with the Vice Regent and 50 members of the Banyuwangi Regency Regional House of Representatives. The regent and vice regent of Banyuwangi are elected through general elections held every 5 years. The first regent of Banyuwangi was Temenggung Wiroguno I, who governed the city during the Dutch colonisation period from 1773 to 1782.

== List ==
The following is a list of the names of the regents of Banyuwangi from time to time.

Num.	Portrait	Mayor	Beginning of office	End of Term	Political Party / Faction	Period	Note.	Vice mayor
1		Temenggung Wiroguno I (alias Mas Alit)	1773	1782	Independent	1		N/A
2		Temenggung Wiroguno II (alias Mas Talib)	1782	1818	Independent	2		N/A
3		Temenggung Surenggrono	1818	1832	Independent	3		N/A
4		R.T. Wiroadinegoro	4 April 1832	1867	Independent	4		N/A
5		R.T. Pringgokoesoemo	16 November 1867	28 November 1880	Independent	5	Rapture, Obituary	N/A
6		R.M.T.A. Soegondo	31 January 1881	31 October 1887	Independent	6	Appointment, Transfer news	N/A
7		R.T. Astrokoesoemo	29 February 1888	1889	Independent	7	Appointment	N/A
8		R.T.A. Soeringrono	23 February 1889	October 1894	Independent	8	Appointment, Mutation	N/A
9		R.T.A. Koesoemonegoro	9 May 1895	11 October 1911	Independent	9	Rapture, Obituary	N/A
10		R.T. Notodiningrat	6 June 1913	7 November 1918	Independent	10	Short profile	N/A
11		R.A.A. Mohamad Notoadisoerjo	12 July 1919	30 June 1933	Independent	11	Appointment News, Retirement News	N/A
12		R.T. Moertadjab Sosroadiningrat	19 May 1934	22 May 1938	Independent	12	Death News	N/A
13		R.T. Achmad Rastiko	10 March 1939	1942	Independent	13	Appointment News	N/A
14		R. Oesman Soemodinoto	1942	1947	Independent	14		N/A
15		R. Ahmad Kusumo Negoro	1947	1949	Independent	15		N/A
16		R. Moch. Sachrawisetio Abiwinoto	1949	1949	Independent	16		N/A
17		Sukarbi	1949	1950	Independent	17		N/A
(14)		R. Oesman Soemodinoto	1950	1955	Independent	18		N/A
18		Soegito Noto Soegito	1955	1965	Independent	19		N/A
18		Soegito Noto Soegito	1955	1965	Independent	20		N/A
19		Soewarso Kanapi; S.H.	1965	1966	Independent	21	(Note: Suspected of being involved in the PKI)	N/A
20		Letkol (Purn.); Djoko Supaat Slamet	1966	1978	ABRI–AD	22		N/A
21		Soesilo Suharto; S.H.	1978	1983	Independent	23		N/A
22		S. Djoko Wasito	1983	1988	Independent	24		N/A
23		Harwin Wasisto	1988	1991	Independent	25		N/A
24		Kol Pol. (Purn) H. T. Purnomo Sidik	1991	2000	ABRI–AD	26		N/A
24		Kol Pol. (Purn) H. T. Purnomo Sidik	1991	2000	ABRI–AD	27		N/A
25		Ir. H. Samsul Hadi	2000	2005	Independent	28		Abdul Kadir
26		Dr. Ratna Ani Lestari; S.E., M.M	2005	2010	PDI-P	29 (2005)		Yusuf Nur Iskandar
27		Abdullah Azwar Anas; S.Pd., S.S.	21 October 2010	21 October 2015	PKB	30 (2010)		Yusuf Widyatmoko
–		Drs. Zarkasi; M.Si. (Acting)	22 October 2015	17 February 2016	Independent	–		N/A
(27)		H. Abdullah Azwar Anas; S.Pd., S.S., M.Si.	17 February 2016	17 February 2021	PDI-P	31 (2015)		Yusuf Widyatmoko
–		Ir. H. Mujiono; M.S. (Daily Executive)	17 February 2021	26 February 2021	Independent	–		N/A
28		Hj. Ipuk Fiestiandani; S.Pd., M.KP.	26 February 2021	24 September 2024	PDI-P	32 (2020)		Sugirah
–		H. Sugirah; S.Pd., M.Si. (Acting Officer)	25 September 2024	23 November 2024	PDI-P	32 (2020)	(Note: Incumbent Regent on leave to campaign 2024 Banyuwangi regency election)	N/A
(28)		Hj. Ipuk Fiestiandani; S.Pd., M.KP.	24 November 2024	19 February 2025	PDI-P	32 (2020)		Sugirah
(28)		Hj. Ipuk Fiestiandani; S.Pd., M.KP.	20 February 2025	Incumbent	PDI-P	33 (2024)		Mujiono

== See also ==
- Banyuwangi Regency
- List of incumbent regional heads and deputy regional heads in East Java
