= Ipuk Fiestiandani =

Indonesian politician (born 1974)

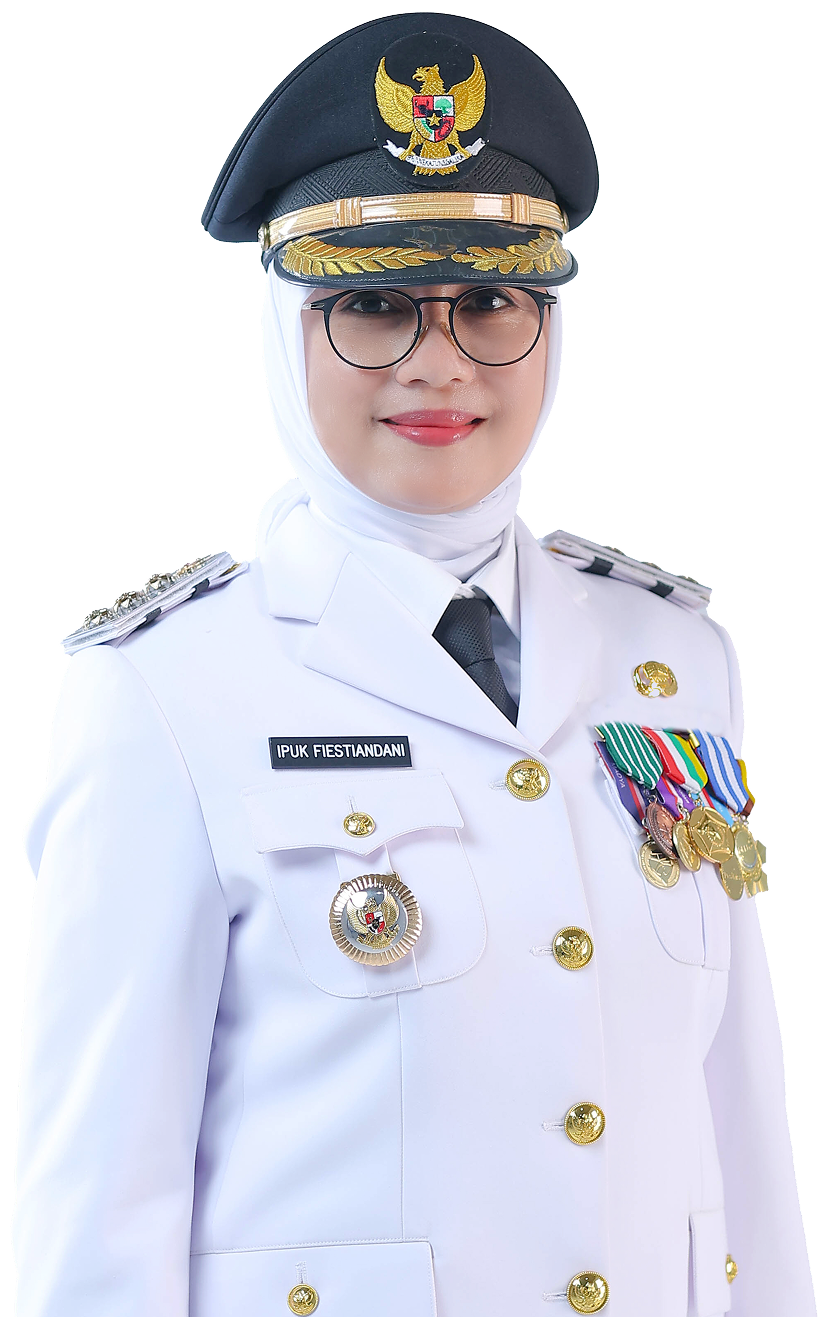
- Fiestiandani in 2025

28th Regent of Banyuwangi
- Incumbent
- Assumed office 26 February 2021
- Preceded by: Abdullah Azwar Anas

Personal details
- Born: 10 September 1974 (age 51) Magelang, Central Java, Indonesia

Ipuk Fiestiandani (born 10 September 1974) is an Indonesian politician who has served as the regent of Banyuwangi Regency, East Java since 2021. She succeeded her husband, Abdullah Azwar Anas, who had previously served as regent between 2010 and 2020.

== Life and career ==
Ipuk Fiestiandani was born on 10 September 1974 in Magelang, Central Java. Her father was Slamet Sutojo. As a child, she moved to Jakarta and studied at public schools there, graduated from Central Jakarta's SMA Negeri 68 Jakarta in 1992. In 1999, she graduated from the Jakarta Institute of Teaching and Education.

Fiestiandani's husband Abdullah Azwar Anas, with whom she has a son, was elected as regent of Banyuwangi Regency in East Java in 2010, and to a second term in 2015. During Anas' tenure, Fiestiandani led several women's organizations within the regency.

In 2020, upon the end of Anas' second term, Fiestiandani ran in the regency election against her husband's vice-regent Yusuf Widyatmoko. During the campaign, the two candidates differed between prioritizing tourism and agriculture in Banyuwangi, with Widyatmoko favoring more investment in agriculture and Fiestiandani favoring tourism development. Fiestiandani, who received the support of the Indonesian Democratic Party of Struggle (PDI-P) in her candidacy, secured 438,847 votes in the election (52.44%) and won. She was the second woman to become regent in Banyuwangi, after Ratna Ani Lestari in 2005.

As regent, Fiestiandani established a program where she located her office for one day in a week within a village in Banyuwangi instead of from her regency office. According to Fiestiandani, by the end of her first term in 2024 this had been done for around half of Banyuwangi's 189 villages. She was reelected for a second term in 2024, winning 404,366 votes (52.11%).
