= Hasto Kristiyanto =

Indonesian politician (born 1966)

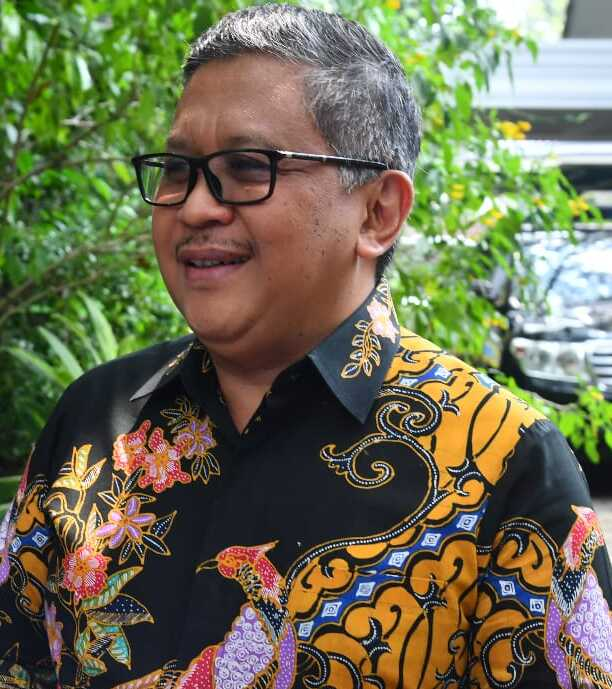
- Hasto in 2023

Secretary-General of the Indonesian Democratic Party of Struggle
- Incumbent
- Assumed office 14 August 2025
- Preceded by: Megawati Sukarnoputri (acting)
- In office 26 October 2014 – 2 August 2025
- Preceded by: Tjahjo Kumolo
- Succeeded by: Megawati Sukarnoputri (acting)

Member of the House of Representatives
- In office 1 October 2004 – 30 September 2009
- Constituency: East Java VII

Personal details
- Born: 7 July 1966 (age 60) Yogyakarta, Special Region of Yogyakarta, Indonesia
- Party: PDI-P
- Spouse: Maria Stefani Ekowati
- Children: 2

Hasto Kristiyanto (born 7 July 1966) is an Indonesian politician who serves as the Secretary-General of the Indonesian Democratic Party of Struggle (PDI-P). He first served as Secretary-General in 2014 and was reappointed to the position for the 2025–2030 term. His reappointment was made by PDI-P Chairwoman Megawati Soekarnoputri following the party's 6th Congress. Previously, Hasto served as a member of the House of Representatives of Indonesia from 2004 to 2009.

== Early life and career ==
Hasto Kristiyanto was born in Yogyakarta on 7 July 1966 into a Catholic family. He studied at SMA Kolese de Britto Yogyakarta where he became interested in politics, often reading political books. Hasto continued his studies and completed a degree in engineering from Gadjah Mada University. During his university years, Hasto became an activist and the president of the engineering faculty's student senate. After graduating in 1991, Hasto worked as the project manager for the marketing department of PT Rekayasa Industri.

== House of Representatives ==
He became a member of the Indonesian Democratic Party of Struggle (PDI-P) and was elected a member of the House of Representatives in the 2004 Indonesian legislative election. His constituency — the East Java VII electoral district — encompassed the regencies of Ngawi, Magetan, Ponorogo, and Pacitan. As a legislator, he was placed on the sixth commission of the House which handled trade, industry, and investment. During his time in the commission, Hasto rejected a bill to transform Batam into a free trade zone, though it passed anyway.

== Party secretary-general ==
In the 2009 Indonesian legislative election, he ran for re-election but failed to keep his seat. He remained active in party politics and was appointed as the spokesperson coordinator for the Joko Widodo 2014 presidential campaign. President-elect Joko Widodo appointed Hasto as a deputy for the presidential transition. Following Tjahjo Kumolo's appointment as minister of home affairs, Chairwoman Megawati Sukarnoputri replaced him with Hasto as PDI-P's secretary-general. He has remained as secretary-general since 2014.

== Graft investigation ==
On 23 December 2024, the Corruption Eradication Commission (KPK) named Hasto as a suspect in a graft case. He was alleged to have helped Harun Masiku, a PDI-P politician, bribe Wahyu Setiawan, then one of the commissioners of the General Elections Commission, in exchange for a seat in the House. Hasto was also accused of helping Harun elude the authorities. The case has been fraught with allegations of political retaliation and discriminatory prosecution, as Hasto has become a critic of President Joko Widodo's alleged interference in the 2024 Indonesian presidential election and the new KPK leadership had been handpicked by Jokowi. After his arrest, Hasto attempted to bring down Jokowi with him, as he urged the KPK to also look into Jokowi and his family for potential corruption. Hasto's arrest has also strained the relationship between President Prabowo Subianto and Megawati.

=== Legal clemency ===
Following a lengthy legal process, Hasto was found guilty and sentenced to three and a half years of prison by the Jakarta Corruption Court. However, President Prabowo submitted a letter to the House requesting legal clemency for Hasto, former trade minister Thomas Lembong, and more than 1,000 other convicts. The proposal was then approved by the House and announced by Deputy Speaker Sufmi Dasco Ahmad and Law Minister Supratman Andi Agtas on 31 July 2025, with the latter citing "national interest, political unity and the individuals’ past contributions" as the reasons for the request. The move had been arranged behind closed doors and taken many by surprise. The move was widely seen as an effort to curb dissent and stabilize President Prabowo's first term in office. The decision meant that Hasto's will have his conviction wiped clean. The decision also came amidst rising political tensions between Prabowo and Jokowi, with both Hasto and Thomas being critics of Jokowi. On 2 August 2025, he left his position as PDI-P secretary-general following the party's congress in Bali, with Chairwoman Megawati serving as acting secretary-general.

== Personal life ==
He is married to Maria Stefani Ekowati and they have 2 children together.
