= Banyuwangi Airport =

Airport in Banyuwangi, Java, Indonesia

Banyuwangi Airport Bandar Udara Banyuwangi
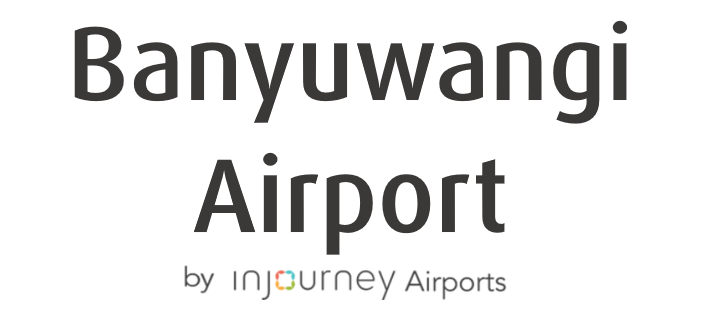

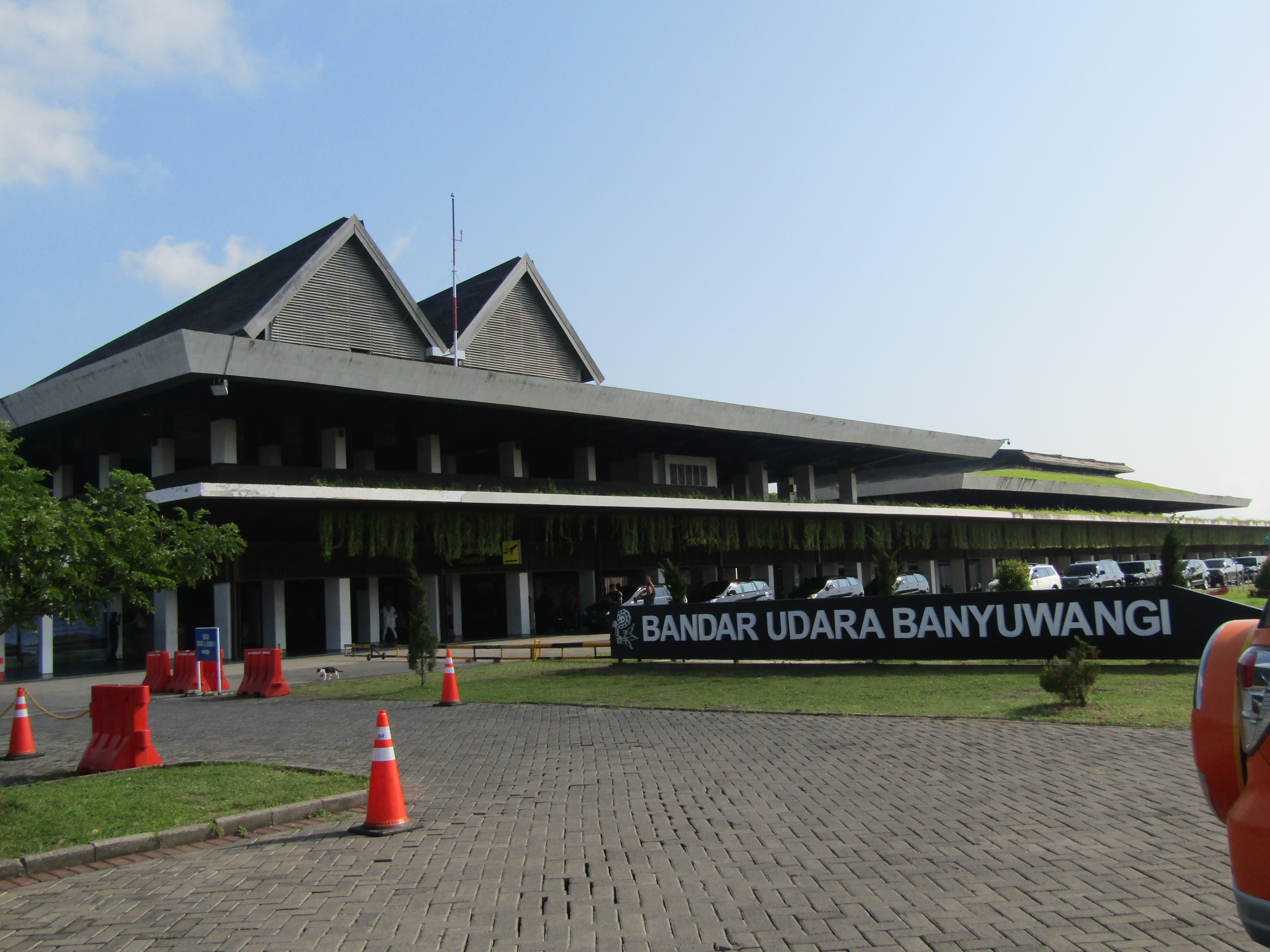
- IATA: BWX; ICAO: WADY

Summary
- Airport type: Public
- Owner: Government of Indonesia
- Operator: InJourney Airports
- Serves: Banyuwangi
- Location: Blimbingsari, Banyuwangi Regency, East Java, Java, Indonesia
- Built: 2010; 16 years ago
- Time zone: WIB (UTC+07:00)
- Elevation AMSL: 37.8 m (124 ft)
- Coordinates: 08°18′36″S 114°20′25″E

Map
- Location in Banyuwangi Regency Location in Java Location in Indonesia

Runways
Direction	Length		Surface
Direction	m	ft	Surface
08/26	2,450	8,038	Asphalt

Statistics (2024)
- Passengers: 155,624 (▲3.6%)
- Cargo (tonnes): 140 (▲28.4%)
- Aircraft movements: 5,797 (▲157.75%)
- Source: DGCA

Banyuwangi Airport (IATA: BWX, ICAO: WADY) (Note: Formerly known by airport code DQJ), formerly Blimbingsari Airport, is a domestic airport serving the town of Banyuwangi, the capital of Banyuwangi Regency in East Java, Indonesia. It is located approximately 12 km (7.5 miles) from the town center. The airport serves as one of the main points of entry to Banyuwangi, the eastern part of East Java, and the western region of Bali. It also provides access to nearby tourist destinations such as the Ijen volcano complex and Alas Purwo National Park. Currently, the airport operates only two routes: Jakarta, the capital of Indonesia, and Surabaya, the provincial capital of East Java. It previously offered flights to Denpasar as well as international services to Kuala Lumpur, Malaysia.

In addition to serving as a commercial airport, the airport also hosts several pilot training schools, including the Banyuwangi Indonesian Pilot Flight Academy (Akademi Penerbang Indonesia Banyuwangi), commonly known as API Banyuwangi, which is operated by the Ministry of Transportation, as well as the Mandiri Utama Flight Academy (MUFA) and the Bali International Flight Academy (BIFA).

== History ==
=== Construction and early history ===
Before the construction of the current Banyuwangi Airport, the region had an aircraft landing site located in Glenmore District. Situated in the middle of a plantation, the site featured a former runway built for light aircraft—small planes commonly used for spraying pesticides on rice fields. The runway was constructed in the 1970s during the tenure of Regent Djoko Supaat Slamet. The site was initially intended to be developed into Banyuwangi's official airport. However, the plan was never realized. Its cancellation was partly attributed to the 1998 East Java ninja scare, a period of social unrest and violence. At the time, both materials and funding for the airport project had already been prepared. Additionally, it was later concluded that the topography of Glenmore was unsuitable for airport development, as the area lies at the foot of Mount Raung.

Subsequently, through a decision by the Ministry of Transportation, a new site for the airport was designated in Blimbingsari village, which at the time was still part of Rogojampi District. Therefore, the airport was initially known as Blimbingsari Airport. The construction of the airport at this new location took several years due to prolonged land acquisition processes. During this land acquisition phase, two Banyuwangi regents were implicated in corruption cases involving inflated land compensation prices, resulting in a total state loss of Rp 40.99 billion. The two officials were Regent Samsul Hadi, responsible for losses amounting to Rp 21.23 billion, and Regent Ratna Ani Lestari, with losses of Rp 19.76 billion. Despite being marred by these corruption cases, the construction of the new airport continued in stages between 2004 and 2008, funded by the national budget. On April 21, 2009, the airport began to be used by the Bali International Flight Academy (BIFA) for takeoff and landing training for student pilots. Commercial flights commenced on December 29, 2010, operated by Sky Aviation, following a flight feasibility test conducted on December 26, 2010, using a Cessna 208 Grand Caravan aircraft. This inaugural flight also marked the official opening of Blimbingsari Airport as a commercial airport. The inauguration plaque was signed by then Deputy Minister of Transportation Bambang Susantono, East Java Governor Soekarwo, and Banyuwangi Regent Abdullah Azwar Anas.

=== Contemporary history ===
A major expansion occurred between 2015 and 2017, which included the construction of a new terminal and associated infrastructure, as well as the development of a new apron and runway extension to accommodate narrow-body aircraft such as the Boeing 737 and Airbus A320. The terminal features an eco-friendly design, making it the first green airport in Indonesia. In 2022, the airport was recognized as one of the six winners of the Aga Khan Award for Architecture.

Following the expansion, the airport began offering direct flights to Jakarta, initially operated by NAM Air, and later by Garuda Indonesia, Citilink, and Batik Air. Concurrently, the management of the airport was transferred from the Directorate General of Civil Aviation to Angkasa Pura II, which is now known as InJourney Airport. The airport was designated as a buffer airport for I Gusti Ngurah Rai International Airport during 2018 IMF-World Bank Annual Meeting in Bali held in October 2018.

In 2010 the airport only served 7,386 passengers, but in 2017 it served 140,683 passengers, an increase of 1,700 percent in seven years. It increased again significantly to 307,157 passengers in just 10 months of 2018.

In 2018, the airport was designated as an international airport, and Citilink launched a direct flight to Kuala Lumpur, Malaysia, in December of the same year. However, the route was short-lived, operating for only three months. Due to the absence of consistent international flights, the Ministry of Transportation revoked the airport's international status in April 2024. Despite this, efforts are underway to resume international flights, with proposals including charter flights to China and Taiwan.

The airport's international status was reactivated in August 2025.

== Facilities and development ==
Originally, the runway measured only 1,400 meters (4,600 ft) in length and could accommodate only small propeller-driven aircraft such as the Cessna 208. In 2012, the runway was extended to 1,800 meters (5,900 ft), allowing larger turboprop aircraft like the Fokker 50 and ATR 72 to operate from the airport. In 2011, the airport served just 7,826 passengers; by 2015, this number had grown to over 110,000 passengers.

To support further growth, an expansion and development program was launched to transform the airport into an international Low-Cost Carrier Airport (LCCA). This included the extension and widening of the runway to 2,500 meters in length and 45 meters in width, enabling it to accommodate narrow-body jets such as the Boeing 737 and Airbus A320. The apron was expanded to 41,000 square meters to accommodate up to nine narrow-body aircraft. The parking area was enlarged to 5,000 square meters, providing space for up to 260 vehicles. The passenger terminal was also expanded to 20,000 square meters, with a design inspired by the traditional houses of the Osing people of Banyuwangi and an open-air concept to reduce reliance on air conditioning. The expanded terminal is capable of handling up to two million passengers annually. The expansion took place between 2015 and 2017, with a total cost of approximately 100 billion rupiah.

=== Pilot schools ===
In addition, the airport serves as a training ground for several pilot schools. Initially, the Indonesian Ministry of Transportation established the Banyuwangi Aviation Education and Training Center (Loka Pendidikan dan Pelatihan Penerbangan Banyuwangi, or LP3B) at Banyuwangi Airport. This institution was designed to provide aviation education. On December 23, 2013, LP3B officially changed its name to the Banyuwangi Flight Training and Education Center (Balai Pendidikan dan Pelatihan Penerbang Banyuwangi, or BP3B). The campus has since expanded, with continuous improvements to its facilities and infrastructure. The number of instructors and human resources has also grown, becoming increasingly capable and qualified. Eventually, the institution achieved the status of the Indonesian Pilot Academy (Akademi Pilot Indonesia, or API).

In addition to the government-run institution under the Ministry of Transportation, private entities have also established pilot training schools at Banyuwangi Airport. These include the Bali International Flight Academy (BIFA) and Mandiri Utama Flight Academy (MUFA).

== Airlines and destinations ==
Airlines	Destinations
Super Air Jet	Jakarta–Soekarno-Hatta
Wings Air	Lombok, Surabaya

== Statistics ==
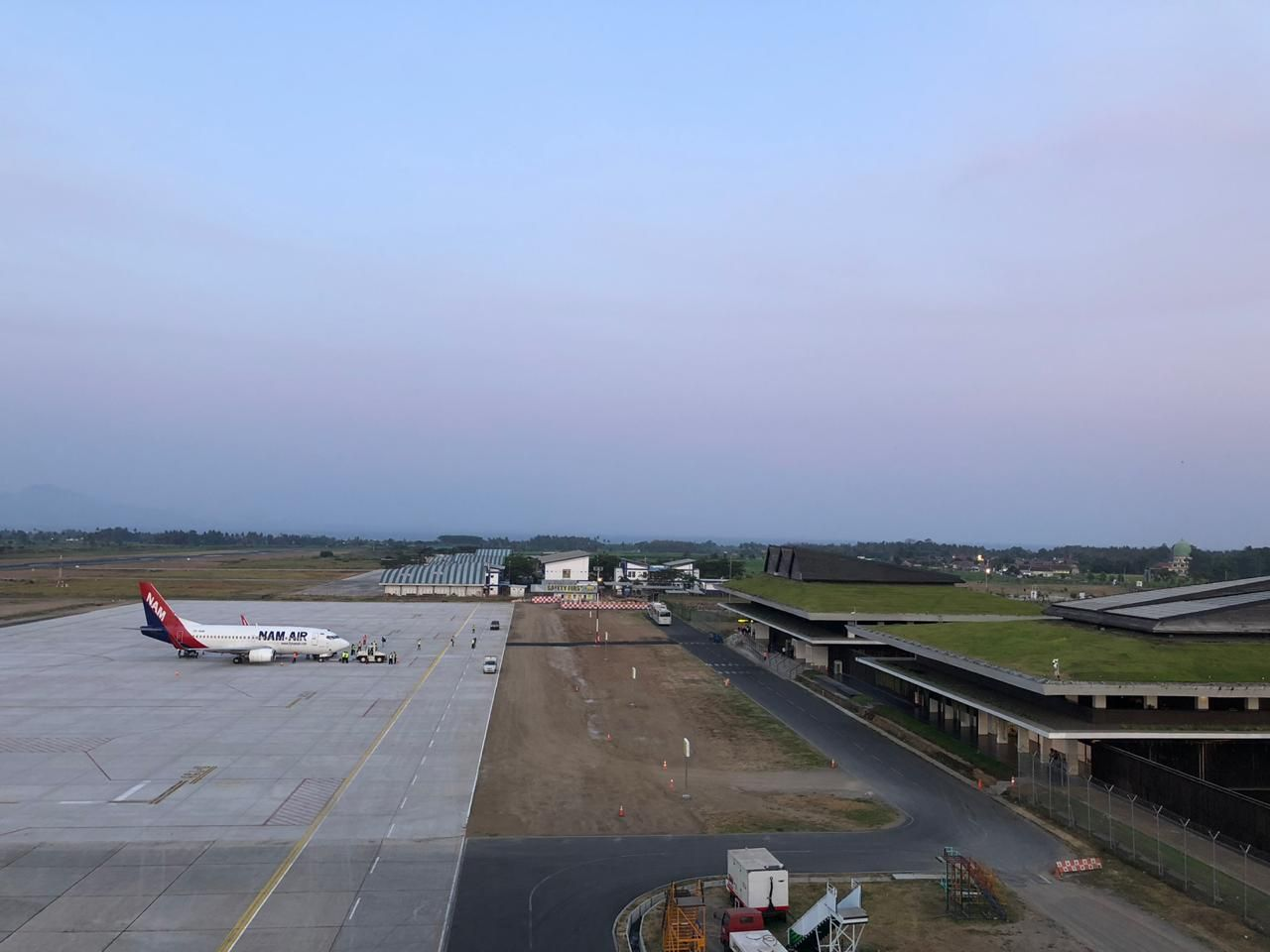
Apron view of the airport, showing a NAM Air Boeing 737-500 on standby

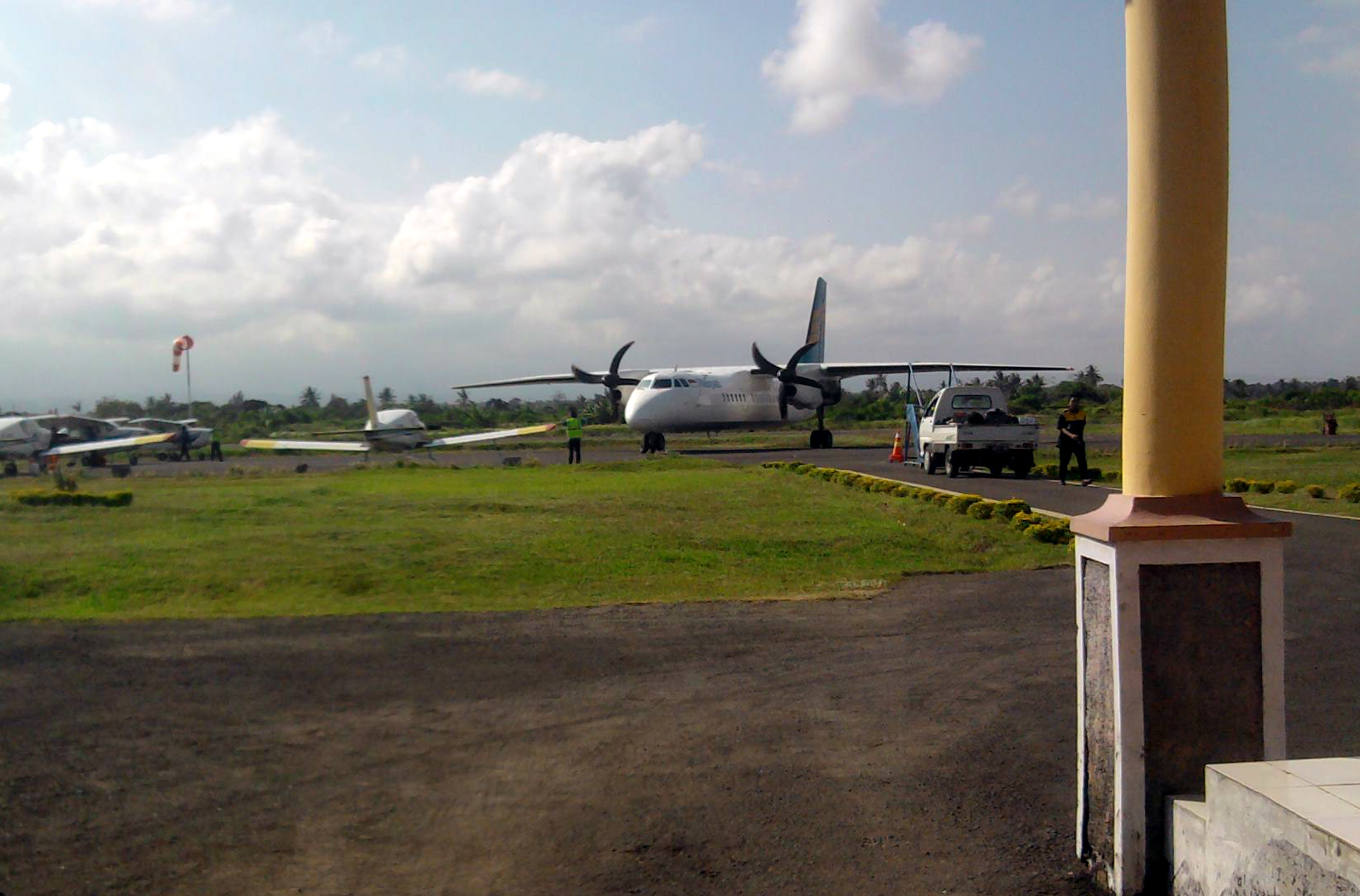
A Merpati Nusantara Airlines Xian MA-60 at Banyuwangi Airport

Annual passenger numbers and aircraft statistics
Year	Passengers handled	Passenger % change	Cargo (tonnes)	Cargo % change	Aircraft movements	Aircraft % change
2010	N/A	Steady	N/A	Steady	N/A	Steady
2011	2,901	Steady	N/A	Steady	4,260	Steady
2012	21,422	▲638.4	N/A	Steady	475	▼88.8
2013	40,072	▲87.1	21	Steady	666	▲40.2
2014	88,427	▲120.7	N/A	Steady	5,426	▲714.7
2015	40,660	▼54.0	N/A	Steady	490	▼91.0
2016	33,387	▼17.9	N/A	Steady	428	▼12.7
2017	30,289	▼9.3	6	Steady	535	▲25.0
2018	319,380	▲954.4	513	▲8450.0	7,136	▲1233.8
2019	276,987	▼13.3	343	▼33.1	4,567	▼36.0
2020	110,525	▼60.1	75	▼78.1	2,463	▼46.1
2021	58,803	▼46.8	106	▲41.3	1,873	▼24.0
2022	108,286	▲84.2	146	▲37.7	2,716	▲45.0
2023	150,214	▲38.7	109	▼25.3	2,249	▼17.2
2024	155,624	▲3.6	140	▲28.4	5,797	▲157.75
^{Source: DGCA, BPS}

== Accidents and incidents ==
- On 16 January 2017, a Cessna 172 operated by Mandiri Utama Flight Academy (MUFA) crashed after landing on the airport runway. The aircraft veered to the right, causing the propeller to strike the runway and produce sparks, which subsequently ignited a fire that engulfed the entire training aircraft. The sole occupant, the pilot, sustained minor injuries and was taken to the hospital. The airport runway was closed for several hours to safely evacuate the wreckage.
- On 4 February 2025, a Cessna 172S operated by the Indonesian Pilot Academy based at the airport crashed into the Bali Strait during a training flight, reportedly due to an engine problem. Both occupants survived and were safely rescued by local villagers and authorities. The aircraft was later recovered from the sea by cutting it into sections.
