= 2020 Banyuwangi regency election =

2020 Banyuwangi regental election
← 2015	9 December 2020	2024 →
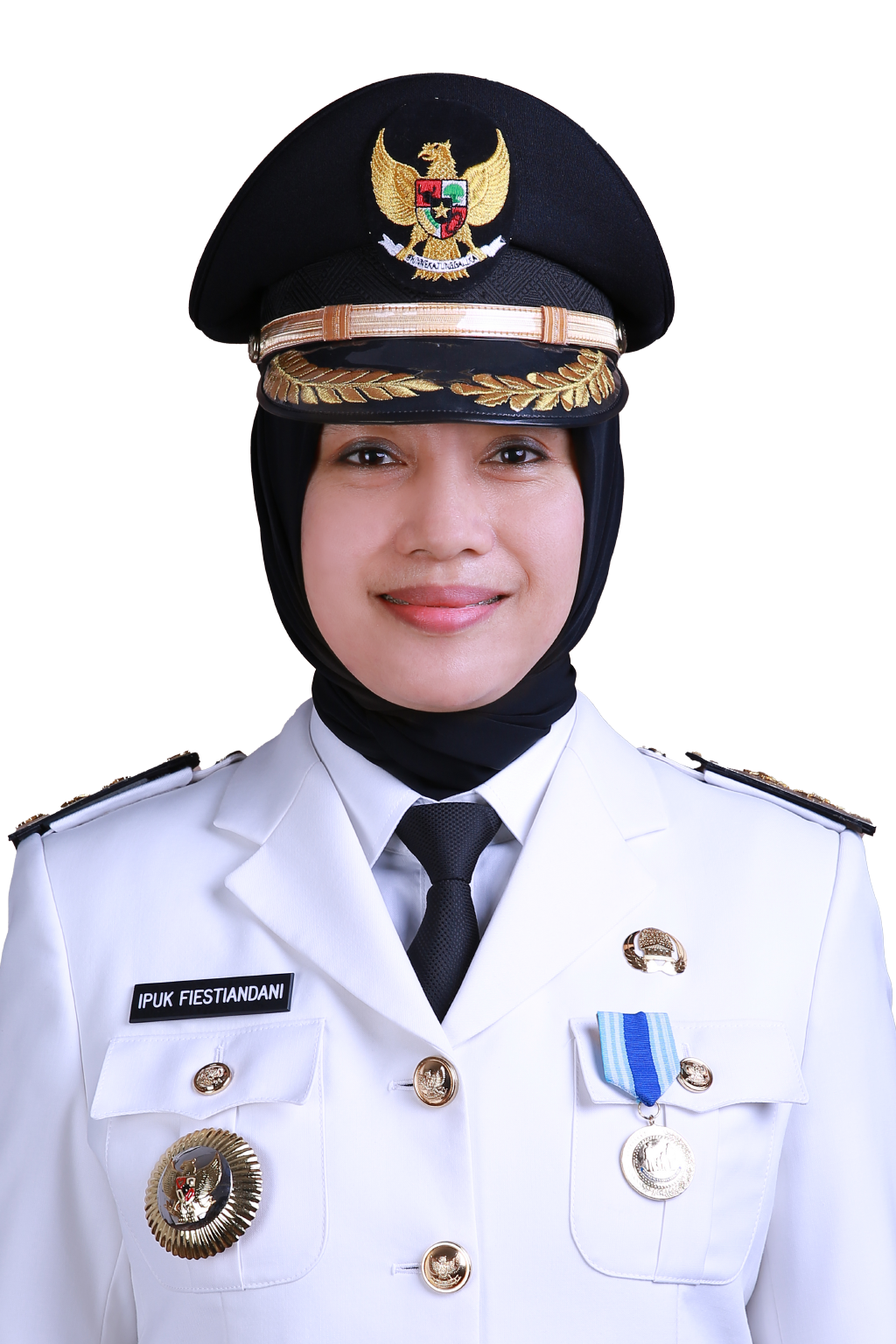

Candidate	Ipuk Fiestiandani	Yusuf Widyatmoko
Party	PDI-P	PKB
Running mate	Sugirah	Muhammad Riza Aziziy
Popular vote	438,847	398,113
Percentage	52.43%	47.57%
- Results by district
Regent before election
Abdullah Azwar Anas
PDI-P
Elected Regent
Ipuk Fiestiandani
PDI-P

The 2020 Banyuwangi regental election was held on 9 December 2020 to elect both the regent and vice-regent of Banyuwangi Regency as part of local elections across Indonesia. The incumbent regent, Abdullah Azwar Anas, was term-limited. The pair of Ipuk Fiestiandani and Sugirah were elected regent and vice-regent respectively. The election was noted for the rise of a political dynasty, as Ipuk was the wife of the incumbent regent.

== Results ==
Candidate	Running mate	Party	Votes	%
Ipuk Fiestiandani	Sugirah	PDI-P	438,847	52.43
Yusuf Widyatmoko	Muhammad Riza Aziziy	PKB	398,113	47.57
Total			836,960	100.00
Valid votes			836,960	98.21
Invalid/blank votes			15,242	1.79
Total votes			852,202	100.00
Registered voters/turnout			1,311,633	64.97
Source: General Elections Commission

=== By district ===
District	Ipuk–Sugirah		Yusuf–Riza		Total
District	Votes	%	Votes	%	Total
Bangorejo	13,708	40.96%	19,762	59.04%	33,470
Banyuwangi	30,037	57.28%	22,401	42.72%	52,438
Blimbingsari	13,007	45.92%	15,317	54.08%	28,324
Cluring	19,220	47.41%	21,319	52.59%	40,539
Gambiran	13,968	41.21%	19,930	58.79%	33,898
Genteng	20,528	46.61%	23,510	53.39%	44,038
Giri	9,339	56.44%	7,207	43.56%	16,546
Glagah	11,012	53.58%	9,539	46.42%	20,551
Glenmore	17,351	45.97%	20,390	54.03%	37,741
Kabat	17,515	53.23%	15,388	46.77%	32,903
Kalibaru	14,058	46.09%	16,441	53.91%	30,499
Kalipuro	23,569	58.73%	16,562	41.27%	40,131
Licin	7,230	47.07%	8,131	52.93%	15,361
Muncar	27,117	44.68%	33,580	55.32%	60,697
Pesanggaran	13,154	53.26%	11,546	46.74%	24,700
Purwoharjo	16,235	45.65%	19,329	54.35%	35,564
Rogojampi	14,437	48.82%	15,133	51.18%	29,570
Sempu	16,220	41.31%	23,042	58.69%	39,262
Siliragung	9,027	36.46%	15,733	63.54%	24,760
Singojuruh	12,297	45.28%	14,858	54.72%	27,155
Songgon	13,999	46.54%	16,083	53.46%	30,082
Srono	20,357	43.65%	26,281	56.35%	46,638
Tegaldlimo	16,564	48.69%	17,454	51.31%	34,018
Tegalsari	9,175	34.08%	17,746	65.92%	26,921
Wongsorejo	18,989	60.95%	12,165	39.05%	31,154
Total	398,113	47.57%	438,847	52.43%	836,960
Source: General Elections Commission
