= Dorce Gamalama =

Indonesian pop singer, actress, presenter, and comedian (1963–2022)

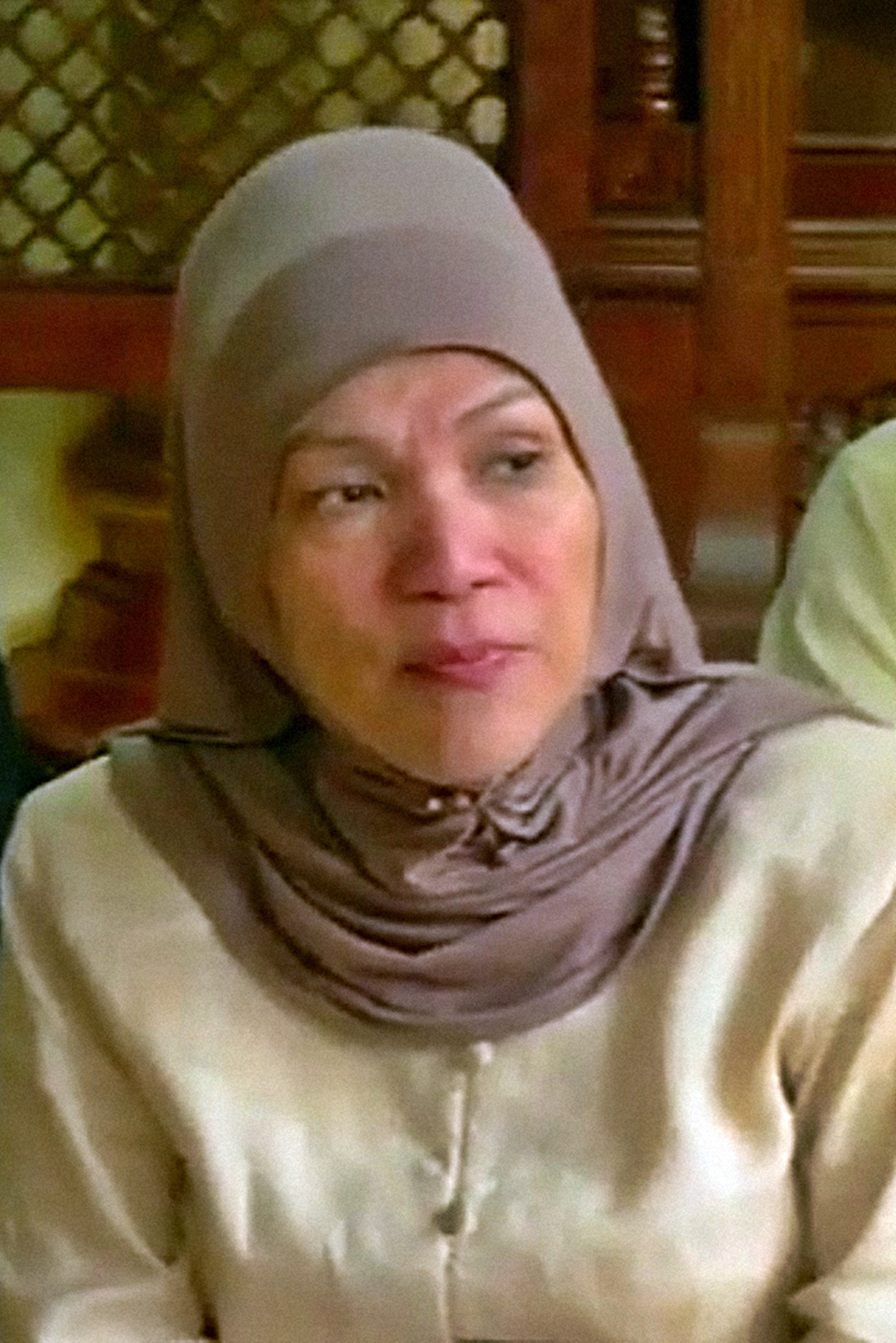
- Dorce in 2014

Background information
- Born: Dedi Yuliardi Ashadi; 21 July 1963; Solok, West Sumatra, Indonesia
- Died: 16 February 2022 (aged 58) Pertamina Central Hospital, Jakarta, Indonesia
- Genres: Pop, Keroncong, Dangdut
- Occupation: Singer-songwriter
- Instrument: Vocals

Dorce Gamalama (21 July 1963 – 16 February 2022) was an Indonesian pop singer, actress, presenter, and comedian, who was a trans woman. She was often referred to as "Bunda" (Indonesian for "Mother").

== Early life ==
Dorce Gamalama was born in Solok, West Sumatra, Indonesia, on 21 July 1963, with the name Dedi Yuliardi Ashadi. Her mother Dalifah, a rice seller, died of unknown causes when she was three months old, whereas her father Achmad, a painter and soldier, left home when she was 5 months old and was found dead when she was 1 year old, leaving her orphaned. Dorce Gamalama was subsequently raised by her grandmother Darama, who introduced her to music while she was still at elementary school. She went on to sing with a group called the Bambang Brothers (BamBros). When she was 5 years old, she moved to the capital city to live with her aunt Dalima. She started working when she was 7 years old: selling newspapers, washing dishes, and selling cakes around the neighborhood.

Dorce Gamalama noted that she first experienced gender dysphoria when she was 7 years old, describing it as feeling imprisoned in her own body, and she first had the opportunity to wear a dress on stage during an Indonesian Independence Day school play where she played the role of a grandmother. In her teens, she began to appear on stage in women's clothes, moving from Bambros to the trans women-led band Fantastic Dolls, and she took the stage name Dorce Ashadi. In the band, she met with Tata Dado and became her best friend. She later underwent sex reassignment surgery in Surabaya. Her stage name was derived from Mount Gamalama in Ternate. Her gender change was officially recognized in 1986.

== Career ==
Dorce Gamalama was the host of the popular mid-morning Dorce Show on the Trans TV network in Indonesia, and has written an autobiography entitled Aku Perempuan. In her book, she revealed that when she was 23 years old, she was married to a man, whom she called "Mr X", but the marriage only lasted two years. On 12 May 2009, Dorce Gamalama announced that her show had been cancelled.

In June 2014, Dorce Gamalama was on an airplane riding in business class when she encountered then-presidential candidate Joko Widodo sitting in an economy class seat. She went on to endorse his presidential campaign, participating in a campaign event, "Join Jokowi", with hundreds of housewives near the Selamat Datang Monument. However, in July 2015, months after he was inaugurated as President of Indonesia, she retracted her endorsement when Widodo did not attend Masjid Al-Hayya's 52nd anniversary, saying she would back singer Rhoma Irama for president if Irama was to announce his run. Nevertheless, in December 2015, Widodo invited Dorce Gamalama to a party at Jakarta's Istana Negara.

Dorce Gamalama started a floral design business in Bekasi in January 2020 while having Type 2 diabetes and recovering from kidney stones.

In June 2020, Dorce Gamalama worked as a chauffeur for fellow celebrity Raffi Ahmad and his wife, Nagita Slavina, for only a week, before resigning for medical reasons. She claimed she asked to be his chauffeur due to a dream she allegedly had during the month of Ramadan that year. After resigning, she said she wanted to drive for President Joko Widodo. Since Dorce Gamalama declined monetary compensation for her work, Ahmad decided to give her a video camera as a present, urging her to become a YouTuber.

Dorce Gamalama's health continued to decline and, by January 2021, she began to prepare for her Islamic funeral, from the burial plot to the kaffan shroud. She was reportedly hesitant about going through lithotomy to remove her kidney stones, instead opting for dietary changes and traditional medicine, such as water from the Zamzam Well in Mecca. She reportedly fell ill from hypotension while fasting during Ramadan that year, and said she planned to earn extra income from videos posted on YouTube amid a drought in job offers.

== Personal life ==
Dorce Gamalama was of Minangkabau descent from her mother's side, as well as Binjai-Arab from her father's side. She had four adopted children and owned a number of orphanages that have cared for thousands of children. She additionally had six adopted grandchildren.

She was a Muslim, and went on Hajj to Mecca in 1990 and 1991. On 9 November 2008, she attended the funeral of Imam Samudra, one of the men executed for the 2002 Bali bombings. She spent half an hour in the house of the executed man and spoke with his mother. On leaving she was quoted as saying "I'm certain he's gone to heaven".

Dorce Gamalama once lived in traditional Minang-style home, a Rumah Gadang, which was sold in November 2018 for 2 billion Indonesian Rupiah (approximately $140,100) to help raise funds for orphaned children in Palestine, Syria, and Indonesia.

She died from complications of COVID-19 on 16 February 2022, at the age of 58. She had tested positive three weeks prior. Her final wish to be buried as a woman was not respected by her family or religious leaders.

== Filmography ==
- 2008 - Mas Suka Masukin Aja
- 2009 - Hantu Biang Kerok as Mbah Upit
