= Tjahjo Kumolo =

Indonesian politician (1957–2022)

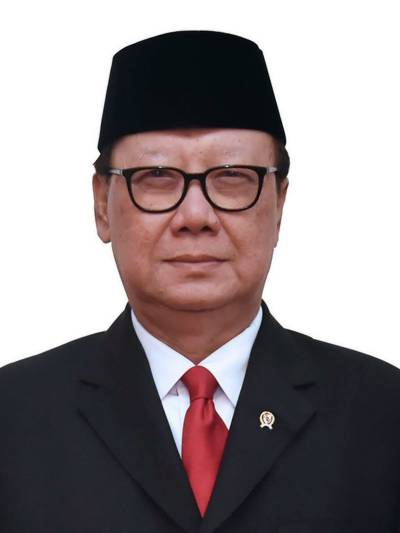
- Official portrait, 2019

19th Minister of Administrative and Bureaucratic Reform
- In office 23 October 2019 – 1 July 2022
- President: Joko Widodo
- Preceded by: Syafruddin Kambo
- Succeeded by: Abdullah Azwar Anas

28th Minister of Home Affairs
- In office 27 October 2014 – 20 October 2019
- President: Joko Widodo
- Preceded by: Gamawan Fauzi
- Succeeded by: Tito Karnavian

Member of the House of Representatives
- In office 1 October 1999 – 27 October 2014
- Succeeded by: Tuti Nusandari Roosdiono
- Constituency: Central Java (1999–2004); Central Java III (2004–2009); Central Java I (2009–2014)
- In office 1 October 1987 – 31 September 1997
- Constituency: Central Java

Secretary-General of the Indonesian Democratic Party of Struggle
- In office 8 April 2010 – 28 October 2014
- General Chair: Megawati Sukarnoputri
- Preceded by: Pramono Anung
- Succeeded by: Hasto Kristiyanto

Personal details
- Born: 1 December 1957 Surakarta, Indonesia
- Died: 1 July 2022 (aged 64) Jakarta, Indonesia
- Resting place: Kalibata Heroes' Cemetery
- Party: PDI-P
- Spouse: Erni Guntarti
- Children: 3
- Education: Diponegoro University; National Resilience Institute

Tjahjo Kumolo (1 December 1957 – 1 July 2022) was an Indonesian politician. He served as Minister of Home Affairs in the Working Cabinet (2014–2019), and Minister of Administrative and Bureaucratic Reform in the Onward Indonesia Cabinet from 2019 until his death, both under President Joko Widodo.

He was a longtime loyalist of former president Megawati Sukarnoputri and a senior member of her Indonesian Democratic Party of Struggle (PDI-P). Tjahjo Kumolo was Secretary General of PDI-P between 2010 and 2015, and was a member of the People's Representative Council (DPR) between 1999 and 2014 during which time he was the speaker of his party's faction until his replacement by later fellow minister Puan Maharani. During the New Order regime of President Suharto, he served two terms in the DPR between 1987 and 1997.

== Early life and education ==
=== Early life ===
Tjahjo Kumolo (EYD: Cahyo Kumolo) was born in Surakarta (often referred to as Solo) on 1 December 1957. He attended school for 12 years in the larger city of Semarang and lived in the Mlatiharjo administrative village (kelurahan) on the eastern side of the city. His father, Bambang Soebandiono, was a lieutenant in the Indonesian Army. Both his father and his mother Toeti Slemoon had at some point sat in the People's Representative Council, the former having served five terms.

=== Education ===
After graduating from high school, Tjahjo Kumolo studied law at Diponegoro University, graduating in 1985. During this period, he was elected leader of KNPI's (National Committee of Indonesian Youth) Central Java chapter. He also studied at the National Resilience Institute until 1994.

== Political career ==
=== People's Representative Council ===
Prior to his tenure for the KNPI, Tjahjo Kumolo worked as a reporter for a daily paper in Central Java. He first became a member of the People's Representative Council in 1985, which necessitated his move to Jakarta. Initially he was a member of Golkar, being elected to the parliament in 1987 and 1992. He had worked in the second and third commissions of the parliament in addition to the interparliamentary partnership body (BKSAP). Following the fall of Suharto, he moved to PDI-P and was elected back into the parliament in 1999. In this term, he acted as deputy speaker of the faction until 2002, followed by being a faction secretary until 2003.

He ran once more in the 2004 elections and remained in the parliament, this time as the speaker of the PDI-P faction until another election in 2009, when he once more secured his seat. He was also chosen as the Secretary General of PDI-P in 2010 by party leader Megawati Soekarnoputri. Later, his faction speaker position would be taken in 2012 by Puan Maharani and his secretary general position in 2015 by Hasto Kristiyanto.

=== Minister of Home Affairs ===
Following Joko Widodo's election victory over Prabowo Subianto in 2014, Tjahjo Kumolo was selected as Minister of Home Affairs in the Working Cabinet and was officially sworn in on 27 October 2014.

During the blasphemy accusations against Basuki Tjahaja Purnama in 2017, he refused to suspend the Chinese Indonesian governor of Jakarta. Later in the same year, he disbanded the Indonesian branch of Hizbut Tahrir.

=== Bureaucratic Reform Minister ===
In Widodo's second term, Tjahjo Kumolo was appointed Minister of Administrative and Bureaucratic Reform. During his tenure, the ministry began evaluations on a variety of government bodies, assessing potential dissolutions or mergers to save costs and simplify bureaucracy. Starting in 2022, he established a program for new civil servants to participate in military reserve training, though he later clarified that the program was not mandatory.

== Personal life ==
Tjahjo Kumolo married Erni Guntarti and the couple has three children. His wife is a doctor and first child is a dentist, with his second child is graduated from law school and the third as a flight attendant.

He was a practicing Muslim, hailed from a religious diverse family background. While his father was a Nahdlatul Ulama official in later life and his mother was a Muhammadiyah activist from Solo and so himself, his extended family from both sides belonged to Gereja Kristen Jawi Wetan, a Protestant church. He claimed that his experience in such a family formed him to be a religious moderate.

Tjahjo Kumolo died after being hospitalized for two weeks at the Abdi Waluyo Hospital in Jakarta on 1 July 2022. The cause of his death was multiple organ failure due to asthenia, lung infection, diabetes, and gout. His four diseases were unknown to the public prior to his death. He was buried in a military funeral at Kalibata Heroes' Cemetery on the same day. He was 64, leaving 3 sons.

Political offices
Preceded by Gamawan Fauzi	Minister of Home Affairs; 2014–2019	Succeeded by Tito Karnavian
Preceded by Syafruddin Kambo	Minister of Administrative and Bureaucratic Reform; 2019–2022	Succeeded by Abdullah Azwar Anas
Party political offices
Preceded by Pramono Anung	Secretary General of the Indonesian Democratic Party of Struggle; 2010–2015	Succeeded by Hasto Kristiyanto
