= Tata Dado =

Indonesian comedian (1965–2013)

Safei Salifan Dado (12 June 1965 – 18 March 2013), known professionally as Tata Dado was an Indonesian drag queen and comedian.

== Personal life ==
Tata was born on 12 June 1965 from Abdul Al Dado as his father.

== Career ==
Tata started his career as part of Silver Boys, a drag queen comedian group, on June 12, 1985 that consisted of his high school friends. The group frequently performed in nightclubs and hotels. The group starred in final of Penghuni Terakhir, Indonesian reality show. He has trademark by impersonating figures such as Madonna and Marilyn Monroe and wearing inline skate and artificial feather in his neck as part of his attire. His act made him invited by Harry de Fretes in 1991 in Lenong Rumpi, comedy tv series that made him gain public recognition. Then, she continued star in Lenong Rumpi 2 as Marlena, a lower-class woman that wear a feather boa, a Marilyn Monroe wig and a comedic delivery in female attire while occasionally breaking into his masculine voice She was also part of Fantastic Doll together with Dorce Gamalama. Then, he starred in Mas Suka Masukin Aja in 2008. He starred in Pijat Atas Tekan Bawah in 2009. He also starred in Pocong mandi goyang pinggul in 2011 that also starred by Sasha Grey.

== Death ==
Since 2011, Tata was having a stroke due to diabetes that he was having for three years that made him stopped his career. Dorce said that the reason that he was afflicted by the diabetes was caused by his habit of drinking coke. He was dead on 18 March 2013 due to complication of stroke. He was buried on Karet Bivak Cemetery in the same plot as his father on 19 March 2013.

== Gender ==
Though he usually starred as drag queen, he always identified himself as a man.
