= Samsul Hadi =

Indonesian politician (1959–2014)

25th Regent of Banyuwangi
- In office 2000–2005
- Deputy: Abdul Kadir
- Preceded by: Turyono Purnomo Sidik
- Succeeded by: Ratna Ani Lestari

Personal details
- Born: 23 April 1959 Banyuwangi, East Java
- Died: 15 September 2014 (aged 55) Banyuwangi
- Spouse: Erna Samsul Hadi (Erna Padmi Andajaningrum)

Samsul Hadi (23 April 1959 – 15 September 2014) was an Indonesian politician who served as the regent of Banyuwangi, East Java. He served between 2000 and 2005.

== Regent ==
During his tenure, he initiated a tourism project in which the government created a replica of a Majapahit-era explorer ship, meant to undergo an expedition to promote the regency. However, the ship sank. He also enacted policies to promote local culture, namely the Osing identity and language. Under his term, the construction of Blimbingsari Airport was initiated.

He failed to secure party support to run in the 2005 regency election, namely due to a split in the National Awakening Party, the largest party within Banyuwangi's local legislature. The split was exacerbated by a national-level dispute in leadership between former president Abdurrahman Wahid and his nephew Muhaimin Iskandar, with Wahid threatening for PKB to boycott the election if the General Elections Commission did not accept Samsul as the party's candidate. Samsul's protesters also held protests at KPU's local offices and Samsul had threatened to withhold election funding from the municipal budget. His candidacy remained failed, however, and Ratna Ani Lestari was elected to succeed him.

== Corruption case ==
In 2007, he was arrested and convicted of corruption regarding the construction of Blimbingsari Airport, a floating dock, and the purchase of LCTs operating in the Bali Strait. He was sentenced to six years in prison in 2008 for the LCT case. Due to his old age, he was not transferred to the usual prison for corruption, but was held at Banyuwangi instead. He was convicted once more in 2010 for the airport case, adding an additional 6 years to his sentence.

== Death ==
During his time in prison, he fell down in a bathroom. Samsul passed away two days later on 15 September 2014, 01.30 WIB following a hospital treatment. He was survived by his wife and three children.

Initially meant to be buried in a public cemetery, he was instead buried in a burial complex for Banyuwangi's Regents.

Political offices
Preceded by: Turyono Purnomo Sidik	Regent of Banyuwangi; 2000–2005	Succeeded by: Ratna Ani Lestari
