= Ministry of State Apparatus Utilization and Bureaucratic Reform =

Government ministry of Indonesia

- Kementerian Pendayagunaan Aparatur Negara dan Reformasi Birokrasi
- Logo of the Ministry of State Apparatus Utilization and Bureaucratic Reform

- Flag of the Ministry of State Apparatus Utilization and Bureaucratic Reform

Ministry overview
- Formed: 10 June 1968
- Jurisdiction: Government of Indonesia
- Headquarters: Jenderal Sudirman Street kav. 69, South Jakarta, Jakarta, Indonesia
- Minister responsible: Rini Widyantini, Minister of State Apparatus Utilization and Bureaucratic Reform
- Website: www.menpan.go.id

Ministry of State Apparatus Utilization and Bureaucratic Reform (Indonesian: Kementerian Pendayagunaan Aparatur Negara dan Reformasi Birokrasi) is a government ministry that is responsible for public servants in Indonesia. The ministry reports to the President of Indonesia, and is currently led by Rini Widyantini as minister.

== Organization ==
According to Presidential Decree No. 178/2024 and Ministry of State Apparatus Utilization and Bureaucratic Reform Decree No. 1/2025, the ministry consisted of:

- Office of the Ministry of State Apparatus Utilization and Bureaucratic Reform
- Office of the Deputy Ministry of State Apparatus Utilization and Bureaucratic Reform
- Secretariat of the Ministry
  - Bureau of Performance Management and Collaborations
  - Bureau of Human Resources, Organization, and Law
  - Bureau of Data and IT
  - Bureau of Communication and Public Relations
  - Bureau of General Affairs and Finance
- Deputy for Bureaucratic Reform, Accountability of Apparatus, and Supervision (Deputy I)
  - Assistant Deputy for Formulation and Coordination of Applied Policies for Bureaucratic Reform
  - Assistant Deputy for Formulation and Coordination of Applied Policies for Accountability of Apparatus and Supervision
  - Assistant Deputy for Coordination of Policy Execution and Evaluation for Bureaucratic Reform, Accountability of Apparatus, and Supervision I
  - Assistant Deputy for Formulation and Coordination of Applied Policies for Bureaucratic Reform, Accountability of Apparatus, and Supervision II
  - Assistant Deputy for Formulation and Coordination of Applied Policies for Bureaucratic Reform, Accountability of Apparatus, and Supervision III
- Deputy for Institutions and Implementation (Deputy II)
  - Assistant Deputy for Formulation and Coordination of Institutions and Implementation
  - Assistant Deputy for Institutional Affairs, Implementations in Political, Legal, and Security Affairs, and Regional Governments in Region I
  - Assistant Deputy for Institutional Affairs, Implementations in Economics and Infrastructure Affairs, and Regional Governments in Region II
  - Assistant Deputy for Institutions Affairs, Implementations in Human Development and Community Empowerment Affairs, and Infrastructure Affairs, and Regional Governments in Region III
  - Assistant Deputy for Institutions Affairs, Implementations in Foods and Regional Development Affairs, and Regional Governments in Region IV
- Deputy for Human Resources of Apparatus (Deputy III)
  - Assistant Deputy for Planning and Procurement of Human Resources of Apparatus
  - Assistant Deputy for Apparatus Work Culture Strengthening and Competency Development
  - Assistant Deputy for Apparatus Standardization and Talent Management
  - Assistant Deputy for Apparatus Performance Management, Awarding, and Acknowledgement
  - Assistant Deputy for Apparatus Merit System Development and Management Evaluation
- Deputy for Public Services (Deputy IV)
  - Assistant Deputy for Development of Public Service Policies
  - Assistant Deputy for Community Participation Empowerment
  - Assistant Deputy for Accessibility and Inclusive Services
  - Assistant Deputy for Good Practices Development in Public Service
  - Assistant Deputy for Facilitation, Monitoring, and Evaluation of Public Services
- Deputy for Government Digital Transformation (Deputy V)
  - Assistant Deputy for Policies and Strategy Development of Government Digital Transformation
  - Assistant Deputy for Management of Government Digital Transformation
  - Assistant Deputy for Coordination of Government Digital Transformation Application
  - Assistant Deputy for Integrative Government Digital Transformation
- Inspectorate
- Board of Experts
  - Special Advisor to the Minister on Politics and Law
  - Special Advisor to the Minister on Government and Regional Autonomy
  - Special Advisor to the Minister on State Administration
  - Special Advisor to the Minister on Working Culture

== Gallery ==
Logo of Ministry of State Apparatus Utilization (2001–2009)

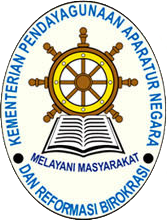
Logo of Ministry of State Apparatus Utilization and Bureaucratic Reform (2009–2021)

Logo of Ministry of State Apparatus Utilization and Bureaucratic Reform (2021–present)
