= Abdullah Azwar Anas =

Indonesian politician (born 1973)

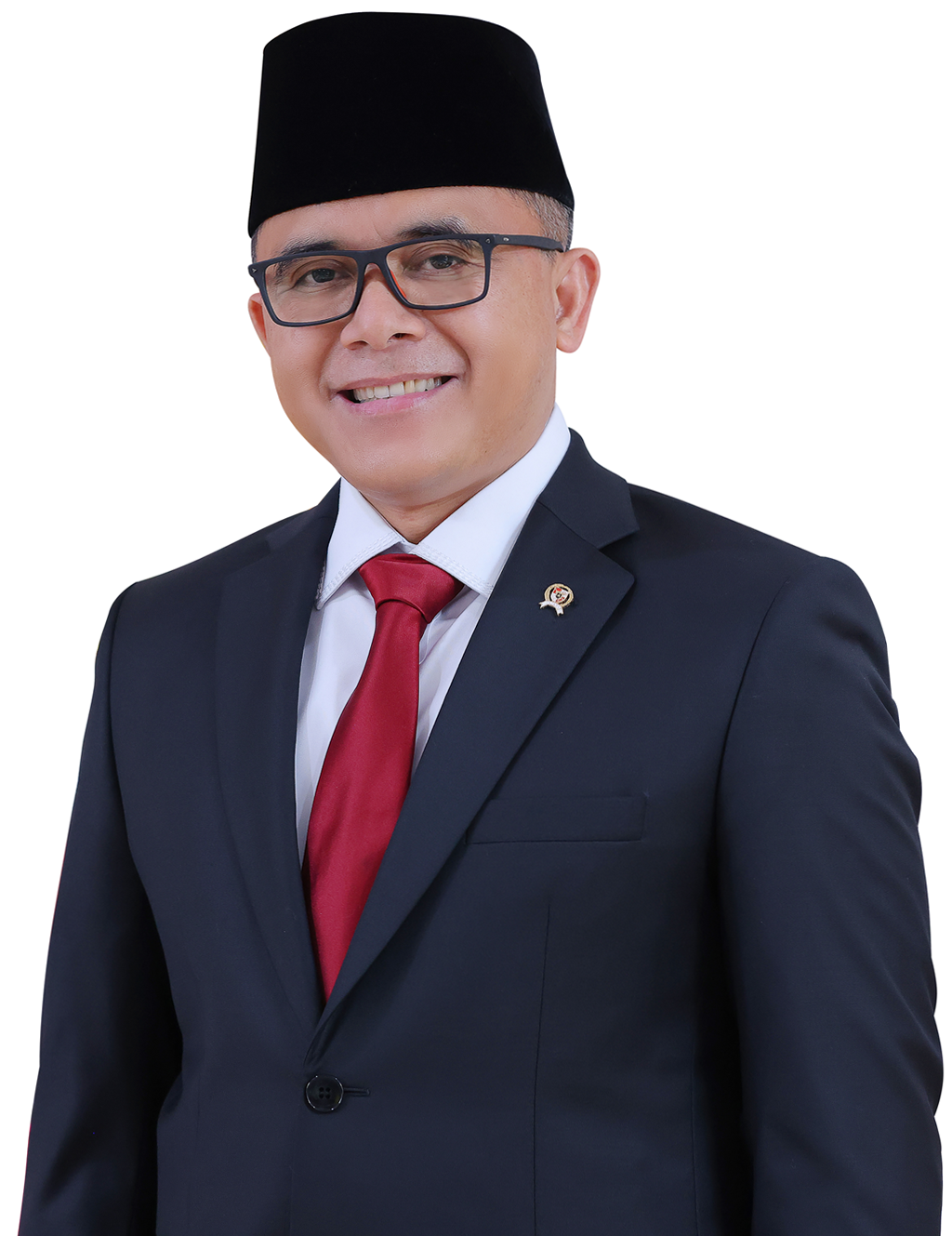

20th Minister of State Apparatus Utilization and Bureaucratic Reform
- In office 7 September 2022 – 21 October 2024
- President: Joko Widodo
- Preceded by: Tjahjo Kumolo
- Succeeded by: Rini Widyantini

27th Regent of Banyuwangi
- In office 17 February 2016 – 17 February 2021
- Preceded by: Zarkasi (act.); Himself
- Succeeded by: Mujiono (act.); Ipuk Fiestiandani
- In office 21 October 2010 – 21 October 2015
- Preceded by: Ratna Ani Lestari
- Succeeded by: Zarkasi (act.); Himself

Member of People's Representative Council
- In office 1 October 2004 – 1 October 2009
- Constituency: East Java III

Member of People's Consultative Assembly
- In office 1 October 1997 – 1 October 1999

Personal details
- Born: 6 August 1973 (age 53) Banyuwangi, East Java, Indonesia
- Party: PKB (2004–15); PDI-P (since 2015)
- Spouse: Ipuk Fiestiandani
- Education: University of Indonesia; Jakarta State University

Abdullah Azwar Anas (born 6 August 1973) is an Indonesian politician. He served as Minister of Administrative and Bureaucratic Reform between September 2022 and October 2024. Before becoming a minister, he was the regent of Banyuwangi, East Java, between 2010 and 2015 and 2016 to 2021. Prior to becoming a regent, he had served as both an elected member of the People's Representative Council and an appointment to the People's Consultative Assembly, for one term each.

Born in Banyuwangi, Anas completed his education at the University of Indonesia before joining the Consultative Assembly for 2 years. Later, he was elected in 2004 for a five-year term in the legislative council, and was elected as regent of Banyuwangi after failing to win his re-election.

== Background and education ==
Abdullah Azwar Anas was born in Banyuwangi on 6 August 1973, his father a local kyai in the Karangdoro village, part of Banyuwangi's Tegalsari subdistrict. Being the second children of ten, his older brother died at youth, making him the eldest surviving children. He completed his primary education in madrasa, studying in one at his origin village and another in Sumenep, Madura. He later moved to state-funded regular schools, studying in two middle schools before moving to Jember for his highschool.

After completing high school, he moved to Jakarta to study literature in the University of Indonesia (UI), earning his bachelor's degree in 1999 before further earning a master's degree in social and political science by 2005. In addition, he also studied education technology at Jakarta State University (then known as IKIP Jakarta), graduating with a bachelor's degree in 1998. During his time at UI, he was the president of the central committee of the Nahdlatul Ulama student association. He had also become a radio broadcaster of Jember-based Prosalina when at highschool.

== Career ==
=== Parliament ===
After graduating from university, he was appointed to the People's Consultative Assembly as a class envoy in 1997 at the age of 24, making him the youngest envoy of that year. Following the fall of Suharto, he ran but lost in the 1999 legislative election. Joining the National Awakening Party, he secured a seat from the East Java III district in the 2004 election after winning 135,667 votes - the third most in the district. However, he was not reelected in 2009, when he was reassigned by his party to the East Java VII district. According to Anas in an interview, he "was not serious" and was not present in the electoral district during the campaigning period.

During his term, he was active in multiple special committees, and part of investigations teams on BLBI (a liquidity aid to Bank Indonesia), a 2008 fuel price hike, the 2008 hajj season and an electoral ballot case. He was part of the eighth commission.

=== Regent of Banyuwangi ===
In 2010, Anas ran in a local election for Banyuwangi Regency with Yusuf Widyatmoko as his running mate. Supported by PKB, PDI-P, Golkar, PKS and PKNU, the pair secured 49.23 percent of the votes (372,149) in a three-way contest. He was re-elected in 2015 with a landslide, winning 88.96 percent of votes with the support of PDI-P and six other parties, although his former party PKB did not support him.

In 2016, Banyuwangi received an award from the World Tourism Organization, winning in the "Re-Inventing Government in Tourism" category as the first Indonesian part to receive an award from the organization. When Anas entered office in 2010, Banyuwangi was visited by 487 thousand tourists annually, with the number increasing to 4.6 million by 2017. He also established a regency-owned, 7,600-square meter tourism resort focusing on local culture.

Two of the regency's programs - a peer support program for students and an electronic village budgeting program - was named by the Ministry of Administrative and Bureaucratic Reform in its list of 99 most innovative programs nationally.

Anas established a 55,000-hectare permanent farmland area in the regency, meant to conserve the agricultural production. Economically, Banyuwangi experienced a 62% increase in GDP per capita between 2010 and 2014, with the local government budget increasing by 150% between 2010 and 2015. The regency received an award from the central government in 2016 for the economic growth.

In 2017, Anas took over a derelict former retail building in the city, and repurposed it as a one-stop administrative center which covered 80 kinds of services. Dubbed a "public service mall" (inspired by the Public Service Hall in Georgia), the concept was well-received by residents and was soon copied by other local governments across the country. In 2019, a "public service market" with a similar concept was established to service Banyuwangi's western and southern districts.

Reports of alleged corruption under his administration were filed to the Corruption Eradication Commission in 2012 and 2017.

In 2018, he was named by PDI-P as running mate to Saifullah Yusuf in the 2018 gubernatorial election. However, vulgar images rumored to be him were circulated, resulting in him withdrawing from the race. He was succeeded by his wife Ipuk Fiestiandani.

=== Minister ===
After a stint as head of the National Public Procurement Agency in January–September 2022, Anas was appointed Minister of State Apparatus Utilization and Bureaucratic Reform on 7 September 2022. In this post, Anas promoted the public service mall concept throughout Indonesia, and by June 2024 over 200 such locations had been established.
