= SMA Negeri 68 Jakarta =

Location
- Komplek Pendidikan, Jalan Salemba Raya No. 18; Salemba Raya, Jakarta Pusat, DKI Jakarta; Jakarta Pusat, DKI Jakarta 10430; Indonesia

Information
- Type: Public school
- Motto: Disiplin, Kreasi, Prestasi
- Established: 1981
- Enrollment: 280/year
- Website: http://www.sman68.sch.id

SMA Negeri 68 Jakarta (popularly abbreviated as enamlapan) is a public high school located at Salemba Raya street in Central Jakarta, Indonesia. The school is in one complex with SMP Negeri 216 Jakarta, SD Negeri Kenari, and Menza functional building. It was established on 29 August 1981, after being inaugurated by President Soeharto. In 2006, it was appointed to become RSBI (Rintisan Sekolah Bertaraf Internasional). Today, there are 840 students and 103 teachers and staff.

== Annual events ==
SMA 68 has an annual event, usually held in October and early November, called Bazkom (Bazaar dan Kompetisi). Starting in 2016, 68 has another annual event, called FINAL (Festival Islam Enam Lapan).

== See also ==
- List of schools in Indonesia
