= Ratna Ani Lestari =

Indonesian politician (born 1965)

- ᮛᮒ᮪ᮔ ᮃᮔᮤ ᮜ᮪ᮞ᮪ᮒᮛᮤ ꦫꦠ꧀ꦤ ꦄꦤꦶ ꦭ꧀ꦭꦼꦱ꧀ꦠꦫꦶ
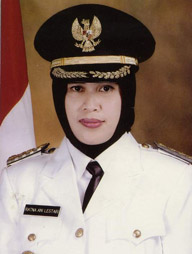
- Official portrait, 2005

26th Regent of Banyuwangi
- In office 20 October 2005 – 20 October 2010
- Preceded by: Samsul Hadi
- Succeeded by: Abdullah Azwar Anas

Member of Jembrana Regency Council
- In office 2004–2005

Personal details
- Born: 6 December 1965 (age 60) Banten, Indonesia
- Party: Independent
- Other political affiliations: PDI-P
- Spouse: I Gede Winasa (divorced 2012)
- Children: 4 (including I Gede Ngurah Patriana Krisna)
- Education: University of National Education

Ratna Ani Lestari (Sundanese: ᮛᮒ᮪ᮔ ᮃᮔᮤ ᮜ᮪ᮞ᮪ᮒᮛᮤ; Javanese: ꦫꦠ꧀ꦤ ꦄꦤꦶ ꦭ꧀ꦭꦼꦱ꧀ꦠꦫꦶ; born 6 December 1965) is an Indonesian former politician who was the 26th regent of Banyuwangi regency of East Java from 2005 and 2010. She was the first female and first directly elected leader of the regency.

Between 2014–2015 following the end of her term and failure to run for reelection, she was arrested and convicted of corruption, with her prison sentence expiring in March 2018 and chose to become a lecturer afterwards.

Born in Banten, she grew up in East Java and went to university in Bali, where she married I Gede Winasa and began her political career. Following her victory in the 2005 election, her five-year tenure at Banyuwangi generated significant controversy, with multiple large-scale protests and the regency's municipal council making several attempts to remove her from office, and her being designated as a graft suspect during it. Eventually, she failed to run for reelection, and was convicted to five, later nine, years in prison.

== Background ==
Ratna was born on 6 December 1965 in Banten, then part of West Java, although she largely grew up in East Java. She attended elementary school in Kediri, middle school in Banyuwangi, and high school in Bondowoso, before moving to Denpasar to study economics at the University of National Education. She later graduated with a masters in management from Udayana University and with a doctorate in public administration from Brawijaya University.

== Family and personal life ==
Ratna's father was a contractor from Bondowoso, and her mother from Banyuwangi. She was the middle children of three.

She was married to I Gede Winasa, who was formerly a two-term regent of Jembrana – which was located across the Bali Strait from Banyuwangi – in 1988, although she divorced him in 2013. The couple had a single daughter. Dutch researcher Henk Schulte Nordholt remarked that they were "the first married couple to run two adjacent districts". Both were also eventually convicted of corruption in separate cases.

Ratna has been described as an abangan Muslim, having never attended pesantren nor participated in Nahdlatul Ulama organizations in her youth despite living in regencies known for strong NU presence, in addition to marrying Gede Winasa who was a Balinese Hindu.

== Career ==
=== Early politics and election ===
In the 2004 legislative election, Ratna won a seat in Jembrana Regency's municipal council representing PDI-P.

A year later, in 2005, partly with support from her husband, she ran as the regent of Banyuwangi in the regency's first direct election. Initially attempting to run with PDI-P, she failed to secure support in the party's January 2005 convention despite support from grassroots members, but ran anyway with the support of 18 political parties (including the Prosperous Justice Party and the National Mandate Party, although the former later withdrew) unrepresented in the municipal council. Running with M Yusuf Nuris (also known as Gus Yus), who was well-connected to local kyai, she secured the support of some PDI-P cadres and supporters of incumbent Samsul Hadi (who failed to run in the election). Her appeal during campaigning was described as "feminine" and "clean", and she conducted grassroots campaigning by meeting street vendors and visiting traditional markets. In addition, Ratna also promoted free education and healthcare programs, as her husband applied in Jembrana.

Eventually, she managed to win 311,653 votes (39.32%) in the five-candidate race, winning in 21 of the 24 subdistricts.

Throughout her campaigning period, Ratna had faced resistance from Muslim ulema leaders, as she had been accused of changing her religion from Hinduism to Islam in order to win the election. She was also accused of blasphemy against Islam by omitting a verse from Sūrah Yā-Sīn she distributed during the campaigning. Her appointment saw significant protests from the aforementioned groups, with the municipal council initially refusing to swear Ratna into office.

She was eventually sworn into office by East Java governor Imam Utomo on 20 October 2005, making her both the first directly elected and first female regent for Banyuwangi. Unlike typical regents, however, she was not sworn in at the municipal council building.

=== As regent ===
During her tenure, she faced constant protests and opposition from the municipal council which repeatedly tried to remove her from office or disrupt her. For instance, in May 2006 around 12,000 rallied against her free education program (which made education in public schools free but not madrasa) and occupied the municipal government office, and the municipal council released an ultimatum demanding her resignation. She was not in the office during the demonstrations, but returned to work several days later.

Within the five years she was in office, local government revenues more than doubled from Rp 39.5 billion to Rp 87.1 billion. She also approved the extension of a gold mine's permit despite protests from student and environmental groups. In 2007, Ratna decided to oppose a municipal bill which would ban prostitution in the regency, citing that the prostitutes generated major economic activity. She attempted to commercialize the Blimbingsari Airport, but only managed to attract a flight school and not commercial airlines.

Ratna also removed the municipal secretary, resulting in a lawsuit. She also fired several state-employed teachers, resulting in a mass protest by other teachers against her.

She registered to run for reelection in 2010, picking Pebdy Arisdiawan, head of Golkar's Banyuwangi branch, as running mate. However, the provincial branch of the party supported Abdullah Azwar Anas instead, and removed Pebdy from his post, resulting in the party's support for her being invalid and cancelling her bid for the election. Ratna then sent a letter to governor Soekarwo, requesting a delay in the election proceedings, but her request was rejected.

Her tenure ended on 20 October 2010, with her stating that she wished to work as a lecturer afterwards.

=== Arrest and prison ===
In 2008, Ratna and the previous regent Samsul Hadi was designated as suspects of graft during the construction of Blimbingsari Airport, particularly during its land relinquishment between 2005 and 2007.

Ratna was found guilty by the Surabaya District Court on 11 February 2013, which initially sentenced her to 5 years in prison before the sentence was changed to 6 years in May 2013. She appealed to the Supreme Court of Indonesia, but her sentence was instead lifted to 9 years in a decision made on 30 December 2014. She was found to have caused the state a loss of Rp 19.7 billion. Her sentence – which was reduced by clemency – ended in March 2018.

She has declared her intention to run for a second term as Banyuwangi regent in the 2024 Banyuwangi regency election, and registered at several political parties.

Political offices
Preceded by: Samsul Hadi	Regent of Banyuwangi; 2005–2010	Succeeded by: Abdullah Azwar Anas
