= Rini Widyantini =

Indonesian politician (born 1965)

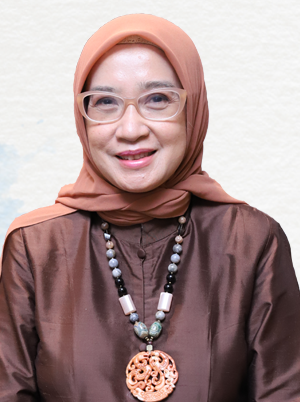

Minister of State Apparatus Utilization and Bureaucratic Reform
- Incumbent
- Assumed office 21 October 2024
- President: Prabowo Subianto
- Preceded by: Abdullah Azwar Anas

Personal details
- Born: 29 May 1965 (age 61) Bandung, West Java, Indonesia
- Party: Independent
- Spouse: Lisdiyanto Suhardjo
- Education: Padjadjaran University (LLB); Flinders University (MPM)

Rini Widyantini (born 29 May 1965) is an Indonesian politician serving as Minister of State Apparatus Utilization and Bureaucratic Reform since 2024. Being the first woman to hold the office, Rini served in a multitude of positions in the ministry before being appointed as minister, such as the deputy for institutional and governance affairs from 2012 to 2022 and the ministry's secretary from 2022 to 2024.

== Early life and education ==
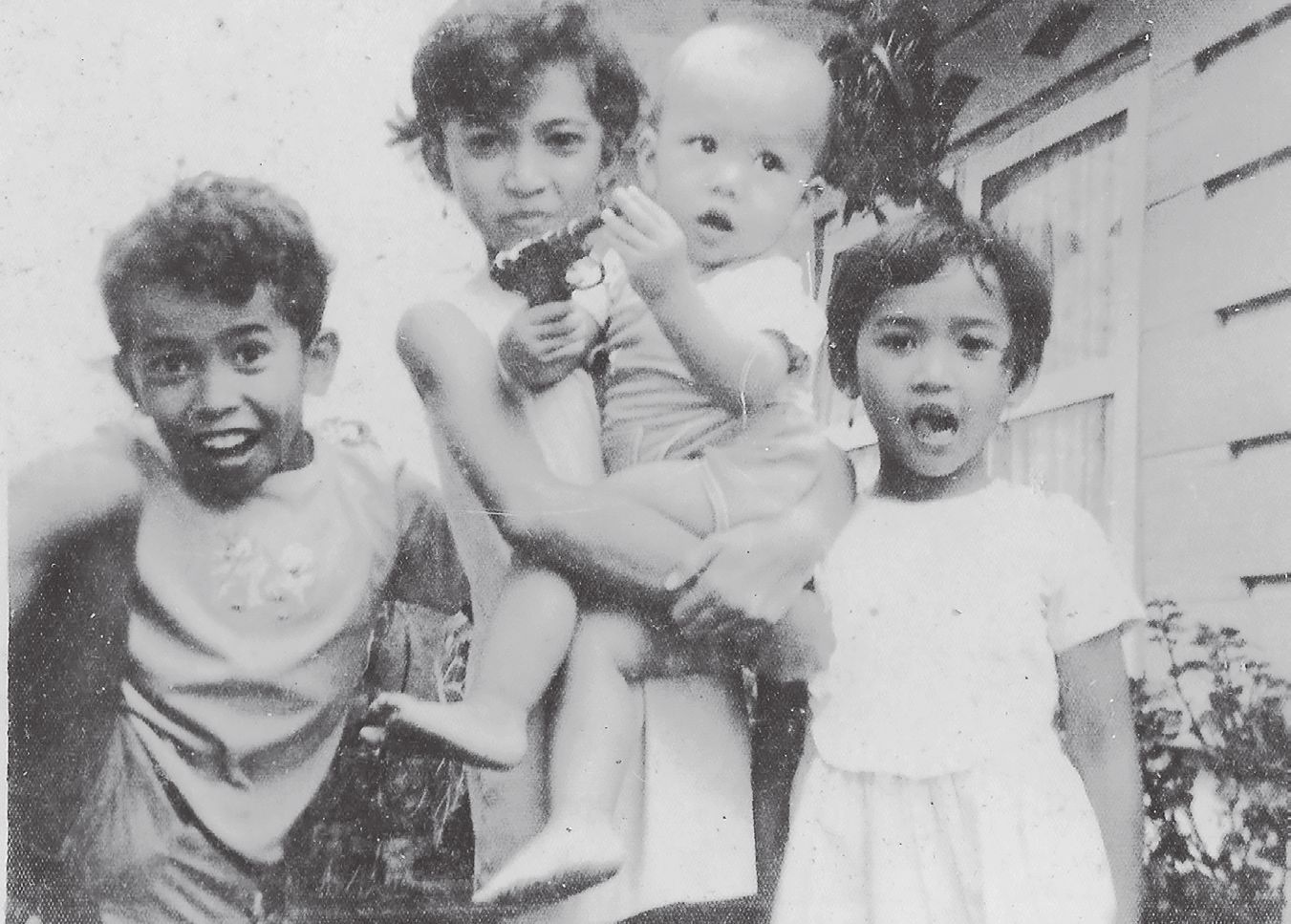
Rini Widyantini (right), c. 1970

Rini was born on 29 May 1965 in Bandung as the youngest daughter of Nadisah, a lecturer at the Bandung Sports College (now the Faculty of Sports of the Indonesian Education University). In the early 1970s, the family provided accommodation to students and friends living in the city, including minister of state apparatus Sarwono Kusumaatmadja and his wife, Nini, who were then university students. During her childhood, Rini took care of the couple’s first child.

Rini completed her primary education at the 4th Tikukur Elementary School in 1976. She then continued her education to the Saint Angela Middle School and High School in Bandung, graduating in 1980 and 1983, respectively. Upon finishing high school, she wanted to continue her studies outside Bandung. Despite this, her parents preferred that she remain in the city. She then studied law at the Padjadjaran University, graduating much faster than most of her peers in 1988. She later earned a master's degree in public policy and management from Flinders University in 1999 with a scholarship from the Australian government.

== Career ==
Upon receiving her law degree, Rini met representatives from the state secretariat who were recruiting fresh graduates. Rini was admitted a civil servant candidate on 1 March 1990 after passing a series of selection tests and was admitted as a civil servant on 1 October 1991. While working in the state secretariat, in 1993 Rini was selected for the Indonesian Japan Youth Exchange.

After several years of working in the state secretariat, she was transferred to the office of the minister of state for state apparatus utilization as a policy analyst on 2 July 1997, reporting to the deputy for policy implementation. Upon receiving her master's degree, she was promoted to head the non-departmental institutional policy subsection on 2 December 2000. Following reorganizations within the minister's office, Rini's post was elevated to a section on 14 May 2001.

Less than a year later, on 25 January 2002, Rini was named as the chief of the non-departmental institutional design section. She retained this office for more than half a decade before receiving a promotion on 6 May 2008 as the assistant to the deputy for institutional affairs for economic institutions during the tenure of minister Taufiq Effendi. After Taufiq was replaced by Evert Ernest Mangindaan in 2009, the assistant deputy's office for economic institutions were split into two different offices. Rini was named as the assistant to the deputy for institutional affairs for the first economic institutions.

On 14 April 2010, President Susilo Bambang Yudhoyono issued a decree which reorganized government ministries, notwithstanding the minister's office. Subordinate agencies under the minister's office were affected as a result of the reorganization, and new officials were installed to fill in the new organization on 11 June 2010. In the mass rotation process, Rini was named as the assistant to the deputy for institutional affairs for institutional policy formulation.

In January 2012, Rini was installed as the ministry's expert staff for legal affairs after successfully passing assessments and selections. During her tenure, Rini represented the ministry in a judicial review session on the position of deputy minister at the constitutional court. In October 2012, Rini was named as the acting deputy for institutional affairs, replacing the retiring Ismadi Ananda. She was installed for the position in a permanent capacity on 24 June 2013. Shortly upon her appointment, the deputy for governance affairs was merged into Rini's office, and she became the deputy for institutional and governance affairs in the ministry. On 29 May 2015, in the ministry's coffee morning and talkshow event, Rini was designated by minister Yuddy Chrisnandi as the ministry's spokesperson, alongside chief of legal affairs and information openness bureau Herman Suyatman.

After serving as deputy for about a decade, on 3 January 2022 Rini was installed as the secretary of the ministry, the most senior bureaucratic position in the ministry. Upon her inauguration, Rini announced her plans on reforming governance in the ministry and accelerate data integration in order to inform the public on the government's efforts in bureaucratic reform. Her inauguration was attended by 78-year old Sarwono Kusumaatmadja. Rini retained her deputy office in an acting capacity until a permanent replacement was installed on 6 April 2022.

On 21 October 2024, Rini was installed as the Minister of State Apparatus Utilization and Bureaucratic Reform.
