= Joko Widodo 2014 presidential campaign =

2014 presidential campaign of Jokowi

Joko Widodo for President
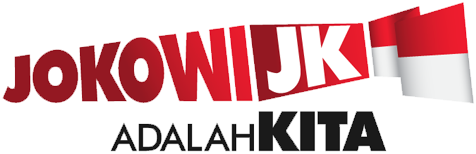
- Campaign: 2014 Indonesian presidential election
- Candidate: Joko Widodo; Governor of Jakarta (2012–2014); Mayor of Surakarta (2005–2012); Jusuf Kalla; Vice President of Indonesia (2004–2009)
- Affiliation: Great Indonesia Coalition
- Status: Announced: 14 March 2014; Registered: 19 May 2014; Authorized: 31 May 2014; Won election: 22 July 2014; Inaugurated: 20 October 2014
- Headquarters: Jl. Sisingamangaraja No. 5 Jakarta
- Key people: Chief executive: Tjahjo Kumolo; Secretary: Andi Widjajanto Advisers: Megawati Soekarnoputri; Muhaimin Iskandar; Wiranto; Surya Paloh; Spokespersons: Abdul Kadir Karding; Anies Baswedan; Ferry Mursyidan Baldan; Hasto Kristiyanto; Sarifuddin Sudding
- Receipts: Rp 312,376,119,823
- Slogan(s): Jokowi-JK Adalah Kita (We Are Jokowi-JK)

Joko Widodo's presidential campaign in 2014 was announced on 14 March 2014, when his political party PDI-P declared him as the party's candidate for the upcoming election in 2014. He was then the Governor of Jakarta, and previously the Mayor of Surakarta. With former vice president Jusuf Kalla as his running mate, he was elected as President of Indonesia following election on 9 July and official KPU announcement on 22 July.

Being supported by four political parties, Widodo officially launched his campaign in May, followed by two months of social media and in-person outreach. After a series of debates and challenges, the vote on July 9 resulted in his victory, with him securing over 53% of the ballots. Following a failed lawsuit from his opponent, Prabowo Subianto, and Hatta Rajasa, he was officially inaugurated on October 20, 2014, becoming the seventh President of Indonesia.

== Background ==
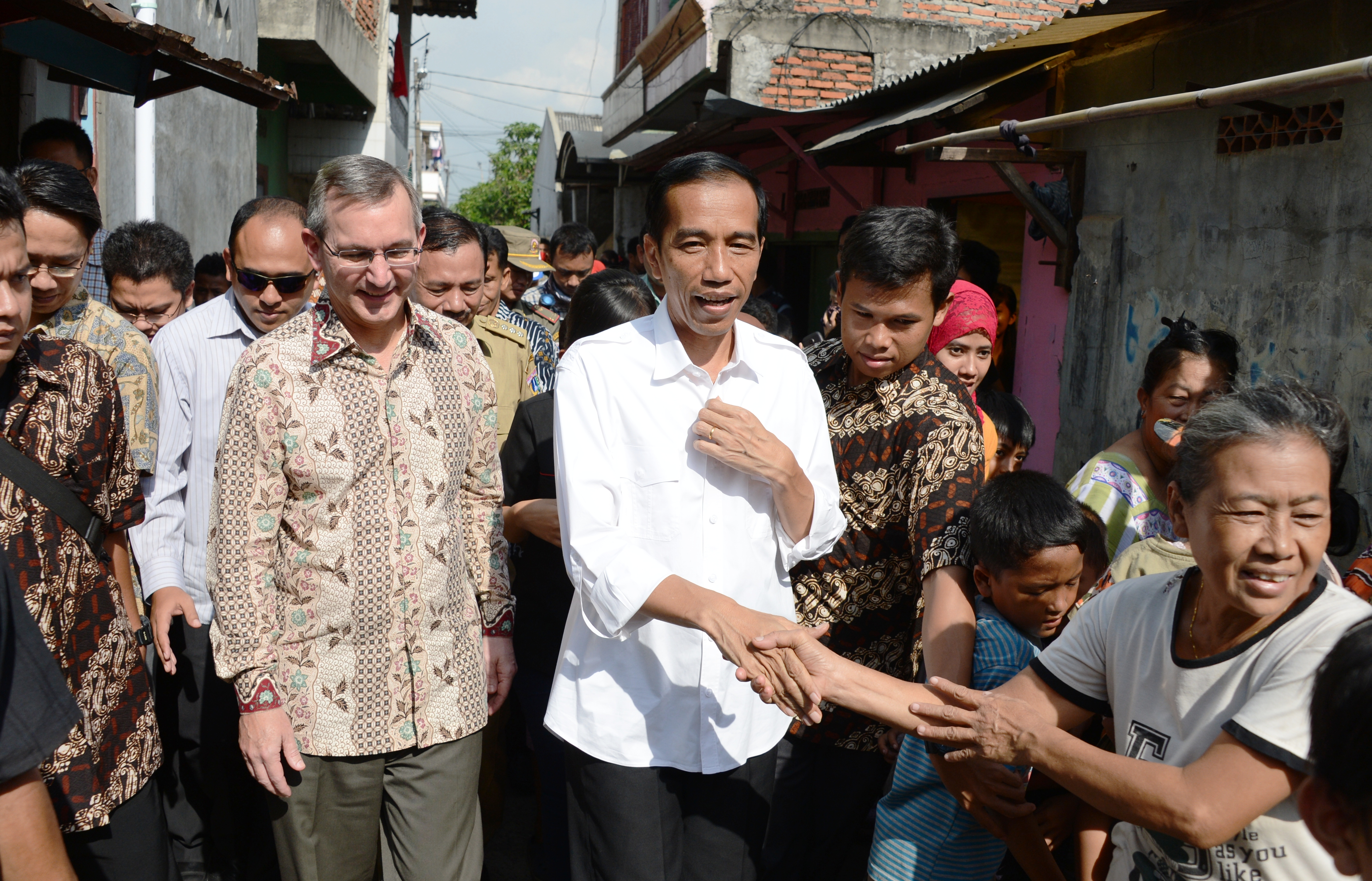
Jokowi doing blusukan in 2013, with US ambassador Scot Marciel

In 2012, Joko Widodo (popularly known as Jokowi) was elected as the Governor of Jakarta after defeating incumbent Fauzi Bowo in the 2012 Jakarta gubernatorial election. Having only entered politics in 2005 as the mayor of his hometown Surakarta, many national and international media outlets described him as a "rising star", with Bloomberg describing him as "Indonesia's most-promising politician". During the aforementioned gubernatorial election, his campaigning portrayed him as a reformer in contrast to other candidates and adopted a non-formal approach appealing directly to the voters. He was also described as a "media darling" due to his close relations with journalists and a social media pioneer, with his campaign team uploading all campaign materials to YouTube.

With incumbent president Susilo Bambang Yudhoyono hitting term limits in 2014, Jokowi was seen as a major contender for the position due to his popularity and he topped initial polls. Initially, Jokowi himself did not directly respond to media inquiries regarding his possible candidacy. During his governorship, his blusukan (impromptu visits) habit which he started doing during his mayoral term, became a center of attention outside his programs.

== Timeline ==
=== Declaration ===
On 14 March 2014, leader of PDI-P Megawati Soekarnoputri announced that her party would be endorsing Jokowi's candidacy in the 2014 presidential elections on July that year. The day before that, Jokowi accompanied Megawati in visiting the grave of the latter's father and first president of Indonesia Sukarno. Following the announcement, he did not immediately resign as governor, with the Ministry of Home Affairs noting that he was not required to. His official candidacy still required a support from the parliament to be elected in the legislative elections later that year. In order to put forth a candidate, a party of a coalition thereof required 20 percent of DPR seats (112) or 25 percent of the popular vote in accordance to Law 15 of 2014.

Following this declaration, both the IDX Composite and the Rupiah appreciated in value, which was attributed to positive investor sentiments to the news. His candidacy received criticism particularly from the side of Prabowo Subianto, who also was running for presidency and had previously supported Jokowi in the 2012 gubernatorial election. Others noted his 2012 campaign promise that he would serve as governor for a full five-year term.

=== Registration ===
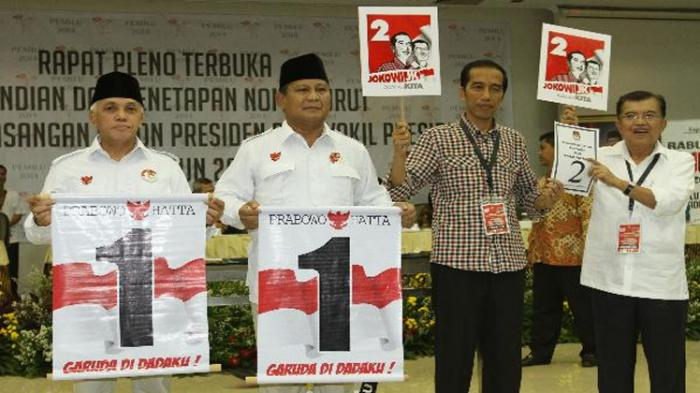
The candidates after being assigned their ballot numbers. Left to right: Hatta Rajasa, Prabowo Subianto, Joko Widodo and Jusuf Kalla

After the legislative election was held on 9 April 2014, with the results being announced on 10 May, Jokowi's political party PDI-P gained the most votes with 18.95% of the popular vote. It secured 109 seats in the People's Representative Council, 3 short from what's needed to run its own ticket and hence must form a coalition to do so. Following the announcement, Jokowi requested a leave from his position as governor on 12 May. Once approved, his deputy Basuki Tjahaja Purnama took over his position and became acting governor for the capital.

His running mate was not revealed until 19 May, when Jokowi declared that would be running with former vice president and 2009 presidential candidate Jusuf Kalla (JK). Supporting them initially was a coalition of four political parties: Indonesian Democratic Party of Struggle (PDI-P), NasDem Party, People's Conscience Party (Hanura) and the National Awakening Party (PKB). Golkar, which initially had stated that it would support the pair, switched to support the opposing Prabowo Subianto–Hatta Rajasa ticket shortly beforehand despite Kalla being a former chairman of Golkar. The pair registered to the General Elections Commission (Indonesian: Komisi Pemilihan Umum/KPU) on 19 May, accompanied by politicians such as Puan Maharani and Tjahjo Kumolo.

On 23 May, the Jokowi-JK national campaigning team (Indonesian: tim pemenangan/tim sukses/timses) was established. Included in the team are the chairman of the coalition's political parties as advisors: Megawati Soekarnoputri, Muhaimin Iskandar, Surya Paloh and Wiranto. The team was headed by PDI-P secretary general and People's Representative Council member Tjahjo Kumolo, and included lawmakers from the coalition parties, retired generals such as Luhut Binsar Pandjaitan and A. M. Hendropriyono, and religious figures such as former Nahdlatul Ulama chairman Hasyim Muzadi. Academician Anies Baswedan and former Blitar mayor Djarot Saiful Hidayat, who would both later serve as Governor of Jakarta, were also in the team. The team's office was in Jalan Sisingamangaraja, in Kebayoran Baru subdistrict of Jakarta.

Ballot numbers were assigned on 1 June, with rival ticket Prabowo-Hatta getting 1 and Jokowi-JK getting 2. The campaigning period officially commenced on 4 June, to last for a month and ended on 5 July. Both pairs submitted their campaigning itinerary to KPU by 7 June.

=== Campaigning ===
Widodo began his campaigning tour in Papua on early June 2014. His tour covered a multitude of provinces, in total visiting 31 provinces (all except for Jambi and Yogyakarta Special Region). In the last day of the campaigning period, he returned to Papua, visiting Jayapura and Sorong.

The serial number 2 assigned to him resulted in rock band Slank creating a song for his campaign, which was called "Salam Dua Jari" (two-finger salute). Later in the campaign, a concert of the same name was held in the Gelora Bung Karno Stadium, which Widodo attended. Other concerts of the same name and smaller scale were also held before in various cities in West Java.

During the campaign, a slanderous campaign against him was launched, accusing him of being secretly Christian and Chinese before further accusing him of having sympathies towards communism, namely the banned Indonesian Communist Party. The team denied all the allegations. Close to the voting date, Jokowi travelled to Mecca in a pilgrimage.

==== Social media ====
Elected lawmaker and vice chairman of Gerindra Fadli Zon claimed that his candidate and party received a flood of attacks on social media, and posted a poem on Twitter calling the attackers "Pasukan Nasi Bungkus" (panasbung, lit. "packaged rice army"). The term became commonly used in social media as a derogatory for supporters of either side or the large number of fake accounts.

The volunteers and staffs in the campaign's social media team were divided into "supportive" (posting positive news regarding Widodo-Kalla), "defensive" (defending the Widodo-Kalla pair) and "offensive" (attacking the Prabowo-Hatta pair). Compared to the Prabowo-Hatta campaign team, the volunteers and staffs were described as "more sporadic".

=== Debates ===
Five televised debates were held by the KPU. The debates were the first in Indonesia's electoral history to be broadcast live on television and the first one, held on 9 June, covered topics such as democracy, legal certainty and government transparency, in addition to human rights. In the second debate (15 June), which focused on economic development and social welfare, Widodo endorsed the nation's creative economy and went for an empowerment of "small economies". The third debate on 22 June focused on national security and international relations. During the debate, he was questioned regarding the varying Australia-Indonesia relations, in which he replied that "the two countries have a distrust problem, which needs to be solved through democracy". He also supported improving the welfare of soldiers in addition to modernizing the armed forces and defense industry.

The fourth debate on 29 June centered around human development in addition to science and technology, with the debates being held between the running mates, the presidential candidates watching from the audience. Kalla during the debate stated that free public education was "a given" and should no longer be up for debate. The fifth and final round of debates, which covered agriculture, energy and the environment, was held on 5 July. Jokowi-JK promised the opening of 1,000,000 hectares (2,500,000 acres) of new farmland (compared to 2 million promised by Prabowo-Hatta), a one map policy, establishment of value-adding industries for agricultural products and integrated cattle farms.

=== Voting ===
For the voting process, the Widodo campaign team deployed about witnesses to the individual polling stations across the country. In South Sulawesi alone, both sides deployed around 24,000 witnesses and each witness was provided Rp 200,000 (USD 15) as compensation.

Widodo himself voted in a Menteng poll station, while Kalla voted in Kebayoran Baru.

== Results ==
Following the voting, immediate quick count results generally favored Widodo's victory. However, Prabowo claimed victory based on some pollsters. Several hours before the official announcement by the KPU on 22 July 2014, Prabowo withdrew from the election, claiming "massive systemic fraud" and declaring that he would challenge the results in court. Regardless, the KPU announced Widodo's victory, with him having won 53.15% of the votes. Widodo won 70,997,833 votes; gaining victory in 23 out of 33 provinces in addition winning amongst the overseas voters.

== Post-election ==
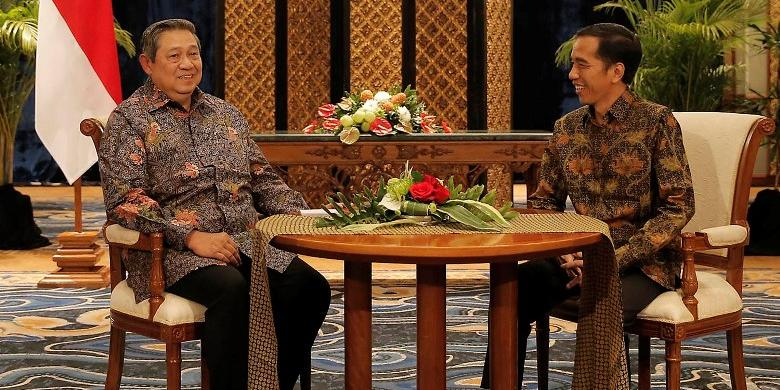
Widodo meeting his predecessor Susilo Bambang Yudhoyono in August, discussing transition of power

Following the announcement, Widodo received congratulations from heads of state across the world, including Singapore, Malaysia, Australia, New Zealand, United States, Japan and the United Kingdom among others. According to Widodo, Barack Obama called him in Indonesian, giving his congratulations and saying that he looked forward to meeting him in the APEC conference in China. He was sworn in on 20 October 2014, followed by a ceremonial parade from the Hotel Indonesia roundabout to Istana Merdeka.

=== Lawsuit ===
Prabowo-Hatta campaign's legal team sued the election results in the Constitutional Court. After about a month of proceedings, all judges unanimously rejected the appeal, noting that the requests were "not reasonable". Throughout the proceedings, thousands of his supporters protested near the court with around 50,000 police and military personnel being deployed to secure the perimeter.

== Finances ==
The campaign reported total earnings of Rp 312,376,119,823 (USD 27.2 million) and expenditures of Rp 311,899,377,825 (USD 27.15 million). Largest expenditures originated from advertising, which costed the team Rp 151,280,157,963 (USD 13.2 million) in total. Initial audit reports of campaign finances from both sides were checked by the Indonesia Corruption Watch, which noted that the discrepancy between earnings and expenditures of the Widodo team was irregular. However, they also noted that the nominal value was more realistic compared to Subianto's. Later, this was clarified by the campaigning team as meeting expenditures and the spending value was revised from around Rp 294 billion to the Rp 312 billion figure.

== Endorsements ==
Politicians are noted with their party origin or political affiliation should they come from parties not part of the candidate's coalition.

=== Politicians ===
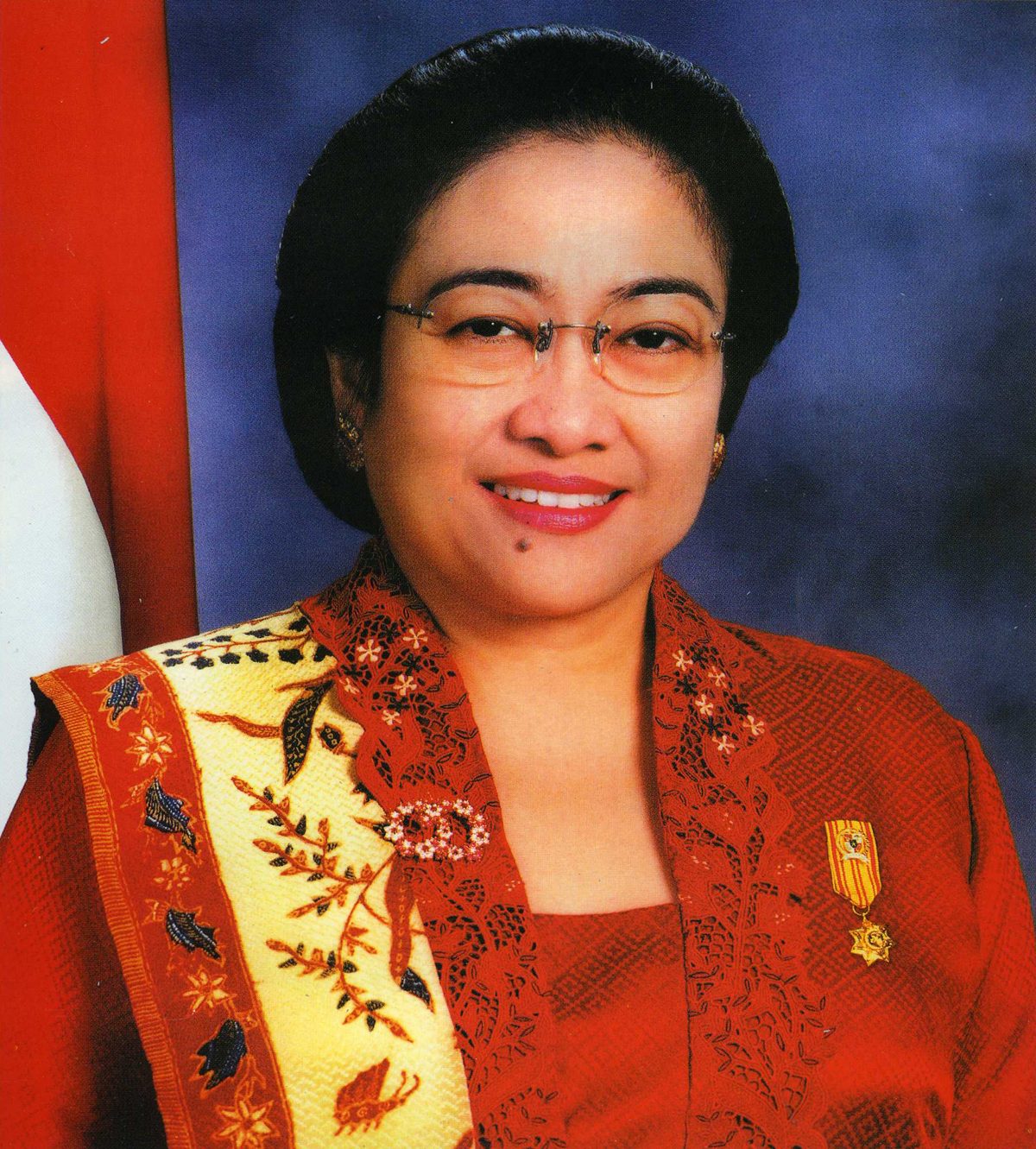
Megawati Sukarnoputri

==== Central government ====
- Megawati Sukarnoputri, 5th President of Indonesia (2001–04), 8th Vice President of Indonesia (1999–2001), daughter of 1st President Sukarno
- Muhaimin Iskandar, Minister of Manpower and Transmigration (2009–14)
- Pramono Anung, Deputy Speaker of DPR (2009–14)
- Gen. (Hon.) (ret.) Luhut Binsar Pandjaitan, former Minister of Industry and Trade (2000–01)
- Wiranto, former Coordinating Minister for Political and Security Affairs (1999–2000), former Commander of the Indonesian National Armed Forces (1998–99)
- Khofifah Indar Parawansa, former State Minister of Female Empowerment (1999–2001) (Independent)
- Oesman Sapta Odang, former Deputy Speaker of the MPR (2002–2004)
- Gen. (Hon.) (ret.) A. M. Hendropriyono, former head of the State Intelligence Agency (2001–04), Minister of Transmigration and Forest Squatter Settlements (1998–99)
- Ferry Mursyidan Baldan, former MPR member (1992–2009)

=== Retired military or police personnel ===
- Pol. Gen. Da'i Bachtiar, former Chief of the Indonesian National Police (2001–05)
- Adm. Tedjo Edhy Purdijatno, former Chief of Staff of the Indonesian Navy (2008–09)

=== Businesspeople ===
- Surya Paloh, owner of Media Group, general chair of NasDem Party

=== Entertainers ===
- Edo Kondologit, singer
- Ernest Prakasa, comedian
- Giring Ganesha, singer
- Glenn Fredly, singer
- Krisdayanti, singer
- Slank, rock band
- Titiek Puspa, singer
- Tompi, singer
