= 2024 Banyuwangi regency election =

- 27 November 2024
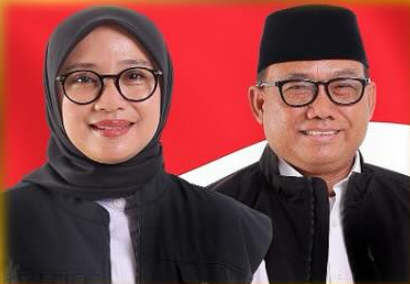

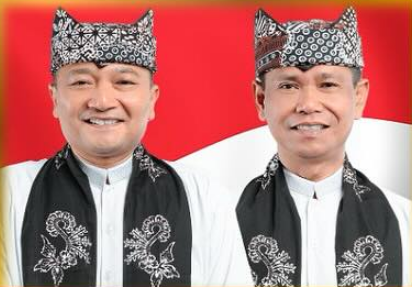
Candidate	Ipuk Fiestiandani	Ali Makki Zaini
Party	Indonesian Democratic Party of Struggle	PKB
Running mate	Mujiono	Ali Ruchi
Popular vote	404.366	371.688
Percentage	52,11%	47,89%
Regent before election
Ipuk Fiestiandani
PDI-P
Elected Regent
Ipuk Fiestiandani
PDI-P

The 2024 Banyuwangi regency election was held on 27 November 2024 as part of nationwide local elections to elect the regent of Banyuwangi Regency, East Java for a five-year term. The previous election was held in 2020. Incumbent regent Ipuk Fiestiandani managed to secure her second term.

== Electoral system ==
The election, like other local elections in 2024, follow the first-past-the-post system where the candidate with the most votes wins the election, even if they do not win a majority. It is possible for a candidate to run uncontested, in which case the candidate is still required to win a majority of votes "against" an "empty box" option. Should the candidate fail to do so, the election will be repeated on a later date. 651 election committee staffers will monitor the election, with 3 staff members per village.

== Candidates ==
According to electoral regulations, in order to qualify for the election, candidates are required to secure support from a political party or a coalition of parties controlling 10 seats (20 percent of all seats) in the Banyuwangi Regional House of Representatives (DPRD). The Indonesian Democratic Party of Struggle, with 11 seats from the 2024 legislative election, is the only party eligible to nominate a candidate without forming a coalition with other parties. Candidates may alternatively demonstrate support to run as an independent in form of photocopies of identity cards, which in Banyuwangi's case corresponds to 87,210 copies. No independent candidates registered prior to the deadline set by the General Elections Commission (KPU) on 12 May 2024.

=== Potential ===
The following are individuals who have either been publicly mentioned as a potential candidate by a political party in the DPRD, publicly declared their candidacy with press coverage, or considered as a potential candidate by media outlets:

- Ipuk Fiestiandani (Indonesian Democratic Party of Struggle), incumbent regent.
- Sugirah (PDI-P), incumbent vice regent.
- Ali Makki Zaini (PKB), chairman of Nahdlatul Ulama's Banyuwangi branch.

== Political map ==
Following the 2024 Indonesian general election, seven political parties are represented in the Banyuwangi DPRD:

Political parties	Seat count
Indonesian Democratic Party of Struggle (PDI-P)	11 / 50
National Awakening Party (PKB)	9 / 50
Party of Functional Groups (Golkar)	7 / 50
NasDem Party	7 / 50
Democratic Party (Demokrat)	7 / 50
Gerindra Party (Gerindra)	6 / 50
United Development Party (PPP)	3 / 50
